= 1970–71 Liverpool F.C. season =

English football club season

Liverpool F.C.
1970–71 season
- Chairman: H.E. Roberts
- Manager: Bill Shankly
- First Division: 5th
- Inter-Cities Fairs Cup: Semi-finals
- FA Cup: Runners-up
- League Cup: Third round
- Top goalscorer: League: Alun Evans (10); All: Alun Evans (15)
- Average home league attendance: 45,136
Home colours	Away colours

The 1970–71 season was Liverpool Football Club's 79th season in existence and their ninth consecutive season in the First Division. They finished fifth in the league, lost in the FA Cup final to the League and Cup double winners Arsenal, and lost on aggregate 1–0 in the semi-finals of the Fairs Cup to the eventual winners, Leeds United

Ray Clemence, Larry Lloyd, and Alec Lindsay emerged as key players in their second season of first-team action, and Steve Heighway, who joined from Skelmersdale United in May 1970, became a regular in his first full season with the club. John Toshack was bought from Cardiff City in November 1970 for £110,000, and became an instant hero by scoring in the Merseyside derby against Everton a few weeks later. Kevin Keegan was signed from Scunthorpe United for £35,000 a few days before the FA Cup final.

== Squad ==
=== Goalkeepers ===
- (England) Ray Clemence
- (Scotland) Tommy Lawrence

=== Defenders ===
- (England) Chris Fagan
- (Scotland) Ron Yeats
- (England) Roy Evans
- (England) Chris Lawler
- (England) Alec Lindsay
- (England) Larry Lloyd
- (Scotland) Ian Ross
- (England) John McLaughlin
- (England) Tommy Smith

=== Midfielders ===
- (England) Steve Arnold
- (England) Ian Callaghan
- (Scotland) Brian Hall
- (Republic of Ireland) Steve Heighway
- (England) Emlyn Hughes
- (England) Doug Livermore
- (Scotland) Ian St. John
- (England) Peter Thompson

=== Attackers ===
- (England) Phil Boersma
- (England) Alun Evans
- (Scotland) Bobby Graham
- (Wales) John Toshack
- (England) Jack Whitham

== Squad statistics ==
=== Appearances and goals ===
No.	Pos	Nat	Player	Total		Division 1		FA Cup		League Cup		Fairs Cup	
No.	Pos	Nat	Player	Apps	Goals	Apps	Goals	Apps	Goals	Apps	Goals	Apps	Goals
	MF	(England) ENG	Steve Arnold	1	0	1+0	0	0+0	0	0+0	0	0+0	0
	FW	(England) ENG	Phil Boersma	21	3	13+2	1	3+0	0	0+0	0	2+1	2
	MF	(England) ENG	Ian Callaghan	34	0	21+2	0	4+1	0	1+0	0	5+0	0
	GK	(England) ENG	Ray Clemence	61	0	41+0	0	7+0	0	3+0	0	10+0	0
	FW	(England) ENG	Alun Evans	34	15	21+0	10	3+1	1	3+0	1	6+0	3
	DF	(England) ENG	Roy Evans	6	0	4+0	0	0+0	0	1+0	0	1+0	0
	DF	(England) ENG	Kit Fagan	1	0	1+0	0	0+0	0	0+0	0	0+0	0
	FW	(Scotland) SCO	Bobby Graham	19	6	13+1	5	0+0	0	2+0	0	2+1	1
	MF	(Scotland) SCO	Brian Hall	51	2	32+1	1	7+0	1	3+0	0	8+0	0
	MF	(Republic of Ireland) IRL	Steve Heighway	47	7	29+2	4	7+0	2	2+0	0	7+0	1
	DF	(England) ENG	Emlyn Hughes	59	5	39+0	2	7+0	0	3+0	1	10+0	2
	DF	(England) ENG	Chris Lawler	61	6	41+0	3	7+0	2	3+0	0	10+0	1
	GK	(Scotland) SCO	Tommy Lawrence	1	0	1+0	0	0+0	0	0+0	0	0+0	0
	DF	(England) ENG	Alec Lindsay	35	1	21+0	0	4+0	0	2+0	0	8+0	1
	MF	(England) ENG	Doug Livermore	2	0	0+1	0	0+0	0	1+0	0	0+0	0
	DF	(England) ENG	Larry Lloyd	60	0	40+0	0	7+0	0	3+0	0	10+0	0
	MF	(England) ENG	John McLaughlin	45	3	33+0	2	4+0	1	1+0	0	7+0	0
	DF	(Scotland) SCO	Ian Ross	14	1	8+4	0	0+0	0	0+0	0	1+1	1
	DF	(England) ENG	Tommy Smith	61	3	41+0	2	7+0	0	3+0	1	10+0	0
	FW	(Scotland) SCO	Ian St John	3	1	0+1	0	0+1	1	0+0	0	0+1	0
	MF	(England) ENG	Peter Thompson	38	2	24+3	2	1+1	0	1+0	0	6+2	0
	FW	(Wales) WAL	John Toshack	33	7	21+0	5	7+0	1	0+0	0	5+0	1
	FW	(England) ENG	Jack Whitham	7	1	6+0	1	0+0	0	1+0	0	0+0	0
	DF	(Scotland) SCO	Ron Yeats	16	1	11+1	1	2+0	0	0+0	0	2+0	0

== League table ==
Pos	Team	Pld	W	D	L	GF	GA	GAv	Pts	Qualification or relegation
3	Tottenham Hotspur	42	19	14	9	54	33	1.636	52	Qualification for the UEFA Cup first round
4	Wolverhampton Wanderers	42	22	8	12	64	54	1.185	52	Qualification for the UEFA Cup first round
5	Liverpool	42	17	17	8	42	24	1.750	51	Qualification for the European Cup Winners' Cup first round (Note: Liverpool qualified for the European Cup Winners' Cup as FA Cup runners-up, as winners, Arsenal, qualified for the European Cup.)
6	Chelsea	42	18	15	9	52	42	1.238	51	Qualification for the European Cup Winners' Cup first round (Note: Chelsea qualified for the European Cup Winners' Cup as the 1970-71 European Cup Winners' Cup winners.)
7	Southampton	42	17	12	13	56	44	1.273	46	Qualification for the UEFA Cup first round

Source: World Football
Rules for classification: 1) Points; 2) Goal average; 3) Goals scored

== Results ==
=== First Division ===
Date	Opponents	Venue	Result	Scorers	Attendance	Report 1	Report 2
15-Aug-70	Burnley	A	2–1	Evans 19' Hughes 77'	26,702	Report	Report
17-Aug-70	Blackpool	A	0–0		28,818	Report	Report
22-Aug-70	Huddersfield Town	H	4–0	McLaughlin 9', 39' Evans 74', 88'	52,628	Report	Report
25-Aug-70	Crystal Palace	H	1–1	Graham 28'	47,612	Report	Report
29-Aug-70	West Bromwich Albion	A	1–1	Evans 25'	31,624	Report	Report
05-Sep-70	Manchester United	H	1–1	Evans 22'	52,541	Report	Report
12-Sep-70	Newcastle United	A	0–0		35,501	Report	Report
19-Sep-70	Nottingham Forest	H	3–0	Graham 15' Thompson 27' Evans 69'	40,676	Report	Report
26-Sep-70	Southampton	A	0–1		26,155	Report	Report
03-Oct-70	Chelsea	H	1–0	Evans 22'	46,196	Report	Report
10-Oct-70	Tottenham Hotspur	A	0–1		44,457	Report	Report
17-Oct-70	Burnley	H	2–0	Yeats 44' Heighway 51'	40,804	Report	Report
24-Oct-70	Ipswich Town	A	0–1		22,577	Report	Report
31-Oct-70	Wolverhampton Wanderers	H	2–0	Smith 48 pen' Evans 72'	45,391	Report	Report
07-Nov-70	Derby County	A	0–0		33,004	Report	Report
14-Nov-70	Coventry City	H	0–0		40,303	Report	Report
21-Nov-70	Everton	H	3–2	Heighway 69' Toshack 76' Lawler 84'	53,777	Report	Report
28-Nov-70	Arsenal	A	0–2		45,097	Report	Report
05-Dec-70	Leeds United	H	1–1	Toshack 52'	51,357	Report	Report
12-Dec-70	West Ham United	A	2–1	Whitham 27' Boersma 43'	27,459	Report	Report
19-Dec-70	Huddersfield Town	A	0–0		25,033	Report	Report
26-Dec-70	Stoke City	H	0–0		47,103	Report	Report
09-Jan-71	Blackpool	H	2–2	Heighway 38' Craven (og) 82'	42,939	Report	Report
12-Jan-71	Manchester City	H	0–0		45,985	Report	Report
16-Jan-71	Crystal Palace	A	0–1		28,253	Report	Report
30-Jan-71	Arsenal	H	2–0	Toshack 4' Smith 50'	43,847	Report	Report
06-Feb-71	Leeds United	A	1–0	Toshack 2'	48,425	Report	Report
16-Feb-71	West Ham United	H	1–0	Toshack 58'	38,032	Report	Report
20-Feb-71	Everton	A	0–0		56,846	Report	Report
27-Feb-71	Wolverhampton Wanderers	A	0–1		32,290	Report	Report
13-Mar-71	Coventry City	A	0–1		27,687	Report	Report
20-Mar-71	Derby County	H	2–0	Mackay (og) 42' Lawler 88'	40,990	Report	Report
29-Mar-71	Ipswich Town	H	2–1	Evans 17' Graham 60'	42,017	Report	Report
02-Apr-71	West Bromwich Albion	H	1–1	Evans 83'	43,580	Report	Report
06-Apr-71	Newcastle United	H	1–1	Lawler 44'	44,289	Report	Report
10-Apr-71	Stoke City	A	1–0	Thompson 32'	28,810	Report	Report
12-Apr-71	Chelsea	A	0–1		38,705	Report	Report
17-Apr-71	Tottenham Hotspur	H	0–0		49,363	Report	Report
19-Apr-71	Manchester United	A	2–0	Heighway 19' Edwards (og) 58'	44,004	Report	Report
24-Apr-71	Nottingham Forest	A	1–0	Hall 68'	20,678	Report	Report
26-Apr-71	Manchester City	A	2–2	Graham 30', 34'	17,975	Report	Report
01-May-71	Southampton	H	1–0	Hughes 30'	38,427	Report	Report

=== Football League Cup ===
Date	Opponents	Venue	Result	Scorers	Attendance	Report 1	Report 2
08-Sep-70	Mansfield Town	A	0–0		31,612	Report	Report
22-Sep-70	Mansfield Town	H	3–2	Hughes 16' Smith 85 Pen' Evans 117'	29,964	Report	Report
06-Oct-70	Swindon Town	A	0–2		40,878	Report	Report

=== FA Cup ===
Date	Opponents	Venue	Result	Scorers	Attendance	Report 1	Report 2
02-Jan-71	Aldershot	H	1–0	McLaughlin 28'	45,500	Report	Report
23-Jan-71	Swansea City	H	3–0	Toshack 53' St. John 85' Lawler 87'	47,229	Report	Report
13-Feb-71	Southampton	H	1–0	Lawler 29'	50,226	Report	Report
06-Mar-71	Tottenham Hotspur	H	0–0		54,731	Report	Report
16-Mar-71	Tottenham Hotspur	A	1–0	Heighway 25'	56,283	Report	Report
27-Mar-71	Everton	N	2–1	A. Evans 59' Hall 73'	62,144	Report	Report

Final

8 May 1971
15:00 BST

Liverpool	1–2 (a.e.t.)	Arsenal
Heighway 92'	Report	Kelly 101'; George 111'

Wembley Stadium, London
Attendance: 100,000
Referee: Norman Burtenshaw (Great Yarmouth)

Liverpool	Arsenal

GK	1	(England) Ray Clemence
RB	2	(England) Chris Lawler
LB	3	(England) Alec Lindsay
CB	4	(England) Tommy Smith (c)
CB	5	(England) Larry Lloyd
CM	6	(England) Emlyn Hughes
RM	7	(England) Ian Callaghan
ST	8	(England) Alun Evans	(substituted off) 68'
LM	9	(Republic of Ireland) Steve Heighway
ST	10	(Wales) John Toshack
CM	11	(England) Brian Hall
Substitutes:
MF	12	(England) Peter Thompson	(substituted in) 68'
Manager:
(Scotland) Bill Shankly

GK	1	(Scotland) Bob Wilson
RB	2	(Northern Ireland) Pat Rice
LB	3	(England) Bob McNab
RM	4	(England) Peter Storey	(substituted off) 64'
CB	5	(Scotland) Frank McLintock (c)
CB	6	(England) Peter Simpson
LM	7	(England) George Armstrong
CM	8	(Scotland) George Graham
ST	9	(England) John Radford
ST	10	(England) Ray Kennedy
CM	11	(England) Charlie George
Substitutes:
MF	12	(Scotland) Eddie Kelly	(substituted in) 64'
Manager:
(England) Bertie Mee

=== Inter-Cities Fairs Cup ===
Date	Opponents	Venue	Result	Scorers	Attendance	Report 1	Report 2
15-Sep-70	Ferencvárosi TC	H	1–0	Graham 17'	37,531	Report	Report
29-Sep-70	Ferencvárosi TC	A	1–1	Hughes 65'	25,000	Report	Report
21-Oct-70	Dinamo București	H	3–0	Lindsay 60' Lawler 76' Hughes 82'	36,525	Report	Report
04-Nov-70	Dinamo București	A	1–1	Boersma 47'	50,000	Report	Report
09-Dec-70	Hibernian	A	1–0	Toshack 75'	30,296	Report	Report
22-Dec-70	Hibernian	H	2–0	Heighway 23' Boersma 50'	37,815	Report	Report
10-Mar-71	Bayern Munich	H	3–0	A. Evans 30', 49', 73'	45,616	Report	Report
24-Mar-71	Bayern Munich	A	1–1	Ross 75'	22,000	Report	Report
14-Apr-71	Leeds United	H	0–1		52,577	Report	Report
28-Apr-71	Leeds United	A	0–0		40,462	Report	Report
