= 1969–70 Liverpool F.C. season =

English football club season

Liverpool F.C.
1969–70 season
- Manager: Bill Shankly
- First Division: 5th
- Inter-Cities Fairs Cup: Second round
- FA Cup: Quarter-finals
- League Cup: Third round
- Top goalscorer: League: Bobby Graham (13); All: Bobby Graham (21)
Home colours	Away colours

The 1969–70 season was Liverpool Football Club's 78th season in existence and their eighth consecutive season in the First Division. This was a disappointing season, as the team finished fifth in the league after a promising start to the season while city rivals Everton won the championship title. It was to be a season of transition with so many of the players who were part of the 1960s side being replaced after being knocked out of the FA Cup by Second Division Watford. It was also a season in which they were knocked out in the early rounds of the League Cup and Fairs Cup.

One player who gave so much great service Roger Hunt, a 1966 World Cup winner left the club after 286 goals in all competitions in December 1969 to join Bolton Wanderers.

== Squad ==
=== Goalkeepers ===
- (England) Ray Clemence
- (Scotland) Tommy Lawrence
- (England) Grahame Lloyd

=== Defenders ===
- (England) Steve Arnold
- (England) Gerry Byrne
- (England) Chris Lawler
- (England) Larry Lloyd
- (England) John McLaughlin
- (Scotland) Ian Ross
- (England) Tommy Smith
- (England) Geoff Strong
- (England) Peter Wall
- (Scotland) Ron Yeats

=== Midfielders ===
- (England) Ian Callaghan
- (Scotland) Brian Hall
- (England) Emlyn Hughes
- (England) Alec Lindsay
- (England) Doug Livermore
- (Scotland) Ian St. John
- (England) Peter Thompson

=== Attackers ===
- (England) Phil Boersma
- (England) Alun Evans
- (England) Roy Evans
- (Scotland) Bobby Graham
- (England) Roger Hunt
- (England) Steve Peplow

== Squad statistics ==
=== Appearances and goals ===
No.	Pos	Nat	Player	Total		Division 1		FA Cup		League Cup		Fairs Cup	
No.	Pos	Nat	Player	Apps	Goals	Apps	Goals	Apps	Goals	Apps	Goals	Apps	Goals
	FW	(England) ENG	Phil Boersma	6	0	4+0	0	0+0	0	0+1	0	1+0	0
	MF	(England) ENG	Ian Callaghan	53	5	41+0	3	6+0	0	2+0	0	3+1	2
	GK	(England) ENG	Ray Clemence	17	0	14+0	0	1+0	0	0+0	0	2+0	0
	FW	(England) ENG	Alun Evans	25	9	17+2	3	1+1	2	1+0	1	2+1	3
	DF	(England) ENG	Roy Evans	3	0	3+0	0	0+0	0	0+0	0	0+0	0
	FW	(Scotland) SCO	Bobby Graham	54	21	42+0	13	6+0	4	2+0	1	4+0	3
	MF	(Scotland) SCO	Brian Hall	1	0	0+1	0	0+0	0	0+0	0	0+0	0
	DF	(England) ENG	Emlyn Hughes	53	7	41+0	7	6+0	0	2+0	0	4+0	0
	FW	(England) ENG	Roger Hunt	22	7	15+3	6	0+0	0	2+0	0	0+2	1
	DF	(England) ENG	Chris Lawler	54	11	42+0	10	6+0	0	2+0	0	4+0	1
	GK	(Scotland) SCO	Tommy Lawrence	37	0	28+0	0	5+0	0	2+0	0	2+0	0
	DF	(England) ENG	Alec Lindsay	7	2	4+2	1	0+0	0	0+0	0	1+0	1
	MF	(England) ENG	Doug Livermore	14	0	13+1	0	0+0	0	0+0	0	0+0	0
	DF	(England) ENG	Larry Lloyd	9	0	8+0	0	0+0	0	0+0	0	1+0	0
	MF	(England) ENG	John McLaughlin	1	0	1+0	0	0+0	0	0+0	0	0+0	0
	FW	(England) ENG	Steve Peplow	3	0	2+0	0	0+0	0	0+0	0	1+0	0
	DF	(Scotland) SCO	Ian Ross	13	2	7+0	1	4+1	1	0+0	0	1+0	0
	DF	(England) ENG	Tommy Smith	45	7	36+0	4	3+0	0	2+0	0	4+0	3
	FW	(Scotland) SCO	Ian St John	36	7	25+1	5	6+0	1	1+0	1	2+1	0
	FW	(England) ENG	Geoff Strong	46	3	34+0	3	6+0	0	2+0	0	4+0	0
	MF	(England) ENG	Peter Thompson	49	7	39+0	3	4+0	1	2+0	0	4+0	3
	DF	(England) ENG	Peter Wall	16	0	9+0	0	6+0	0	0+0	0	1+0	0
	DF	(Scotland) SCO	Ron Yeats	48	3	37+0	3	6+0	0	2+0	0	3+0	0

== League table ==
Pos	Team	Pld	W	D	L	GF	GA	GAv	Pts	Qualification or relegation
3	Chelsea	42	21	13	8	70	50	1.400	55	Qualification for the European Cup Winners' Cup first round (Note: Chelsea qualified for the European Cup Winners' Cup as the 1969-70 FA Cup winners.)
4	Derby County	42	22	9	11	64	37	1.730	53	Qualification for the Watney Cup (Note: Derby County and Manchester United qualified for the Watney Cup as the two teams with the most goals that hadn't already qualified for a European competition.)
5	Liverpool	42	20	11	11	65	42	1.548	51	Qualification for the Inter-Cities Fairs Cup first round
6	Coventry City	42	19	11	12	58	48	1.208	49	Qualification for the Inter-Cities Fairs Cup first round
7	Newcastle United	42	17	13	12	57	35	1.629	47	Qualification for the Inter-Cities Fairs Cup first round

Source: World Football
Rules for classification: 1) Points; 2) Goal average; 3) Goals scored

== Results ==
=== First Division ===
Date	Opponents	Venue	Result	Scorers	Attendance	Report 1	Report 2
09-Aug-69	Chelsea	H	4–1	Lawler 26' St. John 49', 83' Strong 60'	48,383	Report	Report
12-Aug-69	Manchester City	H	3–2	St. John 2', 88' Hunt 83'	51,959	Report	Report
16-Aug-69	Tottenham Hotspur	A	2–0	Hughes 2' Lawler 37'	50,474	Report	Report
20-Aug-69	Manchester City	A	2–0	Graham 44', 80'	47,888	Report	Report
23-Aug-69	Burnley	H	3–3	Smith 36' (pen.), 77' Graham 49'	51,113	Report	Report
27-Aug-69	Crystal Palace	A	3–1	Hughes 36' Hunt 73' Thompson 82'	36,369	Report	Report
30-Aug-69	Sheffield Wednesday	A	1–1	Lawler 42'	33,600	Report	Report
06-Sep-69	Coventry City	H	2–1	St. John 37' Strong 89'	48,337	Report	Report
09-Sep-69	Sunderland	H	2–0	Strong 12' Smith 34'	46,370	Report	Report
13-Sep-69	Manchester United	A	0–1		59,387	Report	Report
20-Sep-69	Stoke City	H	3–1	Hunt 15' Hughes 22' Callaghan 64'	45,745	Report	Report
27-Sep-69	West Bromwich Albion	A	2–2	Graham 25' Hunt 89'	34,343	Report	Report
04-Oct-69	Nottingham Forest	H	1–1	Own goal 50'	44,859	Report	Report
07-Oct-69	Tottenham Hotspur	H	0–0		46,518	Report	Report
11-Oct-69	Newcastle United	A	0–1		43,830	Report	Report
18-Oct-69	Ipswich Town	A	2–2	Graham 8' Lindsay 76'	23,263	Report	Report
25-Oct-69	Southampton	H	4–1	Hughes 10' Hunt 83', 84' Own goal 88'	41,611	Report	Report
01-Nov-69	Derby County	A	0–4		40,993	Report	Report
08-Nov-69	Wolverhampton Wanderers	H	0–0		39,114	Report	Report
15-Nov-69	West Ham United	H	2–0	Lawler 27' Graham 60'	39,668	Report	Report
22-Nov-69	Leeds United	A	1–1	Yeats 31'	43,293	Report	Report
29-Nov-69	Arsenal	H	0–1		40,295	Report	Report
06-Dec-69	Everton	A	3–0	Hughes 47' Own goal 54' Graham 74'	57,026	Report	Report
13-Dec-69	Manchester United	H	1–4	Hughes 25'	47,682	Report	Report
26-Dec-69	Burnley	A	5–1	Ross 26' Graham 39' Lawler 44' Thompson 52' Callaghan 60'	22,944	Report	Report
10-Jan-70	Stoke City	A	2–0	Graham 33' Thompson 70'	30,038	Report	Report
17-Jan-70	West Bromwich Albion	H	1–1	Lawler 70'	43,526	Report	Report
31-Jan-70	Nottingham Forest	A	0–1		30,838	Report	Report
16-Feb-70	Newcastle United	H	0–0		38,218	Report	Report
28-Feb-70	Derby County	H	0–2		43,594	Report	Report
03-Mar-70	Coventry City	A	3–2	Hughes 38' Evans 65', 72'	29,497	Report	Report
07-Mar-70	Leeds United	H	0–0		51,435	Report	Report
11-Mar-70	Southampton	A	1–0	Evans 43'	23,239	Report	Report
14-Mar-70	Arsenal	A	1–2	Yeats 83'	32,333	Report	Report
16-Mar-70	Sheffield Wednesday	H	3–0	Lawler 50' Yeats 63' Graham 68'	31,931	Report	Report
21-Mar-70	Everton	H	0–2		54,496	Report	Report
24-Mar-70	Ipswich Town	H	2–0	Callaghan 32' Smith 43' (pen.)	29,548	Report	Report
28-Mar-70	West Ham United	A	0–1		38,239	Report	Report
30-Mar-70	Wolverhampton Wanderers	A	1–0	Lawler 43'	32,754	Report	Report
03-Apr-70	Crystal Palace	H	3–0	Graham 16', 48' Lawler 47'	30,999	Report	Report
15-Apr-70	Sunderland	A	1–0	Lawler 86'	33,007	Report	Report
18-Apr-70	Chelsea	A	1–2	Graham 27'	36,521	Report	Report

=== Football League Cup ===
Date	Opponents	Venue	Result	Scorers	Attendance	Report 1	Report 2
03-Sep-69	Watford	H	2–1	Own goal 6' St. John 75'	21,149	Report	Report
24-Sep-69	Manchester City	A	2–3	Evans 21' Graham 67'	28,019	Report	Report

=== FA Cup ===
Date	Opponents	Venue	Result	Scorers	Attendance	Report 1	Report 2
07-Jan-70	Coventry City	A	1–1	Graham 30'	33,688	Report	Report
12-Jan-70	Coventry City	H	3–0	Ross 39' Thompson 54' Graham 72'	51,261	Report	Report
24-Jan-70	Wrexham	H	3–1	Graham 51', 73' St. John 59'	54,096	Report	Report
07-Feb-70	Leicester City	H	0–0		53,785	Report	Report
11-Feb-70	Leicester City	A	2–0	Evans 64', 90'	42,100	Report	Report
21-Feb-70	Watford	A	0–1		34,047	Report	Report

=== Inter-Cities Fairs Cup ===
Date	Opponents	Venue	Result	Scorers	Attendance	Report 1	Report 2
16-Sep-69	Dundalk	H	10–0	Evans 1', 38' Lawler 10' Smith 24', 67' Graham 36', 82' Lindsay 56' Thompson 69' Callaghan 76'	32,656	Report	Report
30-Sep-69	Dundalk	A	4–0	Thompson 13', 31' Graham 48' Callaghan 81'	6,000	Report	Report
12-Nov-69	Vitória de Setúbal	A	0–1		16,000	Report	Report
26-Nov-69	Vitória de Setúbal	H	3–2	Smith 60' (pen.) Evans 88' Hunt 90'	41,633	Report	Report
