= 1972–73 Liverpool F.C. season =

English football club season

Liverpool F.C.
1972–73 season
- Chairman: H.E. Roberts
- Manager: Bill Shankly
- First Division: Champion
- UEFA Cup: Champion
- FA Cup: 4th round
- League Cup: 5th round
- Top goalscorer: League: Kevin Keegan (13); John Toshack (13); All: Kevin Keegan (22)
- Average home league attendance: 48,103
Home colours	Away colours

The 1972–73 season was Liverpool Football Club's 81st season in existence and their 11th consecutive season in the First Division. After seven years without a trophy, Liverpool won both the Football League and the UEFA Cup in an extremely successful season, the highlight of Bill Shankly's managerial career. The rebuilding of the team from the one that served so well in the 1960s had been fully realised.

Having come close the previous season, Liverpool finally won the league title by three points from Arsenal. On 30 December 1972, they beat Crystal Palace at Anfield for their twenty-first consecutive home win in the league. This was the longest run in English top-flight history until it was surpassed by Jürgen Klopp’s Liverpool team in March 2020.

The UEFA Cup triumph marked the start of a period of success in Europe, as they overcame the previous season's winners Tottenham Hotspur in the semi-finals and Borussia Mönchengladbach 3–2 on aggregate in the final.

Peter Cormack was a key signing from Nottingham Forest during the summer of 1972. The emergence of Kevin Keegan and Ray Clemence led to both players making their England debuts in the World Cup qualifier against Wales on 15 November 1972, alongside Emlyn Hughes, who was already established in the England team.

== Squad ==
=== Goalkeepers ===
- (England) Ray Clemence
- (England) Frankie Lane
- (England) Grahame Lloyd

=== Defenders ===
- (England) Steve Arnold
- (England) Roy Evans
- (England) Chris Lawler
- (England) Alec Lindsay
- (England) Larry Lloyd
- (England) John McLaughlin
- (Scotland) Ian Ross
- (England) Tommy Smith
- (England) Trevor Storton
- (England) John Webb

=== Midfielders ===
- (England) Ian Callaghan
- (Scotland) Peter Cormack
- (Scotland) Brian Hall
- (Republic of Ireland) Steve Heighway
- (England) Emlyn Hughes
- (England) Hughie McAuley
- (England) Phil Thompson
- (England) Peter Thompson

=== Attackers ===
- (England) Phil Boersma
- (England) Derek Brownbill
- (England) Kevin Keegan
- (England) Kevin Kewley
- (Wales) John Toshack
- (England) Jack Whitham

== Squad statistics ==
=== Appearances and goals ===
No.	Pos	Nat	Player	Total		Division 1		FA Cup		League Cup		UEFA Cup	
No.	Pos	Nat	Player	Apps	Goals	Apps	Goals	Apps	Goals	Apps	Goals	Apps	Goals
	FW	(England) ENG	Phil Boersma	31	13	19+0	7	0+1	0	2+1	2	5+3	4
	MF	(England) ENG	Ian Callaghan	66	4	42+0	3	4+0	0	8+0	1	12+0	0
	GK	(England) ENG	Ray Clemence	64	0	41+0	0	4+0	0	7+0	0	12+0	0
	MF	(Scotland) SCO	Peter Cormack	52	10	30+0	8	4+0	1	8+0	0	10+0	1
	MF	(Scotland) SCO	Brian Hall	31	3	17+4	2	0+0	0	1+1	0	4+4	1
	MF	(Republic of Ireland) IRL	Steve Heighway	62	10	38+0	6	4+0	0	8+0	2	12+0	2
	DF	(England) ENG	Emlyn Hughes	65	12	41+0	7	4+0	0	8+0	2	12+0	3
	FW	(England) ENG	Kevin Keegan	64	22	41+0	13	4+0	0	8+0	5	11+0	4
	GK	(England) ENG	Frankie Lane	2	0	1+0	0	0+0	0	1+0	0	0+0	0
	DF	(England) ENG	Chris Lawler	66	4	42+0	3	4+0	0	8+0	0	12+0	1
	DF	(England) ENG	Alec Lindsay	59	5	37+0	4	4+0	0	7+0	0	11+0	1
	DF	(England) ENG	Larry Lloyd	66	3	42+0	2	4+0	0	8+0	0	12+0	1
	DF	(England) ENG	Tommy Smith	49	3	33+0	2	2+0	0	4+0	0	10+0	1
	DF	(England) ENG	Trevor Storton	10	0	4+0	0	0+0	0	4+0	0	1+1	0
	DF	(England) ENG	Phil Thompson	20	0	12+2	0	2+0	0	0+1	0	2+1	0
	FW	(Wales) WAL	John Toshack	40	17	22+0	13	4+0	2	6+0	1	6+2	1
	FW	(England) ENG	Jack Whitham	1	0	0+0	0	0+0	0	0+0	0	0+1	0

== League table ==
Pos	Team	Pld	W	D	L	GF	GA	GAv	Pts	Qualification or relegation
1	Liverpool (C)	42	25	10	7	72	42	1.714	60	Qualification for the European Cup first round
2	Arsenal	42	23	11	8	57	43	1.326	57	
3	Leeds United	42	21	11	10	71	45	1.578	53	Qualification for the UEFA Cup first round
4	Ipswich Town	42	17	14	11	55	45	1.222	48	Qualification for the UEFA Cup first round
5	Wolverhampton Wanderers	42	18	11	13	66	54	1.222	47	Qualification for the UEFA Cup first round

Source: World Football
Rules for classification: 1) Points; 2) Goal average; 3) Goals scored
(C) Champions

== Results ==
=== First Division ===
Date	Opponents	Venue	Result	Scorers	Attendance	Report 1	Report 2
12-Aug-72	Manchester City	H	2–0	Hall 3' Callaghan 84'	55,383	Report	Report
15-Aug-72	Manchester United	H	2–0	Toshack 12' Heighway 20'	54,779	Report	Report
19-Aug-72	Crystal Palace	A	1–1	Hughes 75'	30,054	Report	Report
23-Aug-72	Chelsea	A	2–1	Toshack 3' Callaghan 13'	35,375	Report	Report
26-Aug-72	West Ham United	H	3–2	Toshack 44' Ferguson (og) 62' Hughes 64'	50,491	Report	Report
30-Aug-72	Leicester City	A	2–3	Toshack 8', 16'	28,694	Report	Report
02-Sep-72	Derby County	A	1–2	Toshack 16'	32,524	Report	Report
09-Sep-72	Wolverhampton Wanderers	H	4–2	Hughes 28' Cormack 76' Smith 80 Pen' Keegan 84'	43,386	Report	Report
16-Sep-72	Arsenal	A	0–0		47,597	Report	Report
23-Sep-72	Sheffield United	H	5–0	Boersma 28' Lindsay 31' Heighway 33' Cormack 51' Keegan 54 Pen'	42,940	Report	Report
30-Sep-72	Leeds United	A	2–1	Lloyd 40' Boersma 65'	46,648	Report	Report
07-Oct-72	Everton	H	1–0	Cormack 77'	55,975	Report	Report
14-Oct-72	Southampton	A	1–1	Lawler 40'	24,110	Report	Report
21-Oct-72	Stoke City	H	2–1	Hughes 66' Callaghan 90'	45,604	Report	Report
28-Oct-72	Norwich City	A	1–1	Cormack 18'	36,625	Report	Report
04-Nov-72	Chelsea	H	3–1	Toshack 33', 55' Keegan 50'	48,392	Report	Report
11-Nov-72	Manchester United	A	0–2		53,944	Report	Report
18-Nov-72	Newcastle United	H	3–2	Cormack 5' Lindsay 35' Toshack 48'	46,153	Report	Report
25-Nov-72	Tottenham Hotspur	A	2–1	Heighway 28' Keegan 40'	45,399	Report	Report
02-Dec-72	Birmingham City	H	4–3	Lindsay 32', 55' Cormack 44' Toshack 77'	45,407	Report	Report
09-Dec-72	West Bromwich Albion	A	1–1	Boersma 21'	27,213	Report	Report
16-Dec-72	Ipswich Town	A	1–1	Heighway 24'	25,693	Report	Report
23-Dec-72	Coventry City	H	2–0	Toshack 6', 22'	41,550	Report	Report
26-Dec-72	Sheffield United	A	3–0	Boersma 27' Lawler 50' Heighway 81'	34,040	Report	Report
30-Dec-72	Crystal Palace	H	1–0	Cormack 66'	50,862	Report	Report
06-Jan-73	West Ham United	A	1–0	Keegan 75'	34,480	Report	Report
20-Jan-73	Derby County	H	1–1	Toshack 23'	45,996	Report	Report
27-Jan-73	Wolverhampton Wanderers	A	1–2	Keegan 17'	32,957	Report	Report
10-Feb-73	Arsenal	H	0–2		49,898	Report	Report
17-Feb-73	Manchester City	A	1–1	Boersma 77'	40,528	Report	Report
24-Feb-73	Ipswich Town	H	2–1	Heighway 67' Keegan 80'	43,875	Report	Report
03-Mar-73	Everton	A	2–0	Hughes 80', 88'	54,269	Report	Report
10-Mar-73	Southampton	H	3–2	Lloyd 37' Keegan 37', 87'	41,674	Report	Report
17-Mar-73	Stoke City	A	1–0	Mahoney (og) 65'	33,540	Report	Report
24-Mar-73	Norwich City	H	3–1	Lawler 50' Hughes 55' Hall 88'	42,995	Report	Report
31-Mar-73	Tottenham Hotspur	H	1–1	Keegan 70'	48,477	Report	Report
07-Apr-73	Birmingham City	A	1–2	Smith 60'	48,114	Report	Report
14-Apr-73	West Bromwich Albion	H	1–0	Keegan 14 Pen'	43,853	Report	Report
17-Apr-73	Coventry City	A	2–1	Boersma 36', 60'	27,280	Report	Report
21-Apr-73	Newcastle United	A	1–2	Keegan 24'	37,240	Report	Report
23-Apr-73	Leeds United	H	2–0	Cormack 47' Keegan 85'	55,738	Report	Report
28-Apr-73	Leicester City	H	0–0		56,202	Report	Report

=== Football League Cup ===
Date	Opponents	Venue	Result	Scorers	Attendance	Report 1	Report 2
05-Sep-72	Carlisle United	A	1–1	Keegan 42'	16,257	Report	Report
19-Sep-72	Carlisle United	H	5–1	Keegan 37' Boersma 39', 82' Lawler 73' Heighway 86'	22,128	Report	Report
03-Oct-72	West Bromwich Albion	A	1–1	Heighway 86'	17,756	Report	Report
10-Oct-72	West Bromwich Albion	H	2–1	Hughes 62' Keegan 120'	26,461	Report	Report
31-Oct-72	Leeds United	H	2–2	Keegan 31' Toshack 80'	44,609	Report	Report
22-Nov-72	Leeds United	A	1–0	Keegan 90'	34,856	Report	Report
04-Dec-72	Tottenham Hotspur	H	1–1	Hughes 78'	48,677	Report	Report
06-Dec-72	Tottenham Hotspur	A	1–3	Callaghan 85'	34,565	Report	Report

=== FA Cup ===
Date	Opponents	Venue	Result	Scorers	Attendance	Report 1	Report 2
13-Jan-73	Burnley	A	0–0		35,730	Report	Report
16-Jan-73	Burnley	H	3–0	Toshack 31', 49' Cormack 47'	56,124	Report	Report
03-Feb-73	Manchester City	H	0–0		56,296	Report	Report
07-Feb-73	Manchester City	A	0–2		49,572	Report	Report

=== UEFA Cup ===
Date	Opponents	Venue	Result	Scorers	Attendance	Report 1	Report 2
12-Sep-72	Eintracht Frankfurt	H	2–0	Keegan 12' Hughes 75'	33,380	Report	Report
26-Sep-72	Eintracht Frankfurt	A	0–0		17,500	Report	Report
24-Oct-72	AEK Athens	H	3–0	Boersma 9' Cormack 28' Smith 78 Pen'	31,906	Report	Report
07-Nov-72	AEK Athens	A	3–1	Hughes 18', 44' Boersma 87'	19,412	Report	Report
29-Nov-72	BFC Dynamo	A	0–0		15,835-20,000	Report	Report
13-Dec-72	BFC Dynamo	H	3–1	Boersma 1' Heighway 25' Toshack 56'	34,140	Report	Report
07-Mar-73	Dynamo Dresden	H	2–0	Hall 25' Boersma 60'	33,270	Report	Report
21-Mar-73	Dynamo Dresden	A	1–0	Keegan 53'	33,634	Report	Report
10-Apr-73	Tottenham Hotspur	H	1–0	Lindsay 17'	42,174	Report	Report
25-Apr-73	Tottenham Hotspur	A	1–2	Heighway 55'	46,919	Report	Report

Final

First Leg

10 May 1973
19:30 BST

Liverpool (England)	3–0	(West Germany) Borussia Mönchengladbach
Keegan 21', 32'; Lloyd 61'	Report; Report

Anfield, Liverpool
Attendance: 41,169
Referee: Erich Linemayr (Austria)

Liverpool	Borussia Mönchengladbach

GK	1	(England) Ray Clemence
RB	2	(England) Chris Lawler
LB	3	(England) Alec Lindsay
CM	4	(England) Tommy Smith (c)
CB	5	(England) Larry Lloyd
CB	6	(England) Emlyn Hughes
ST	7	(England) Kevin Keegan
CM	8	(Scotland) Peter Cormack
ST	9	(Wales) John Toshack
LW	10	(Republic of Ireland) Steve Heighway	(substituted off) 83'
RW	11	(England) Ian Callaghan
Substitutes:
MF	12	(England) Brian Hall	(substituted on) 83'
GK	13	(England) Frankie Lane
DF	14	(England) Trevor Storton
DF	15	(England) Phil Thompson
FW	16	(England) Phil Boersma
Manager:
(Scotland) Bill Shankly

GK	1	(Germany) Wolfgang Kleff
RB	2	(Germany) Heinz Michallik
CB	3	(Germany) Günter Netzer
CB	4	(Germany) Rainer Bonhof
LB	5	(Germany) Berti Vogts (c)
MF	6	(Germany) Herbert Wimmer
MF	7	(Germany) Dietmar Danner
MF	8	(Germany) Christian Kulik
FW	9	(Denmark) Henning Jensen
FW	10	(Germany) Bernd Rupp	(substituted off) 82'
FW	11	(Germany) Jupp Heynckes
Substitutes:
FW	12	(Denmark) Allan Simonsen	(substituted on) 82'
Manager:
(Germany) Hennes Weisweiler

Second Leg

23 May 1973
19:30 CEST

Borussia Mönchengladbach (West Germany)	2–0	(England) Liverpool
Heynckes 29', 40'	Report; Report

Bökelbergstadion, Mönchengladbach
Attendance: 34,905
Referee: Pavel Kazakov (Soviet Union)

Borussia Mönchengladbach	Liverpool

GK	1	(Germany) Wolfgang Kleff
RB	2	(Germany) Ulrich Surau
CB	3	(Germany) Günter Netzer
CB	4	(Germany) Rainer Bonhof
LB	5	(Germany) Berti Vogts (c)
MF	6	(Germany) Herbert Wimmer
MF	7	(Germany) Dietmar Danner
MF	8	(Germany) Christian Kulik
FW	9	(Denmark) Henning Jensen
FW	10	(Germany) Bernd Rupp
FW	11	(Germany) Jupp Heynckes
Substitutes:
FW	12	(Denmark) Allan Simonsen
DF	13	(Germany) Heinz Michallik
DF	14	(Germany) Klaus-Dieter Sieloff
GK	15	(Germany) Bernd Schrage
Manager:
(Germany) Hennes Weisweiler

GK	1	(England) Ray Clemence
RB	2	(England) Chris Lawler
LB	3	(England) Alec Lindsay
CM	4	(England) Tommy Smith (c)
CB	5	(England) Larry Lloyd
CB	6	(England) Emlyn Hughes
ST	7	(England) Kevin Keegan
CM	8	(Scotland) Peter Cormack
ST	9	(Wales) John Toshack
LW	10	(Republic of Ireland) Steve Heighway	(substituted off) 77'
RW	11	(England) Ian Callaghan
Substitutes:
MF	12	(England) Brian Hall
GK	13	(England) Frankie Lane
DF	14	(England) Trevor Storton
DF	15	(England) Phil Thompson
FW	16	(England) Phil Boersma	(substituted on) 77'
Manager:
(Scotland) Bill Shankly
