= 1973–74 Liverpool F.C. season =

English football club season

Liverpool F.C.
1973–74 season
- Chairman: John W Smith
- Manager: Bill Shankly
- First Division: 2nd
- European Cup: Second round
- FA Cup: Winners
- League Cup: Fifth round
- Top goalscorer: League: Kevin Keegan (12); All: Kevin Keegan (19)
- Average home league attendance: 42,427
Home colours	Away colours

The 1973–74 season was Liverpool Football Club's 82nd season in existence and their 12th consecutive season in the First Division. Liverpool won the FA Cup in Bill Shankly's 14th and final season in charge. Announcing his retirement two months after winning 3–0 against Newcastle in the final, Shankly was hailed by the fans as a hero, when heading into retirement. Kevin Keegan scored twice in the final, further confirming his status among the Liverpool faithful. However, the club's second-place finishing in the league saw them lose their defence of the league title to Don Revie's Leeds United.

== Squad ==
=== Goalkeepers ===
- (England) Ray Clemence
- (England) Frankie Lane

=== Defenders ===
- (England) Roy Evans
- (England) Emlyn Hughes
- (England) Chris Lawler
- (England) Alec Lindsay
- (England) Larry Lloyd
- (England) John McLaughlin
- (England) Dave Rylands
- (England) Tommy Smith
- (England) Phil Thompson

=== Midfielders ===
- (England) Ian Callaghan
- (Scotland) Peter Cormack
- (Scotland) Brian Hall
- (Republic of Ireland) Steve Heighway
- (England) Hughie McAuley
- (England) Peter Spiring
- (England) Max Thompson
- (England) Peter Thompson

=== Attackers ===
- (England) Phil Boersma
- (England) Derek Brownbill
- (England) David Fairclough
- (England) Kevin Keegan
- (England) Kevin Kewley
- (Wales) John Toshack
- (England) Alan Waddle
- (England) Jack Whitham

== Squad statistics ==
=== Appearances and goals ===
No.	Pos	Nat	Player	Total		Division 1		FA Cup		League Cup		European Cup	
No.	Pos	Nat	Player	Apps	Goals	Apps	Goals	Apps	Goals	Apps	Goals	Apps	Goals
	FW	(England) ENG	Phil Boersma	22	4	13+2	3	4+1	1	0+0	0	1+1	0
	FW	(England) ENG	Derek Brownbill	1	0	1+0	0	0+0	0	0+0	0	0+0	0
	MF	(England) ENG	Ian Callaghan	61	3	42+0	0	9+0	0	6+0	3	4+0	0
	GK	(England) ENG	Ray Clemence	61	0	42+0	0	9+0	0	6+0	0	4+0	0
	MF	(Scotland) SCO	Peter Cormack	57	11	40+2	9	8+0	1	6+0	1	1+0	0
	DF	(England) ENG	Roy Evans	2	0	2+0	0	0+0	0	0+0	0	0+0	0
	MF	(Scotland) SCO	Brian Hall	34	7	20+2	4	7+1	2	1+0	0	2+1	1
	MF	(Republic of Ireland) IRL	Steve Heighway	52	8	35+1	5	6+0	2	6+0	1	4+0	0
	DF	(England) ENG	Emlyn Hughes	61	2	42+0	2	9+0	0	6+0	0	4+0	0
	FW	(England) ENG	Kevin Keegan	61	19	42+0	12	9+0	6	6+0	1	4+0	0
	DF	(England) ENG	Chris Lawler	25	4	18+0	2	0+0	0	3+0	0	4+0	2
	DF	(England) ENG	Alec Lindsay	54	4	36+0	4	9+0	0	6+0	0	3+0	0
	DF	(England) ENG	Larry Lloyd	40	1	27+0	1	3+0	0	6+0	0	4+0	0
	MF	(England) ENG	John McLaughlin	2	0	1+0	0	0+0	0	0+0	0	1+0	0
	DF	(England) ENG	Dave Rylands	1	0	0+0	0	1+0	0	0+0	0	0+0	0
	DF	(England) ENG	Tommy Smith	49	1	34+0	1	7+0	0	5+0	0	3+0	0
	DF	(England) ENG	Trevor Storton	2	0	1+0	0	1+0	0	0+0	0	0+0	0
	DF	(England) ENG	Max Thompson	1	0	1+0	0	0+0	0	0+0	0	0+0	0
	DF	(England) ENG	Phil Thompson	51	2	35+0	2	9+0	0	4+0	0	2+1	0
	FW	(Wales) WAL	John Toshack	30	11	19+0	5	6+0	3	2+0	2	3+0	1
	FW	(England) ENG	Alan Waddle	16	1	11+0	1	2+0	0	3+0	0	0+0	0

== League table ==
Pos	Team	Pld	W	D	L	GF	GA	GAv	Pts	Qualification or relegation
1	Leeds United (C)	42	24	14	4	66	31	2.129	62	Qualification for the European Cup first round
2	Liverpool	42	22	13	7	52	31	1.677	57	Qualification for the European Cup Winners' Cup first round (Note: Liverpool qualified for the European Cup Winners' Cup as the 1973-74 FA Cup winners.)
3	Derby County	42	17	14	11	52	42	1.238	48	Qualification for the UEFA Cup first round
4	Ipswich Town	42	18	11	13	67	58	1.155	47	Qualification for the UEFA Cup first round
5	Stoke City	42	15	16	11	54	42	1.286	46	Qualification for the UEFA Cup first round

Source: World Football
Rules for classification: 1) Points; 2) Goal average; 3) Goals scored
(C) Champions

== Results ==
=== First Division ===
Date	Opponents	Venue	Result	Scorers	Attendance	Report 1	Report 2
25-Aug-73	Stoke City	H	1–0	Heighway 6'	52,935	Report	Report
28-Aug-73	Coventry City	A	0–1		29,305	Report	Report
01-Sep-73	Leicester City	A	1–1	Toshack 50'	29,347	Report	Report
04-Sep-73	Derby County	H	2–0	Thompson 35' Keegan 85 Pen'	45,237	Report	Report
08-Sep-73	Chelsea	H	1–0	Keegan 35'	47,016	Report	Report
12-Sep-73	Derby County	A	1–3	Boersma 26'	32,867	Report	Report
15-Sep-73	Birmingham City	A	1–1	Hall 85'	35,719	Report	Report
22-Sep-73	Tottenham Hotspur	H	3–2	Lawler 28', 90' Lindsay 76 Pen'	42,901	Report	Report
29-Sep-73	Manchester United	A	0–0		53,882	Report	Report
06-Oct-73	Newcastle United	H	2–1	Cormack 20' Lindsay 86 Pen'	45,612	Report	Report
13-Oct-73	Southampton	A	0–1		22,018	Report	Report
20-Oct-73	Leeds United	A	0–1		44,911	Report	Report
27-Oct-73	Sheffield United	H	1–0	Keegan 26'	40,641	Report	Report
03-Nov-73	Arsenal	A	2–0	Hughes 77' Toshack 85'	39,837	Report	Report
10-Nov-73	Wolverhampton Wanderers	H	1–0	Heighway 22'	38,088	Report	Report
17-Nov-73	Ipswich Town	H	4–2	Keegan 27', 22 Pen', 90' Cormack 44'	37,420	Report	Report
24-Nov-73	Queens Park Rangers	A	2–2	Lloyd 26' Toshack 75'	26,254	Report	Report
01-Dec-73	West Ham United	H	1–0	Cormack 14'	34,857	Report	Report
08-Dec-73	Everton	A	1–0	Waddle 67'	56,098	Report	Report
15-Dec-73	Norwich City	A	1–1	Cormack 17'	20,628	Report	Report
22-Dec-73	Manchester United	H	2–0	Keegan 30 Pen' Heighway 65'	40,420	Report	Report
26-Dec-73	Burnley	A	1–2	Cormack 84'	24,404	Report	Report
29-Dec-73	Chelsea	A	1–0	Cormack 21'	32,901	Report	Report
01-Jan-74	Leicester City	H	1–1	Cormack 67'	39,110	Report	Report
12-Jan-74	Birmingham City	H	3–2	Keegan 15', 31' Thompson 69'	39,094	Report	Report
19-Jan-74	Stoke City	A	1–1	Smith 90'	32,789	Report	Report
02-Feb-74	Norwich City	H	1–0	Cormack 90'	31,742	Report	Report
05-Feb-74	Coventry City	H	2–1	Lindsay 28 Pen' Keegan 57'	21,656	Report	Report
23-Feb-74	Newcastle United	A	0–0		41,727	Report	Report
26-Feb-74	Southampton	H	1–0	Boersma 87'	27,015	Report	Report
02-Mar-74	Burnley	H	1–0	Toshack 89'	42,562	Report	Report
16-Mar-74	Leeds United	H	1–0	Heighway 82'	56,003	Report	Report
23-Mar-74	Wolverhampton Wanderers	A	1–0	Hall 27'	35,867	Report	Report
06-Apr-74	Queens Park Rangers	H	2–1	Lindsay 7 Pen' Own goal 29'	54,027	Report	Report
08-Apr-74	Sheffield United	A	0–1		31,089	Report	Report
12-Apr-74	Manchester City	A	1–1	Cormack 18'	43,284	Report	Report
13-Apr-74	Ipswich Town	A	1–1	Hughes 62'	33,285	Report	Report
16-Apr-74	Manchester City	H	4–0	Hall 3', 12' Boersma 16' Keegan 35'	50,781	Report	Report
20-Apr-74	Everton	H	0–0		55,858	Report	Report
24-Apr-74	Arsenal	H	0–1		47,997	Report	Report
27-Apr-74	West Ham United	A	2–2	Toshack 58' Keegan 90'	36,160	Report	Report
08-May-74	Tottenham Hotspur	A	1–1	Heighway 67'	24,178	Report	Report

=== Football League Cup ===
Date	Opponents	Venue	Result	Scorers	Attendance	Report 1	Report 2
08-Oct-73	West Ham United	A	2–2	Cormack 34' Heighway 55'	25,823	Report	Report
29-Oct-73	West Ham United	H	1–0	Toshack 22'	26,002	Report	Report
21-Nov-73	Sunderland	H	2–0	Keegan 12' Toshack 47'	36,208	Report	Report
27-Nov-73	Hull City	A	0–0		19,748	Report	Report
04-Dec-73	Hull City	H	3–1	Callaghan 12', 19', 73'	17,120	Report	Report
19-Dec-73	Wolverhampton Wanderers	A	0–1		15,242	Report	Report

=== European Cup ===
Date	Opponents	Venue	Result	Scorers	Attendance	Report 1	Report 2
19-Sep-73	Jeunesse Esch	A	1–1	Hall 43'	7,000	Report	Report
03-Oct-73	Jeunesse Esch	H	2–0	Own goal 47' Toshack 56'	28,714	Report	Report
24-Oct-73	FK Crvena Zvezda	A	1–2	Lawler 72'	30,000	Report	Report
06-Nov-73	FK Crvena Zvezda	H	1–2	Lawler 84'	41,774	Report	Report

=== FA Cup ===
Date	Opponents	Venue	Result	Scorers	Attendance	Report 1	Report 2
05-Jan-74	Doncaster Rovers	H	2–2	Keegan 3', 57'	31,483	Report	Report
08-Jan-74	Doncaster Rovers	A	2–0	Heighway 15' Cormack 60'	22,499	Report	Report
26-Jan-74	Carlisle United	H	0–0		47,211	Report	Report
29-Jan-74	Carlisle United	A	2–0	Boersma 50' Toshack 81'	21,262	Report	Report
16-Feb-74	Ipswich Town	H	2–0	Hall 33' Keegan 55'	45,340	Report	Report
09-Mar-74	Bristol City	A	1–0	Toshack 48'	37,671	Report	Report
30-Mar-74	Leicester City	N	0–0		60,000	Report	Report
03-Apr-74	Leicester City	N	3–1	Hall 46' Keegan 62' Toshack 86'	55,619	Report	Report

=== Final ===
4 May 1974
15:00 BST

Liverpool	3–0	Newcastle United
Keegan 57, 88'; Heighway 74'	Report; Report

Wembley, London
Attendance: 100,000
Referee: Gordon Kew

Liverpool	Newcastle

GK	1	(England) Ray Clemence
RB	2	(England) Tommy Smith
LB	3	(England) Alec Lindsay
CB	4	(England) Phil Thompson
CM	5	(Scotland) Peter Cormack
CB	6	(England) Emlyn Hughes (c)
CF	7	(England) Kevin Keegan
CM	8	(England) Brian Hall
LM	9	(Republic of Ireland) Steve Heighway
CF	10	(Wales) John Toshack
RM	11	(England) Ian Callaghan
Substitute:
DF	12	(England) Chris Lawler
Manager:
(Scotland) Bill Shankly

GK	1	(Northern Ireland) Iam McFaul
RB	2	(England) Frank Clark
LB	3	(England) Alan Kennedy
CM	4	(England) Terry McDermott
CB	5	(England) Pat Howard
CB	6	(Scotland) Bobby Moncur (c)
RW	7	(Scotland) Jimmy Smith	(substituted off) 70'
CM	8	(Northern Ireland) Tommy Cassidy
ST	9	(England) Malcolm Macdonald
ST	10	(England) John Tudor
LW	11	(England) Terry Hibbitt
Substitute:
MF	12	(Scotland) Tommy Gibb	(substituted on) 70'
Manager:
(England) Joe Harvey

Match rules

- 90 minutes.
- 30 minutes of extra-time if necessary.
- Replay if scores still level.
- One named substitute.
