= 1974–75 Liverpool F.C. season =

English football club season

Liverpool F.C.
1974–75 season
- Chairman: John W Smith
- Manager: Bob Paisley
- First Division: 2nd
- FA Cup: Fourth round
- League Cup: Fourth round
- FA Charity Shield: Winners
- Cup Winners' Cup: Second round
- Top goalscorer: League: John Toshack (12); All: Steve Heighway (13)
- Average home league attendance: 45,966
Home colours	Away colours

The 1974–75 season was Liverpool Football Club's 83rd season in existence and their 13th consecutive season in the First Division. Liverpool had a trophyless first season under the guidance of Bob Paisley, who took over as manager following the retirement of Bill Shankly after nearly 15 years at the helm. They did finish second in the First Division behind champions Derby County, in a record-tight season that saw the top ten teams separated by less than ten points. A defeat in the penultimate round against newcomers Middlesbrough cost Liverpool a ninth league title.

It did however beat the club record for biggest victory, eclipsing Strømsgodset from Norway by 11–0 in the Cup Winners' Cup.

== Squad ==
=== Goalkeepers ===
- (England) Ray Clemence
- (England) Frank Lane
- (England) Peter McDonnell

=== Defenders ===
- (England) Emlyn Hughes
- (England) Brian Kettle
- (England) Chris Lawler
- (England) Alec Lindsay
- (England) John McLaughlin
- (England) Phil Neal
- (England) Tommy Smith
- (England) Phil Thompson

=== Midfielders ===
- (England) Ian Callaghan
- (England) Jimmy Case
- (Scotland) Peter Cormack
- (Scotland) Brian Hall
- (Republic of Ireland) Steve Heighway
- (England) Ray Kennedy
- (England) Terry McDermott
- (England) Peter Spiring
- (England) Max Thompson

=== Attackers ===
- (England) Phil Boersma
- (England) Derek Brownbill
- (England) David Fairclough
- (England) Kevin Keegan
- (England) Kevin Kewley
- (Wales) John Toshack
- (England) Alan Waddle

== Squad statistics ==
=== Appearances and goals ===
No.	Pos	Nat	Player	Total		Division 1		FA Cup		Charity Shield		League Cup		European CWC	
No.	Pos	Nat	Player	Apps	Goals	Apps	Goals	Apps	Goals	Apps	Goals	Apps	Goals	Apps	Goals
	FW	(England) ENG	Phil Boersma	29	10	20+1	6	0	0	1+0	1	3+0	1	4+0	2
	MF	(England) ENG	Ian Callaghan	51	2	41+0	1	2	0	1+0	0	3+0	0	4+0	1
	MF	(England) ENG	Jimmy Case	1	0	1+0	0	0	0	0+0	0	0+0	0	0+0	0
	GK	(England) ENG	Ray Clemence	53	0	42+0	0	2	0	1+0	0	4+0	0	4+0	0
	MF	(Scotland) SCO	Peter Cormack	45	4	33+3	3	2	0	1+0	0	3+0	0	1+2	1
	MF	(Scotland) SCO	Brian Hall	45	5	35+0	5	2	0	1+0	0	3+0	0	4+0	0
	MF	(Republic of Ireland) IRL	Steve Heighway	46	13	32+3	9	2	1	1+0	0	4+0	2	4+0	1
	DF	(England) ENG	Emlyn Hughes	53	2	42+0	1	2	0	1+0	0	4+0	0	4+0	1
	FW	(England) ENG	Kevin Keegan	42	12	33+0	10	2	1	1+0	0	3+0	0	3+0	1
	MF	(England) ENG	Ray Kennedy	35	10	23+2	5	2	0	0+0	0	4+0	3	4+0	2
	DF	(England) ENG	Chris Lawler	16	0	10+0	0	0	0	0+0	0	3+0	0	3+0	0
	DF	(England) ENG	Alec Lindsay	36	4	25+0	3	2	0	1+0	0	4+0	0	4+0	1
	MF	(England) ENG	Terry McDermott	15	2	14+1	2	0	0	0+0	0	0+0	0	0+0	0
	MF	(England) ENG	John McLaughlin	1	0	0+0	0	0	0	0+0	0	1+0	0	0+0	0
	DF	(England) ENG	Phil Neal	25	0	23+0	0	2	0	0+0	0	0+0	0	0+0	0
	DF	(England) ENG	Tommy Smith	36	2	36+0	2	0	0	0+0	0	0+0	0	0+0	0
	DF	(England) ENG	Phil Thompson	43	1	32+0	0	2	0	1+0	0	4+0	0	4+0	1
	FW	(Wales) WAL	John Toshack	25	12	20+1	12	2	0	0+0	0	0+0	0	0+2	0
	FW	(England) ENG	Alan Waddle	5	0	0+5	0	0	0	0+0	0	0+0	0	0+0	0

== League table ==
Pos	Team	Pld	W	D	L	GF	GA	GAv	Pts	Qualification or relegation
1	Derby County (C)	42	21	11	10	67	49	1.367	53	Qualification for the European Cup first round
2	Liverpool	42	20	11	11	60	39	1.538	51	Qualification for the UEFA Cup first round
3	Ipswich Town	42	23	5	14	66	44	1.500	51	Qualification for the UEFA Cup first round
4	Everton	42	16	18	8	56	42	1.333	50	Qualification for the UEFA Cup first round
5	Stoke City	42	17	15	10	64	48	1.333	49	

Source: World Football
Rules for classification: 1) Points; 2) Goal average; 3) Goals scored
(C) Champions

== Results ==
=== First Division ===
Date	Opponents	Venue	Result	Scorers	Attendance	Report 1	Report 2
17 Aug 74	Luton Town	A	2–1	Smith 21' Heighway 74'	21,062	Report	Report
20 Aug 74	Wolverhampton Wanderers	A	0–0		33,499	Report	Report
24 Aug 74	Leicester City	H	2–1	Lindsay 1 Pen', 65 Pen'	49,398	Report	Report
27 Aug 74	Wolverhampton Wanderers	H	2–0	Heighway 51' Toshack 56'	42,449	Report	Report
31 Aug 74	Chelsea	A	3–0	Kennedy 22' Boersma 34', 76'	39,461	Report	Report
07 Sep 74	Tottenham Hotspur	H	5–2	Boersma 4', 9', 41' Hughes 71' Kennedy 87'	47,538	Report	Report
14 Sep 74	Manchester City	A	0–2		45,194	Report	Report
21 Sep 74	Stoke City	H	3–0	Ritchie (og) 43' Boersma 45' Heighway 55'	51,423	Report	Report
24 Sep 74	Burnley	H	0–1		44,639	Report	Report
28 Sep 74	Sheffield United	A	0–1		29,443	Report	Report
05 Oct 74	Carlisle United	A	1–0	Kennedy 36'	20,844	Report	Report
12 Oct 74	Middlesbrough	H	2–0	Callaghan 57' Keegan 83'	52,590	Report	Report
19 Oct 74	Queens Park Rangers	A	1–0	Hall 6'	27,392	Report	Report
26 Oct 74	Leeds United	H	1–0	Heighway 73'	54,996	Report	Report
02 Nov 74	Ipswich Town	A	0–1		30,564	Report	Report
09 Nov 74	Arsenal	H	1–3	Kennedy 53'	43,850	Report	Report
16 Nov 74	Everton	A	0–0		56,797	Report	Report
23 Nov 74	West Ham United	H	1–1	Smith 12'	46,348	Report	Report
30 Nov 74	Coventry City	A	1–1	Keegan 48'	23,089	Report	Report
07 Dec 74	Derby County	H	2–2	Kennedy 18' Heighway 22'	41,058	Report	Report
14 Dec 74	Luton Town	H	2–0	Toshack 46' Heighway 85'	35,151	Report	Report
21 Dec 74	Birmingham City	A	1–3	Toshack 43'	23,608	Report	Report
26 Dec 74	Manchester City	H	4–1	Hall 22', 72' Toshack 25' Heighway 41'	46,062	Report	Report
11 Jan 75	Derby County	A	0–2		33,463	Report	Report
18 Jan 75	Coventry City	H	2–1	Heighway 35' Keegan 89'	43,668	Report	Report
01 Feb 75	Arsenal	A	0–2		43,028	Report	Report
08 Feb 75	Ipswich Town	H	5–2	Hall 6' Toshack 9', 65' Lindsay 42' Cormack 87'	47,421	Report	Report
12 Feb 75	Newcastle United	A	1–4	Hall 61'	38,115	Report	Report
19 Feb 75	West Ham United	A	0–0		40,256	Report	Report
22 Feb 75	Everton	H	0–0		55,853	Report	Report
01 Mar 75	Chelsea	H	2–2	Heighway 40' Cormack 89'	42,762	Report	Report
08 Mar 75	Burnley	A	1–1	McDermott 74'	31,812	Report	Report
15 Mar 75	Sheffield United	H	0–0		40,862	Report	Report
19 Mar 75	Leicester City	A	1–1	Toshack 35'	28,012	Report	Report
22 Mar 75	Tottenham Hotspur	A	2–0	Keegan 46' Cormack 66'	34,331	Report	Report
25 Mar 75	Newcastle United	H	4–0	Keegan 7' Toshack 43', 70' McDermott 72'	41,147	Report	Report
29 Mar 75	Birmingham City	H	1–0	Keegan 64 Pen'	49,454	Report	Report
31 Mar 75	Stoke City	A	0–2		45,954	Report	Report
05 Apr 75	Leeds United	A	2–0	Keegan 41', 51'	34,971	Report	Report
12 Apr 75	Carlisle United	H	2–0	Toshack 64' Keegan 74'	46,073	Report	Report
19 Apr 75	Middlesbrough	A	0–1		34,027	Report	Report
26 Apr 75	Queens Park Rangers	H	3–1	Toshack 16', 85' Keegan 52 Pen'	42,546	Report	Report

=== FA Charity Shield ===
10 August 1974
15:00

Liverpool	1–1	Leeds United
Boersma 19'	Report; Report; Report	Cherry 70'
Penalties
Lindsay (penalty scored); Hughes (penalty scored); Hall (penalty scored); Smith (penalty scored); Cormack (penalty scored); Callaghan (penalty scored)	6–5	(penalty scored) Lorimer; (penalty scored) Giles; (penalty scored) Gray; (penalty scored) Hunter; (penalty scored) Cherry; (penalty missed) Harvey

Wembley Stadium, London
Attendance: 67,000
Referee: Bob Matthewson

Liverpool	Leeds United

GK	1	(England) Ray Clemence
RB	2	(England) Tommy Smith
LB	3	(England) Alec Lindsay
CB	4	(England) Phil Thompson
CM	5	(Scotland) Peter Cormack
CB	6	(England) Emlyn Hughes
CF	7	(England) Kevin Keegan	(red card) 60'
CM	8	(England) Brian Hall
LM	9	(Republic of Ireland) Steve Heighway
CF	10	(England) Phil Boersma
RM	11	(England) Ian Callaghan
Substitutes:
GK	13	(England) Peter McDonnell
DF	12	(England) Brian Kettle
MF	14	(England) John McLaughlin
DF	15	(England) Max Thompson
MF	16	(England) Peter Spiring
Manager:
(England) Bob Paisley

GK	1	(England) David Harvey
RB	2	(England) Paul Reaney
LB	3	(England) Trevor Cherry
CM	4	(Scotland) Billy Bremner	(red card) 60'
CB	5	(Scotland) Gordon McQueen
CB	6	(England) Norman Hunter
CM	7	(Scotland) Peter Lorimer
CF	8	(England) Allan Clarke	Substituted off
CF	9	(Scotland) Joe Jordan
RM	10	(Republic of Ireland) John Giles
LM	11	(Scotland) Eddie Gray
Substitutes:
MF	12	(England) Duncan McKenzie	Substituted in
Manager:
(England) Brian Clough

=== FA Cup ===
Date	Opponents	Venue	Result	Scorers	Attendance	Report 1	Report 2
04 Jan 75	Stoke City	H	2–0	Heighway 78' Keegan 89'	32,363	Report	Report
25 Jan 75	Ipswich Town	A	0–1		38,200	Report	Report

=== Football League Cup ===
Date	Opponents	Venue	Result	Scorers	Attendance	Report 1	Report 2
10 Sep 74	Brentford	H	2–1	Kennedy 30' Boersma 44'	21,413	Report	Report
08 Oct 74	Bristol City	A	0–0		25,573	Report	Report
16 Oct 74	Bristol City	H	4–0	Heighway 38', 75' Kennedy 48', 82'	23,694	Report	Report
12 Nov 74	Middlesbrough	H	0–1		24,906	Report	Report

=== European Cup Winners' Cup ===
Date	Opponents	Venue	Result	Scorers	Attendance	Report 1	Report 2
17 Sep 74	Strømsgodset	H	11–0	Lindsay 3' (pen.) Boersma 13', 40' P. Thompson 30', 74' Heighway 42' Cormack 65' Hughes 76' Smith 85' Callaghan 87' Kennedy 88'	21,413	Report	Report
01 Oct 74	Strømsgodset	A	1–0	Kennedy 17'	25,573	Report	Report
23 Oct 74	Ferencváros	H	1–1	Kevin Keegan 36'	23,694	Report	Report
05 Nov 74	Ferencváros	A	0–0		24,906	Report	Report
