= 1971–72 Liverpool F.C. season =

English football club season

Liverpool F.C.
1971–72 season
- Chairman: H.E. Roberts
- Manager: Bill Shankly
- First Division: 3rd
- FA Cup: Fourth round
- League Cup: Fourth round
- Charity Shield: Runners-up
- Cup Winners' Cup: Second round
- Top goalscorer: League: John Toshack (13); All: John Toshack (13)
- Average home league attendance: 47,689
Home colours	Away colours

The 1971–72 season was Liverpool Football Club's 80th season in existence and their tenth consecutive season in the First Division. Liverpool fought for the league title for the first time in three years, finishing third, just one point behind champions Derby. Liverpool's second attempt at the UEFA Cup Winners' Cup ended in disappointment following an autumn defeat to Bayern Munich. The season saw the breakthrough of youngster Kevin Keegan. The attacking midfielder played an integral part in the team, assisting several goals and scoring nine himself, after moving to the striker position.

Another player who had come through the youth system and made his debut as a substitute for John Toshack against Manchester United on Easter Monday was Phil Thompson who would become an integral part of the team for the rest of the decade.

== Squad ==
=== Goalkeepers ===
- (England) Ray Clemence
- (Scotland) Tommy Lawrence

=== Defenders ===
- (England) Roy Evans
- (England) Chris Lawler
- (England) Alec Lindsay
- (England) Larry Lloyd
- (England) John McLaughlin
- (Scotland) Ian Ross
- (England) Tommy Smith

=== Midfielders ===
- (England) Steve Arnold
- (England) Ian Callaghan
- (Scotland) Brian Hall
- (Republic of Ireland) Steve Heighway
- (England) Emlyn Hughes
- (Scotland) Ian St. John
- (England) Phil Thompson
- (England) Peter Thompson

=== Attackers ===
- (England) Phil Boersma
- (England) Alun Evans
- (Scotland) Bobby Graham
- (England) Kevin Keegan
- (Wales) John Toshack
- (England) Jack Whitham

== Squad statistics ==
=== Appearances and goals ===
No.	Pos	Nat	Player	Total		Division 1		FA Cup		Charity Shield		League Cup		European CWC	
No.	Pos	Nat	Player	Apps	Goals	Apps	Goals	Apps	Goals	Apps	Goals	Apps	Goals	Apps	Goals
	FW	(England) ENG	Phil Boersma	7	0	3+3	0	0+1	0	0+0	0	0+0	0	0+0	0
	MF	(England) ENG	Ian Callaghan	52	2	41+0	2	3+0	0	1+0	0	3+0	0	4+0	0
	GK	(England) ENG	Ray Clemence	53	0	42+0	0	3+0	0	1+0	0	3+0	0	4+0	0
	FW	(England) ENG	Alun Evans	13	2	6+0	1	1+0	0	1+0	0	2+0	0	2+1	1
	FW	(Scotland) SCO	Bobby Graham	20	3	10+1	2	1+1	0	1+0	0	2+1	1	3+0	0
	MF	(Scotland) SCO	Brian Hall	33	2	24+2	1	1+0	0	1+0	0	2+0	1	3+0	0
	MF	(Republic of Ireland) IRL	Steve Heighway	50	8	40+0	5	2+0	0	1+0	0	3+0	2	4+0	1
	DF	(England) ENG	Emlyn Hughes	53	9	42+0	8	3+0	0	1+0	0	3+0	0	4+0	1
	FW	(England) ENG	Kevin Keegan	42	11	35+0	9	3+0	2	0+0	0	1+0	0	3+0	0
	DF	(England) ENG	Chris Lawler	53	8	42+0	6	3+0	0	1+0	0	3+0	1	4+0	1
	DF	(England) ENG	Alec Lindsay	45	1	38+0	0	3+0	1	1+0	0	1+0	0	2+0	0
	DF	(England) ENG	Larry Lloyd	43	1	33+0	1	2+0	0	1+0	0	3+0	0	4+0	0
	MF	(England) ENG	John McLaughlin	6	0	3+2	0	0+0	0	0+0	0	1+0	0	0+0	0
	DF	(Scotland) SCO	Ian Ross	31	1	20+1	1	3+0	0	0+0	0	3+0	0	3+1	0
	DF	(England) ENG	Tommy Smith	45	6	37+0	6	3+0	0	1+0	0	3+0	0	1+0	0
	MF	(England) ENG	Peter Thompson	15	0	9+1	0	1+0	0	0+1	0	1+0	0	0+2	0
	DF	(England) ENG	Phil Thompson	1	0	0+1	0	0+0	0	0+0	0	0+0	0	0+0	0
	FW	(Wales) WAL	John Toshack	34	13	28+1	13	1+0	0	0+1	0	1+1	0	1+0	0
	FW	(England) ENG	Jack Whitham	9	6	9+0	6	0+0	0	0+0	0	0+0	0	0+0	0

== League table ==
Pos	Team	Pld	W	D	L	GF	GA	GAv	Pts	Qualification or relegation
1	Derby County (C)	42	24	10	8	69	33	2.091	58	Qualification for the European Cup first round
2	Leeds United	42	24	9	9	73	31	2.355	57	Qualification for the European Cup Winners' Cup first round (Note: Leeds United qualified for the European Cup Winners' Cup as the 1971-72 FA Cup winners.)
3	Liverpool	42	24	9	9	64	30	2.133	57	Qualification for the UEFA Cup first round
4	Manchester City	42	23	11	8	77	45	1.711	57	Qualification for the UEFA Cup first round
5	Arsenal	42	22	8	12	58	40	1.450	52	

Source: World Football
Rules for classification: 1) Points; 2) Goal average; 3) Goals scored
(C) Champions

== Results ==
=== First Division ===
Date	Opponents	Venue	Result	Scorers	Attendance	Report 1	Report 2
14-Aug-71	Nottingham Forest	H	3–1	Keegan 12' Smith 15 Pen' Hughes 55'	51,427	Report	Report
17-Aug-71	Wolverhampton Wanderers	H	3–2	Toshack 7' Smith 89 Pen'	51,869	Report	Report
21-Aug-71	Newcastle United	A	2–3	Hughes 10' Keegan 75'	39,720	Report	Report
24-Aug-71	Crystal Palace	A	1–0	Toshack 57'	29,489	Report	Report
28-Aug-71	Leicester City	H	3–2	Heighway 25' Keegan 35' Toshack 71'	50,970	Report	Report
01-Sep-71	Manchester City	A	0–1		45,144	Report	Report
04-Sep-71	Tottenham Hotspur	A	0–2		50,124	Report	Report
11-Sep-71	Southampton	H	1–0	Toshack 32'	45,878	Report	Report
18-Sep-71	Leeds United	A	0–1		41,381	Report	Report
25-Sep-71	Manchester United	H	2–2	Graham 7' Hall 24'	55,634	Report	Report
02-Oct-71	Stoke City	A	0–0		28,698	Report	Report
09-Oct-71	Chelsea	H	0–0		48,464	Report	Report
16-Oct-71	Nottingham Forest	A	3–2	Hughes 5' Heighway 65' Smith 78 Pen'	20,945	Report	Report
23-Oct-71	Huddersfield Town	H	2–0	Smith 57' A. Evans 80'	41,627	Report	Report
30-Oct-71	Sheffield United	A	1–1	Keegan 47'	39,023	Report	Report
06-Nov-71	Arsenal	H	3–2	Hughes 41' Callaghan 55' Ross 80'	46,929	Report	Report
13-Nov-71	Everton	A	0–1		56,563	Report	Report
20-Nov-71	Coventry City	A	2–0	Whitham 80', 89'	25,325	Report	Report
27-Nov-71	West Ham United	H	1–0	Hughes 69'	43,399	Report	Report
04-Dec-71	Ipswich Town	A	0–0		21,359	Report	Report
11-Dec-71	Derby County	H	3–2	Whitham 14', 44', 53'	44,601	Report	Report
18-Dec-71	Tottenham Hotspur	H	0–0		43,409	Report	Report
27-Dec-71	West Bromwich Albion	A	0–1		43,904	Report	Report
01-Jan-72	Leeds United	H	0–2		53,847	Report	Report
08-Jan-72	Leicester City	A	0–1		26,421	Report	Report
22-Jan-72	Wolverhampton Wanderers	A	0–0		33,692	Report	Report
29-Jan-72	Crystal Palace	H	4–1	Lawler 38', 66' Callaghan 72' Keegan 82'	39,538	Report	Report
12-Feb-72	Huddersfield Town	A	1–0	Whitham 73'	18,702	Report	Report
19-Feb-72	Sheffield United	H	2–0	Toshack 42', 82'	42,005	Report	Report
26-Feb-72	Manchester City	H	3–0	Lloyd 37' Keegan 53' Graham 65'	50,074	Report	Report
04-Mar-72	Everton	H	4–0	Own goal 1' Own goal 66' Lawler 74' Hughes 87'	53,922	Report	Report
11-Mar-72	Chelsea	A	0–0		38,691	Report	Report
18-Mar-72	Newcastle United	H	5–0	Lawler 9' Keegan 22' Toshack 39' Hughes 63' Heighway 81'	43,899	Report	Report
25-Mar-72	Southampton	A	1–0	Toshack 52'	21,680	Report	Report
28-Mar-72	Stoke City	H	2–1	Own goal 40' Keegan 53'	42,489	Report	Report
01-Apr-72	West Bromwich Albion	H	2–0	Smith 31 Pen' Lawler 58'	46,564	Report	Report
03-Apr-72	Manchester United	A	3–0	Lawler 60' Toshack 62' Hughes 84'	54,000	Report	Report
08-Apr-72	Coventry City	H	3–1	Keegan 21' Smith 67 Pen' Toshack 85'	50,628	Report	Report
15-Apr-72	West Ham United	A	2–0	Toshack 9' Heighway 46'	32,660	Report	Report
22-Apr-72	Ipswich Town	H	2–0	Toshack 39', 66'	54,316	Report	Report
01-May-72	Derby County	A	0–1		39,420	Report	Report
08-May-72	Arsenal	A	0–0		39,289	Report	Report

=== Football League Cup ===
Date	Opponents	Venue	Result	Scorers	Attendance	Report 1	Report 2
07-Sep-71	Hull City	A	3–0	Lawler 34' Heighway 38' Hall 53 Pen'	31,612	Report	Report
05-Oct-71	Southampton	H	1–0	Heighway 50'	29,964	Report	Report
27-Oct-71	West Ham United	A	1–2	Graham 30'	40,878	Report	Report

=== FA Cup ===
Date	Opponents	Venue	Result	Scorers	Attendance	Report 1	Report 2
15-Jan-72	Oxford United	H	3–0	Keegan 47', 81' Lindsay 84'	56,124	Report	Report
05-Feb-72	Leeds United	H	0–0		56,296	Report	Report
09-Feb-72	Leeds United	A	0–2		49,572	Report	Report

=== European Cup Winners Cup ===
Date	Opponents	Venue	Result	Scorers	Attendance	Report 1	Report 2
15-Sep-71	Servette FC	A	1–2	Lawler 81'	21,000	Report	Report
29-Sep-71	Servette FC	H	2–0	Hughes 27' Heighway 60'	38,591	Report	Report
20-Oct-71	Bayern Munich	H	0–0		42,949	Report	Report
03-Nov-71	Bayern Munich	A	1–3	A. Evans 37'	40,000	Report	Report

=== FA Charity Shield ===
7 August 1971

Leicester City	1–0	Liverpool
Whitworth 15'	Report

Filbert Street, Leicester
Attendance: 25,104
Referee: Pat Partridge
