= Chris Fagan =

Chris Fagan may refer to:

- Chris Fagan (coach) (born 1961), coach of the Brisbane Lions
- Chris Fagan (Irish footballer) (born 1989), Irish footballer for St Pat's Athletic
- Kit Fagan (Chris Fagan, born 1950), English football defender
