= Peter Cormack (footballer, born 1974) =

English-born Scottish footballer

Personal information
- Full name: Peter Cormack
- Date of birth: 8 June 1974 (age 52)
- Place of birth: Liverpool, England
- Position: Defender

Youth career
- Hutchison Vale

Senior career*
Years	Team	Apps	(Gls)
1990–1992	Meadowbank Thistle	2	(0)
1992–1994	Newcastle United	0	(0)
1994–1999	Greenock Morton	73	(6)
1999	→ Raith Rovers (loan)	1	(0)
1999	→ Stirling Albion (loan)	6	(0)
1999–2000	Clydebank	19	(2)
2000	Ross County	8	(0)
2000–2002	Stenhousemuir	37	(2)
2002–2004	Albion Rovers	49	(3)
2004–2005	Bo'ness United		
2005–2006	Arbroath	7	(0)
Total		234	(16)

International career
	Scotland U18	4	(0)
- * Club domestic league appearances and goals

Peter Cormack (born 8 June 1974 in Liverpool) is an English-born Scottish former professional footballer who played as a defender. His father is former Liverpool player Peter Cormack senior.

== Life and playing career ==
Cormack was born in Liverpool during his father's time with the Merseyside club. Following his father's return to Scotland, Cormack jr. started his career at the start of the 1990s with Edinburgh club Meadowbank Thistle, making two league appearances. He signed for Newcastle United but failed to make a first-team appearance and returned to Scotland in 1994 with Greenock Morton. Cormack was part of the Scottish Second Division-winning side in his first season, and he went on to make over seventy league appearances before loan spells at Raith Rovers and Stirling Albion at the end of his Morton career in 1999. After signing for Clydebank on a short-term deal at the start of 1999-00, he left to join Ross County, where he spent the second part of the season. Two-year spells with Stenhousemuir and Albion Rovers followed before a year out of the senior game with Bo'ness United. Cormack returned to senior football in 2005 with Arbroath on a short-term deal, which proved to be his last club.

He now owns a successful wealth management business in Edinburgh and is co-owner of a national sports management business called Quantum Sport.

== Honours ==
=== Morton ===
- Scottish Second Division: 1

1994-95
