= 1971 FA Cup final =

- Event: 1970–71 FA Cup
Arsenal	Liverpool
2	1
- After extra time
- Date: 8 May 1971
- Venue: Wembley Stadium, London
- Referee: Norman Burtenshaw (Gt Yarmouth)
- Attendance: 100,000
- Weather: Sunshine, Warm

In the 1971 FA Cup final Arsenal met Liverpool at Wembley on 8 May 1971.

Arsenal won 2–1 after extra time, with all three goals being scored in the added half-hour. Steve Heighway opened the scoring for Liverpool with a low drive past Wilson on his near post. However, Arsenal equalised with a scrambled goal from George Graham which is often credited to substitute Eddie Kelly although TV footage exists which shows Graham got the final touch.

Charlie George then scored a winner late in extra time, when his long range effort went past Ray Clemence.

The game was the second half of Arsenal's first League and FA Cup double, the first double achieved by any club since Tottenham Hotspur's double in 1961. The first half had been achieved through Arsenal's league victory over Tottenham at White Hart Lane on the Monday of the same week. The trophy was presented by the President of The Football Association, Prince Edward, Duke of Kent.

Due to the clash of Liverpool's red strip with Arsenal's red and white colours, Arsenal wore their away strip of yellow shirt and blue shorts.

== Final ==
The game was played on a hot sunny day, and cramp and stamina were both to be of concern by the end of the match. Arsenal captain Frank McLintock won the toss, and he chose to play towards the southern end for the first half, meaning that Arsenal would have the low late afternoon sun at their backs in the second period.

Early play was dominated by Liverpool, who mounted several attacks on the Arsenal goal but found difficulty breaking through Arsenal's defence. As the half progressed play became for the most part evenly balanced, with Arsenal mounting more counterattacks on the break and Liverpool's best chances coming largely from free kicks deep in Arsenal's half of the field. The best opportunities to break the deadlock came late in the half, with Ray Clemence forced to make a reflex save of a header from George Armstrong in the 41st minute, followed in the 44th minute by a similarly fine diving save by Bob Wilson from Alec Lindsay, the result of a free kick. Earlier in the half, Ray Kennedy had caused several problems for the Liverpool defence, and a long range effort from Charlie George also narrowly failed to find the net.

Neither side had total dominance during the second period; Arsenal started strongly, with Liverpool coming more into the game as play progressed. Arsenal finished more strongly with a spell of concerted pressure in the latter stages of the half as the game opened up. The first few minutes of the second half consisted of the teams sizing each other up, with no clear chance coming until an opportunity for Arsenal in the 51st minute when Kennedy failed to get his foot to an effort from close range. Play was largely uneventful from then until the 56th minute, when Charlie George again shot wide from long distance. Liverpool's style of play largely consisted of slow, patient attacks, with their first major foray of the half coming in the 58th minute, ending when John Toshack failed to link up with Alun Evans. Eddie Kelly replaced a limping Peter Storey in the 64th minute. Three minutes later, Evans was replaced for tactical reasons for Liverpool by Peter Thompson. He was to have a part in a strong attack by Liverpool less than two minutes later, halted when the ball was cleared by McLintock. The game was briefly paused immediately after this attack, owing to Emlyn Hughes receiving treatment after being hit in the face by the ball. Liverpool were now having more of the possession, though the next clear chance, in the 74th minute, fell to Ray Kennedy when he received a John Radford cross within the goal area. The game opened up considerably from this point, and a George Graham header from a Radford long throw hit the crossbar in the 77th minute. The resulting corner led to a scrambled goal-line clearance by Lindsay. Steve Heighway mounted an instant counter-attack, but it came to nothing. In the next three minutes, Wilson was forced to make two saves in response to further attacks by Heighway and Thompson. A further solo effort by Brian Hall came five minutes before the end of the half, followed shortly afterwards by a shot from Kennedy at the other end.

=== Extra time ===
The first period of extra time began with Arsenal kicking off facing the same way as in the second half, with the low sun at their backs. Within a minute, a move which began with Larry Lloyd deep within Liverpool's half found Heighway in space on the left flank. He sent a low ball from the edge of the penalty area which went behind the advancing Wilson and into the Arsenal net. Two minutes later John Toshack almost made it two, with a sharp reflex save required from Wilson to prevent further damage to Arsenal's cause. Liverpool continued to dominate for the next ten minutes, but without any clear chances. This pressure left some holes in Liverpool's defence, however, and in the eleventh minute of extra time an overhead kick from John Radford into the Liverpool penalty area led to a scrambled attempt to clear the ball which saw the ball end up in the net. Eddie Kelly is often credited with the goal but tv footage exists that shows George Graham got the final touch. Clemence was forced to make a brave save two minutes from the end of the half after a centring cross almost found Kelly deep in the Liverpool area. The last chance of the half came from a strong shot from distance by Radford which went straight to Clemence.

By the start of the second period of extra time, the hot conditions and pace of the match were starting to take their toll, with several players (notably Brian Hall and George Graham) suffering from cramp. As such play was more broken, with fewer successful attacks, as crosses frequently failed to find their targets. Liverpool had the first clear chance after five minutes, when a cross from Thompson deep on the right flank narrowly failed to find Toshack. An immediate counterattack required Tommy Smith to tackle Kennedy deep in his own penalty area after Kennedy had received a long ball from Graham. The winning goal was to come moments later in the seventh minute of the period, when a ball from Radford found Charlie George just outside the Liverpool penalty area. His powerful strike beat Clemence to hit the top left of the Liverpool net. He followed this up with his famous celebration, lying on his back with arms outstretched until he was picked up by other members of his team. Liverpool were not to give up, however, and the first opportunity to reply came from Chris Lawler, who defied his cramping legs to attempt a flying kick at a pass from Toshack within the Arsenal area. This was one of the few remaining instances to really threaten in the dying minutes, however, although Radford produced a powerful long-range shot some two minutes before the final whistle.

The match was played with notable sportsmanship by both sides, reflected in the crowd's response throughout. When Liverpool's Lawler went down with cramp late in extra time, two Arsenal players assisted his recovery. Arsenal's victory, completing a double at the end of a 64-match season, was met with applause from both sets of supporters. Liverpool also received a positive reception from the crowd as they took a lap of honour, following the trophy and medal presentation.

== Match details ==
8 May 1971
15:00 BST

Arsenal	2–1 (a.e.t.)	Liverpool
Graham 101'; George 111'	Report	Heighway 92'

Wembley Stadium, London
Attendance: 100,000
Referee: Norman Burtenshaw (Great Yarmouth)

Arsenal	Liverpool

GK	1	(Scotland) Bob Wilson
RB	2	(Northern Ireland) Pat Rice
CB	5	(Scotland) Frank McLintock (c)
CB	6	(England) Peter Simpson
LB	3	(England) Bob McNab
RM	4	(England) Peter Storey	(substituted off) 64'
CM	11	(England) Charlie George
CM	8	(Scotland) George Graham
LM	7	(England) George Armstrong
CF	9	(England) John Radford
CF	10	(England) Ray Kennedy
Substitutes:
RM	12	(Scotland) Eddie Kelly	(substituted on) 64'
Manager:
(England) Bertie Mee

GK	1	(England) Ray Clemence
RB	2	(England) Chris Lawler
CB	4	(England) Tommy Smith (c)
CB	5	(England) Larry Lloyd
LB	3	(England) Alec Lindsay
RM	7	(England) Ian Callaghan
CM	11	(Scotland) Brian Hall
CM	6	(England) Emlyn Hughes
LM	9	(Republic of Ireland) Steve Heighway
CF	8	(England) Alun Evans	(substituted off) 68'
CF	10	(Wales) John Toshack
Substitutes:
LM	12	(England) Peter Thompson	(substituted on) 68'
Manager:
(Scotland) Bill Shankly

== Home media ==
Television coverage of the match has been released on DVD by the BBC as part of their FA Cup Final Classics series as part of a double-DVD set (BBCDVD 1681) along with Arsenal's win over Manchester United in the 1979 FA Cup Final. It was the last FA Cup Final to be commentated on by Kenneth Wolstenholme. The ITV coverage was also released on DVD in 2004, as one of a series of DVDs covering the 1970s Cup Finals, distributed by ILC Sport (DVD2508). The same company have also released DVDs of all the 1980s and 1990s Cup Finals.
