= John Webb (footballer) =

English footballer

Personal information
- Date of birth: 10 February 1952 (age 74)
- Place of birth: Liverpool, England
- Position: Full back

Senior career*
Years	Team	Apps	(Gls)
1969–1974	Liverpool	0	(0)
1973	→ Plymouth Argyle (loan)	4	(0)
1974–1975	Tranmere Rovers	20	(0)
1975	Bilzen		
1975–1977	Chicago Sting	54	(1)
1976–1980	MVV		
1980–1982	Edmonton Drillers	92	(2)
1980–1982	Edmonton Drillers (indoor)	32	(7)
1983–1986	Bilzerse VV		
Total		170	(3)
- * Club domestic league appearances and goals

John Webb (born 10 February 1952) is an English former professional footballer who played as a full back. Webb, who was active in England and North America, made over 150 career league appearances.

== Career ==
Born in Liverpool, Webb signed for hometown club Liverpool in February 1969. Webb was on the bench for five European appearances for Liverpool, but he never made a league appearance for the club, and spent a loan spell at Plymouth Argyle during the 1973–74 season. After leaving Liverpool in 1974, Webb moved to Tranmere Rovers, making 20 league appearances between 1974 and 1975. After a brief spell in Belgium with Bilzen, Webb then moved to the United States to play, and spent three seasons in the North American Soccer League with the Chicago Sting. Webb would return to the NASL in 1980, to play with the Edmonton Drillers. His two spells in the NASL were broken up by a spell in the Netherlands with MVV; after leaving the NASL following the culmination of the 1982 season, Webb returned to Belgium to play with Bilzerse VV.
