= Kit Fagan =

English footballer

Personal information
- Full name: Christopher James Fagan
- Date of birth: 5 June 1950 (age 76)
- Place of birth: Manchester, England
- Height: 6 ft 0 in (1.83 m)
- Position: Central defender

Senior career*
| Years | Team | Apps | (Gls) |
| 1970–1971 | Liverpool | 1 | (0) |
| 1971–1975 | Tranmere Rovers | 84 | (2) |
| 1974 | → Philadelphia Atoms (loan) | 4 | (0) |
- Bangor City
| Total | | 89 | (2) |
- * Club domestic league appearances and goals

Christopher James Fagan (born 5 June 1950) is an English retired footballer who played as a central defender in the Football League for Liverpool and Tranmere Rovers, and in the North American Soccer League for Philadelphia Atoms. He is the son of former Liverpool manager Joe Fagan.
