= Doug Livermore =

English footballer (born 1947)

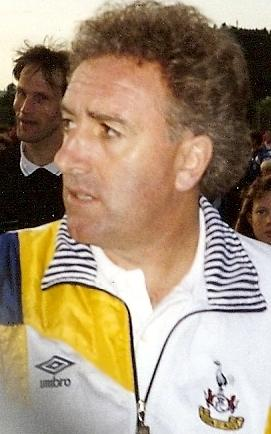
- Livermore in 1993

Personal information
- Full name: Douglas Ernest Livermore
- Date of birth: 27 December 1947 (age 78)
- Place of birth: Prescot, England
- Position: Midfielder

Youth career
- Bolton Wanderers

Senior career*
Years	Team	Apps	(Gls)
1965–1970	Liverpool	16	(0)
1970–1975	Norwich City	114	(4)
1975	→ AFC Bournemouth (loan)	10	(0)
1975–1977	Cardiff City	88	(5)
1977–1980	Chester	71	(6)
Total		299	(15)

Managerial career
- 1983: Swansea City (caretaker)
- 1987: Tottenham Hotspur (Joint caretaker)
- 1992–1993: Tottenham Hotspur (Joint caretaker)
- * Club domestic league appearances and goals

Douglas Ernest Livermore (born 27 December 1947) is a former professional football player and manager.

== Playing career ==
Livermore began his career with Liverpool where he came through the youth system to eventually sign professional forms on 1 November 1965 as an 18-year-old. He made his debut three years later when he appeared as a second-half substitute for Tony Hateley on 20 April 1968 in a 1–0 league defeat to West Ham United at Upton Park. Livermore was unable to replace his rival for the right sided midfield role, Ian Callaghan.

After 18 first team appearances for the Reds, Livermore moved to Norfolk club Norwich City on 26 November 1970. Doug had a fairly successful time at Carrow Road where he helped the club to win the 1971–72 Second Division championship, thus gaining promotion the top flight of English football. He was also part of the City side that lost 1–0 to Tottenham Hotspur in the 1973 League Cup final, the first time the Canaries had reached a Wembley showpiece final. During his spell at Norwich the creative midfielder played 139 times, scoring 6 goals, which would have been a higher figure but for the injuries he endured whilst at Carrow Road.

Livermore spent time at AFC Bournemouth on loan, making ten appearances, before he signed for Cardiff City in August 1975. Whilst at Ninian Park he played 88 times scoring 5 goals. Livermore then joined Chester in October 1977 and was a regular until the end of the 1978–79 season, appearing 71 times and scoring six goals. Livermore was a key part of the Chester side that finished fifth in Division Three (now League One) in 1977–78, their highest finish in the last 60 years.

Chester would prove to be the final port of call in his playing career, as he retired and took up his first position in coaching back at Ninian Park with Cardiff.

== Coaching and managerial career ==
After two years at Cardiff City, Livermore returned to another of his former clubs Norwich, where he became the Reserve team manager in 1980. Whilst at Norwich he also took a job on the coaching staff of Wales, a job where he had some success at as he helped to guide them to the 1980 Home International title.

In August 1981, he moved onto Swansea City to take up a similar role to the one he had just left. He had joined up with another former Liverpool player John Toshack. During his time at Swansea, he had a two-month spell as caretaker manager in 1983 when Toshack left the club.

He was also an assistant of Mike England with the Wales national football team during the 1980s.

He then moved onto Spurs where again he was Reserve team manager and also took the role of first team coach in July 1991, when manager Terry Venables became chief executive and first team coach Peter Shreeves became Team Manager.

1991–92 was a disappointing season for defending FA Cup winners Tottenham. Despite reaching the European Cup Winners' Cup quarter-finals and having striker Gary Lineker score 28 league goals in his final season for the club, their league form was dismal as they suffered 20 defeats and finished 15th in the First Division – below much less favoured teams including Wimbledon, Crystal Palace and Sheffield United.

Shreeves was axed, and Livermore was promoted to the role of Team Manager for the 1992–93 season – the first season of the Premier League. They finished eighth in the Premier League thanks largely to the efforts of 21-goal striker Teddy Sheringham as well as promising youngsters including Nick Barmby and Darren Anderton, but their hopes of silverware were ended by local rivals Arsenal, who beat them in the FA Cup semi-final and went on to win the trophy.

Chairman Alan Sugar dismissed Venables at the end of the 1992–93 season, and this also meant the end of the Livermore-Clemence managerial partnership, as Ossie Ardiles was appointed manager.

On 28 January 1994, Livermore made a football comeback as assistant to Roy Evans at Liverpool. He helped Evans guide Liverpool to League Cup glory in 1995 and to runners-up spot in the FA Cup in 1996, and remained at the club following the appointment of Gérard Houllier as joint manager alongside Evans for the 1998–99 season. But Evans did not enjoy his partnership with Houllier, and resigned in November 1998, with Livermore following him out of the Anfield exit door.

Livermore returned to football early in 1999 as joint assistant alongside Peter Shreeves at Premier League strugglers Nottingham Forest, where he worked under Ron Atkinson. The management team were unable to save Forest from relegation to Division One, and were axed in favour of former England captain David Platt for the 1999–2000 season.

Livermore then became assistant manager to Bruce Rioch at Norwich City, and was retained for the 2000–01 season, when Rioch resigned to make way for Bryan Hamilton. Hamilton quit in January to be succeeded by Nigel Worthington, and Livermore was part of the management team which secured Norwich's promotion to the Premier League as Division One champions in 2004. However, Norwich's Premier League comeback lasted just one season before they were relegated. Worthington was sacked in the autumn of 2006 after failing to get Norwich back into the Premier League, but Livermore remained at Carrow Road as assistant to new manager Peter Grant, until finally leaving on 9 February 2007 after nearly eight years on the club's coaching staff.

He then linked up with Nigel Worthington during the final weeks of the 2006–07 season as assistant to Worthington in his role as caretaker manager of Leicester City. The pair steered Leicester to survival in the Football League Championship but were not rewarded with long-term contracts and left the club.

== Honours ==
Norwich City

- Football League Cup runner-up: 1972–73

== Sources ==
- Mark Davage; John Eastwood; Kevin Platt (2001). Canary Citizens. Jarrold Publishing. ISBN 0-7117-2020-7.
