= Alan Waddle =

English footballer (born 1954)

Personal information
- Date of birth: 9 June 1954 (age 72)
- Place of birth: Wallsend, England
- Position: Striker

Youth career
- Wallsend Boys Club

Senior career*
Years	Team	Apps	(Gls)
1971–1973	Halifax Town	39	(4)
1973–1977	Liverpool	16	(1)
1977–1978	Leicester City	11	(1)
1978–1980	Swansea City	90	(34)
1980–1982	Newport County	27	(8)
1982	Gloucester City		
1982	Mansfield Town	14	(4)
1982–1983	Happy Valley		
1983	Hartlepool United	12	(2)
1983–1985	Peterborough United	36	(12)
1985	Hartlepool United	4	(0)
1985	Palloiluseura Apollo	10	(4)
1985–1986	Swansea City	40	(10)
1986	Barry Town		
1986	Al Wakrah		
1986–1987	Barry Town		
1987–1988	Llanelli		
1988–1989	Port Talbot Town		
1989	Maesteg Park		
1989	Bridgend Town		
1989–1993	Llanelli		
Total		300	(80)
- * Club domestic league appearances and goals

Alan Waddle (born 9 June 1954) is an English former footballer who played as a striker. Waddle began his career with Halifax Town, signing professional forms in October 1971. He made 22 League appearances and scored the crucial goal in the last match of the 1972–73 season at Walsall enabling Halifax Town to avoid relegation from the old Third Division. In June 1973 Waddle was signed by Liverpool manager Bill Shankly and netted his only goal for the Reds in a 1–0 win over rivals Everton in December 1973. Waddle made 22 appearances for the club but he lost his place in 1975, and only played one game in his remaining two years, although he did play in the home leg of the team's victory over FC Zürich in the 1977 European Cup semi-final, and made it onto the bench for the 1977 European Cup Final, before leaving that summer. He spent a year at Leicester City before moving on to Swansea City, where he had his most productive spell, working under manager John Toshack, the player he had understudied at Liverpool. In December 1980 Waddle joined Newport County for a fee of £80,000, a club record for Newport. He went on to have a much-travelled career, which included two returns to Swansea (one as commercial operations manager), and spells in Finland, Hong Kong and Qatar. He is a cousin of Chris Waddle, the former Newcastle United, Tottenham Hotspur and England midfielder.
