= John Smith (football chairman) =

Chairman of Liverpool F.C. from 1973 to 1990

Sir John Smith CBE DL

Chairman of Liverpool F.C.
- In office 1973–1990
- Preceded by: Eric Roberts
- Succeeded by: Noel White

Personal details
- Born: 6 November 1920
- Died: 31 January 1995 (aged 74) Gayton, Merseyside, England
- Spouse: Doris Parfitt (1944–1995; his death)
- Children: 1
- Profession: Businessman

Sir John Wilson Smith CBE DL (6 November 1920 – 31 January 1995) was the chairman of Liverpool F.C. from 1973 to 1990.

== Liverpool F.C. ==
John Smith was chairman of Liverpool Football Club for 17 years from 1973 and during this period they embarked on their most successful era. By the time he stepped down in 1990, the club had amassed eleven Football League championships, four European Cups, two UEFA Cups and three FA Cups. He first joined the Liverpool board in 1971 as a director and ran the club in tandem with longtime club secretary Peter Robinson. Smith was a stout defender of The Boot Room system of promoting managers from within the club, he appointed assistant manager Bob Paisley to succeed Bill Shankly in 1974 and followed this by appointing Paisley's assistant Joe Fagan to manager in 1983. The appointment of club centre forward Kenny Dalglish to player manager in 1985 broke away from the line of succession but heralded in another period of unbroken success. Dalglish had been signed as a player by Smith in 1977 and was described as "the best we ever had". Smith also played a pivotal role in the acceptance of shirt sponsorship in British football in the early 1980s. As well as overseeing Liverpool's glories of the 1970s and 1980s, he was also chairman at the time of the Heysel disaster in 1985, which led to 37 deaths, and the Hillsborough disaster in April 1989, which claimed the lives of 97 Liverpool fans at an FA Cup semi-final tie.

== Personal life ==
John married Doris Mabell Parfitt in 1946, to whom he had one son, Colin. He remained married to her until his death in 1995.

Smith was made a CBE in 1982 and knighted in the 1990 New Year Honours list "for services to sport".

== Quotations ==
- "We’re a very very modest club. We don’t talk. We don’t boast. But we’re very professional"
- "There is something they call, The Liverpool Way"
- "The ground was not good enough for an ordinary match, let alone a final."

== Honours ==
- Football League First Division: 1972–73, 1975–76, 1976–77, 1978–79, 1979–80, 1981–82, 1982–83, 1983–84, 1985–86, 1987–88, 1989–90
- FA Cup: 1974, 1986, 1989
- Football League Cup: 1981, 1982, 1983, 1984
- FA Charity Shield: 1974, 1976, 1977, 1979, 1980, 1982, 1986, 1988, 1989
- European Cup: 1977, 1978, 1981, 1984
- UEFA Cup: 1973, 1976
- European Super Cup: 1977
