= Peter Cormack =

Scottish footballer and manager (1946–2024)

Personal information
- Full name: Peter Barr Cormack
- Date of birth: 17 July 1946
- Place of birth: Edinburgh, Scotland
- Date of death: 10 October 2024 (aged 78)
- Position: Midfielder

Youth career
- Tynecastle Boys Club
- 1961–1962: Heart of Midlothian
- 1962–1963: Hibernian

Senior career*
Years	Team	Apps	(Gls)
1963–1970	Hibernian	182	(75)
1967	→ Toronto City (guest)	11	(5)
1970–1972	Nottingham Forest	74	(15)
1972–1976	Liverpool	125	(21)
1976–1980	Bristol City	67	(15)
1980	Hibernian	20	(1)
1983	Partick Thistle	1	(0)
Total		480	(132)

International career
1964–1968	Scotland U23	5	(2)
1966–1971	Scotland	9	(0)
1966–1970	Scottish League XI	6	(3)

Managerial career
- 1980–1984: Partick Thistle
- 1985–1986: Anorthosis FC
- 1986–1987: Botswana
- 2000: Cowdenbeath
- 2000–2002: Greenock Morton
- * Club domestic league appearances and goals

Peter Barr Cormack (17 July 1946 – 10 October 2024) was a Scottish professional football player and manager. His greatest success was with Liverpool in the early 1970s, for whom he played 178 times, winning two league championships, one FA Cup and two UEFA Cup medals.

Cormack also played for Hibernian, Toronto City, Nottingham Forest, Bristol City and Partick Thistle. He collected nine full caps for the Scotland national football team, and was a member of the Scotland squad at the 1974 FIFA World Cup that went undefeated but did not advance out of the group stage of the tournament.

Cormack managed Partick Thistle, Anorthosis FC, Botswana, Cowdenbeath and Greenock Morton. He held roles of assistant manager and interim manager at St Mirren and was assistant manager at Hibernian.

== Club career ==
=== Hibernian ===
A product of Tynecastle Boys Club the young Peter Cormack was signed by Heart of Midlothian directly from school. He was the first ground staff boy at Tynecastle Park since Hearts all-time great Tommy Walker in the 1930s. However Cormack left following an incident in which a grass cutting machine damaged a perimeter wall. Cormack was quickly signed by cross city rivals Hibernian who he joined in 1962. After impressing in the reserves he scored on his first team debut in November 1962 against Airdrieonians.

His best season at Hibs was 1964-65 during the 12 months they were managed by Jock Stein (Stein had a 62% win rate at Hibs). Hibs challenged for league and cup until Stein left before the end of the season to manage Celtic in March 1965. Cormack scored twice when Hibs won 4–2 against Rangers at Ibrox Park on 10 October 1964 in one of three victories against Rangers. The 4–2 win at Ibrox was three days after Cormack and Hibs had beaten Real Madrid 2–0 in a challenge match at Easter Road. Cormack scored the opener against Real volleying home a cross by Neil Martin. Stein was replaced by Bob Shankly with whom Hibs finished fourth in the league and lost in the Scottish Cup semi final to Dunfermline Athletic. Cormack played regularly with Hibs in Europe but was unable to progress past the quarter final stage. The most significant of Cormack's wins in Europe with Hibs was the November 1967 6-4 aggregate success against S.S.C. Napoli featuring Dino Zoff. Napoli won the first leg 4–1 in Italy. Cormack scored the third as Hibs won the second leg 5–0. Napoli were league leaders in Serie A at the time. Hibs had knocked out F.C. Porto in the previous round when Cormack scored a double in the 3–0 home leg win. They were eliminated 2–1 on aggregate in the quarter final by Don Revie's Leeds United.

Cormack scored 75 goals in 182 league games for Hibs in this spell. He was sold in 1970 when after a second sending off in a short period of time he was given a three-month suspension by the authorities in Scotland.

During the summer of 1967, the Hibs team played in the United Soccer Association, a North American competition, as "Toronto City".

=== Nottingham Forest ===
Aged 23, in March 1970 Cormack was signed by Matt Gillies at Nottingham Forest. Forest started the season well with Cormack being unbeaten and fourth in the league after six games. They were unable to retain this and slid down the table to finish in 16th. In his two seasons at the City Ground, he scored 15 times in 74 league games and 20 in 86 over all competitions. Ex Hibs teammate Neil Martin joined in 1971. However Forest were relegated from the top flight in 1972 from finishing second from bottom of the league.

=== Liverpool ===
Four days before his 26th birthday in July 1972, Cormack signed for Liverpool, managed by Bill Shankly. Shankly told Cormack he was 'the final piece in the jigsaw' of that Liverpool team and he became an integral part of the Liverpool midfield as the Anfield club won their first trophies of the 1970s with the League championship and the UEFA Cup.

Cormack made his Reds debut on 2 September 1972 in a league fixture at the Baseball Ground in a 2–1 defeat to Derby County. His first goal came on his home debut the following week, in a 4–2 win against Wolverhampton Wanderers at Anfield. He also received a booking in that game. In October he headed the only goal of the game with 13 minutes to go for a home win in the Merseyside derby against Everton. Two minutes into the second half of Liverpool's penultimate League match against Leeds United in April 1973, Cormack fired Liverpool's opener in a 2–0 win, a result that helped Liverpool to finish ahead of Leeds and Arsenal and win the title for the first time since 1966.

In the UEFA Cup, Cormack scored in the second round win against AEK Athens. Liverpool defeated four German teams en route to the trophy and beat Tottenham Hotspur in the semi-final. Cormack played both legs of the 3–2 aggregate win against Borussia Mönchengladbach in the final . His throw-in fed Chris Lawler to provide the high cross for the first goal. In total, Cormack played 52 games and scored 10 goals in his first season at Anfield.

Cormack won silverware in his second season, when Liverpool emphatically beat Newcastle United 3–0 at Wembley in the 1974 FA Cup Final. Cormack played in the final in central midfield with another Scottish-born player, Brian Hall. He played in all eight games in that FA Cup run and in all 42 league matches that season, two of those as a substitute, as Liverpool finished second to Leeds United in the league. Overall he played 57 games that season, scoring 11 times.

Cormack started his third season with the club by scoring a penalty in the penalty shoot-out win against Leeds in the 1974 FA Charity Shield. His next goal was in the 11–0 thumping of Norwegian minnows Strømsgodset in the European Cup Winners' Cup at Anfield, still a club record win. Liverpool again finished second in the league that season, this time to Dave Mackay's Derby County F.C. Cormack played 36 league games, scoring three goals.

In 1975–76, Cormack's fourth season at Anfield, Liverpool completed another League and the UEFA Cup double. Cormack played in both legs in the UEFA Cup first round 3–2 aggregate win against his former club, Hibernian. Cormack was a regular league starter until the end of October. In the next six leagues games he made the team sheet only once, as a substitute against Coventry City. He was then named as substitute against Burnley before a run of four games in the starting line-up, including a crucial 2–0 home win against Queens Park Rangers that put Liverpool in top spot ahead of the London club. The last of those four games was the 1–0 home league win against Manchester City on 27 December 1975. Cormack scored the only goal in what was to be a landmark game for him. A long-standing underlying problem with knee cartilage materialised into an injury after the game, when the cartilage cracked. He lost his place in the team and missed the rest of the season, which included the 4–3 aggregate win against Bruges in the UEFA Cup Final, and never played again in the Liverpool first team. He was an unused substitute in the 1976 FA Charity Shield win against Southampton at the start of the following season.

In his 125 Liverpool league games Cormack scored 21 times. He played 178 first team games in total, scoring 26 goals.

=== Bristol City ===
Aged 30, in November 1976 Cormack left Liverpool and joined Alan Dicks's Bristol City for £50,000. City were in their first season back in the top tier. City were in a three way dogfight to stay up. In City's penultimate game they played Liverpool, who already had the title wrapped up. Cormack was an unused substitute as his team won 2–1. Their final game opponents were Coventry City, who were also fighting to stay up. The kick-off had been delayed due to the large crowd, with some reports alleging it was intentionally delayed by Coventry's chairman, Jimmy Hill. Cormack joined the fray as a half-time substitute when his team were a goal down. Sunderland lost away to Everton, meaning a draw between to the two teams playing at Highfield Road would keep both those sides up and relegate Sunderland. News of Sunderland's defeat was displayed on the Highfield Road scoreboard. The score in the Coventry v Bristol City game was 2–2 at the time. Both teams then tamely played out a mutually beneficial draw.

Although not challenging for major honours, Cormack enjoyed yet another cup win this time in the Anglo-Scottish Cup in 1978. City played Alex Ferguson managed St Mirren in the two-legged final. The first leg was in Paisley with City beating their hosts 2–1 and Cormack scoring the winner. The 1–1 return leg draw gave City a 3–2 aggregate win.

He scored 15 goals in 67 league games in Bristol.

=== Hibernian (second spell) ===
Aged 33, in February 1980 Cormack returned to Hibernian where he lined up alongside George Best. However this was insufficient to prevent Hibs being relegated from Scotland's top flight at the end of that season. In total he played almost 300 games for Hibs over two spells. He scored once in 20 league games in this second Hibs spell. He stayed til December before moving into management elsewhere.

== International career ==
Whilst at Hibs, he won his first full cap for Scotland on 25 June 1966 in a prestigious friendly with Brazil at Hampden Park. Brazil were warming up in readiness to play in the 1966 World Cup which was to be held in England. On Cormack's debut the Scots held the reigning World Champions to a 1–1 draw. In total he collected nine full caps all when playing for Hibs and his next club, Nottingham Forest. When at Liverpool he was selected for Scotland's squad for the 1974 FIFA World Cup. Davie Hay was selected to play in preference to Cormack who didn't cross the touchline for any game time as the Scots returned home unbeaten after the group stage with a win and two draws. Cormack also represented the Scottish League XI six times.

== Coaching career ==
On 5 December 1980, he was appointed Partick Thistle manager, succeeding Bertie Auld who had gone in the opposite direction to manage Hibs. Thistle finished sixth in the top flight at the end of Cormack's first season there. However they were relegated the season after from finishing 9th of the 10 clubs in the division. They missed out on promotion the season after in finishing fourth. They reached the last eight that season of both cup competitions being eliminated by Celtic and Aberdeen. Thistle missed out on promotion again in the 1983/84 season after when they finished third. Cormack was there for three and a half years leaving at the end of the 1983–84 season. In the league he played for Thistle once in season 1983–84.

From 1984-86 he managed Anorthosis Famagusta in Cyprus. In 1986 he managed the Botswana national football team before he returned to Scotland as assistant manager to Alex Miller at St Mirren. However, on 15 November 1986 Miller was appointed manager of Hibs after which Cormack had two games in charge of Saints as interim manager. Cormack then followed Miller to Hibs as his assistant manager once again. The St Mirren team they left behind won that season's Scottish Cup.

In December 2000 he was appointed manager of Cowdenbeath in the Scottish fourth tier. Cowdenbeath were promoted at the end of the season. However Cormack was sacked after 10 days during which time his side never played a game.

In July 2001 he took over at Greenock Morton in Scotland's third tier. However he left the following March in a season in which the club were relegated when they finished bottom of the division.

== Style of play ==
Born in Edinburgh, Cormack was described on his profile on the Liverpool F.C. website as "a skilful player with an eye for goal" and "a classy player who loved to entertain".

The article as a Hibernian Hall of Fame inductee says of him:

"Once described as a skinny kid built like a greyhound, he was as hard as nails, his fiery competitive nature earning him several altercations with officialdom. According to a popular Hibs player of the time, Peter could do everything, pass, beat a man, tackle and head the ball. The versatile Cormack could also play anywhere, out wide, midfield, up front and even in goal as he once demonstrated when keeping a clean sheet for most of the match against St Mirren after goalkeeper Willie Wilson had gone off injured."

He offered a serious attacking threat from headers with an apparent natural ability to hang in the air. He had a prance like style of running, by running on the balls of his feet. Cormack worked hard to improve as a footballer and did extra training sessions three times a week with Peter Marinello and John Murphy at Hibs. With a background in cross country running, he was very fit using his stamina to tire out opponents to allow space for himself.

== Personal life and death ==
Cormack went into the karaoke business. Cormack retired from professional football after he left Morton in 2002. Following a number of years on the after-dinner speaking circuit, Cormack spent time playing in celebrity golf events, working in his garden and helping with his six grandchildren.

His son, also named Peter, played football in Scotland for various clubs.

Cormack died from complications of dementia on 10 October 2024, at the age of 78.

== Honours ==
Liverpool

- Football League First Division: 1972–73, 1975–76
- FA Cup: 1973–74
- FA Charity Shield: 1974, 1976
- UEFA Cup: 1972–73

Bristol City

- Anglo-Scottish Cup: 1977–78
