= Frankie Lane =

English footballer

Personal information
- Full name: Frank Lane
- Date of birth: 20 July 1948
- Place of birth: Wallasey, England
- Date of death: 19 May 2011 (aged 62)
- Place of death: Wirral, England
- Position: Goalkeeper

Youth career
- Stanley Arms

Senior career*
Years	Team	Apps	(Gls)
1968–1971	Tranmere Rovers	89	(0)
1971–1975	Liverpool	1	(0)
1975–1978	Notts County	5	(0)
1978–1980	Kettering Town	27	(0)
1980–1981	Bedford Town	30	(0)
- * Club domestic league appearances and goals

Frankie Lane (20 July 1948 – 19 May 2011) was an English footballer who played as a goalkeeper. He began his Football League career with Tranmere Rovers, before joining Liverpool, where he spent four years as reserve goalkeeper. He made only two appearances for the club – the first of which, against Derby County, was notable for an incident where he safely caught a cross, only to step back over his goal line – but did make it onto the bench for the 1973 UEFA Cup Final, before leaving to join Notts County in 1975. He was also second choice at Meadow Lane, understudying Eric McManus, before dropping into non-league football with Kettering Town in March 1978. Lane died in May 2011.
