= Bobby Graham (footballer) =

Scottish footballer (1944–2025)

Personal information
- Full name: Robert Graham
- Date of birth: 22 November 1944
- Place of birth: Motherwell, Scotland
- Date of death: 3 September 2025 (aged 80)
- Position: Forward

Youth career
- 1961–1964: Liverpool

Senior career*
Years	Team	Apps	(Gls)
1964–1972	Liverpool	101	(31)
1972–1973	Coventry City	19	(3)
1973	→ Tranmere Rovers (loan)	10	(3)
1973–1977	Motherwell	132	(37)
1977–1981	Hamilton Academical	118	(42)
Total		380	(116)
- * Club domestic league appearances and goals

Robert Graham (22 November 1944 – 3 September 2025) was a Scottish professional footballer. He played as a forward for Liverpool, Coventry City, Tranmere Rovers, Motherwell and Hamilton Academical.

== Early years and Liverpool ==
Born in Motherwell, North Lanarkshire, Scotland, in 1944, Graham played for Motherwell Bridge Works as an amateur before Bill Shankly signed him for Liverpool as 17-year-old in November 1961.

A forward, Graham scored on his full debut, a 6–1 victory over KR Reykjavik on 14 September 1964 in a European Cup preliminary round second leg tie at Anfield. He scored a hat-trick in his first league game against Aston Villa in a 5–1 win twelve days later, with Graham's goals coming in the 6th, 64th and 86th minutes.

Graham was at Liverpool at an unfortunate time as he found it difficult to dislodge the successful strike partnership of Ian St John and Roger Hunt in the first team. He missed out on the 1965 FA Cup final win and only made one appearance during the Reds run to the league title the following season, not enough to gain him a medal.

The 1969–70 season was the most successful for him in a red shirt, as he made 54 (ever-present) first-team appearances and scored 21 goals, including a goal in the Merseyside derby at Goodison Park, the same game that saw Everton's Sandy Brown score an infamous own goal. Shortly afterwards, Kevin Keegan joined from Scunthorpe United and John Toshack was signed from Cardiff City, and Graham lost his place again.

== Coventry City and Tranmere Rovers ==
In March 1972, he was allowed to leave Anfield and moved to Highfield Road and Coventry City where he linked up with former teammate St John once more, again he struggled to get 1st team recognition, even going out on loan to Tranmere Rovers, when St John was in charge, for 10 games. Graham ended his short association with the Sky Blues and returned to Scotland.

== Motherwell ==
Graham moved to his home town club Motherwell. Ian St John again signed him for the Fir Park club and by the end of his first season he had shown why 'The Saint' had shown such faith, he finished top scorer. A young Willie Pettigrew was added to the side the following season and the pair formed a lethal partnership that terrorised Scottish defences for four seasons. When Crawford Boyd was later interviewed for the Queen of the South website, Boyd listed Bobby Graham as the best player that he played against in his time at Queens.

== Hamilton Academical ==
After 132 games and 37 goals Graham joined Hamilton Academical in 1977 for a, then, record transfer fee of £15,000, he, again, made over 100 appearances scoring 42 times. He then left Hamilton and senior football when he ended his playing days at Shotts Bon Accord in the Scottish junior football scene.

== Death ==
Graham died in 2025 at the age of 80.
