= Ian Ross (footballer, born 1947) =

Scottish footballer and manager (1947–2019)

Personal information
- Date of birth: 26 January 1947
- Place of birth: Glasgow, Scotland
- Date of death: 9 February 2019 (aged 72)
- Position: Defender

Youth career
- Glasgow & District Schools
- Liverpool

Senior career*
Years	Team	Apps	(Gls)
1966–1972	Liverpool	48	(2)
1972–1976	Aston Villa	175	(3)
1976	→ Notts County (loan)	4	(1)
1976	→ Northampton Town (loan)	2	(0)
1976–1979	Peterborough United	112	(1)
1979–1982	Wolverhampton Wanderers	0	(0)
1982–1983	Hereford United	15	(0)
Total		356	(7)

Managerial career
- 1982: Wolverhampton Wanderers (caretaker)
- 1985–1987: Valur
- 1988–1990: KR Reykjavík
- 1992–1993: Huddersfield Town
- 1994: Keflavík
- 1996: Berwick Rangers
- * Club domestic league appearances and goals

Ian Ross (26 January 1947 – 9 February 2019) was a Scottish professional football player and manager. He spent his entire playing career in England, including spells with Liverpool, Aston Villa and Peterborough United. As a manager, he won two Icelandic championships with Valur in 1985 and 1987 and also managed in the English and Scottish leagues.

== Career ==
A utility player, Ross's debut was for Liverpool on 14 January 1967 at Sheffield Wednesday in the First Division. Although never establishing himself as a first team choice, Ross served Liverpool well, often being used to mark the stars of opposing teams. He then moved to Aston Villa for £60,000 in February 1972, where he captained the side that gained promotion to the top flight and also won the 1975 Football League Cup final.

After falling out of favour at Villa, he had spells on loan at Notts County and Northampton Town before joining Peterborough United in December 1976. Here, he amassed over 100 appearances during two and a half seasons, in which he also served the club in a coaching role.

He joined First Division Wolverhampton Wanderers in 1979 as a coach, following his former Peterborough manager John Barnwell. He remained a registered player but never played a first team game for the club. He stepped in as caretaker manager after Barnwell's eventual sacking in January 1982, taking charge of five games, losing all. Ross left the club soon after, joining Hereford United in a similar role, though here he did make 15 first team appearances during the 1982–83 season.

He moved to Iceland in 1984 to manage Valur who he led to the Icelandic championship in 1985 and 1987. On 30 September 1987, he signed a two-year contract with KR where he stayed until February 1991, when he took a job as an assistant manager to Huddersfield Town. He served as the manager of Huddersfield from 1992 to 1993 before returning to Iceland in November 1993 when he took over as manager of Keflavík. He unexpectectly resigned from Keflavík on 2 July 1994. He subsequently managed Berwick Rangers in 1996.

== Death ==
Ross died on 9 February 2019.

== Honours ==
Aston Villa

- Football League Third Division: 1971–72
- Football League Second Division promoted: 1974–75
- Football League Cup: 1974–75

Valur

- Úrvalsdeild: 1985, 1987
