= Alun Evans =

English footballer (born 1949)

Personal information
- Date of birth: 30 April 1949 (age 77)
- Place of birth: Kidderminster, England
- Position: Striker

Youth career
- 1964–1967: Wolverhampton Wanderers

Senior career*
Years	Team	Apps	(Gls)
1967–1968	Wolverhampton Wanderers	22	(4)
1967	→ Los Angeles Wolves (guest)		
1968–1972	Liverpool	79	(21)
1972–1975	Aston Villa	60	(11)
1975–1978	Walsall	87	(7)
1978–1982	South Melbourne	104	(36)
1983	Morwell Falcons	23	(4)
1984–1985	Sandringham City	28	(21)
Total		401	(130)

International career
1968–1969	England Under-23	4	(0)
- * Club domestic league appearances and goals

Alun William Evans (born 30 April 1949) is an English former footballer who made his name as a centre forward in the Liverpool side rebuilt by Bill Shankly at the start of the 1970s. He was born in Kidderminster, Worcestershire.

== Career ==
Evans began his professional career with Wolverhampton Wanderers, breaking into the first team in the 1967/68 season. He had already appeared for the club on their summer success in winning the United Soccer Association under the guise of the Los Angeles Wolves in Summer 1967.

He only had one full season in Wolves' first team as he swiftly joined Liverpool in September 1968 for £100,000, making him Britain's most expensive teenager. He had caught the eye of manager Bill Shankly after he outran and out-thought Liverpool captain Ron Yeats in a match in 1968. Although only 19, and despite Shankly's known desire to introduce new players gradually to the team, Evans was put straight into the side and stayed there until the end of the season.

He made his debut on 21 September 1968 in a league match against Leicester City at Anfield, scoring in a 4–0 win. Evans went on to feature in 33 league games, scoring seven goals as Liverpool finished runners-up to Leeds.

After an unimpressive 1969–70 campaign, he fared better the next season, scoring frequently in the opening games but suffered from injury and ill-luck which forced him out of the team, including facial scarring after being attacked with broken glass in a nightclub.

He returned to the fray near the end, and bagged a hat-trick during this season in a European Fairs Cup fourth round 1st leg tie at home to German giants Bayern Munich in a 3–0 win that ultimately saw them through 4–1 on aggregate. He also scored a magnificent equaliser against Merseyside rivals Everton as Liverpool came from behind to win their FA Cup semi-final at Old Trafford. However, Evans played disappointingly in the final and was substituted midway through the second half. Liverpool eventually lost 2–1 to Arsenal after extra time.

His Anfield career did not last much longer, as the signing of Kevin Keegan pushed him aside, and he managed only a handful of appearances in 1971–72. After 111 first team appearances, he departed for Second Division, newly promoted, Aston Villa for £72,000 on 20 June 1972; Evans could have joined the Villa Park club straight from school as he impressed during a trial in 1964, however, he had decided to sign for Midland rivals Wolves.

He remained at Villa Park for just two-and-a-half seasons, before being allowed to leave for fellow Midlanders Walsall for £30,000 on 14 December 1975, after 71 games and 17 goals. Ironically, 5 months after Evans departed, Villa gained the promotion back to the big time they yearned for, finishing runner-up to Manchester United by 3 points. Following two full seasons at Walsall, which included scoring a goal that knocked Leicester out of the F.A. Cup and won 'Goal of the Month' on Match of the Day, the striker ended his career abroad playing in both the US and Australia (with South Melbourne FC, Morwell Falcons and Sandringham City SC).

== Honours ==
Liverpool

- FA Cup runner-up: 1970–71

Aston Villa

- Football League Cup: 1974–75
