= Phil Boersma =

English footballer

Personal information
- Full name: Philip Boersma
- Date of birth: 24 September 1949 (age 77)
- Place of birth: Kirkby, England
- Height: 5 ft 10 in (1.78 m)
- Positions: Midfielder; striker

Senior career*
| Years | Team | Apps | (Gls) |
| 1968–1975 | Liverpool | 82 | (17) |
| 1970 | → Wrexham (loan) | 7 | (0) |
| 1975–1977 | Middlesbrough | 47 | (3) |
| 1977–1978 | Luton Town | 36 | (8) |
| 1978–1979 | Swansea City | 18 | (1) |
| Total | | 190 | (29) |
- * Club domestic league appearances and goals

Philip Boersma (born 24 September 1949) is an English former professional footballer, who played as a midfield/striker for Liverpool and Middlesbrough among others.

== Life and playing career ==
Boersma began his career with Liverpool, signing his first contract in September 1968. He made his debut in 1969 on 24 September, in a League Cup 3rd round fixture against Manchester City at Maine Road. Boersma came off the substitutes bench in the 67th minute but could not help turn things around, with the Reds eventually losing 3–2.

He went on loan to Wrexham for 7 games in March 1970 before returning to Liverpool, scoring his first goal on 4 April against Dinamo Bucharest at the 23 August Stadium. Boersma came off the bench to replace Alun Evans after 15 minutes, scoring in the 47th, the goal helped the Reds draw the European Fairs Cup 2nd round, 2nd leg tie 1–1. The Reds had already won the 1st leg at Anfield 3–0 making the aggregate score 4–1.

As a prominent figure during Liverpool's run to the 1973 UEFA Cup Final against Borussia Mönchengladbach, bagging 4 goals on the way, Boersma gained a medal. While a non-playing substitute during the first leg at Anfield, he did, however, see 13 minutes of action in the 2nd leg when he came on for Steve Heighway. The Reds also won the First Division title that season, with Boersma contributing 7 goals from 14 appearances, enough to earn him a medal.

In 1973/74 he featured in 22 of Liverpool's games scoring 4 times, including 5 appearances and 1 goal during the FA Cup run which took the Merseysiders to Wembley. He expected to be the substitute but was overlooked for Chris Lawler, a full-back.

Boersma did not take the news well and angrily left Anfield vowing he'd never wear the red of Liverpool again. Liverpool and Boersma managed to work things out. He started the following campaign in goalscoring form, scoring the Reds' goal in the Charity Shield win over Leeds United, a game that finished 1–1, with Liverpool winning 6–5 on penalties.

He then scored a brace against Chelsea at Stamford Bridge on the last day of August, followed a week later by a first half hat-trick against Tottenham Hotspur at Anfield. He scored in a League Cup win over Brentford and twice more in the record 11–0 win over Strømsgodset I.F in the European Cup. His 10th goal in this period came against Stoke City, although the goals then dried up and he didn't hit the target for the remainder of the season.

Always on the fringes of the first team, mainly due to the Keegan/Toshack partnership supported by Steve Heighway, and the emergence of youngster David Fairclough, Boersma failed to make an impact on the 1975/76 season for the Anfield club and Bob Paisley allowed him to leave Liverpool in December 1975.

He moved to Teesside, joining Middlesbrough for £72,000. He played generally as a midfielder, making his debut on 6 December '75 in a 0–0 draw at Ayresome Park with Manchester United. During his short 2-year spell at Boro he played 47 league games scoring 3 times. It was at Middlesbrough where Boersma struck up a friendship with Graeme Souness: this friendship would pay dividends for Boersma later in his career.

Boersma left Middlesbrough in the August 1977 and headed to Kenilworth Road and Luton Town, where he scored 8 goals in 36 league games.

He left Luton to join up with former club colleague John Toshack who was in charge of Welsh club Swansea City. It was during his time at Swansea that Boersma suffered a broken ankle in a game against Swindon Town.

== Coaching career ==
Since retiring, Boersma moved into physiotherapy and coaching. He was appointed first team coach and then Assistant Manager at Swansea City, at a time when the Welsh side was rising up the Divisions from the old Division Three (League One) to what is now the Premiership. After leaving Swansea in 1983, he spent time at Lincoln City as Assistant Manager, and also spent most of the 1986–87 season as first-team coach at Doncaster Rovers, even turning out for the club's reserve team in the Central League

He linked up with Souness again as physio at Rangers before taking on coaching roles under Souness at their former club Liverpool. They then moved on to Southampton, Blackburn Rovers and Newcastle United. He parted from Newcastle by mutual consent in 2005. In January 2008 Boersma had a brief spell with Welsh Premiership side Llangefni Town as assistant manager.

== Honours ==
Liverpool

- Football League First Division (Level 1): 1972–73
- Charity Shield: 1974
- UEFA Cup: 1972–73
