= Steve Arnold (footballer, born 1951) =

English footballer

Personal information
- Full name: Stephen Frank Arnold
- Date of birth: 5 January 1951 (age 75)
- Place of birth: Willesden, London, England
- Position: Midfielder

Youth career
- Crewe Alexandra

Senior career*
Years	Team	Apps	(Gls)
1969–1970	Crewe Alexandra	15	(0)
1970–1973	Liverpool	2	(0)
1972	→ Southport (loan)	16	(3)
1972	→ Torquay United (loan)	3	(1)
1973–1974	Rochdale	40	(1)
1974–1976	Weymouth		
1975–197?	→ Dorchester Town (loan)		
1978–1979	Connah's Quay Nomads		
- West Kirby
- * Club domestic league appearances and goals

Stephen Frank Arnold (born 5 January 1951) is an English former professional footballer who played in the Football League as a midfielder for Crewe Alexandra, Liverpool, Southport, Torquay United and Rochdale.

== Life and career ==
Arnold was born in Willesden, London. He began his football career as an apprentice at Crewe Alexandra, turning professional in January 1969 and making his league debut the same season. His talent was soon spotted by bigger teams and in September 1970, after only 15 league appearances, he became a forerunner to the many players to leave Crewe for the top flight when he joined Liverpool for a fee of £12,000. He failed to establish himself at Anfield, making only two league appearances. His only start was in the penultimate league match of the season, away to Manchester City, when Bill Shankly made ten changes to protect his first-choice players before the Fairs Cup semi-final against Leeds United just two days later, incurring a heavy fine from the Football League.

In January 1972 he was sent on loan to Southport, scoring 3 times in 16 league appearances, and in September of the following season he was loaned to Torquay United, making his debut in the goalless draw away to Bury on 2 September. He played twice more for the Gulls, scoring in his final appearance, a 2–1 defeat away to league newcomers Hereford United on 30 September. In June 1973, he left Anfield, moving to Rochdale where he was to end his league career after only one season of regular first-team football, making 40 league appearances and scoring once.

He went on to play non-league football for Weymouth, scoring 14 goals from 57 appearances, and on loan to Dorchester Town (13 appearances), before injury forced his retirement. He came out of retirement to play for Connah's Quay Nomads and West Kirby.
