= Brian Hall (footballer, born 1946) =

Scottish footballer (1946–2015)

Personal information
- Full name: Brian William Hall
- Date of birth: 22 November 1946
- Place of birth: Glasgow, Scotland
- Date of death: 16 July 2015 (aged 68)
- Place of death: Preston, England
- Position: Midfielder

Senior career*
Years	Team	Apps	(Gls)
1968–1976	Liverpool	153	(15)
1976–1977	Plymouth Argyle	43	(16)
1977–1980	Burnley	51	(3)
Total		247	(34)
- * Club domestic league appearances and goals

Brian William Hall (22 November 1946 – 16 July 2015) was a Scottish footballer who played as a midfielder. He won six trophies with Liverpool in the 1970s. Hall then played for Plymouth Argyle and Burnley.

== Background ==
Hall was born in Glasgow and raised in Lancashire. He had trials with each of Blackburn Rovers, Bolton Wanderers and Preston North End in his teens. He moved to study for a degree in mathematics at the University of Liverpool, choosing to study in the city because he was, 'a Beatles nut'.

== Club career ==
=== Liverpool ===
After his move to study in Liverpool a friend of his arranged a trial for Liverpool. He signed at Anfield as an amateur in 1965. Three years later he turned professional after completing his degree.

Hall made his debut in a 0-0 league draw with Stoke City at the Victoria Ground on 7 April 1969. After two further substitute appearances he broke into the first team in autumn of the 1970/71 season. He replaced the injured Ian Callaghan on the right wing. Shankly was sufficiently impressed to move Callaghan on his return into a central midfield role to accommodate them both. His first goal was in the semi-final of the FA Cup against Merseyside rivals Everton at Old Trafford on 27 March 1971 with a dramatic 75th minute volley to clinch a 2-1 comeback. Hall played in the 1971 FA Cup Final and was one of Liverpool's brighter performers on the day. Arsenal came back to win the game 2-1 after extra time.

Two years later, he was part of the team which won both the 1972–73 Football League and 1972–73 UEFA Cup. Hall started the home first leg of that 1973 UEFA Cup Final against Borussia Mönchengladbach, but the game was abandoned after 27 minutes due to a downpour. Shankly in watching those 27 minutes before the game was abandoned felt the German defence was suspect in the air. He changed his starting line up for the re-arranged game the following evening. Shankly brought in tall forward John Toshack to the starting line up instead demoting Hall to appearing only as an 83rd-minute substitute for Steve Heighway in a 3–0 win. Hall was unused from the substitutes bench in the 2–0 defeat in the away leg for a 3-2 aggregate win.

He scored Liverpool's opener in the 1973–74 FA Cup 3-1 semi final replay win against Leicester City. On 4 May 1974 he played in Liverpool's 3–0 defeat of Newcastle United to win the FA Cup. Described by Liverpool as one of Hall's best games, he lined up with Peter Cormack in an all-Scottish born central-midfield pairing. For the opening goal Tommy Smith sent in a cross from the right towards Hall on the edge of the box that Hall dived underneath. As goal scorer Kevin Keegan said in the post match interviews, "Brian sort of was going to flick it and I shouted, "leave it". Had he flicked it I couldn't have done anything about it. As it happened as it come through I had plenty of time to do what, really, pick my spot." Hall was also involved in the passing build up that led to Keegan's second and Liverpool's third goal.

Hall played in the subsequent 1974 FA Charity Shield penalty shoot out win against Leeds. Hall took a penalty in the shoot out and scored. On 17 September 1974 Hall was part of the Liverpool side which recorded their 11–0 record European result against Norwegian side Strømsgodset in a Cup Winners Cup First Round First Leg tie at Anfield, of the 10 outfield players who played in the match he was the only one not to get on the score sheet. Hall's greatest number of first team appearances was in season 1974/75 including 35 league appearances. However Liverpool finished second to Dave Mackay's Derby County in the league. Their defence of the FA Cup was unsuccessful with fourth round elimination by Ipswich Town.

By the halfway stage of the 1975/76 season his place in the first team had gone to Jimmy Case, a similar fate that befell Cormack who lost his place after injuring his knee in training. Hall played in nine games en route to the 1976 UEFA Cup Final. However he was an unused substitute in both legs of the final 4-3 aggregate defeat of Club Brugge. He left Liverpool in 1976. He had made 224 first team appearances before he left scoring 21 goals.

=== Plymouth Argyle ===
Aged 30 he dropped down a division to join Plymouth Argyle in the summer of 1976 for £35,000. They were relegated at the end of the season.

=== Burnley ===
In November 1977 he stepped up a division to join Burnley for £25,000. He initially toiled before establishing himself in season 1978–79. He then only played a handful of games as his side were relegated at the end of the 1979–80 season.

=== Northwich Victoria ===
He moved to Northwich Victoria in 1980 on a free transfer.

== Style of play ==
The profile of Hall on the Liverpool FC website says, "He was an industrious player who always gave his all for Liverpool. Hall was small in stature, but clever and a very efficient footballer. Bill Shankly liked those attributes. He became a vital part of the team Shankly rebuilt in the early 70s."

In his obituary in The Independent he is described, "Hall tended to be an unobtrusive performer not often given to spectacular interventions, although his adroitly hooked volley which beat Everton in an FA Cup semi-final at Old Trafford in 1971 was a glorious exception. His forte was foraging ceaselessly for the ball then passing it with the minimum of fuss to the nearest red shirt in time-honoured Liverpool fashion. He kept moves flowing and could invariably be relied on to support the man in possession, embodying the messianic Shankly's devotion to the creed of the collective." The same obituary further described him as, "skilful, wirily resilient... making light of a slight deficiency in pace by his ceaseless industry.

== After playing ==
He was voted number 75 in the poll, "100 Players Who Shook The Kop".

Hall worked as a teacher and for Preston Borough Council as its Chief Recreation Officer, before returning to Anfield in 1991 to take on the role of the Liverpool Football in the Community Officer. He retained this public-relations role under several different titles until he retired in 2011 suffering from leukaemia. Hall died in Preston on 16 July 2015. He was married with two daughters and one son.

== Statistics ==
Club Performance
Club	Season	League		FA Cup		League Cup		Europe		Others		Total
Club	Season	App	Goals	App	Goals	App	Goals	App	Goals	App	Goals	App	Goals
Liverpool	1975/76	13	2	1	0	2	0	9	0	0	0	25	2
Liverpool	1974/75	35	5	2	0	3	0	4	0	1	0	45	5
Liverpool	1973/74	22	4	8	2	1	0	3	1	0	0	34	7
Liverpool	1972/73	21	2	0	0	2	0	8	1	0	0	31	3
Liverpool	1971/72	26	1	1	0	2	1	3	0	1	0	33	2
Liverpool	1970/71	33	1	7	1	3	0	8	0	0	0	51	2
Liverpool	1969/70	1	0	0	0	0	0	0	0	0	0	1	0
Liverpool	1968/69	2	0	0	0	0	0	0	0	0	0	2	0
Total		153	15	19	3	13	1	35	2	2	0	222	21

== Honours ==
Liverpool

- Football League First Division: 1972–73, 1975–76
- FA Cup: 1973–74; runner-up: 1970–71
- FA Charity Shield: 1974
- UEFA Cup: 1972–73, 1975–76
