= Alec Lindsay =

English footballer (born 1948)

Personal information
- Full name: Alec Lindsay
- Date of birth: 27 February 1948 (age 78)
- Place of birth: Bury, England
- Position: Full back

Senior career*
Years	Team	Apps	(Gls)
1965–1969	Bury	127	(13)
1969–1977	Liverpool	168	(12)
1977–1978	Stoke City	20	(3)
1978	Oakland Stompers	28	(1)
1979	Toronto Blizzard	4	(0)
Total		347	(29)

International career
1974	England	4	(0)
- * Club domestic league appearances and goals

Alec Lindsay (born 27 February 1948) is an English former footballer who played in the Football League for Bury, Liverpool and Stoke City.

== Career ==
Born in Bury, Lancashire, England, Lindsay played 139 matches for Bury, helping the club gain promotion in 1967–68. Manager Bill Shankly signed him for Liverpool in March 1969 for £67,000. He made his debut against Irish side Dundalk in the European Fairs Cup, on 16 September 1969. Liverpool won by an emphatic 10–0 scoreline, a record win until Liverpool beat Norwegian side Strømsgodset I.F. 11–0 in the Cup Winners' Cup, on 17 September 1974.

After an initial settling in period in which Lindsay played seven times, he was the selected as first choice left back during the 1970–71 season, which included the 1971 FA Cup Final at Wembley. League champions and double hunting Arsenal lay in wait. After the allotted 90 minutes the scores were level 0–0; during extra time the Reds took the lead, the Gunners scored a scrappy equaliser and went on to win the game 2–1 thus completing the league and FA Cup double. Arsenal were victorious that day - Lindsay would be back for another go in 1974 - but first Liverpool won a double of their own in 1973, winning the League championship and UEFA Cup, against Borussia Mönchengladbach in the final. He played in the 1974 FA Cup Final against Newcastle United and despite him having a goal ruled out for offside, Lindsay got his winners medal as Liverpool beat the Magpies 3–0.

This was to be the peak of Lindsay's Liverpool career. Shankly, the man who brought Lindsay to Merseyside, decided to retire in the summer of 1974. Unfortunately, for Lindsay, new manager Bob Paisley selected Phil Neal as his regular left-back the following season and even after Neal then moved to his favoured right back role, Lindsay was still rarely selected with Paisley preferring Welshman Joey Jones. He had already played four times for the England team, but was not selected for England again after falling out of favour at Anfield.

Liverpool won two more League titles during the next three years but Lindsay did not play enough games on either occasion to collect a league title medal. He also missed out on the 1976 UEFA Cup success and the 1977 FA Cup final when Liverpool, in search of a "treble", lost narrowly to rivals Manchester United. However, he was named as one of the five substitutes for the European Cup final in Rome three days later, when Liverpool beat Borussia Mönchengladbach 3–1. He left Anfield in the summer of 1977 and joined Stoke City.

He made a good start to his Stoke career converting three penalties in his first five matches for the club under George Eastham. However, with the expectation at the Victoria Ground to gain an instant return to the First Division Eastham was sacked in early January 1978 with the club languishing in mid-table. New manager Alan Durban decided to play the younger Geoff Scott at left back and Lindsay was allowed to make a move to America.

In 1978, Lindsay moved to the Oakland Stompers of the North American Soccer League (NASL). Following the 1978 season, the Stompers moved to Edmonton, Alberta, Canada and Lindsay moved to the Toronto Blizzard, also of the NASL. He played four times for Toronto Blizzard in 1979 before hanging up his boots at the age of 31.

== International career ==
Alec was given his first cap, and subsequently all of his caps, by caretaker manager Joe Mercer on 22 May 1974, England were playing host, at Wembley, to a friendly with Argentina, he was in good company as fellow Reds Kevin Keegan and the England captain Emlyn Hughes were in the starting line-up, the game was played in front of 68,000 people and ended in a 2–2 draw.

== Post-retirement ==
Lindsay is placed at 85 in the 2006 poll 100 Players Who Shook The Kop. He is now retired and lives with his partner in Scotland. He remains an avid Liverpool supporter and was a contributor to the Hillsborough Family Support Group's (HFSG) "Project 96" in August 2009. After his retirement he became a publican.

== Career statistics ==
=== Club ===
Club	Season	League			FA Cup		League Cup		Europe		Other^{[A]}		Total	
Club	Season	Division	Apps	Goals	Apps	Goals	Apps	Goals	Apps	Goals	Apps	Goals	Apps	Goals
Bury	1964–65	Second Division	6	2	0	0	0	0	–		0	0	6	2
Bury	1965–66	Second Division	17	4	0	0	0	0	–		0	0	17	4
Bury	1966–67	Second Division	32	1	2	0	1	0	–		0	0	35	1
Bury	1967–68	Third Division	41	6	3	1	4	1	–		0	0	48	8
Bury	1968–69	Second Division	31	0	0	0	2	1	–		0	0	33	1
Bury	Total		127	13	5	1	7	2	0	0	0	0	139	16
Liverpool	1969–70	First Division	6	1	0	0	0	0	1	1	0	0	7	2
Liverpool	1970–71	First Division	21	0	4	0	2	0	8	1	0	0	35	1
Liverpool	1971–72	First Division	38	0	3	1	1	0	2	0	1	0	45	1
Liverpool	1972–73	First Division	37	4	4	0	7	0	11	1	0	0	59	5
Liverpool	1973–74	First Division	36	4	9	0	6	0	3	0	0	0	54	4
Liverpool	1974–75	First Division	25	3	2	0	4	0	4	1	1	0	36	4
Liverpool	1975–76	First Division	6	0	0	0	3	1	2	0	0	0	11	1
Liverpool	1976–77	First Division	1	0	0	0	0	0	0	0	0	0	1	0
Liverpool	Total		168	12	22	1	23	1	31	4	2	0	246	16
Stoke City	1977–78	Second Division	20	3	2	0	0	0	–		0	0	22	3
Oakland Stompers	1978	NASL	28	1	–		–		–		–		28	1
Toronto Blizzard	1979	NASL	4	0	–		–		–		–		4	0
Career Total			347	29	29	2	30	3	31	4	2	0	439	36

A. The "Other" column constitutes appearances and goals in the Charity Shield.

=== International ===
National team	Year	Apps	Goals
England	1974	4	0
Total		4	0

== Honours ==
Bury

- Football League Third Division runner-up: 1967–68

Liverpool

- Football League First Division: 1972–73, 1975–76
- FA Cup: 1973–74; runner-up: 1970–71
- FA Charity Shield: 1974, 1976
- UEFA Cup: 1972–73
