= John McLaughlin (footballer, born 1952) =

English footballer

Personal information
- Date of birth: 25 February 1952 (age 74)
- Place of birth: Liverpool, England
- Position: Midfielder

Youth career
- Liverpool

Senior career*
Years	Team	Apps	(Gls)
1970–1976	Liverpool	40	(3)
1975	→ Philadelphia Atoms (loan)	22	(7)
1976	→ Portsmouth (loan)	5	(0)
1976	→ Dallas Tornado (loan)	5	(0)
- South Liverpool
- Barrow
- Wrexham
1978	Macclesfield Town	2	(1)
Total		74+	(10+)
- * Club domestic league appearances and goals

John McLaughlin (born 25 February 1952) is an English former professional footballer who played as a midfielder. Active in England and the United States between 1970 and 1976, McLaughlin made 72 career League appearances, scoring 9 goals.

== Career ==
Born in Liverpool, McLaughlin played as a youth with hometown club Liverpool, before making his professional debut in 1970. He made a total of 40 appearances for Liverpool in the Football League between 1970 and 1976. McLaughlin made five appearances on loan at Portsmouth in 1976. McLaughlin also spent time in the North American Soccer League with the Philadelphia Atoms and the Dallas Tornado.

After a knee injury ended his professional career, McLaughlin later played non-League football for teams including South Liverpool, Barrow and Wrexham.
