= Chris Lawler =

English footballer (born 1943)

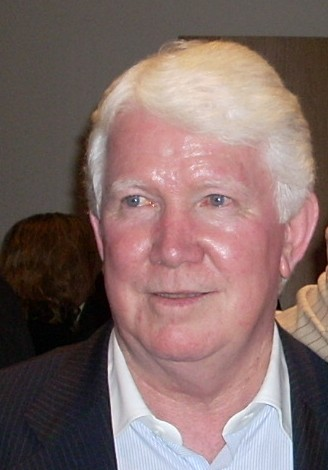
- Lawler in 2007

Personal information
- Full name: Christopher Lawler
- Date of birth: 20 October 1943 (age 83)
- Place of birth: Liverpool, England
- Position: Right-back

Senior career*
Years	Team	Apps	(Gls)
1960–1975	Liverpool	406	(41)
1975–1977	Portsmouth	36	(0)
1976	→ Miami Toros (loan)	21	(1)
1977–1978	Stockport County	36	(3)
1978	Bangor City	20	(1)
1980	Raufoss IL		
1981	IK Grand Bodø		
Total		519	(46)

International career
	England U23	2	(0)
1971	England	4	(1)
- * Club domestic league appearances and goals

Chris Lawler (born 20 October 1943) is a former footballer who enjoyed much of Liverpool's success of the mid-1960s to early 1970s.

== Life and playing career ==
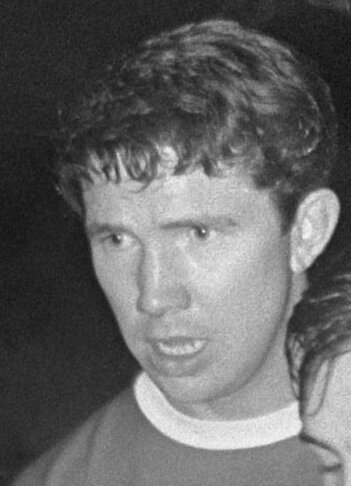
Lawler in 1966

A right-sided defender, Lawler joined his local club when he turned 17 in October 1960, and made his debut at the age of 19 in a 2–2 league draw with West Bromwich Albion at Anfield on 20 March 1963. For two seasons his progression into first team regular was gradual, playing just six matches in each of the seasons, but by 1965 he was the first choice right back. He scored the first of his many goals (for a right-back) during that season in a 5–1 defeat of Burnley at Turf Moor on 5 December 1964. Lawler's timing and anticipation, enabling him to turn up in the right place at the right time to score vital goals, earned him the nickname 'The Silent Knight'. The 1964–65 season culminated in him being selected in the team which beat Leeds United in the FA Cup final at Wembley, winning the trophy for the first time in the club's history.

Lawler missed just three games in the next seven seasons. During this period, he helped Liverpool win the League championship in 1966, ahead of Leeds by six points (in the old two points for a win system). This was followed by Liverpool being beaten 2–1 by Borussia Dortmund in the Cup Winners Cup at Hampden Park, Glasgow, in the Reds' first ever appearance in a major European final.

Lawler was an automatic starter on the team that finished second to Leeds for the 1968–69 league championship. He survived manager Bill Shankly's massive cull of 1970 which saw many of the older 1960s stars replaced by younger talent; this was perhaps due to Lawler being only 26 years-old at the time and hence younger than many who did get culled. Other than Lawler, only Emlyn Hughes, Ian Callaghan and Tommy Smith were retained.

Lawler again tasted defeat when he played in the 1971 FA Cup final loss to Arsenal. Liverpool won a League title and UEFA Cup double in 1973. Liverpool finished three points ahead of Arsenal in the league, while in the UEFA Cup final Liverpool defeated Borussia Mönchengladbach 3–2 on aggregate (won the first leg 3–0 at Anfield, lost the second leg 2–0 in West Germany).

It was during this period that Lawler won his four England caps. He scored on his debut, in the 5–0 defeat of Malta in a UEFA European Football Championship qualifier at Wembley on 12 May 1971.

He was on the bench, after a spell out injured, as Liverpool reached the FA Cup final again in 1974. As the 12th man, he received a winner's medal when Liverpool beat Newcastle United 3–0, but he did not see any action.

Bill Shankly's sudden departure from the club in the summer of 1974 marked the downturn of Lawler's Liverpool career, in addition to an injury suffered against Queens Park Rangers in 1973. New manager Bob Paisley purchased specialist right back Phil Neal from Northampton Town at the end of the year, and thereafter Lawler played only sporadically. He made his final Liverpool appearance against Hibernian in a UEFA Cup tie on 17 September 1975.

Lawler joined Portsmouth in October 1975, who were managed by former Liverpool teammate Ian St John. Lawler later joined Stockport County in 1978. He also played for Welsh League side Bangor City. In 1976, he played the summer on loan to the Miami Toros of the North American Soccer League. In 1980–81 Chris Lawler played and coached second-level club Raufoss I.L. in the Norwegian league system.

Lawler became a coach at Liverpool FC after his playing days were over until he was acrimoniously released from his duties in 1986. Lawler has kept a low profile since then, though has done some work for Liverpool, scouting for players.

Lawler was voted in at No.51 in the 100 Players Who Shook The Kop poll on the Liverpool FC Club website.

== Honours ==
Liverpool

- Football League First Division: 1963–64, 1965–66, 1972–73
- FA Cup: 1964–65, 1973–74; runner-up: 1970–71
- FA Charity Shield: 1964 (shared), 1965 (shared), 1966, 1974
- UEFA Cup: 1972–73
- European Cup Winners' Cup runner-up: 1965–66
