= 1960–61 Liverpool F.C. season =

English football club season

Liverpool
1960–61 season
- Manager: Bill Shankly
- Second Division: 3rd
- FA Cup: Fourth round
- League Cup: Third round
- Top goalscorer: League: Kevin Lewis (19); All: Kevin Lewis (22)
- Average home league attendance: 29,731
Home colours	Away colours

The 1960–61 season was the 69th season in Liverpool F.C.'s existence and their seventh season in Division Two. This was Bill Shankly's second season as manager and first full season at the club. The rebuilding of the club continued with them ending third in the table and being knocked out early in the FA Cup and the newly formed Football League Cup.

== Squad ==
=== Goalkeepers ===
- (England) Jim Furnell
- (Scotland) Bert Slater

=== Defenders ===
- (England) Gerry Byrne
- (England) Phil Ferns
- (Wales) Alan Jones
- (England) John Nicholson
- (England) John Molyneux
- (England) Ronnie Moran
- (England) Dick White

=== Midfielders ===
- (England) Alan A'Court
- (England) Ian Callaghan
- (England) Bobby Campbell
- (Scotland) Tommy Leishman
- (Scotland) James Harrower
- (England) Jimmy Melia
- (England) Gordon Milne
- (England) Johnny Morrissey
- (Scotland) Billy Liddell

=== Forwards ===
- (England) Alan Arnell
- (England) Alf Arrowsmith
- (England) Alan Banks
- (England) Willie Carlin
- (England) Roger Hunt
- (England) Dave Hickson
- (England) Kevin Lewis
- (England) Gordon Wallace
- (England) Johnny Wheeler

== Squad statistics ==
=== Appearances and goals ===
No.	Pos	Nat	Player	Total		Division 2		FA Cup		League Cup	
No.	Pos	Nat	Player	Apps	Goals	Apps	Goals	Apps	Goals	Apps	Goals
	MF	(England) ENG	Alan A'Court	37	7	33	7	2	0	2	0
	FW	(England) ENG	Alan Arnell	1	0	1	0	0	0	0	0
	FW	(England) ENG	Alan Banks	5	4	5	4	0	0	0	0
	DF	(England) ENG	Gerry Byrne	38	0	33	0	2	0	3	0
	MF	(England) ENG	Ian Callaghan	5	0	3	0	0	0	2	0
	MF	(England) ENG	Bobby Campbell	1	0	1	0	0	0	0	0
	MF	(Scotland) SCO	Jimmy Harrower	25	9	21	8	1	1	3	0
	FW	(England) ENG	Dave Hickson	38	17	33	16	2	0	3	1
	FW	(England) ENG	Roger Hunt	36	19	32	15	1	1	3	3
	MF	(Scotland) SCO	Tommy Leishman	45	5	40	4	2	0	3	1
	FW	(England) ENG	Kevin Lewis	36	22	32	19	2	1	2	2
	MF	(Scotland) SCO	Billy Liddell	1	0	1	0	0	0	0	0
	FW	(England) ENG	Jimmy Melia	27	3	26	3	1	0	0	0
	MF	(England) ENG	Gordon Milne	17	0	16	0	1	0	0	0
	DF	(England) ENG	John Molyneux	44	0	39	0	2	0	3	0
	DF	(England) ENG	Ronnie Moran	12	2	12	2	0	0	0	0
	MF	(England) ENG	Johnny Morrissey	24	5	23	5	1	0	0	0
	GK	(Scotland) SCO	Bert Slater	47	0	42	0	2	0	3	0
	FW	(England) ENG	Johnny Wheeler	31	3	27	3	1	0	3	0
	DF	(England) ENG	Dick White	47	0	42	0	2	0	3	0

== Table ==
Pos	Team	Pld	W	D	L	GF	GA	GAv	Pts	Qualification or relegation
1	Ipswich Town (C, P)	42	26	7	9	100	55	1.818	59	Promotion to the First Division
2	Sheffield United (P)	42	26	6	10	81	51	1.588	58	Promotion to the First Division
3	Liverpool	42	21	10	11	87	58	1.500	52	
4	Norwich City	42	20	9	13	70	53	1.321	49	
5	Middlesbrough	42	18	12	12	83	74	1.122	48	

Rules for classification: 1) Points; 2) Goal average; 3) Goals scored
(C) Champions; (P) Promoted

== Results ==
=== Second Division ===
Date	Opponents	Venue	Result	Scorers	Attendance	Report 1	Report 2
20-Aug-60	Leeds United	H	2–0	Lewis 28' Hickson 35'	43,041	Report	Report
24-Aug-60	Southampton	A	1–4	Leishman 11'	24,823	Report	Report
27-Aug-60	Middlesbrough	A	1–1	Lewis 81'	20,986	Report	Report
31-Aug-60	Southampton	H	0–1		37,604	Report	Report
03-Sep-60	Brighton & Hove Albion	H	2–0	Harrower 9', 35'	24,390	Report	Report
07-Sep-60	Luton Town	H	2–2	Hickson 6' Moran pen 12'	27,339	Report	Report
10-Sep-60	Ipswich Town	A	0–1		13,502	Report	Report
14-Sep-60	Luton Town	A	1–2	Moran 58'	10,055	Report	Report
17-Sep-60	Scunthorpe United	H	3–2	Harrower 38' Leishman 45' Hunt 72'	23,797	Report	Report
24-Sep-60	Leyton Orient	A	3–1	Hickson 25' A'Court 39' Morrissey 88'	10,921	Report	Report
01-Oct-60	Derby County	H	1–0	Wheeler 67'	24,695	Report	Report
08-Oct-60	Lincoln City	A	2–1	Hunt 56', 85'	7,699	Report	Report
15-Oct-60	Portsmouth	H	3–3	Hickson 18', 47' Hunt 79'	26,302	Report	Report
22-Oct-60	Huddersfield Town	A	4–2	Lewis 20' Hunt 25' A'Court 67' Hickson 89'	15,719	Report	Report
29-Oct-60	Sunderland	H	1–1	Harrower pen 52'	30,612	Report	Report
05-Nov-60	Plymouth Argyle	A	4–0	A'Court 23' Hickson 38' Hunt 52', 53'	17,641	Report	Report
12-Nov-60	Norwich City	H	2–1	Hunt 1' Harrower 56'	32,473	Report	Report
19-Nov-60	Charlton Athletic	A	3–1	Own goal 7' Hunt 77' Wheeler 86'	13,439	Report	Report
26-Nov-60	Sheffield United	H	4–2	Harrower 30', 63', 77' Hickson 55'	39,999	Report	Report
10-Dec-60	Swansea Town	H	4–0	Lewis 10', 58' A'Court 20' Hickson 62'	25,739	Report	Report
17-Dec-60	Leeds United	A	2–2	Lewis 63' Leishman 83'	11,900	Report	Report
26-Dec-60	Rotherham United	H	2–1	Hunt 21' Lewis 29'	39,426	Report	Report
27-Dec-60	Rotherham United	A	0–1		17,815	Report	Report
31-Dec-60	Middlesbrough	H	3–4	A'Court 21' Lewis 35', 56'	34,645	Report	Report
14-Jan-61	Brighton & Hove Albion	A	1–3	A'Court 84'	17,495	Report	Report
21-Jan-61	Ipswich Town	H	1–1	Lewis 73'	33,401	Report	Report
04-Feb-61	Scunthorpe United	A	3–2	Lewis 33' Melia 49' Leishman 86'	7,970	Report	Report
11-Feb-61	Leyton Orient	H	5–0	Hickson 5', 36', 80' Morrissey 23' Lewis 84'	22,131	Report	Report
18-Feb-61	Derby County	A	4–1	Hickson 1' Melia 30', 32' Lewis 48'	16,301	Report	Report
25-Feb-61	Lincoln City	H	2–0	Morrissey 10' Lewis 25'	24,759	Report	Report
04-Mar-61	Portsmouth	A	2–2	Banks 9' Morrissey 34'	14,301	Report	Report
11-Mar-61	Huddersfield Town	H	3–1	Banks 19', 52' Lewis 76'	29,733	Report	Report
18-Mar-61	Swansea Town	A	0–2		13,181	Report	Report
24-Mar-61	Plymouth Argyle	H	1–1	Banks 28'	25,250	Report	Report
31-Mar-61	Bristol Rovers	H	3–0	Hunt 9' Wheeler 63' Hickson 72'	36,538	Report	Report
01-Apr-61	Sheffield United	A	1–1	Morrissey 72'	28,853	Report	Report
04-Apr-61	Bristol Rovers	A	3–4	Lewis pen 30', 75', 89'	16,522	Report	Report
08-Apr-61	Charlton Athletic	H	2–1	Hunt 4', 65'	26,390	Report	Report
15-Apr-61	Norwich City	A	1–2	Hickson 67'	21,204	Report	Report
22-Apr-61	Stoke City	H	3–0	Hunt 7' Hickson 77' Lewis 87'	13,389	Report	Report
29-Apr-61	Sunderland	A	1–1	Hunt 59'	30,040	Report	Report
03-May-61	Stoke City	A	1–3	A'Court 6'	4,463	Report	Report

=== FA Cup ===
Date	Opponents	Venue	Result	Scorers	Attendance	Report 1	Report 2
07-Jan-61	Coventry City	H	3–2	Hunt 37' Lewis 40' Harrower 61'	50,909	Report	Report
28-Jan-61	Sunderland	H	0–2		46,185	Report	Report

=== Football League Cup ===
Date	Opponents	Venue	Result	Scorers	Attendance	Report 1	Report 2
19-Oct-60	Luton Town	H	1–1	Leishman 25'	10,502	Report	Report
24-Oct-60	Luton Town	A	5–2	Lewis 46', 51' Hickson 61' Hunt 73', 88'	6,125	Report	Report
16-Nov-60	Southampton	H	1–2	Hunt 54'	14,036	Report	Report
