= 1961–62 Liverpool F.C. season =

English football club season

Liverpool F.C.
1961–62 season
- Manager: Bill Shankly
- Second Division: Champions
- FA Cup: Fifth round
- Top goalscorer: League: Roger Hunt (41); All: Roger Hunt (42)
Home colours	Away colours

The 1961-62 season was the 70th season in Liverpool F.C.'s existence and their eighth and final season in Division Two. They finished the season as Second Division champions and sealed promotion to the First Division under the management of Bill Shankly, who had been in charge since December 1959. Their top scorer was centre-forward Roger Hunt, who scored 41 goals in the league and 42 in all competitions. They also reached the fifth round of the FA Cup.

The signings of Ron Yeats and Ian St. John in the close season would also be influential in their championship, and would become part of the team for the rest of the decade.

== Squad ==
=== Goalkeepers ===
- (England) Jim Furnell
- (Scotland) Bert Slater

=== Defenders ===
- (England) Gerry Byrne
- (England) Phil Ferns
- (Wales) Alan Jones
- (England) John Molyneux
- (England) Ronnie Moran
- (England) Dick White
- (Scotland) Ron Yeats

=== Midfielders ===
- (England) Alan A'Court
- (England) Ian Callaghan
- (Scotland) Tommy Leishman
- (England) Kevin Lewis
- (England) Jimmy Melia
- (England) Gordon Milne
- (England) Johnny Morrissey

=== Forwards ===
- (England) Gordon Wallace
- (England) Johnny Wheeler
- (England) Alf Arrowsmith
- (England) Willie Carlin
- (Scotland) Bobby Graham
- (England) Roger Hunt
- (Scotland) Ian St. John

== Squad statistics ==
=== Appearances and goals ===
No.	Pos	Nat	Player	Total		Division 2		FA Cup	
No.	Pos	Nat	Player	Apps	Goals	Apps	Goals	Apps	Goals
	MF	(England) ENG	Alan A'Court	47	10	42	9	5	1
	FW	(England) ENG	Alf Arrowsmith	1	0	1	0	0	0
	DF	(England) ENG	Gerry Byrne	47	1	42	1	5	0
	MF	(England) ENG	Ian Callaghan	28	1	23	1	5	0
	GK	(England) ENG	Jim Furnell	13	0	13	0	0	0
	FW	(England) ENG	Roger Hunt	46	42	41	41	5	1
	MF	(Scotland) SCO	Tommy Leishman	46	1	41	1	5	0
	FW	(England) ENG	Kevin Lewis	21	10	21	10	0	0
	FW	(England) ENG	Jimmy Melia	47	12	42	12	5	0
	MF	(England) ENG	Gordon Milne	47	2	42	2	5	0
	DF	(England) ENG	John Molyneux	4	0	3	0	1	0
	DF	(England) ENG	Ronnie Moran	19	1	16	1	3	0
	GK	(Scotland) SCO	Bert Slater	34	0	29	0	5	0
	FW	(Scotland) SCO	Ian St John	45	22	40	18	5	4
	FW	(England) ENG	Johnny Wheeler	1	0	1	0	0	0
	DF	(England) ENG	Dick White	25	0	24	0	1	0
	DF	(Scotland) SCO	Ron Yeats	41	0	41	0	0	0

== Second Division ==
=== Table ===
Pos	Team	Pld	W	D	L	GF	GA	GAv	Pts	Qualification or relegation
1	Liverpool (C, P)	42	27	8	7	99	43	2.302	62	Promotion to the First Division
2	Leyton Orient (P)	42	22	10	10	69	40	1.725	54	Promotion to the First Division
3	Sunderland	42	22	9	11	85	50	1.700	53	
4	Scunthorpe United	42	21	7	14	86	71	1.211	49	
5	Plymouth Argyle	42	19	8	15	75	75	1.000	46	

Rules for classification: 1) Points; 2) Goal average; 3) Goals scored
(C) Champions; (P) Promoted

=== Results ===
Date	Opponents	Venue	Result	Scorers	Attendance	Report 1	Report 2
19-Aug-61	Bristol Rovers	A	2-0	Lewis 7' Own goal 55'	19,438	Report	Report
23-Aug-61	Sunderland	H	3-0	Hunt 48', 83' Lewis 78'	48,900	Report	Report
26-Aug-61	Leeds United	H	5-0	Hunt 6', 48', 74' Lewis pen 53' Melia 68'	42,950	Report	Report
30-Aug-61	Sunderland	A	4-1	Hunt 26', 69' St. John 39', 90'	47,261	Report	Report
02-Sep-61	Norwich City	A	2-1	Hunt 63', 86'	28,049	Report	Report
09-Sep-61	Scunthorpe United	H	2-1	Own goal 12' A'Court 23'	46,837	Report	Report
16-Sep-61	Brighton & Hove Albion	A	0-0		18,764	Report	Report
20-Sep-61	Newcastle United	A	2-1	Milne 10' Own goal 43'	38,180	Report	Report
23-Sep-61	Bury	H	5-0	Melia 1', 46' St. John 7' Hunt 64' Lewis 70'	46,609	Report	Report
30-Sep-61	Charlton Athletic	A	4-0	Hunt 44', 78' Lewis 82' St. John 84'	14,236	Report	Report
04-Oct-61	Newcastle United	H	2-0	Lewis 38' Hunt 75'	52,419	Report	Report
07-Oct-61	Middlesbrough	A	0-2		23,780	Report	Report
14-Oct-61	Walsall	H	6-1	Lewis 41' Melia 47' Hunt 50', 57', 80' St. John 61'	42,229	Report	Report
21-Oct-61	Derby County	A	0-2		27,355	Report	Report
28-Oct-61	Leyton Orient	H	3-3	Hunt 34', 50' Leishman 79'	36,612	Report	Report
04-Nov-61	Preston North End	A	3-1	Milne 29' Callaghan 56' St. John 63'	29,243	Report	Report
11-Nov-61	Luton Town	H	1-1	Lewis 6'	34,924	Report	Report
18-Nov-61	Huddersfield Town	A	2-1	Melia 10' Hunt 27'	23,086	Report	Report
25-Nov-61	Swansea Town	H	5-0	Melia 47', 49' Hunt 60', 76', 82'	35,725	Report	Report
02-Dec-61	Southampton	A	0-2		21,445	Report	Report
09-Dec-61	Plymouth Argyle	H	2-1	A'Court 5' St. John 80'	32,543	Report	Report
16-Dec-61	Bristol Rovers	H	2-0	St. John 32' Hunt 79'	29,957	Report	Report
23-Dec-61	Leeds United	A	0-1		17,214	Report	Report
26-Dec-61	Rotherham United	A	0-1		13,577	Report	Report
13-Jan-62	Norwich City	H	5-4	Melia 25', 80' Hunt 42', 57' A'Court 60'	35,576	Report	Report
20-Jan-62	Scunthorpe United	A	1-1	St. John 4'	11,200	Report	Report
03-Feb-62	Brighton & Hove Albion	H	3-1	Byrne 52' Hunt 81' St. John 87'	36,414	Report	Report
10-Feb-62	Bury	A	3-0	Hunt 5', 36', 74'	21,872	Report	Report
24-Feb-62	Middlesbrough	H	5-1	St. John 14', 67' Hunt 39', 48', 90'	37,629	Report	Report
03-Mar-62	Walsall	A	1-1	A'Court 55'	13,660	Report	Report
10-Mar-62	Derby County	H	4-1	Hunt 34', 71' Melia 38', 47'	38,152	Report	Report
17-Mar-62	Leyton Orient	A	2-2	A'Court 80', 89'	25,880	Report	Report
24-Mar-62	Preston North End	H	4-1	Melia 9' St. John 14' Hunt 37', 67'	39,701	Report	Report
28-Mar-62	Rotherham United	H	4-1	Hunt 35' St. John 47', 55', 90'	32,827	Report	Report
31-Mar-62	Luton Town	A	0-1		9,086	Report	Report
07-Apr-62	Huddersfield Town	H	1-1	Hunt 68'	38,022	Report	Report
21-Apr-62	Southampton	H	2-0	Lewis 19', 29'	40,410	Report	Report
23-Apr-62	Stoke City	H	2-1	Moran pen 14' Melia 90'	41,005	Report	Report
24-Apr-62	Stoke City	A	0-0		15,472	Report	Report
28-Apr-62	Plymouth Argyle	A	3-2	A'Court 16' St. John 56' Hunt 60'	13,427	Report	Report
30-Apr-62	Charlton Athletic	H	2-1	Hunt 89' A'Court 90'	34,327	Report	Report
04-May-62	Swansea Town	A	2-4	St. John 31' Hunt 75'	15,000	Report	Report

== FA Cup ==
Date	Opponents	Venue	Result	Scorers	Attendance	Report 1	Report 2
06-Jan-62	Chelsea	H	4-3	St. John 16', 41' Hunt 28' A'Court 44'	48,455	Report	Report
27-Jan-62	Oldham Athletic	A	2-1	St. John 74', 80'	42,000	Report	Report
17-Feb-62	Preston North End	H	0-0		54,967	Report	Report
20-Feb-62	Preston North End	A	0-0		37,381	Report	Report
26-Feb-62	Preston North End	A	0-1		43,944	Report	Report
