= 1962–63 Liverpool F.C. season =

English football club season

Liverpool F.C.
1962–63 season
- Manager: Bill Shankly
- First Division: 8th
- FA Cup: Semi-finals
- Top goalscorer: Roger Hunt (24)
Home colours	Away colours

The 1962–63 season was the 71st season in Liverpool F.C.'s existence and their first season back in the Football League's First Division since 1953–54. Roger Hunt, who had scored 41 goals in the promotion winning league campaign, proved himself in the top flight and scored 24 goals, as Liverpool finished in 8th position in the league, and also reached the semi-finals of the FA Cup.

The Big Freeze of 1962–1963, was one of the coldest winters on record Football matches in the English leagues suffered because of the severe effects of the winter weather. Some matches in the FA Cup were rescheduled ten or more times. Matches in the fifth and sixth rounds, scheduled for 16 February and 9 March respectively, were played on 16 and 30 March. A board known as the Pools Panel was set up to adjudicate postponed matches to provide the football pool results. From 22 December to 13 February, Liverpool completed no league matches. The delays occurred before under-soil heating became widespread at major venues. When the thaw arrived, a backlog of fixtures had to be hastily determined. The Football League season was extended by four weeks from its original finishing date of 27 April. The final league fixtures took place one day before the rescheduled FA Cup final.

== Squad ==
=== Goalkeepers ===
- (Scotland) Tommy Lawrence
- (England) Jim Furnell

=== Defenders ===
- (England) Gerry Byrne
- (England) Phil Ferns
- (England) Alan Jones
- (England) Chris Lawler
- (England) Ronnie Moran
- (England) Tommy Smith
- (Scotland) Bobby Thomson
- (Scotland) Ron Yeats

=== Midfielders ===
- (England) Alan A'Court
- (England) Ian Callaghan
- (Scotland) Tommy Leishman
- (England) Kevin Lewis
- (England) Jimmy Melia
- (England) Gordon Milne
- (Scotland) Willie Stevenson
- (England) Gordon Wallace
- (England) Johnny Wheeler

=== Attackers ===
- (England) Alf Arrowsmith
- (Scotland) Bobby Graham
- (England) Roger Hunt
- (Scotland) Ian St John

== Squad statistics ==
=== Appearances and goals ===
No.	Pos	Nat	Player	Total		Division 1		FA Cup	
No.	Pos	Nat	Player	Apps	Goals	Apps	Goals	Apps	Goals
	MF	(England) ENG	Alan A'Court	23	2	23	2	0	0
	FW	(England) ENG	Alf Arrowsmith	3	0	3	0	0	0
	DF	(England) ENG	Gerry Byrne	44	0	38	0	6	0
	MF	(England) ENG	Ian Callaghan	43	2	37	2	6	0
	DF	(England) ENG	Phil Ferns	5	0	5	0	0	0
	GK	(England) ENG	Jim Furnell	13	0	13	0	0	0
	FW	(England) ENG	Roger Hunt	48	26	42	24	6	2
	DF	(Wales) WAL	Allan Jones	4	0	4	0	0	0
	DF	(England) ENG	Chris Lawler	7	0	6	0	1	0
	GK	(Scotland) SCO	Tommy Lawrence	35	0	29	0	6	0
	MF	(Scotland) SCO	Tommy Leishman	11	1	11	1	0	0
	FW	(England) ENG	Kevin Lewis	25	12	19	10	6	2
	FW	(England) ENG	Jimmy Melia	44	7	39	5	5	2
	MF	(England) ENG	Gordon Milne	47	0	41	0	6	0
	DF	(England) ENG	Ronnie Moran	40	7	34	5	6	2
	DF	(England) ENG	Tommy Smith	1	0	1	0	0	0
	FW	(Scotland) SCO	Ian St John	46	20	40	19	6	1
	MF	(Scotland) SCO	Willie Stevenson	34	2	28	2	6	0
	DF	(Scotland) SCO	Bobby Thomson	4	0	4	0	0	0
	MF	(Scotland) SCO	Gordon Wallace	7	1	7	1	0	0
	DF	(Scotland) SCO	Ron Yeats	44	0	38	0	6	0

== League table ==
Pos	Team	Pld	W	D	L	GF	GA	GAv	Pts	Qualification or relegation
6	Sheffield Wednesday	42	19	10	13	77	63	1.222	48	Qualification for the Inter-Cities Fairs Cup first round
7	Arsenal	42	18	10	14	86	77	1.117	46	Qualification for the Inter-Cities Fairs Cup first round
8	Liverpool	42	17	10	15	71	59	1.203	44	
9	Nottingham Forest	42	17	10	15	67	69	0.971	44	
10	Sheffield United	42	16	12	14	58	60	0.967	44	

Source: World Football
Rules for classification: 1) Points; 2) Goal average; 3) Goals scored

== Results ==
=== First Division ===
Date	Opponents	Venue	Result	Scorers	Attendance	Report 1	Report 2
18-Aug-62	Blackpool	H	1–2	Lewis 80'	51,207	Report	Report
22-Aug-62	Manchester City	A	2–2	Moran 21 pen' Hunt 79'	33,165	Report	Report
25-Aug-62	Blackburn Rovers	A	0–1		21,700	Report	Report
29-Aug-62	Manchester City	H	4–1	St. John 3' Hunt 55', 69' A'Court 65'	46,073	Report	Report
01-Sep-62	Nottingham Forest	H	2–0	Callaghan 10' St. John 72'	47,742	Report	Report
03-Sep-62	West Ham United	A	0–1		22,262	Report	Report
08-Sep-62	Sheffield United	A	1–3	Leishman 52'	24,126	Report	Report
12-Sep-62	West Ham United	H	2–1	St. John 39', 86'	39,261	Report	Report
15-Sep-62	Ipswich Town	H	1–1	Hunt 19'	40,121	Report	Report
22-Sep-62	Everton	A	2–2	Lewis 35' Hunt 90'	73,000	Report	Report
29-Sep-62	Wolverhampton Wanderers	A	2–3	Melia 39', 63'	34,368	Report	Report
06-Oct-62	Bolton Wanderers	H	1–0	Hunt 37'	41,155	Report	Report
13-Oct-62	Leicester City	A	0–3		24,137	Report	Report
27-Oct-62	West Bromwich Albion	A	0–1		17,850	Report	Report
03-Nov-62	Burnley	H	1–2	St. John 50'	43,870	Report	Report
10-Nov-62	Manchester United	A	3–3	St. John 51' Melia 85' Moran 89'	43,810	Report	Report
14-Nov-62	Arsenal	H	2–1	Hunt 52' Moran 55 pen'	38,452	Report	Report
17-Nov-62	Leyton Orient	H	5–0	Hunt 10', 25', 62' Stevenson 35' St. John 64'	30,009	Report	Report
24-Nov-62	Birmingham City	A	2–0	Hunt 62', 67'	27,050	Report	Report
01-Dec-62	Fulham	H	2–1	Hunt 51' A'Court 60'	38,267	Report	Report
08-Dec-62	Sheffield Wednesday	A	2–0	Lewis 31' Hunt 64'	15,939	Report	Report
15-Dec-62	Blackpool	A	2–1	St. John 25' Hunt 79'	16,271	Report	Report
22-Dec-62	Blackburn Rovers	H	3–1	Lewis 14' St. John 61'Moran 79'	35,371	Report	Report
13-Feb-63	Aston Villa	H	4–0	Hunt 18', 66' St. John 25', 29'	46,374	Report	Report
16-Feb-63	Wolverhampton Wanderers	H	4–1	Lewis 7', 52' St. John 47', 87'	53,517	Report	Report
02-Mar-63	Leicester City	H	0–2		54,842	Report	Report
05-Mar-63	Ipswich Town	A	2–2	Lewis 2' St. John 34'	14,059	Report	Report
09-Mar-63	Arsenal	A	2–2	Lewis 2' Hunt 19'	30,246	Report	Report
20-Mar-63	West Bromwich Albion	H	2–2	Hunt 77' Moran 85 pen'	43,977	Report	Report
23-Mar-63	Burnley	A	3–1	St. John 24' Hunt 75' Lewis 89'	28,500	Report	Report
08-Apr-63	Everton	H	0–0		56,060	Report	Report
12-Apr-63	Tottenham Hotspur	H	5–2	Stevenson 52' Melia 54', 89' St. John 72' Lewis 83'	54,463	Report	Report
13-Apr-63	Manchester United	H	1–0	St. John 72'	51,529	Report	Report
15-Apr-63	Tottenham Hotspur	A	2–7	Hunt 25', 70'	53,727	Report	Report
18-Apr-63	Nottingham Forest	H	0–2		36,599	Report	Report
20-Apr-63	Fulham	A	0–0		18,894	Report	Report
29-Apr-63	Sheffield Wednesday	H	0–2		29,144	Report	Report
02-May-63	Leyton Orient	A	1–2	St. John 35'	8,273	Report	Report
08-May-63	Birmingham City	H	5–1	Wallace 16' St. John 50' Callaghan 78' Hunt 80', 89'	23,684	Report	Report
11-May-63	Sheffield United	A	0–0		18,494	Report	Report
13-May-63	Bolton Wanderers	A	0–1		15,739	Report	Report
18-May-63	Aston Villa	A	0–2		18,000	Report	Report

=== FA Cup ===
Date	Opponents	Venue	Result	Scorers	Attendance	Report 1	Report 2
09-Jan-63	Wrexham	A	3–0	Hunt 18' Lewis 72' Melia 89'	29,992	Report	Report
26-Jan-63	Burnley	A	1–1	Lewis 25'	49,885	Report	Report
20-Feb-63	Burnley	H	2–1	St. John 45' Moran 119 pen'	57,906	Report	Report
16-Mar-63	Arsenal	A	2–1	Melia 33' Moran 65 pen'	55,245	Report	Report
30-Mar-63	West Ham United	H	1–0	Hunt 81'	49,036	Report	Report
27-Apr-63	Leicester City	N	0–1		65,000	Report	Report
