= 1963–64 Liverpool F.C. season =

English football club season

Liverpool F.C.
1963–64 season
- Manager: Bill Shankly
- First Division: Champions
- FA Cup: Quarter-finals
- Top goalscorer: League: Roger Hunt (31); All: Roger Hunt (33)
Home colours	Away colours

The 1963–64 season was the 72nd season in Liverpool F.C.'s existence and their second season back in the Football League's First Division. Liverpool won its first championship title since 1946-47, thanks to a spectacular performance in its only second season in the top flight. Manager Bill Shankly was hailed for the success, which meant the Scot had turned Liverpool from an average team in the Second Division to league champions in a little more than four years. Roger Hunt scored 31 league goals, while partner Ian St John managed 21 and Alf Arrowsmith 15, the trio being vital for the side that scored a club record 92 goals in the First Division.

== Squad ==
=== Goalkeepers ===
- (Scotland) Tommy Lawrence
- (England) Jim Furnell

=== Defenders ===
- (England) Gerry Byrne
- (England) Phil Ferns
- (England) Chris Lawler
- (England) Ronnie Moran
- (England) Tommy Smith
- (Scotland) Bobby Thomson
- (Scotland) Ron Yeats

=== Midfielders ===
- (England) Alan A'Court
- (England) Ian Callaghan
- (England) Kevin Lewis
- (England) Jimmy Melia
- (England) Gordon Milne
- (Scotland) Willie Stevenson
- (Scotland) Gordon Wallace
- (England) Johnny Wheeler
- (England) Peter Thompson

=== Attackers ===
- (England) Alf Arrowsmith
- (England) Phil Chisnall
- (Scotland) Bobby Graham
- (England) Roger Hunt
- (England) John Sealey
- (Scotland) Ian St John

== Squad statistics ==
=== Appearances and goals ===
No.	Pos	Nat	Player	Total		Division 1		FA Cup	
No.	Pos	Nat	Player	Apps	Goals	Apps	Goals	Apps	Goals
	FW	(England) ENG	Alf Arrowsmith	24	19	20	15	4	4
	DF	(England) ENG	Gerry Byrne	37	0	33	0	4	0
	MF	(England) ENG	Ian Callaghan	47	8	42	8	5	0
	DF	(England) ENG	Phil Ferns	19	0	18	0	1	0
	GK	(England) ENG	Jim Furnell	2	0	2	0	0	0
	FW	(England) ENG	Roger Hunt	46	33	41	31	5	2
	DF	(England) ENG	Chris Lawler	6	0	6	0	0	0
	GK	(Scotland) SCO	Tommy Lawrence	45	0	40	0	5	0
	FW	(England) ENG	Jimmy Melia	25	4	24	4	1	0
	MF	(England) ENG	Gordon Milne	47	3	42	3	5	0
	DF	(England) ENG	Ronnie Moran	39	1	35	1	4	0
	FW	(Scotland) SCO	Ian St John	45	22	40	21	5	1
	MF	(Scotland) SCO	Willie Stevenson	43	1	38	1	5	0
	MF	(England) ENG	Peter Thompson	47	8	42	6	5	2
	DF	(Scotland) SCO	Bobby Thomson	3	0	2	0	1	0
	MF	(Scotland) SCO	Gordon Wallace	1	0	1	0	0	0
	DF	(Scotland) SCO	Ron Yeats	41	1	36	1	5	0

== League table ==
Pos	Team	Pld	W	D	L	GF	GA	GAv	Pts	Qualification or relegation
1	Liverpool (C)	42	26	5	11	92	45	2.044	57	Qualification for the European Cup preliminary round
2	Manchester United	42	23	7	12	90	62	1.452	53	Qualification for the Inter-Cities Fairs Cup first round
3	Everton	42	21	10	11	84	64	1.313	52	Qualification for the Inter-Cities Fairs Cup first round
4	Tottenham Hotspur	42	22	7	13	97	81	1.198	51	
5	Chelsea	42	20	10	12	72	56	1.286	50	

Source: World Football
Rules for classification: 1) Points; 2) Goal average; 3) Goals scored
(C) Champions

== Results ==
=== First Division ===
Date	Opponents	Venue	Result	Scorers	Attendance	Report 1	Report 2
24-Aug-63	Blackburn Rovers	A	2–1	Moran 65' Callaghan 75'	34,390	Report	Report
28-Aug-63	Nottingham Forest	H	1–2	Own goal 54'	49,829	Report	Report
31-Aug-63	Blackpool	H	1–2	Melia 83'	42,767	Report	Report
03-Sep-63	Nottingham Forest	A	0–0		21,788	Report	Report
07-Sep-63	Chelsea	A	3–1	St. John 9', 90' Hunt 72'	38,202	Report	Report
09-Sep-63	Wolverhampton Wanderers	A	3–1	Hunt 1', 69' Melia 55'	25,000	Report	Report
14-Sep-63	West Ham United	H	1–2	Hunt 65'	45,497	Report	Report
16-Sep-63	Wolverhampton Wanderers	H	6–0	Arrowsmith 1' Thompson 33' Callaghan 57' Hunt 67', 87' Milne 79'	44,050	Report	Report
21-Sep-63	Sheffield United	A	0–3		24,932	Report	Report
28-Sep-63	Everton	H	2–1	Callaghan 43', 48'	51,973	Report	Report
05-Oct-63	Aston Villa	H	5–2	St. John 10' Callaghan 44' Thompson 44' Hunt 68', 77'	39,106	Report	Report
09-Oct-63	Sheffield Wednesday	H	3–1	St. John 45', 90' Melia 76'	46,107	Report	Report
19-Oct-63	West Bromwich Albion	H	1–0	Milne 32'	43,099	Report	Report
26-Oct-63	Ipswich Town	A	2–1	Melia 8' Hunt 44'	16,356	Report	Report
02-Nov-63	Leicester City	H	0–1		47,438	Report	Report
09-Nov-63	Bolton Wanderers	A	2–1	Hunt 25' Callaghan 65'	23,824	Report	Report
16-Nov-63	Fulham	H	2–0	St. John 86' Hunt 87'	38,478	Report	Report
23-Nov-63	Manchester United	A	1–0	Yeats 75'	54,654	Report	Report
30-Nov-63	Burnley	H	2–0	St. John 69' Hunt 86' (pen.)	42,968	Report	Report
07-Dec-63	Arsenal	A	1–1	Callaghan 60'	40,551	Report	Report
14-Dec-63	Blackburn Rovers	H	1–2	Hunt 74'	45,182	Report	Report
21-Dec-63	Blackpool	A	1–0	St. John 61'	13,254	Report	Report
26-Dec-63	Stoke City	H	6–1	St. John 9' Hunt 47', 49', 73', 81' Arrowsmith 53'	49,942	Report	Report
11-Jan-64	Chelsea	H	2–1	Hunt 69' Arrowsmith 85'	45,848	Report	Report
18-Jan-64	West Ham United	A	0–1		25,546	Report	Report
01-Feb-64	Sheffield United	H	6–1	Hunt 13', 42' Thompson 27' St. John 32', 55', 86'	43,309	Report	Report
08-Feb-64	Everton	A	1–3	St. John 80'	66,515	Report	Report
19-Feb-64	Aston Villa	A	2–2	Hunt 19' Arrowsmith 30'	13,729	Report	Report
22-Feb-64	Birmingham City	H	2–1	Moran 41' St. John 75'	41,823	Report	Report
04-Mar-64	Sheffield Wednesday	A	2–2	St. John 70' Stevenson 88'	23,703	Report	Report
07-Mar-64	Ipswich Town	H	6–0	St. John 41' Hunt 48', 72' Arrowsmith 55', 83' Thompson 70'	35,575	Report	Report
14-Mar-64	Fulham	A	0–1		14,022	Report	Report
20-Mar-64	Bolton Wanderers	H	2–0	Arrowsmith 28' St. John 43'	38,583	Report	Report
27-Mar-64	Tottenham Hotspur	A	3–1	Hunt 28', 67', 70'	56,952	Report	Report
28-Mar-64	Leicester City	A	2–0	Hunt 17' Arrowsmith 85'	31,209	Report	Report
30-Mar-64	Tottenham Hotspur	H	3–1	St. John 36', 38' Arrowsmith 53'	52,904	Report	Report
04-Apr-64	Manchester United	H	3–0	Callaghan 6' Arrowsmith 39', 52'	52,559	Report	Report
14-Apr-64	Burnley	A	3–0	Arrowsmith 20', 59' St. John 52'	34,900	Report	Report
18-Apr-64	Arsenal	H	5–0	St. John 7' Arrowsmith 38' Thompson 52', 57' Hunt 60'	48,623	Report	Report
22-Apr-64	Birmingham City	A	1–3	Hunt 78'	22,623	Report	Report
25-Apr-64	West Bromwich Albion	A	2–2	Hunt 29', 35'	19,279	Report	Report
29-Apr-64	Stoke City	A	1–3	Arrowsmith 64'	32,149	Report	Report

=== FA Cup ===
Date	Opponents	Venue	Result	Scorers	Attendance	Report 1	Report 2
04-Jan-64	Derby County	H	5–0	Arrowsmith 23', 38', 78', 88' Hunt 63'	46,460	Report	Report
25-Jan-64	Port Vale	H	0–0		52,327	Report	Report
27-Jan-64	Port Vale	A	2–1	Hunt 35' Thompson 118'	42,179	Report	Report
15-Feb-64	Arsenal	A	1–0	St. John 15'	61,295	Report	Report
29-Feb-64	Swansea Town	H	1–2	Thompson 63'	52,608	Report	Report
