= 1964–65 Liverpool F.C. season =

English football club season

Liverpool F.C.
1964–65 season
- Manager: Bill Shankly
- First Division: 7th
- European Cup: Semi-finals
- FA Cup: Winners
- FA Charity Shield: Title shared
- Top goalscorer: League: Roger Hunt (25); All: Roger Hunt (37)
| Home colours | Away colours |

The 1964–65 season was Liverpool Football Club's 73rd season in existence and their third consecutive season in the First Division. The club won its first FA Cup thanks to a 2–1 extra time victory against Leeds United in the final. The club's first final for 15 years saved a season in which Liverpool slipped from first to seventh in the league, and controversially collapsed at the hands of Inter in the European Cup semi-finals, in the club's first season in European competition.

Liverpool experimented with red shirts, shorts and socks during this season. The all red strip was used only in a number of European Cup and FA Cup matches, with League matches played in white shorts. The club permanently switched to a full red strip at the start of the 1965–66 season.

== Squad ==
=== Goalkeepers ===
- (Scotland) Tommy Lawrence
- (England) William Molyneux

=== Defenders ===
- (England) Gerry Byrne
- (England) Phil Ferns
- (England) Alan Hignett
- (England) Chris Lawler
- (England) Thomas Lowry
- (England) Ronnie Moran
- (England) Tommy Smith
- (Scotland) Bobby Thomson
- (Scotland) Ron Yeats

=== Midfielders ===
- (England) Alan A'Court
- (England) Ian Callaghan
- (England) Kevin Lewis
- (England) Jimmy Melia
- (England) Gordon Milne
- (England) John Sealey
- (Scotland) Willie Stevenson
- (Scotland) Gordon Wallace
- (England) Johnny Wheeler
- (England) Peter Thompson

=== Attackers ===
- (England) Alf Arrowsmith
- (England) Phil Chisnall
- (Scotland) Bobby Graham
- (England) Roger Hunt
- (England) John Sealey
- (Scotland) Ian St. John
- (England) Geoff Strong

== Squad statistics ==
=== Appearances and goals ===
| No. | Pos | Nat | Player | Total | | Division 1 | | FA Cup | | Charity Shield | | European Cup | |
| No. | Pos | Nat | Player | Apps | Goals | Apps | Goals | Apps | Goals | Apps | Goals | Apps | Goals |
|---|---|---|---|---|---|---|---|---|---|---|---|---|---|
| | MF | (England) ENG | Alan A'Court | 1 | 0 | 0+0 | 0 | 0+0 | 0 | 0+0 | 0 | 1+0 | 0 |
| | FW | (England) ENG | Alf Arrowsmith | 9 | 1 | 7+0 | 1 | 1+0 | 0 | 1+0 | 0 | 0+0 | 0 |
| | DF | (England) ENG | Gerry Byrne | 56 | 2 | 40+0 | 0 | 8+0 | 0 | 1+0 | 1 | 7+0 | 1 |
| | MF | (England) ENG | Ian Callaghan | 55 | 8 | 37+0 | 6 | 8+0 | 1 | 1+0 | 0 | 9+0 | 1 |
| | FW | (England) ENG | Phil Chisnall | 8 | 2 | 6+0 | 1 | 0+0 | 0 | 0+1 | 0 | 1+0 | 1 |
| | DF | (England) ENG | Phil Ferns | 4 | 1 | 4+0 | 1 | 0+0 | 0 | 0+0 | 0 | 0+0 | 0 |
| | FW | (Scotland) SCO | Bobby Graham | 15 | 5 | 14+0 | 4 | 0+0 | 0 | 0+0 | 0 | 1+0 | 1 |
| | DF | (England) ENG | Alan Hignett | 1 | 0 | 1+0 | 0 | 0+0 | 0 | 0+0 | 0 | 0+0 | 0 |
| | FW | (England) ENG | Roger Hunt | 58 | 37 | 40+0 | 25 | 8+0 | 5 | 1+0 | 0 | 9+0 | 7 |
| | DF | (England) ENG | Chris Lawler | 48 | 2 | 33+0 | 2 | 8+0 | 0 | 0+0 | 0 | 7+0 | 0 |
| | GK | (Scotland) SCO | Tommy Lawrence | 59 | 0 | 41+0 | 0 | 8+0 | 0 | 1+0 | 0 | 9+0 | 0 |
| | DF | (England) ENG | Tommy Lowry | 1 | 0 | 1+0 | 0 | 0+0 | 0 | 0+0 | 0 | 0+0 | 0 |
| | MF | (England) ENG | Gordon Milne | 48 | 6 | 34+0 | 5 | 6+0 | 1 | 1+0 | 0 | 7+0 | 0 |
| | GK | (England) ENG | Billy Molyneux | 1 | 0 | 1+0 | 0 | 0+0 | 0 | 0+0 | 0 | 0+0 | 0 |
| | DF | (England) ENG | Ronnie Moran | 18 | 0 | 13+0 | 0 | 0+0 | 0 | 1+0 | 0 | 4+0 | 0 |
| | MF | (England) ENG | John Sealey | 1 | 1 | 1+0 | 1 | 0+0 | 0 | 0+0 | 0 | 0+0 | 0 |
| | DF | (England) ENG | Tommy Smith | 40 | 4 | 25+0 | 4 | 8+0 | 0 | 0+0 | 0 | 7+0 | 0 |
| | FW | (Scotland) SCO | Ian St John | 43 | 11 | 27+0 | 4 | 8+0 | 2 | 0+0 | 0 | 8+0 | 5 |
| | MF | (Scotland) SCO | Willie Stevenson | 57 | 5 | 39+0 | 3 | 8+0 | 1 | 1+0 | 0 | 9+0 | 1 |
| | FW | (England) ENG | Geoff Strong | 16 | 3 | 13+0 | 3 | 1+0 | 0 | 0+0 | 0 | 2+0 | 0 |
| | MF | (England) ENG | Peter Thompson | 56 | 6 | 39+0 | 5 | 8+0 | 1 | 1+0 | 0 | 8+0 | 0 |
| | MF | (Scotland) SCO | Gordon Wallace | 13 | 5 | 11+0 | 2 | 0+0 | 0 | 1+0 | 1 | 1+0 | 2 |
| | DF | (Scotland) SCO | Ron Yeats | 53 | 1 | 35+0 | 0 | 8+0 | 0 | 1+0 | 0 | 9+0 | 1 |

== League table ==
| Pos | Team | Pld | W | D | L | GF | GA | GAv | Pts | Qualification or relegation |
|---|---|---|---|---|---|---|---|---|---|---|
| 5 | Nottingham Forest | 42 | 17 | 13 | 12 | 71 | 67 | 1.060 | 47 | |
| 6 | Tottenham Hotspur | 42 | 19 | 7 | 16 | 87 | 71 | 1.225 | 45 | |
| 7 | Liverpool | 42 | 17 | 10 | 15 | 67 | 73 | 0.918 | 44 | Qualification for the European Cup Winners' Cup first round (Note: Liverpool qualified for the European Cup Winners' Cup as the 1964–65 FA Cup winners.) |
| 8 | Sheffield Wednesday | 42 | 16 | 11 | 15 | 57 | 55 | 1.036 | 43 | |
| 9 | West Ham United | 42 | 19 | 4 | 19 | 82 | 71 | 1.155 | 42 | Qualification for the European Cup Winners' Cup first round (Note: West Ham United qualified for the European Cup Winners' Cup as the Cup Winners' Cup winners.) |

Source: World Football
Rules for classification: 1) Points; 2) Goal average; 3) Goals scored

== Results ==
=== First Division ===
| Date | Opponents | Venue | Result | Scorers | Attendance | Report 1 | Report 2 |
|---|---|---|---|---|---|---|---|
| 22-Aug-64 | Arsenal | H | 3–2 | Hunt 11' Wallace 49', 87' | 47,620 | Report | Report |
| 26-Aug-64 | Leeds United | A | 2–4 | Hunt 24' Milne 66' | 36,200 | Report | Report |
| 29-Aug-64 | Blackburn Rovers | A | 2–3 | Ferns 16' Smith 22' | 26,865 | Report | Report |
| 02-Sep-64 | Leeds United | H | 2–1 | Thompson 67' Smith 76' | 52,548 | Report | Report |
| 05-Sep-64 | Blackpool | H | 2–2 | Thompson 57' Hunt 79' | 45,646 | Report | Report |
| 09-Sep-64 | Leicester City | A | 0–2 | | 27,114 | Report | Report |
| 12-Sep-64 | Sheffield Wednesday | A | 0–1 | | 22,701 | Report | Report |
| 19-Sep-64 | Everton | H | 0–4 | | 52,619 | Report | Report |
| 26-Sep-64 | Aston Villa | H | 5–1 | Graham 6', 65', 86' Callaghan 36' Hunt 56' | 38,940 | Report | Report |
| 07-Oct-64 | Sheffield United | H | 3–1 | Hunt 31', 53' Graham 59' | 37,745 | Report | Report |
| 10-Oct-64 | Birmingham City | A | 0–0 | | 19,850 | Report | Report |
| 13-Oct-64 | Leicester City | H | 0–1 | | 42,558 | Report | Report |
| 17-Oct-64 | West Ham United | H | 2–2 | St. John 7' Hunt 27' | 36,029 | Report | Report |
| 24-Oct-64 | West Bromwich Albion | A | 0–3 | | 17,500 | Report | Report |
| 31-Oct-64 | Manchester United | H | 0–2 | | 52,402 | Report | Report |
| 07-Nov-64 | Fulham | A | 1–1 | Callaghan 78' | 18,367 | Report | Report |
| 14-Nov-64 | Nottingham Forest | H | 2–0 | Thompson 22' Hunt 68' | 40,498 | Report | Report |
| 21-Nov-64 | Stoke City | A | 1–1 | Hunt 41' | 28,816 | Report | Report |
| 28-Nov-64 | Tottenham Hotspur | H | 1–1 | Hunt 41' | 41,198 | Report | Report |
| 05-Dec-64 | Burnley | A | 5–1 | Hunt 33', 77', 85' Strong 73' Lawler 89' | 12,490 | Report | Report |
| 12-Dec-64 | Arsenal | A | 0–0 | | 26,171 | Report | Report |
| 19-Dec-64 | Blackburn Rovers | H | 3–2 | Smith 37' Hunt 38', 81' | 33,316 | Report | Report |
| 26-Dec-64 | Sunderland | A | 3–2 | Milne 5' Stevenson 30', 82' | 49,902 | Report | Report |
| 28-Dec-64 | Sunderland | H | 0–0 | | 43,521 | Report | Report |
| 02-Jan-65 | Blackpool | A | 3–2 | Hunt 53', 58' St. John 75' | 21,863 | Report | Report |
| 16-Jan-65 | Sheffield Wednesday | H | 4–2 | Hunt 40', 64' Milne 70' St. John 75' | 42,422 | Report | Report |
| 06-Feb-65 | Aston Villa | A | 1–0 | Hunt 15' | 24,396 | Report | Report |
| 13-Feb-65 | Wolverhampton Wanderers | H | 2–1 | Hunt 49' Lawler 61' | 40,803 | Report | Report |
| 24-Feb-65 | Birmingham City | H | 4–3 | Callaghan 19', 87' Hunt 56' Thompson 77' | 39,253 | Report | Report |
| 27-Feb-65 | West Ham United | A | 1–2 | Hunt 21' | 25,780 | Report | Report |
| 13-Mar-65 | Sheffield United | A | 0–3 | | 19,034 | Report | Report |
| 20-Mar-65 | Fulham | H | 3–2 | Callaghan 45', 48' Milne 89' | 28,323 | Report | Report |
| 01-Apr-65 | Nottingham Forest | A | 2–2 | Thompson 35' Hunt 55' | 23,926 | Report | Report |
| 03-Apr-65 | Stoke City | H | 3–2 | Milne 47' St. John 55' Hunt 77' | 40,315 | Report | Report |
| 06-Apr-65 | West Bromwich Albion | H | 0–3 | | 34,152 | Report | Report |
| 09-Apr-65 | Tottenham Hotspur | A | 0–3 | | 27,057 | Report | Report |
| 12-Apr-65 | Everton | A | 1–2 | Stevenson 75' (pen.) | 62,720 | Report | Report |
| 16-Apr-65 | Chelsea | A | 0–4 | | 62,587 | Report | Report |
| 17-Apr-65 | Burnley | H | 1–1 | Smith 52' | 30,004 | Report | Report |
| 19-Apr-65 | Chelsea | H | 2–0 | Chisnall 9' Strong 26' | 41,847 | Report | Report |
| 24-Apr-65 | Manchester United | A | 0–3 | | 55,772 | Report | Report |
| 26-Apr-65 | Wolverhampton Wanderers | H | 3–1 | Strong 13' Sealey 35' Arrowsmith 69' | 13,839 | Report | Report |

=== FA Charity Shield ===
15 August 1964
15:00 BST

| Liverpool | 2–2 | West Ham United |
|---|---|---|
| Wallace 28'; Byrne 49' | Report; Report | Byrne 41'; Hurst 84' |

Anfield, Liverpool
Attendance: 38,858
Referee: K. Stokes

| GK | 1 | (Scotland) Tommy Lawrence |
| RB | 2 | (England) Gerry Byrne |
| LB | 3 | (England) Ronnie Moran |
| RH | 4 | (England) Gordon Milne |
| CH | 5 | (Scotland) Ron Yeats (c) |
| LH | 6 | (Scotland) Willie Stevenson |
| OR | 7 | (England) Ian Callaghan |
| IR | 8 | (England) Roger Hunt |
| CF | 9 | (England) Alf Arrowsmith (substituted off) 15' |
| IL | 10 | (England) Gordon Wallace |
| OL | 11 | (England) Peter Thompson |
Substitute:
| FW | 12 | (England) Phil Chisnall (substituted on) 15' |
Manager:
(Scotland) Bill Shankly

| GK | 1 | (England) Jim Standen |
| RB | 2 | (England) John Bond |
| LB | 3 | (England) Jack Burkett |
| RH | 4 | (England) Eddie Bovington |
| CH | 5 | (England) Kenneth Brown |
| LH | 6 | (England) Bobby Moore |
| OR | 7 | (England) Peter Brabrook |
| IR | 8 | (England) Ronnie Boyce |
| CF | 9 | (England) Johnny Byrne |
| IL | 10 | (England) Geoff Hurst |
| OL | 11 | (England) John Sissons |
Substitutes:
| FW | 12 | (England) ? |
Manager:
(England) Ron Greenwood

Match rules

- 90 minutes, no extra time
- One named substitute
- Maximum of one substitution

=== FA Cup ===
| Date | Opponents | Venue | Result | Scorers | Attendance | Report 1 | Report 2 |
|---|---|---|---|---|---|---|---|
| 09-Jan-65 | West Bromwich Albion | A | 2–1 | Hunt 44' St. John 63' | 29,851 | Report | Report |
| 30-Jan-65 | Stockport County | H | 1–1 | Milne 51' | 51,851 | Report | Report |
| 03-Feb-65 | Stockport County | A | 2–0 | Hunt 39', 85' | 24,080 | Report | Report |
| 20-Feb-65 | Bolton Wanderers | A | 1–0 | Callaghan 85' | 57,207 | Report | Report |
| 06-Mar-65 | Leicester City | A | 0–0 | | 39,356 | Report | Report |
| 10-Mar-65 | Leicester City | H | 1–0 | Hunt 72' | 53,324 | Report | Report |
| 27-Mar-65 | Chelsea | N | 2–0 | Thompson 63' Stevenson 79' (pen.) | 67,686 | Report | Report |

Final

1 May 1965
15:00 BST

| Liverpool | 2–1 (Extra time) | Leeds United |
|---|---|---|
| Hunt 93'; St. John 113' | (Report) (Report) (Report) | Bremner 100' |

Wembley, London
Attendance: 100,000
Referee: W. Clements (Birmingham)

| Liverpool | Leeds United |

| GK | 1 | (Scotland) Tommy Lawrence |
| DF | 2 | (England) Chris Lawler |
| DF | 3 | (England) Gerry Byrne |
| DF | 4 | (England) Geoff Strong |
| DF | 5 | (Scotland) Ron Yeats (c) |
| MF | 6 | (Scotland) Willie Stevenson |
| MF | 7 | (England) Ian Callaghan |
| FW | 8 | (England) Roger Hunt |
| FW | 9 | (Scotland) Ian St. John |
| MF | 10 | (England) Tommy Smith |
| MF | 11 | (England) Peter Thompson |
Manager:
(Scotland) Bill Shankly

| GK | 1 | (Wales) Gary Sprake |
| DF | 2 | (England) Paul Reaney |
| DF | 3 | (Scotland) Willie Bell |
| MF | 4 | (Scotland) Billy Bremner |
| DF | 5 | (England) Jack Charlton |
| DF | 6 | (England) Norman Hunter |
| MF | 7 | (Republic of Ireland) Johnny Giles |
| FW | 8 | (Scotland) Jim Storrie |
| FW | 9 | (England) Alan Peacock |
| MF | 10 | (Scotland) Bobby Collins (c) |
| MF | 11 | (South Africa) Albert Johanneson |
Manager:
(England) Don Revie

Match rules

- 90 minutes.
- 30 minutes of extra-time if necessary.
- Replay if scores still level.

=== European Cup ===
| Date | Opponents | Venue | Result | Scorers | Attendance | Report 1 | Report 2 |
|---|---|---|---|---|---|---|---|
| 17-Aug-64 | KR Reykjavík | A | 5–0 | Wallace 3', 60' Hunt 46', 88' Chisnall 57' | 10,268 | Report | Report |
| 14-Sep-64 | KR Reykjavík | H | 6–1 | Byrne 13' St. John 23', 74' Hunt 50' Graham 65' Stevenson 67' | 32,597 | Report | Report |
| 25-Nov-64 | Anderlecht | H | 3–0 | St. John 10' Hunt 43' Yeats 50' | 44,516 | Report | Report |
| 16-Dec-64 | Anderlecht | A | 1–0 | Hunt 90' | 60,000 | Report | Report |
| 10-Feb-65 | 1. FC Köln | A | 0–0 | | 40,000 | Report | Report |
| 17-Mar-65 | 1. FC Köln | H | 0–0 | | 48,432 | Report | Report |
| 24-Mar-65 | 1. FC Köln | N | 2–2 | St. John 22' Hunt 37' | 45,000 | Report | Report |
| 04-May-65 | Inter Milan | H | 3–1 | Hunt 4' Callaghan 34' St. John 75' | 54,082 | Report | Report |
| 12-May-65 | Inter Milan | A | 0–3 | | 90,000 | Report | Report |
