= Ian Callaghan =

English footballer (born 1942)

Ian Callaghan MBE
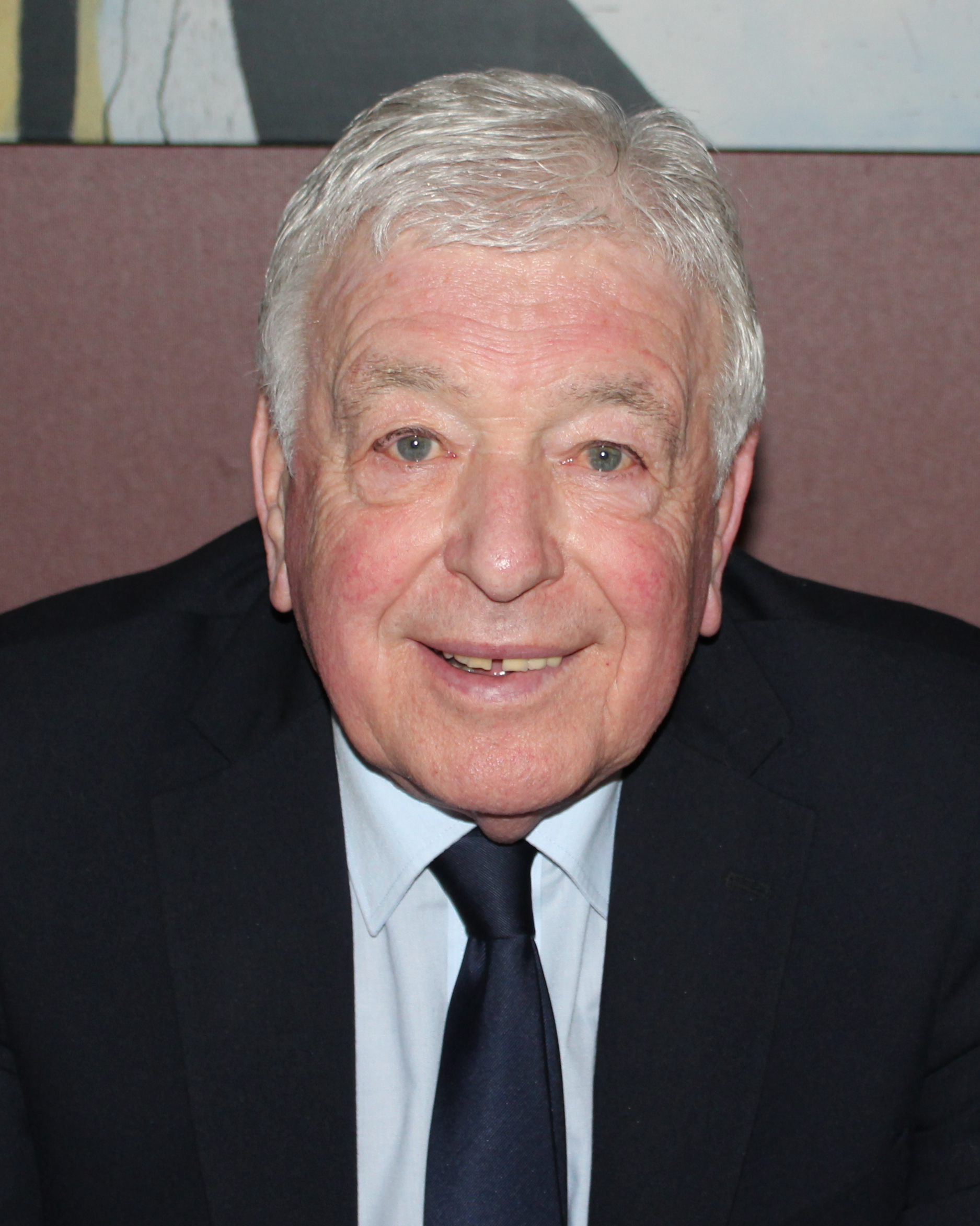
- Callaghan in 2016

Personal information
- Full name: Ian Robert Callaghan
- Date of birth: 10 April 1942 (age 84)
- Place of birth: Toxteth, Liverpool, England
- Height: 1.70 m (5 ft 7 in)
- Position: Midfielder

Senior career*
Years	Team	Apps	(Gls)
1959–1978	Liverpool	640	(49)
1978	→ Ft Lauderdale Strikers (loan)	20	(0)
1978–1981	Swansea City	76	(1)
1979	→ Canberra City (loan)	9	(0)
1981	Cork United	2	(0)
1981	Crewe Alexandra	15	(0)
Total		762	(50)

International career
1966–1977	England	4	(0)
- * Club domestic league appearances and goals

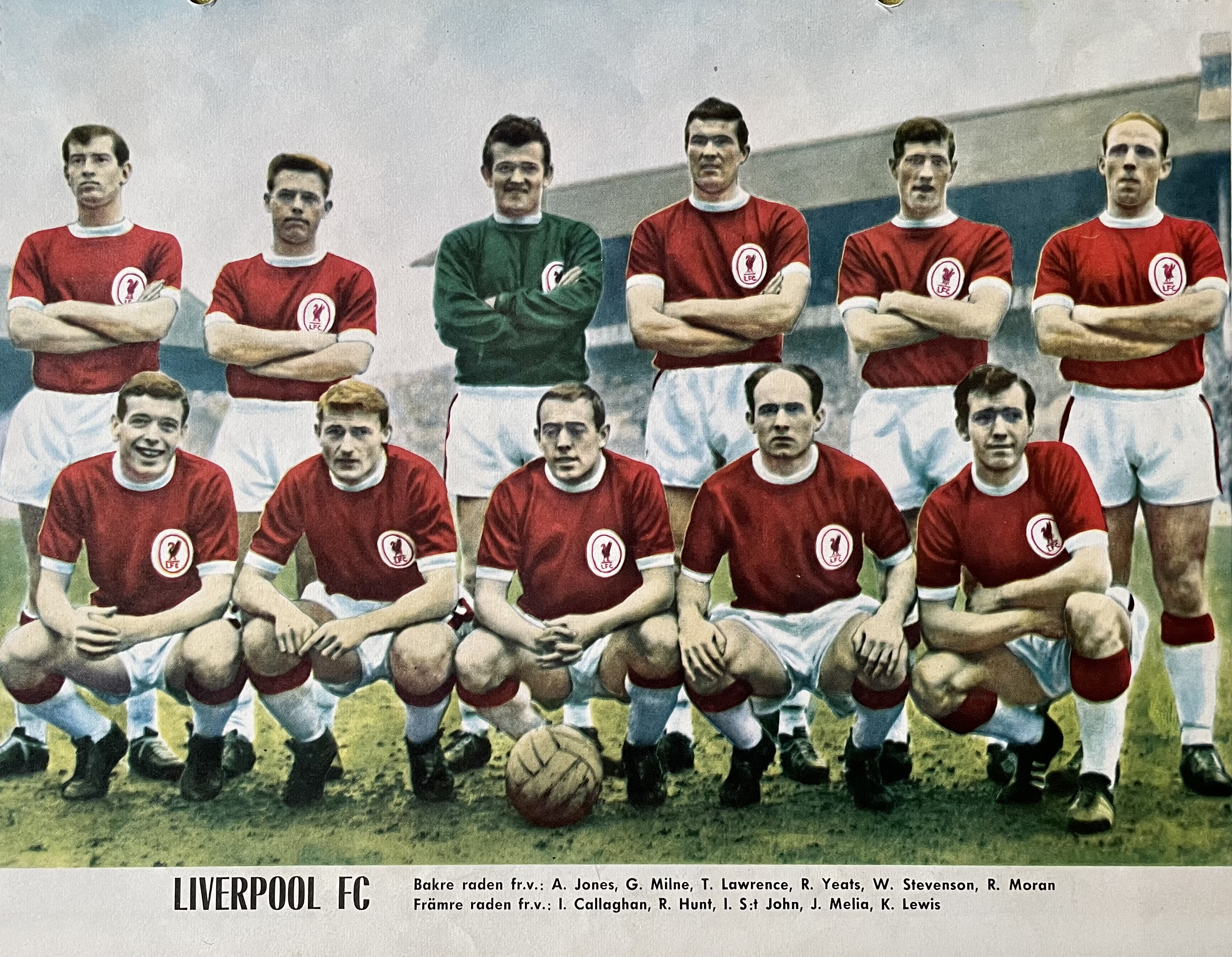
Liverpool F.C. at 1963 with following players, from left standing: Allan Jones, Gordon Milne, Tommy Lawrence, Ron Yeats (captain), Willie Stevenson, Ronnie Moran; front row: Ian Callaghan, Roger Hunt, Ian St John, Jimmy Melia and Kevin Lewis.

Ian Robert Callaghan MBE (born 10 April 1942) is an English former professional footballer who played as a midfielder. He holds the record for most appearances for Liverpool and the FA Cup. In addition, he is one of the few players to have made over 1,000 career appearances (the first English to achieve the feat, since the time matches are recorded).

He was appointed a Member of the Order of the British Empire (MBE) in the 1975 New Year Honours.

Callaghan along with Bobby Charlton are the only English footballers to have won the World Cup, European Cup and been awarded Player of the Year.

== Club career ==
=== Liverpool ===
Callaghan played 857 times for Liverpool between 1960 and 1978, breaking into the first team just after the appointment of Bill Shankly as Liverpool manager. He made his debut on 16 April 1960 at Anfield in a 4–0 victory over Bristol Rovers. He was a regular member of the first team by the time Liverpool won promotion to the First Division in 1962, and went on to help them win the league title in 1964, 1966, 1973, 1976 and 1977, as well as the 1965 and 1974 FA Cup finals, the UEFA Cup in 1973 and 1976, and the European Cup in 1977 and as an unused substitute in 1978 final. He was voted FWA Footballer of the Year in 1974. He was booked only once in his career, in the 1978 League Cup final replay at Old Trafford, which Liverpool lost to Nottingham Forest.

Callaghan played in the 1977 European Cup final, when Liverpool beat Borussia Mönchengladbach 3–1, but in the 1978 season, which proved to be his last year at the club, his playing time was reduced as younger additions like Graeme Souness and Kenny Dalglish established themselves at the club. Callaghan was on the substitutes' bench when Liverpool retained the European Cup against Club Brugge in 1978.

=== Later career ===
Callaghan left Liverpool shortly after the 1978 European Cup final and signed for Swansea City, managed by former Liverpool striker John Toshack. He helped Swansea win a second successive promotion in 1979, which took them into the Second Division, and also had brief spells playing in the United States, Australia and Ireland towards the end of his career. He spent the final season of his career in the Fourth Division with Crewe Alexandra, making 15 appearances in the 1981–82 season and retiring as a player in his 40th year.

== International career ==
Of Irish descent, Callaghan played four times at senior level for England. Although he was in the squad for the 1966 FIFA World Cup, he did not play in the final so did not receive a medal. He did play in the group-stage match against France, assisting Roger Hunt's second goal in the 2–0 win on 20 July 1966, one of three wingers tried before manager Alf Ramsey decided to go with a team with no wingers. Following a Football Association-led campaign to persuade FIFA to award medals to all the winners' squad members, Callaghan was presented with his medal by Prime Minister Gordon Brown at a ceremony at 10 Downing Street on 10 June 2009.

After that 1966 match against France, Callaghan's next England appearance, his third, came against Switzerland on 7 September 1977, aged 35. This gap of 11 years 49 days between appearances is the longest such interval for any England player.

== Career statistics ==
=== Club ===
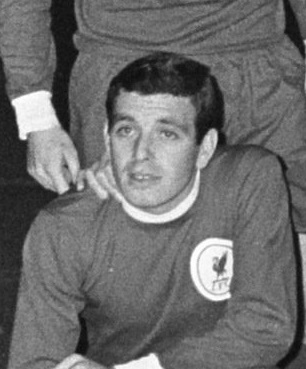
Callaghan with Liverpool in 1966

Appearances and goals by club, season and competition
Club	Season	League			FA Cup		League Cup		Continental		Other		Total	
Club	Season	Division	Apps	Goals	Apps	Goals	Apps	Goals	Apps	Goals	Apps	Goals	Apps	Goals
Liverpool	1959–60	Second Division	4	0	0	0	0	0	–		–		4	0
Liverpool	1960–61	Second Division	3	0	0	0	2	0	1	0	–		6	0
Liverpool	1961–62	Second Division	23	1	5	0	0	0	1	0	–		29	1
Liverpool	1962–63	First Division	37	2	6	0	0	0	–		–		43	2
Liverpool	1963–64	First Division	42	8	5	0	0	0	–		–		47	8
Liverpool	1964–65	First Division	37	6	8	1	0	0	10	1	1 (Note: Appearance in the FA Charity Shield)	0	56	8
Liverpool	1965–66	First Division	42	5	1	0	0	0	10	0	1	0	54	5
Liverpool	1966–67	First Division	40	4	4	0	0	0	6	1	1	0	51	5
Liverpool	1967–68	First Division	41	3	9	0	2	1	6	3	–		58	7
Liverpool	1968–69	First Division	42	8	4	1	3	1	2	0	–		51	10
Liverpool	1969–70	First Division	41	3	6	0	2	0	4	2	–		53	5
Liverpool	1970–71	First Division	23	0	5	0	1	0	5	0	–		34	0
Liverpool	1971–72	First Division	41	2	3	0	3	0	5	0	1	0	53	2
Liverpool	1972–73	First Division	42	3	4	0	8	1	12	0	–		66	4
Liverpool	1973–74	First Division	42	0	9	0	6	3	4	0	–		61	3
Liverpool	1974–75	First Division	41	1	2	0	3	0	5	1	1	0	52	2
Liverpool	1975–76	First Division	40	3	2	0	3	0	12	1	–		57	4
Liverpool	1976–77	First Division	33	1	5	0	2	1	8	0	1	0	49	2
Liverpool	1977–78	First Division	26	0	1	0	7	0	7	1	1	0	42	1
Liverpool	Total		640	50	79	2	42	7	98	10	6	0	865	69
Fort Lauderdale Strikers	1978	NASL	20	0	—		–		—		–		20	0
Swansea City	1978–79	Third Division	40	0	4	0	1	0	—		–		45	0
Swansea City	1979–80	Second Division	36	1	3	0	3	0	—		–		42	1
Swansea City	Total		76	1	7	0	4	0	0	0	0	0	87	1
Canberra City (loan)	1979	NSL	9	0	—		—		—		–		9	0
Cork United	1980–81	LOI	2	0	—		—		—		–		2	0
Crewe Alexandra	1981–82	Fourth Division	15	0	2	0	—		—		–		17	0
Career total			762	51	88	2	46	7	98	10	6	0	1000	70

=== International ===
Appearances and goals by national team and year
National team	Year	Apps	Goals
England	1966	2	0
England	1967	0	0
England	1968	0	0
England	1969	0	0
England	1970	0	0
England	1971	0	0
England	1972	0	0
England	1973	0	0
England	1974	0	0
England	1975	0	0
England	1976	0	0
England	1977	2	0
Total		4	0

== Honours ==
Liverpool

- Football League First Division: 1963–64, 1965–66, 1972–73, 1975–76, 1976–77
- Football League Second Division: 1961–62
- FA Cup: 1964–65, 1973–74; runner-up: 1970–71, 1976–77
- FA Charity Shield: 1964 (shared), 1965 (shared), 1966, 1974, 1976, 1977
- European Cup: 1976–77, 1977–78
- UEFA Cup: 1972–73, 1975–76
- European Super Cup: 1977
- Football League Cup runner-up: 1977–78

England

- FIFA World Cup: 1966

== See also ==
- List of men's footballers with the most official appearances
