= Bert Slater =

Scottish footballer

Personal information
- Full name: Robert Slater
- Date of birth: 5 May 1936
- Place of birth: Musselburgh, Scotland
- Date of death: 21 July 2006 (aged 70)
- Place of death: Brechin, Scotland
- Position: Goalkeeper

Youth career
- Tranent

Senior career*
Years	Team	Apps	(Gls)
1953–1959	Falkirk	134	(0)
1959–1962	Liverpool	99	(0)
1962–1965	Dundee	70	(0)
1965–1969	Watford	134	(0)
Total		437	(0)

International career
	Scotland U23	1	(0)
- * Club domestic league appearances and goals

Robert Slater (5 May 1936 – 21 July 2006) was a Scottish professional footballer who played as a goalkeeper. Slater played for Falkirk, Liverpool, Dundee and Watford during the 1950s and 1960s. He also played once for the Scotland under-23 team.

== Life and playing career ==
Born in Musselburgh, East Lothian, Scotland, Slater started his career as a 17-year-old at Falkirk. He won a Scottish Cup winners medal in 1957 and made his debut in front of a 90,000 predominantly Rangers crowd.

Liverpool signed him in exchange for Tommy Younger on 12 June 1959. He made his debut two months later at Ninian Park on 22 August, Cardiff City spoiled his day beaten the reds 3–2, Cardiff actually provided all 5 goals as City's Danny Malloy scored 2 own goals both being only 4 minutes apart. He kept his first clean-sheet on 12 December 1959 at the Eastville Stadium, Bristol Rovers were the side that were unable to break down the Reds defence as Liverpool won 2–0.

Slater was small for a goalkeeper standing at just 5 ft 8 in (1.73 m) and was nicknamed "Shorty" but he was immediately put into the Liverpool goal upon his arrival in 1959 after a disastrous start to the season the No.1 shirt was handed to Doug Rudman, but when Bill Shankly arrived Bert got his place back and went on to clock-up 30 appearances in all competitions. He followed this up by being an ever-present during the 1960/61 as Liverpool, incredibly finished 3rd (top 2 gained promotion) for a fifth straight season. Shankly rallied his troops and also brought in Ron Yeats and Ian St John to strengthen his side, it worked, Liverpool won the division by 8 points and were promoted to the top tier of English football after an 8-year break, Slater played his part by appearing 29 times, but he now had serious competition as Shankly had signed James Furnell from Burnley.

Things got worse for Slater, Tommy Lawrence, signed in 1957 as a 17-year-old, was beginning to mature and was starting knock on the first team door, Slater was now considered to be lower than the under-12 goalkeeper in the pecking order, according to Bill Shankly, and thus was deemed surplus to requirements. Bert moved to Dundee in July 1962, which meant that he was sold by Bill Shankly and signed by brother Bob.

Bob's Dundee had just won the Scottish league championship in 1961/62 and were about to embark on a European Cup campaign. Bob had rated Slater highly ever since a friendly between the two brothers' clubs in 1960 so when he became available Bob made sure he got his man paying £2,500 for Slater's services. Slater first introduction to European football was at Dens Park against Cologne, Dundee were 5 up by half-time and went on to win 8–1, Cologne only got the 1 because of an own-goal by Alex Hamilton. Cologne lost their keeper to injury at half-time. However, the Cologne players thought the challenge was a bad one and, rumour has it, were targeting Slater for reprisal in the 2nd leg. If they were by the 27th minute they got their man, Slater took a boot to the head which opened up, he was replaced by Andy Penman, an inside-forward, there were no subs back then. Cologne pulled the aggregate score back to 8–4 when a bandaged Slater returned to the game as a left winger, Cologne pushed forward and got another, this was too much for Slater who went back into the Dees goal, Dundee held on for a famous victory.

They also beat Sporting Clube de Portugal and Anderlecht to reach the European Cup semi-final, here they came up against cup favourites A.C Milan who proved to be too strong for Dundee, Milan went on to lift the trophy at Wembley Stadium.

In 1965 he moved to Watford, where he was the first choice goalkeeper for three years. Early in the 1968–69 season Mike Walker was bought and he replaced Slater as first-choice goalkeeper. Slater also became a coach and assistant manager at Vicarage Road before he retired from football.

Slater represented Scotland at under-23 level.

After hanging up his boots Bert worked for a company that designed golf courses and scouted for Dundee. Slater died in Brechin on 21 July 2006.

On 2024, Slater was inducted into Dundee's Hall of Fame, being awarded the Golden Era Award.

== Career details ==
- Falkirk F.C. (1953–1959) – ? appearances
  - Scottish Cup winners medal (1957)
- Liverpool F.C. (1959–1962) – 111 appearances
  - Division Two (level 2) championship winners medal (1962)
- Dundee F.C. (1962–1965) – ? appearances
- Watford F.C. (1965–1973) – 152 appearances
