= Alan Banks (footballer) =

English footballer (1938–2026)

Personal information
- Date of birth: 5 October 1938
- Place of birth: Liverpool, England
- Date of death: 3 July 2026 (aged 87)
- Position: Striker

Youth career
- Rankin Boys
- 1956–1958: Liverpool

Senior career*
Years	Team	Apps	(Gls)
1958–1961	Liverpool	8	(6)
1961–1963	Cambridge City		
1963–1966	Exeter City	85	(43)
1966–1967	Plymouth Argyle	19	(5)
1967–1973	Exeter City	173	(58)
1973–1975	Poole Town		
1975–1977	Tiverton Town	28	(9)
Total		313+	(136+)
- * Club domestic league appearances and goals

Alan Banks (5 October 1938 – 3 July 2026) was an English professional footballer who played as a striker.

== Career ==
Born in Liverpool, Banks played for Rankin Boys, Liverpool, Cambridge City, Exeter City, Plymouth Argyle, Poole Town and Tiverton Town.

Banks began his career at Liverpool as an amateur in August 1956, signing professionally in May 1958 and making his debut as a nineteen-year-old against Brighton and Hove Albion in September that year, scoring his first goal for the club in the same game. He then moved to Cambridge City, where he scored 129 goals in just over two seasons.

Exeter City paid out a club record fee to obtain his transfer from Cambridge in November 1963. He went on to score 109 goals in 285 games for Exeter, across two spells. He spent 18 months at Plymouth Argyle in between his two spells with Exeter.

After playing with Poole Town and Tiverton Town, Banks retired in 1977. In 2007 he was voted Exeter City's favourite player of all time.

== Later life and death ==
Banks and his wife opened a dress material business, and Banks later worked for Exeter City as a matchday host. He died on 3 July 2026, aged 87.
