= Jimmy Harrower (footballer, born 1935) =

Scottish footballer (1935-2006)

Personal information
- Full name: James Harrower
- Date of birth: 18 August 1935
- Place of birth: Alva, Scotland
- Date of death: 28 November 2006 (aged 71)
- Place of death: Stirling, Scotland
- Position: Inside forward

Youth career
- Sauchie
- Kilsyth Rangers
- Bo'ness United

Senior career*
Years	Team	Apps	(Gls)
1954–1958	Hibernian	36	(11)
1958–1961	Liverpool	96	(21)
1961–1962	Newcastle United	5	(0)
1962–1963	Falkirk	20	(2)
1963–1965	St Johnstone	42	(8)
1965–1966	Albion Rovers	22	(0)
Total		221	(42)

International career
1957	Scotland under-23	1	(0)
- * Club domestic league appearances and goals

James Harrower (18 August 1935 – 28 November 2006) was a Scottish professional footballer.

Born in Alva, Clackmannanshire, Harrower played junior football for Sauchie, Kilsyth Rangers and Bo'ness United before starting his senior career with Hibernian. Liverpool manager Phil Taylor signed him for £11,000. He made his Liverpool debut on 11 January 1958 in a 2nd Division match at Anfield, Fulham were the visitors as Liverpool took the points with a 2–1 victory. The attacking midfielder scored his first goal on 28 March, as Liverpool beat Ipswich Town 3–1.

Harrower was a player with a knack of pulling off amazing trickery with the ball, but like so many players with this ability he lacked the consistency required to play at the highest level; in fact he used to irritate the Anfield crowd who knew what he could do but never saw enough of it. His best season at Liverpool was his first full season 1958–59: he missed just 5 matches and scored 6 goals. Unfortunately for James, the manager who signed him, Taylor, left the club at the end of the campaign and his replacement Bill Shankly decided that change was needed. James was vying for the inside-left position with Jimmy Melia, but midway through the campaign Shankly decided that Melia was the man for the job. Melia kept the position the following season and the future looked bleak for Harrower in a red shirt; in the March 1961 he was on his way, moving to Newcastle United.

He spent a year on Tyneside playing just 6 games, he then moved back to Scotland joining Falkirk. He also played for St Johnstone, Albion Rovers and Alloa Athletic. Harrower also represented Scotland at Under-23 level.
