= Gordon Wallace (footballer, born 1944) =

Scottish footballer

Personal information
- Date of birth: 13 June 1944 (age 82)
- Place of birth: Lanark, Scotland
- Position: Inside forward

Youth career
- 1960–1962: Liverpool

Senior career*
Years	Team	Apps	(Gls)
1962–1967	Liverpool	20	(3)
1967–1972	Crewe Alexandra	93	(22)
Total		113	(25)
- * Club domestic league appearances and goals

Gordon Wallace (born 13 June 1944 in Lanark) is a Scottish former footballer, who played for Liverpool during the 1960s.

== Career ==
Wallace was raised in Wales after his father Dougie, also a footballer, transferred to Llanelli Town in 1949. Gordon attended school with future rugby union star Barry John and had trials with Huddersfield Town while Bill Shankly was the Yorkshire club's manager. Shankly moved to Liverpool in late 1959, and soon brought in the teenage Wallace as an apprentice.

During his spell at Anfield, his main claims to fame were netting the opening goal in the 1964 FA Charity Shield, scoring twice in a match covered on the very first BBC "Match of the Day" programme, and being Liverpool's first ever European Champions' Cup goalscorer (the first goal in an away tie against KR Reykjavík), all occurring in August 1964.

Despite such a promising start his first team opportunities were limited by the consistency, fitness and excellent disciplinary records of Liverpool's twin strike force, Roger Hunt and Ian St John, respectively England and Scotland internationals. Wallace played for Liverpool Reserves between 1965 and 1967. When Tony Hateley joined Liverpool in 1967, Wallace left on a free transfer, joining Crewe Alexandra.

He shone at Crewe and was an important element of the team that won promotion to Division 3 in the 1967–68 season. His form the following season began to attract interest from higher league sides until a home game versus Watford on 28 September 1968, when a tackle from behind broke his leg. It took him 13 months to return to first team football, but he never managed to regain the form of old. He played his final game for Crewe away at Colchester on 17 September 1972. Wallace scored 20 goals in 94 league appearances for Crewe.

== Honours ==
Liverpool

- Charity Shield: 1964 (Shared)

Crewe Alexandra

- Football League Fourth Division fourth-place promotion: 1967–68
