= Kevin Lewis (footballer, born 1940) =

English footballer

Personal information
- Date of birth: 19 September 1940 (age 86)
- Place of birth: Ellesmere Port, England
- Position: Winger

Youth career
- Sheffield United

Senior career*
Years	Team	Apps	(Gls)
1957–1960	Sheffield United	62	(23)
1960–1963	Liverpool	71	(39)
1963–1965	Huddersfield Town	45	(13)
1966–1967	Wigan Athletic	8	(3)
1974	Washington Diplomats	5	(0)
- * Club domestic league appearances and goals

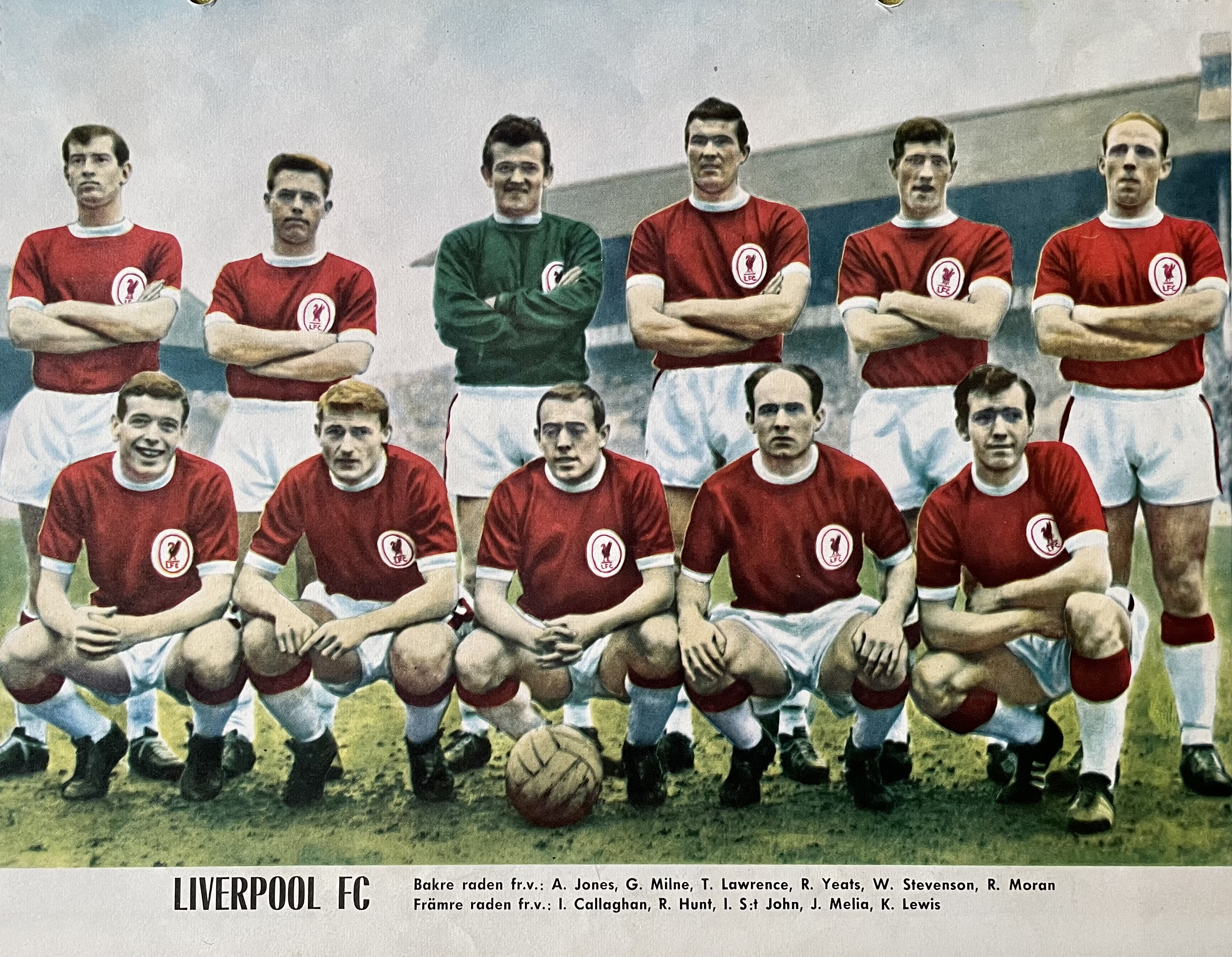
Liverpool F.C. at 1963 with following players, from left standing: Allan Jones, Gordon Milne, Tommy Lawrence, Ron Yeats (captain), Willie Stevenson, Ronnie Moran; front row: Ian Callaghan, Roger Hunt, Ian St John, Jimmy Melia and Kevin Lewis.

Kevin Lewis (born 19 September 1940 in Ellesmere Port) is an English former professional footballer who played as a winger in the Football League for Sheffield United, Liverpool and Huddersfield Town.

Lewis was signed by Liverpool in 1960, and was the club's top scorer in the 1960–61 season.

He also played for Wigan Athletic in the Cheshire League, scoring three goals in eight games.
