= Roger Hunt =

English footballer (1938–2021)

Roger Hunt MBE
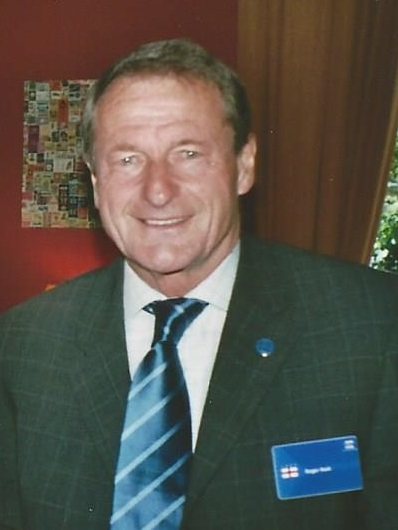
- Hunt in 2006

Personal information
- Date of birth: 20 July 1938
- Place of birth: Glazebury, Lancashire, England
- Date of death: 27 September 2021 (aged 83)
- Place of death: Warrington, Cheshire, England
- Height: 5 ft 9 in (1.75 m)
- Position: Forward

Youth career
- Croft Youth Club

Senior career*
Years	Team	Apps	(Gls)
1956–1958	Stockton Heath	44	(69)
- Devizes Town
- Stockton Heath
1958–1969	Liverpool	404	(244)
1969–1972	Bolton Wanderers	76	(24)
1971	→ Hellenic (loan)	6	(4)
Total		530	(341)

International career
1962–1969	England	34	(18)
Medal record
Men's football
Representing England
FIFA World Cup
Winner	1966 England
- * Club domestic league appearances and goals

Roger Hunt (20 July 1938 – 27 September 2021) was an English professional footballer who played as a forward. Regarded as one of Liverpool's greatest ever players, Hunt is the club's second-highest goalscorer with 285 goals, and its record league goalscorer with 244 goals. An England international, he won the FIFA World Cup in 1966.

Making his Liverpool debut in 1959, during Hunt's eleven years with the club he was top scorer for eight seasons in a row, and he was the club's record goalscorer until being overtaken by Ian Rush in 1992. He remains Liverpool's record league goalscorer having surpassed Gordon Hodgson in 1969. Under manager Bill Shankly, Hunt won two league titles and an FA Cup. In August 1964 he also scored the first ever goal seen on the BBC's Match of the Day. He was bestowed with an honorary knighthood by Liverpool fans who referred to him as Sir Roger. In 2006 he was ranked 13th on the 100 Players Who Shook the Kop, an official fan poll. In 2026 he was ranked the club's 9th greatest player in another official poll.

As a member of the England team that won the 1966 FIFA World Cup Hunt played in all of England's six games, scoring three times. He was inducted into the English Football Hall of Fame in 2006.

== Club career ==
=== Early career ===
Born in Glazebury, Lancashire, Hunt played for Croft Youth Club, Stockton Heath and Devizes Town during his formative years.

=== Liverpool ===
He was signed for Liverpool by manager Phil Taylor in July 1958, joining from Stockton Heath. Hunt made his debut and scored his first goal for the club on 9 September 1959 in a Second Division fixture at Anfield against Scunthorpe United; Hunt scored in the 64th minute to give the Reds a 2–0 victory. This goal was the first of many – he went on to score 286 goals for the club, 244 of them in the league, which remains a club record.

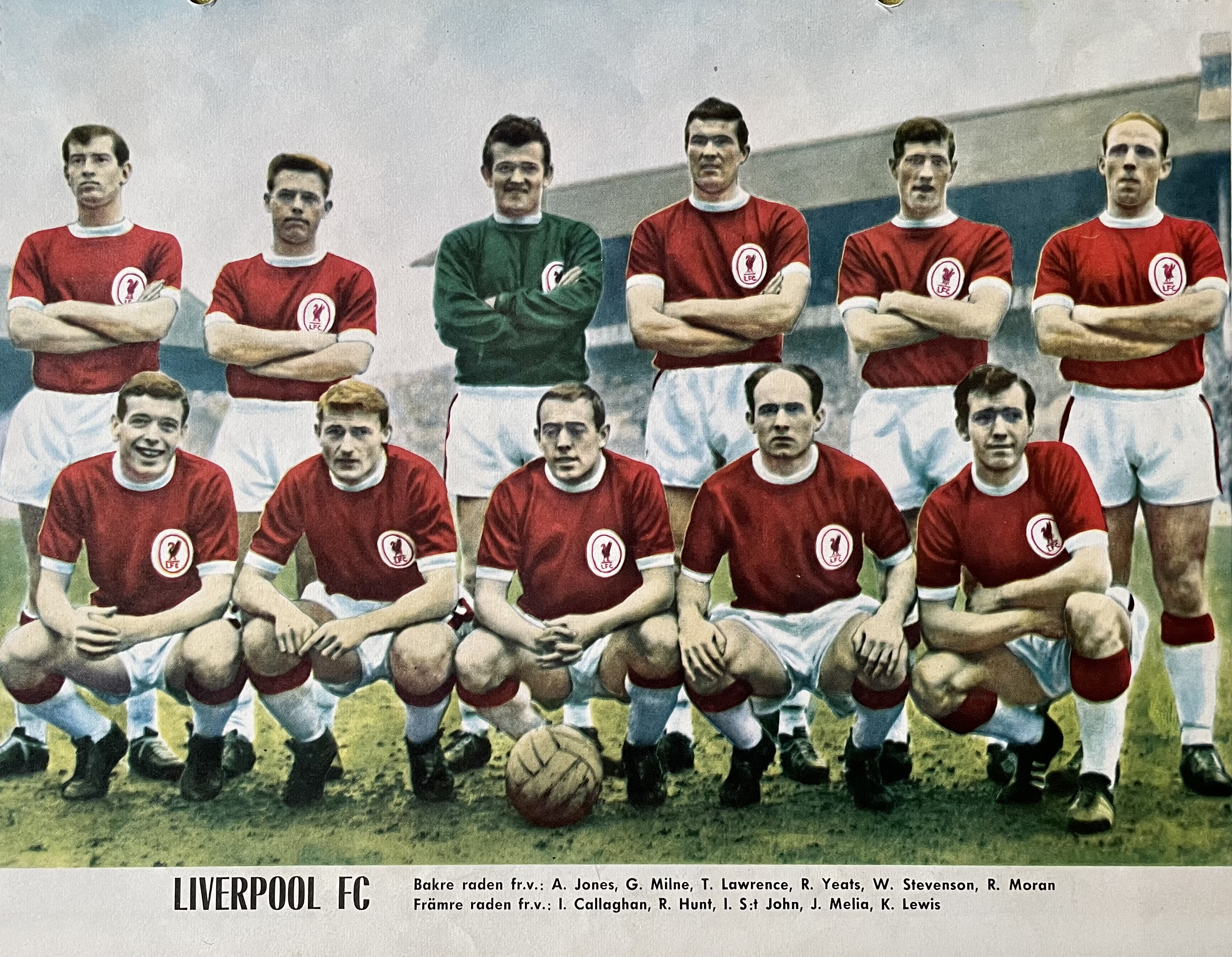
Portrait of Liverpool in 1963. Hunt is in the front row, second from left.

After Bill Shankly replaced Taylor, Shankly and his fellow 'Boot Room' coaching staff embarked upon a clear out of 24 players. Hunt however was retained and was a major factor in the Reds' success in the 1960s. Liverpool gained promotion to the First Division in 1962, after the club had finished 3rd or 4th, and thus just outside the promotion spots for five consecutive years from 1956 to 1961. Hunt appeared in 41 of the 42 league games and scored 41 goals in season 1961–1962. His goals helped propel Liverpool to a comfortable eight point title win over runners-up Leyton Orient and included five hat-tricks, coming against Leeds United, Walsall, Swansea Town, former club Bury and Middlesbrough. It was a similar story in 1963–64 and 1965–66 as Liverpool were English League champions. Hunt again the top scorer (as he was for eight straight seasons) scoring 31 goals from 41 games and 29 goals from 37 appearances respectively. On 22 August 1964, Hunt scored against Arsenal after 11 minutes in a 3–2 home win, the first ever goal seen on the BBC's flagship football highlights programme Match of the Day.

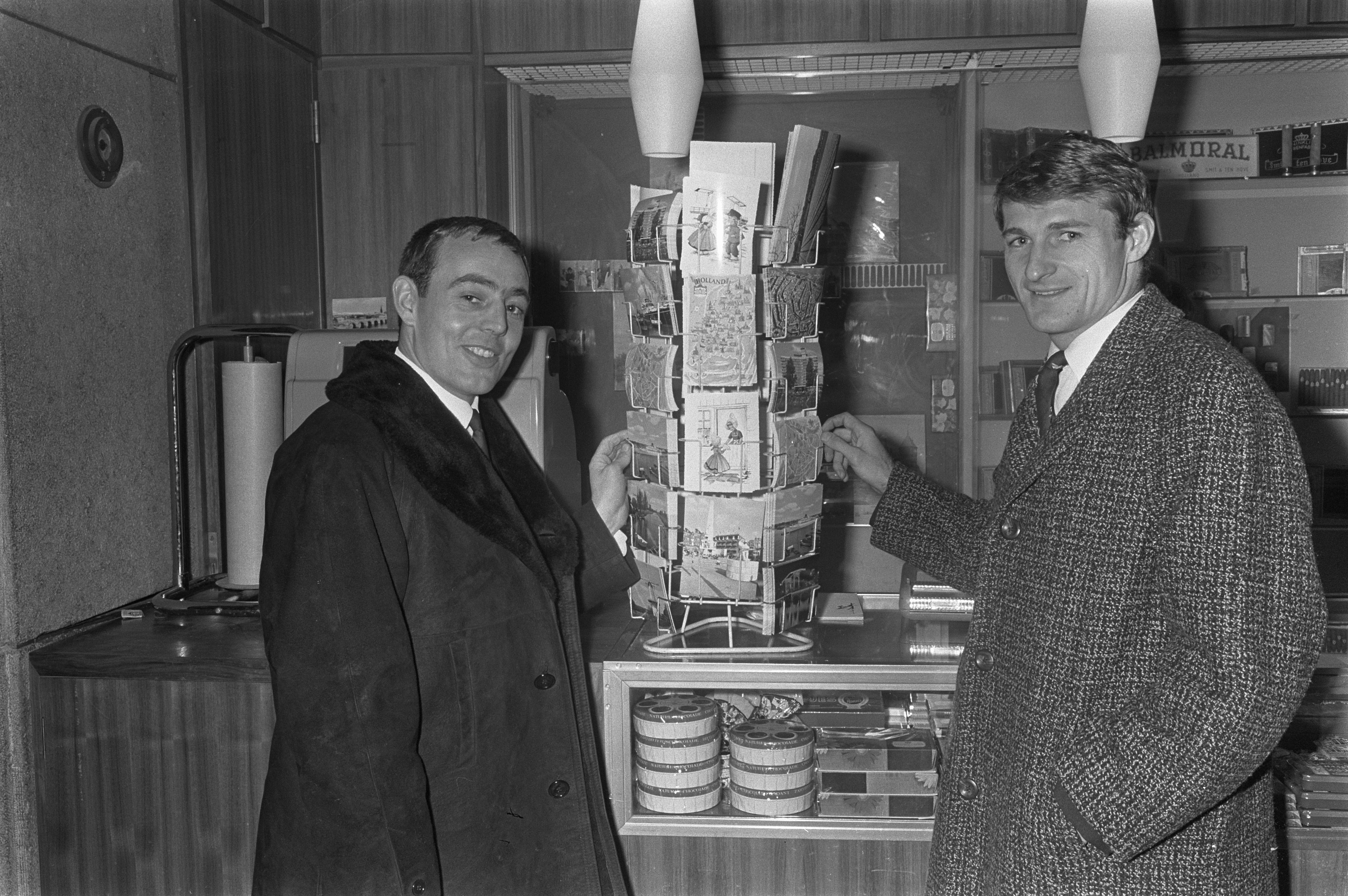
Hunt (right) and Liverpool strike partner Ian St John in 1966

In between the two titles, in 1965 he was instrumental in the side winning the FA Cup for the first time. Hunt scored four times in a cup run that saw West Bromwich Albion, Stockport County, Bolton Wanderers, Leicester City and Chelsea all defeated as Liverpool reached the final for the first time since 1950. In the final, after a goal-less 90 minutes, Hunt scored the opening goal in the 93rd minute and strike partner Ian St. John scored the second as the Reds recorded a 2–1 victory over Leeds United at Wembley. He scored Liverpool's only goal in the final of the Cup Winners Cup the following year, as they lost 2–1 after extra time to Borussia Dortmund.

He became Liverpool's record goalscorer on 7 November 1967 in an Inter-Cities Fairs Cup tie against TSV 1860 Munich of West Germany, in which he scored his 242nd goal for the club. His final tally for the club was 286 goals by the time he left the club in 1969 to join Bolton Wanderers, a record that was not broken until Ian Rush 23 years later. He also held the record of scoring 100 top-flight goals in fewer games (152) than any player in Liverpool history, until Mohamed Salah reached the milestone in one game less in September 2021.

=== Later career ===
He signed for Bolton Wanderers in December 1969. In 1971, he moved on loan to Hellenic F.C. in South Africa's National Football League. He retired in 1972, and had a testimonial with Liverpool in April 1972, attended by 56,000 people.

== International career ==
Hunt was capped 34 times for his country, with his debut given to him by Walter Winterbottom whilst he was still a Second Division player on 4 April 1962, in a friendly against Austria at Wembley. He scored on his international debut as England won 3–1. He was part of the England squad at the 1962 FIFA World Cup in Chile, but was not selected to play.

England had been chosen to host the 1966 FIFA World Cup, and Hunt, along with Liverpool club mates Ian Callaghan and Gerry Byrne, were selected by manager Alf Ramsey for the 22-man squad. Hunt was one of three forwards selected for the tournament. He initially partnered Tottenham Hotspur striker Jimmy Greaves up front, but following a leg injury to Greaves he played alongside Geoff Hurst of West Ham United. He played in all six games, scoring three times, twice against France and once against Mexico, as England went on to win the Jules Rimet trophy after a 4–2 extra time win over West Germany in the World Cup Final at Wembley.

A section of the England fans (from the south of England) blamed Hunt (a northerner who played for a northern team) for replacing Greaves in the 1966 FIFA World Cup Final, and would boo him on his subsequent appearances for England (even though it was actually the Londoner Geoff Hurst who replaced Greaves). Following this, Hunt eventually told Alf Ramsey in 1969, following a game against Romania, that he no longer wished to play for England, and retired from international football.

== Later and personal life ==
After retiring as a player, he joined his brother Peter, in taking over Hunt Brothers, as the third generation of the family-run haulage business. It was originally established by Richard and Harry Hunt in 1929.

In 2000 he was awarded an MBE for his World Cup victory. He continued to be known as "Sir" Roger Hunt by the Liverpool supporters, despite the absence of a formal knighthood.

Hunt was inducted into the English Football Hall of Fame in 2006, recognising his achievements in the English game. He was voted at number 13 by Liverpool fans on the official Liverpool Football Club in the 100 Players Who Shook The Kop poll, also in 2006. In 2016 he was made an Honorary Freeman of the Borough of Warrington.

Hunt was married in 1959 to Patricia O'Brien (whom he met when working at her brother-in-law's nightclub) and they had two children. They divorced in 1981 then Hunt met his second wife Rowan (Green). He lived with his wife Rowan (Green), Croft, near Warrington.

Hunt died on 27 September 2021 at the age of 83. His funeral was held on 14 October at Liverpool Cathedral.

== Career statistics ==
=== Club ===
Appearances and goals by club, season and competition
Club	Season	League			FA Cup		League Cup		Europe		Other		Total	
Club	Season	Division	Apps	Goals	Apps	Goals	Apps	Goals	Apps	Goals	Apps	Goals	Apps	Goals
Liverpool	1959–60	Second Division	36	21	2	2	0	0	–		–		38	23
Liverpool	1960–61	Second Division	32	15	1	1	3	3	–		–		36	19
Liverpool	1961–62	Second Division	41	41	5	1	0	0	–		–		46	42
Liverpool	1962–63	First Division	42	24	6	2	0	0	–		–		48	26
Liverpool	1963–64	First Division	41	31	5	2	0	0	–		–		46	33
Liverpool	1964–65	First Division	40	25	8	5	0	0	9 (Note: Appearances in European Cup)	7	1 (Note: Appearance in FA Charity Shield)	0	58	37
Liverpool	1965–66	First Division	37	29	1	1	0	0	7 (Note: Appearances in European Cup Winners' Cup)	2	1	0	46	32
Liverpool	1966–67	First Division	39	14	3	1	0	0	5	3	1	1	48	19
Liverpool	1967–68	First Division	40	25	9	2	2	0	6 (Note: Appearances in Inter-Cities Fairs Cup)	3	–		57	30
Liverpool	1968–69	First Division	38	13	4	1	3	2	2	1	–		47	17
Liverpool	1969–70	First Division	18	6	0	0	2	0	2	1	–		22	7
Liverpool	Total		404	244	44	18	10	5	31	17	3	1	492	285
Bolton Wanderers	1969–70	Second Division	17	5	0	0	0	0	–		–		17	5
Bolton Wanderers	1970–71	Second Division	24	8	0	0	0	0	–		–		24	8
Bolton Wanderers	1971–72	Third Division	35	11	0	0	0	0	–		–		35	11
Bolton Wanderers	Total		76	24	0	0	0	0	0	0	0	0	76	24
Career total			480	268	44	18	10	5	31	17	3	1	568	309

=== International ===
Scores and results list England's goal tally first, score column indicates score after each Hunt goal.

List of international goals scored by Roger Hunt
No.	Date	Venue	Opponent	Score	Result	Competition
1	4 April 1962	London, England	Austria	3–0	3–1	Friendly
2	2 June 1963	Leipzig, East Germany	East Germany	1–1	2–1	Friendly
3	27 May 1964	New York City, United States	United States	1–0	10–0	Friendly
4	27 May 1964	New York City, United States	United States	3–0	10–0	Friendly
5	27 May 1964	New York City, United States	United States	6–0	10–0	Friendly
6	27 May 1964	New York City, United States	United States	7–0	10–0	Friendly
7	4 June 1964	São Paulo, Brazil	Portugal	1–1	1–1	Taça das Nações
8	8 December 1965	Madrid, Spain	Spain	2–0	2–0	Friendly
9	2 April 1966	Glasgow, Scotland	Scotland	2–0	4–3	1965-66 British Home Championship
10	2 April 1966	Glasgow, Scotland	Scotland	3–1	4–3	1965-66 British Home Championship
11	26 June 1966	Helsinki, Finland	Finland	2–0	3–0	Friendly
12	5 July 1966	Chorzów, Poland	Poland	1–0	1–0	Friendly
13	16 July 1966	London, England	Mexico	2–0	2–0	1966 FIFA World Cup
14	20 July 1966	London, England	France	1–0	2–0	1966 FIFA World Cup
15	20 July 1966	London, England	France	2–0	2–0	1966 FIFA World Cup
16	22 October 1966	Belfast, Northern Ireland	Northern Ireland	1–0	2–0	1966–67 British Home Championship
17	24 May 1967	London, England	Spain	2–0	2–0	Friendly
18	22 May 1968	London, England	Sweden	3–0	3–1	Friendly

== Honours ==
Liverpool

- Football League First Division: 1963–64, 1965–66
- Football League Second Division: 1961–62
- FA Cup: 1964–65
- FA Charity Shield: 1964, 1965, 1966

England

- FIFA World Cup: 1966

Individual

- English Second Division top scorer: 1961–62
- English First Division top scorer: 1965–66
- English Football Hall of Fame: Inductee 2006
- Liverpool Football Club Hall of Fame: Inductee
