= Tommy Leishman =

Scottish footballer and manager (1937–2021)

- Leishman in 1962

Personal information
- Full name: Thomas Leishman
- Date of birth: 3 September 1937
- Place of birth: Stenhousemuir, Scotland
- Date of death: 21 July 2021 (aged 83)
- Position: Wing half

Youth career
- Cowie Juveniles
- Camelon Juniors
- 1953–1954: St Mirren

Senior career*
Years	Team	Apps	(Gls)
1954–1959	St Mirren	15	(1)
1959–1963	Liverpool	107	(6)
1963–1965	Hibernian	30	(1)
1965–1967	Linfield		
1967–1970	Stranraer	62	(4)

Managerial career
- 1965–1967: Linfield
- * Club domestic league appearances and goals

Thomas Leishman (3 September 1937 – 21 July 2021) was a Scottish professional footballer, who played as a wing-half.

== Life and playing career ==
Born in Stenhousemuir, Scotland, Leishman played for St Mirren before Liverpool signed him for £10,000 on 20 November 1959. He made his debut a month later in a 2–0 2nd Division win over Charlton Athletic at Anfield. His first goal came in the 11th minute of a league match at The Dell on 24 August 1960, unfortunately it turned out to be a consolation as the Saints hit 4 past the Reds backline.

Leishman, like new manager Bill Shankly, joined Liverpool in November 1959 from St Mirren, where he had won a Scottish Cup winners medal the previous May, St Mirren having beaten Aberdeen 3–1 in the Hampden Park final. Tommy had a great touch but he was also a driving force in the middle of the park, he settled in well and appeared 17 times in the remainder of the 1959–60 season.

He followed this by missing just three fixtures in his first full season with the club as Liverpool missed out on promotion, finishing third for the fifth straight season. The following year they finally achieved their goal as they finished eight points clear of second placed Leyton Orient with Leishman missing just one game. He had been a regular for the club during its Second Division days, but found himself reduced to 11 appearances during the first half of the season as the club returned to the big time and he was allowed to leave during January 1963.

Leishman returned to Scotland and joined Hibernian for the same amount the Reds paid for him, £10,000. He failed to secure a regular place in the Hibs first team and he joined Irish League side Linfield as their player-manager. He was named as the Ulster Footballer of the Year for the 1965–66 season. He returned to Scotland with Stranraer, where he ended his career.

Leishman died on 21 July 2021, at the age of 83.

== Honours ==
=== As player ===
St Mirren

- Scottish Cup: 1959

Liverpool

- Football League Second Division: 1961–62

=== As player-manager ===
Linfield

- Irish Cup: Runner-up 1966
