= Ron Yeats =

Scottish footballer (1937–2024)

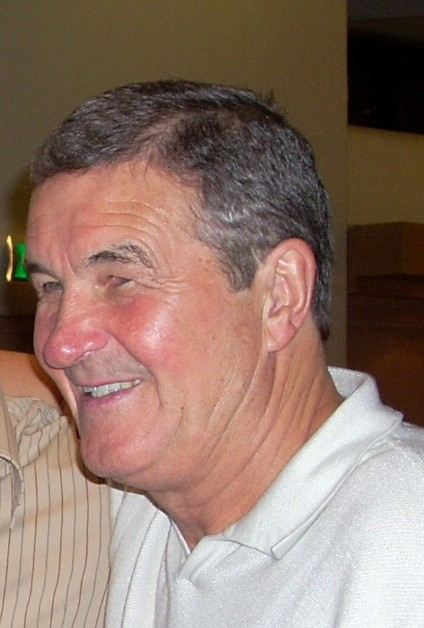
- Yeats in 2007

Personal information
- Full name: Ronald Yeats
- Date of birth: 15 November 1937
- Place of birth: Aberdeen, Scotland
- Date of death: 6 September 2024 (aged 86)
- Height: 6 ft 2 in (1.88 m)
- Position: Centre half

Youth career
- 1955–1957: Aberdeen Lads' Club

Senior career*
Years	Team	Apps	(Gls)
1957–1961	Dundee United	96	(1)
1961–1971	Liverpool	358	(13)
1971–1974	Tranmere Rovers	97	(5)
1975	Stalybridge Celtic		
1975–1977	Barrow		
1976	→ Los Angeles Skyhawks (loan)		
1977	Santa Barbara Condors		
1977	Formby	10	(0)
1977–1978	Rhyl		
Total		561	(19)

International career
1964	SFA trial v SFL	1	(0)
1964–1966	Scotland	2	(0)

Managerial career
- 1971–1974: Tranmere Rovers
- 1975–1977: Barrow
- 1977: Santa Barbara Condors
- * Club domestic league appearances and goals

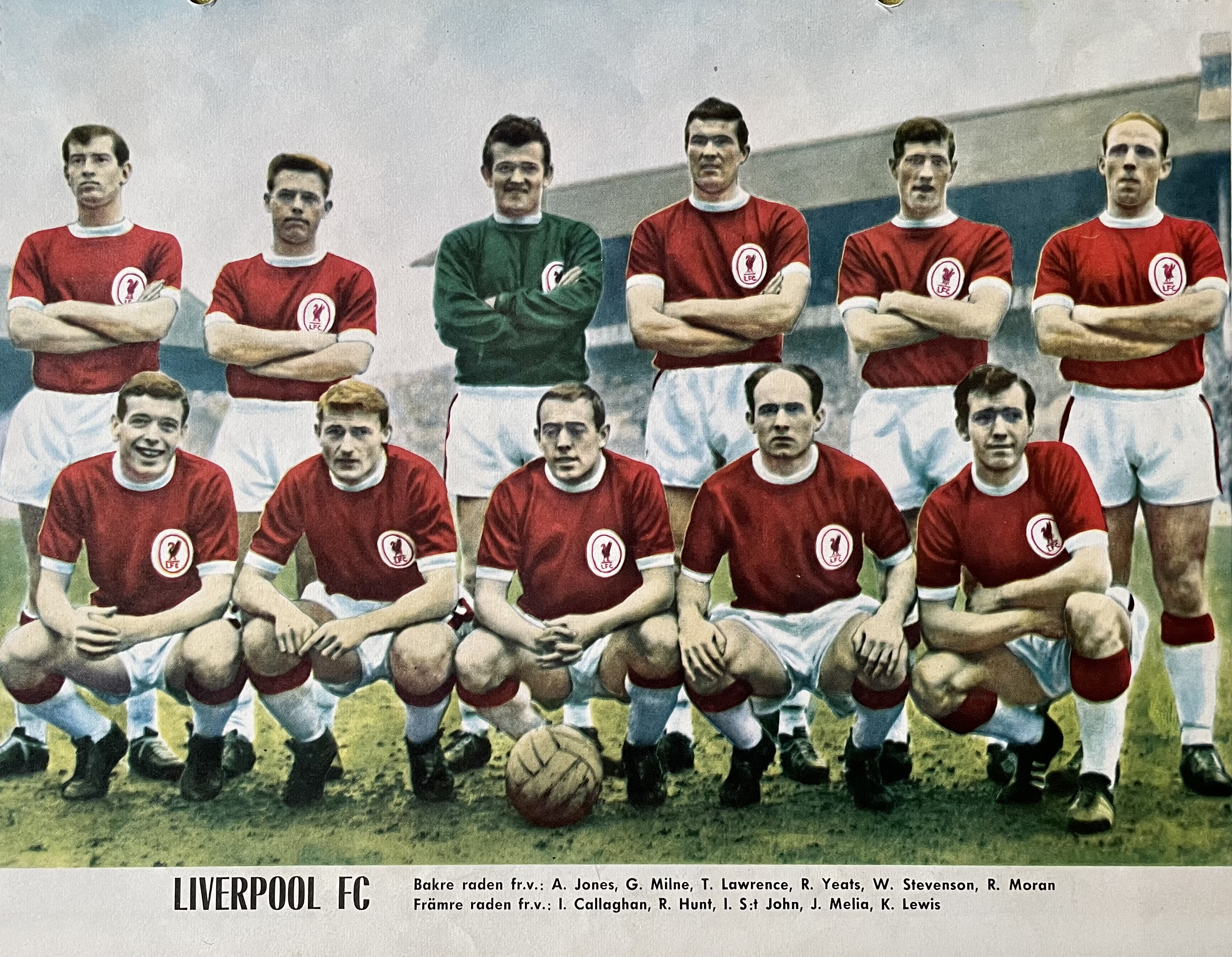
Liverpool F.C. at 1963 with following players, from left standing: Allan Jones, Gordon Milne, Tommy Lawrence, Ron Yeats (captain), Willie Stevenson, Ronnie Moran; front row: Ian Callaghan, Roger Hunt, Ian St John, Jimmy Melia and Kevin Lewis.

Ronald Yeats (15 November 1937 – 6 September 2024) was a Scottish footballer who played as a centre half.

He started his professional career with Dundee United in 1957 before joining Liverpool in 1961. He became club captain and won six trophies—two league titles, one FA Cup and three Charity Shields—over the following ten years. In 1971, he joined Tranmere Rovers, where he spent three years as player-manager before serving in the same role at Barrow and Santa Barbara Condors.

He also won two caps for the Scotland national team.

== Career ==
Yeats was an Under-15 schoolboy international who played for Aberdeen Lads' Club, a Junior club in his home city of Aberdeen. In 1956, following a leg break, Yeats had a trial with Elgin City, then a Highland League club, but was not offered a contract.

=== Dundee United ===
In 1957 he was signed by Dundee United, then a part-time club of Scottish Division Two. Previous to signing for the club, he worked in a slaughterhouse in Aberdeen.

Yeats's career took an upward turn following Jerry Kerr's appointment: Kerr regarded Yeats as so vital to the fortunes of the team he sought his release to play each Saturday from the military authorities while Yeats served his National Service. In 1959–60, Kerr's first full season in charge, St Johnstone finished as Division Two champions. United's challengers for the second promotion spot were Hamilton Academical and Queen of the South. Hamilton were beaten 5–1 at Tannadice with seven games to go before a crowd of over 11,000, putting Hamilton firmly in United's rear view. United went to Palmerston Park to play the Ivor Broadis inspired Queen of the South with three games to go. United returned home with a 4–4 draw to maintain their one-point advantage over QoS. Promotion was clinched with a last game of the season 1–0 home win against Berwick Rangers before a crowd of near 17,000. This brought top division football back to Tannadice Park for the first time since they had been relegated in 1932.

In the following 1960–61 season, United retained their top division place, finishing in ninth. Other players to flourish like Yeats were the forward pair Dennis Gillespie and Jim Irvine. Yeats played 118 matches (95 in the league) for Dundee United.

=== Liverpool ===
Yeats, a stockily built 6 ft 2 in central defender, was bought by manager Bill Shankly in 1961 from United for a fee of around £20,000 and was immediately installed as captain. When Yeats was signed, Shankly was so impressed with the physical presence of his new player that he told waiting journalists "The man is a mountain, go into the dressing room and walk around him". Shankly later described Yeats's arrival, along with that of striker Ian St John also in the 1961 close season, as the "turning point" as Liverpool began their quest to compete with — and beat — the best in England and in Europe. Yeats made his debut in a 2–0 league victory over Bristol Rovers at Eastville on 19 August 1961. After Yeats's first season, Liverpool gained promotion from the Second Division with a runaway eight-point margin over their nearest rivals (two points for a win) after eight seasons away from English football's top flight. His first goal came on 23 November 1963 in the 75th minute of the 1–0 First Division victory over Manchester United at Old Trafford. Yeats lived up to the reputation and the nickname ("The Colossus") his huge frame gave him, playing at the heart of Liverpool's defence for a decade and winning the club's first major honours in nearly 20 years.

Liverpool were the 1963–64 Football League champions. The next season, they won the 1964–65 FA Cup beating Leeds United 2–1 after extra time in the final at Wembley Stadium. This was the club's first ever FA Cup trophy. However Liverpool lost in the European Cup semi-final to Inter Milan that season. The next season Yeats skippered Liverpool to the 1965–66 Football League title. In Europe Liverpool reached the 1966 UEFA Cup Winners' Cup Final at Hampden Park in Yeats native Scotland. However Liverpool lost out after extra time to Borussia Dortmund.

In the 1966–67 European Cup second round, Yeats and co were given a torrid time by a Johan Cruyff inspired Ajax, who won 5–1 in Amsterdam and 7–3 on aggregate. The success of Liverpool then dried up, and he was one of the high-profile victims of a massive cull of the older players which Shankly ruthlessly undertook in 1970 in an effort to rebuild the side for a new decade. After 454 games, Yeats left in 1971. He had played a record 417 games as captain for Liverpool, which was later surpassed by Steven Gerrard.

Yeats won both his full caps for Scotland during the three seasons when the Liverpool team of the 1960s were at their peak. The first came on 3 October 1964 in a 3–2 defeat to Wales at Ninian Park, Cardiff. His second was a year later in December 1965 in a World Cup qualification decider away to Italy. The Scots had beaten the Italians 1–0 at Hampden Park. However Jock Stein's side missing the absent Denis Law went out when losing 3–0 in Naples.

=== Later years and retirement ===
Yeats served Tranmere Rovers for three years as player-manager.

Yeats had a short spell playing for Stalybridge Celtic. He then served Barrow as player manager.

In 1976 at age 38, Yeats joined the Los Angeles Skyhawks of the American Soccer League at the request of Skyhawk coach Ron Newman. In his only season there, he played sweeper and anchored the defence of the A.S.L. champion Skyhawks. In 1977, Yeats became the player coach of the American Soccer League's Santa Barbara Condors expansion team.

Returning to Liverpool, he had a short spell at the start of the 1977–78 season playing for Formby before moving to Rhyl in November 1977. In 1986 Yeats returned to Anfield as the club's chief scout responsible for delegating duties to the club's talent spotters. He remained in that role until his retirement in May 2006.

== Death ==
In January 2024, it was announced that Yeats was living with Alzheimer's disease. He died from complications of the disease on 6 September 2024, at the age of 86.

== Legacy ==
Yeats was voted 29th in the official Liverpool website poll "100 Players Who Shook The Kop".

In April 2009, Yeats was made an "Honorary Scouser" by the Lord Mayor of Liverpool.

He is referenced in the Everton song "Royal Blue Mersey" in the line "We hate Bill Shankly, and we hate St. John, but most of all we hate Big Ron."

== Career statistics ==
Appearances and goals by club, season and competition
Club	Season	League			National cup		League cup		Europe		Others		Total	
Club	Season	Division	Apps	Goals	Apps	Goals	Apps	Goals	Apps	Goals	Apps	Goals	Apps	Goals
Dundee United	1957–58	Scottish Division Two	15	0	2	0	0	0	0	0	0	0	17	0
Dundee United	1958–59	Scottish Division Two	19	0	4	0	3	0	0	0	0	0	26	0
Dundee United	1959–60	Scottish Division Two	33	1	2	0	5	0	–		0	0	40	1
Dundee United	1960–61	Scottish Division One	28	0	1	0	6	0	–		0	0	35	0
Dundee United	Total		95	1	9	0	14	0	0	0	0	0	118	1
Liverpool	1961–62	Second Division	41	0	5	0	0	0	0	0	0	0	46	0
Liverpool	1962–63	First Division	38	0	6	0	0	0	0	0	0	0	44	0
Liverpool	1963–64	First Division	36	1	5	0	0	0	0	0	0	0	41	1
Liverpool	1964–65	First Division	35	0	8	0	0	0	9	1	1	0	53	1
Liverpool	1965–66	First Division	42	2	1	0	0	0	9	0	1	0	53	2
Liverpool	1966–67	First Division	40	2	4	0	0	0	5	0	1	0	50	2
Liverpool	1967–68	First Division	38	2	9	0	2	0	6	1	0	0	55	3
Liverpool	1968–69	First Division	39	2	4	0	3	0	2	0	0	0	48	2
Liverpool	1969–70	First Division	37	3	6	0	2	0	3	0	0	0	48	3
Liverpool	1970–71	First Division	12	1	2	0	0	0	2	0	0	0	16	1
Liverpool	Total		358	13	50	0	7	0	36	2	3	0	454	15
Tranmere Rovers	1971–72	Third Division	19	2	4	0	0	0	–		0	0	23	2
Tranmere Rovers	1972–73	Third Division	42	1	2	0	1	0	–		0	0	45	1
Tranmere Rovers	1973–74	Third Division	36	2	2	0	4	0	–		0	0	42	2
Tranmere Rovers	Total		97	5	8	0	5	0	0	0	0	0	110	5
Formby	1977–78		10	0	3	0	0	0	–		2	0	15	0
Career total			560	19	70	0	26	0	36	2	5	0	697	21

== Honours ==
Dundee United

- Scottish Division Two promotion: 1959–60

Liverpool

- Football League First Division: 1963–64, 1965–66
- Football League Second Division: 1961–62
- FA Cup: 1964–65
- FA Charity Shield: 1964, 1965, 1966

L.A. Skyhawks

- American Soccer League: 1975–76
