= Bobby Thomson (footballer, born 1939) =

Scottish footballer

Personal information
- Date of birth: 21 November 1939 (age 86)
- Place of birth: Menstrie, Scotland
- Position: Full back

Youth career
- Sauchie

Senior career*
Years	Team	Apps	(Gls)
1957–1962	Partick Thistle	3	(0)
1962–1965	Liverpool	6	(0)
1965–1967	Luton Town	74	(0)
Total		83	(0)
- * Club domestic league appearances and goals

Robert "Bobby" Thomson (born 21 November 1939) is a Scottish former footballer who played as a defender. He played first played for Partick Thistle, joining Liverpool in December 1965 for £7,000. He made just six league appearances before joining Luton Town in August 1965 and later emigrated to Australia.
