= Jim Furnell =

English footballer (born 1937)

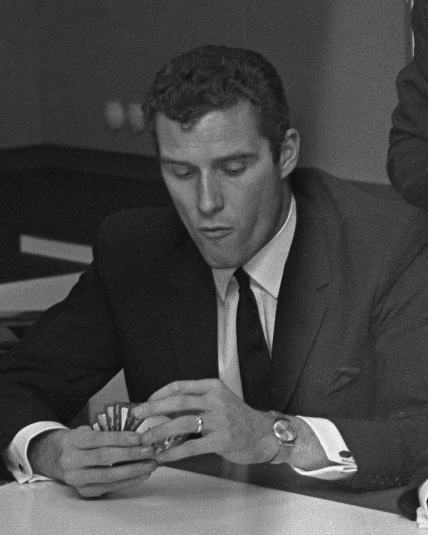
- Furnell in November 1967

Personal information
- Full name: James Furnell
- Date of birth: 23 November 1937 (age 88)
- Place of birth: Clitheroe, England
- Height: 6 ft 2 in (1.88 m)
- Position: Goalkeeper

Senior career*
Years	Team	Apps	(Gls)
1954–1962	Burnley	2	(0)
1962–1963	Liverpool	28	(0)
1963–1968	Arsenal	141	(0)
1968–1970	Rotherham United	76	(0)
1970–1976	Plymouth Argyle	183	(0)
Total		430	(0)
- * Club domestic league appearances and goals

James Furnell (born 23 November 1937 in Clitheroe, Lancashire) is an English former footballer, who played as a goalkeeper.

== Career ==
Furnell started his career at his local club Burnley, signing at the age of 17. As third-choice keeper he only played twice in eight seasons at Turf Moor, before being signed by Liverpool in February 1962. Furnell immediately took the No. 1 jersey at Liverpool, playing all 13 of the club's remaining matches that seasons, as they won a Second Division title and promotion to the First Division. However, after breaking his finger in a training ground accident early in the 1962-63 season, he lost his place to Tommy Lawrence. He played two matches in 1963-64 before being sold to Arsenal for £15,000 in November 1963.

Furnell immediately slotted into the Arsenal first team, making his debut the day after he signed, on 23 November 1963 against Blackpool; the match finished 5–3 to Arsenal. Furnell went on to become the long-term successor to Jack Kelsey, playing as Arsenal's No. 1 for the next five seasons (aside from 1964-65, when he shared the spot with Tony Burns). Under manager Billy Wright, however, Arsenal struggled to make an impact in either the League or the Cups.

With the promotion of Bertie Mee to manager in 1966, Arsenal's form began to pick up, although Furnell didn't stay at the club long enough to enjoy it. Although he played in the 1967-68 League Cup Final against Leeds United (which Arsenal lost 1–0), in the following match, an FA Cup tie against Birmingham City, he made an error which let in Birmingham's equaliser. He was dropped with Bob Wilson taking his place, and never played for the Arsenal first team again.

He was sold in September 1968 for £8,000 to Rotherham United; he had played 167 matches for Arsenal in total. After two years with Rotherham he moved to Plymouth Argyle in 1970. He played for five and a half years for Plymouth before his retirement in the summer of 1976. As part of the club's centenary in 2003, Furnell was named as goalkeeper in the Pilgrims' all-time greatest XI by the club's fans.

After retiring as a player, he was a coach at Plymouth before joining Blackburn Rovers in 1981; he served as a coach there until his retirement in 1998.

In a 2007 web poll, Furnell was named Plymouth's best goalkeeper of all time.

== Honours ==
Arsenal

- Football League Cup runner-up: 1967–68
