= Ian St John =

Scottish footballer and manager (1938–2021)

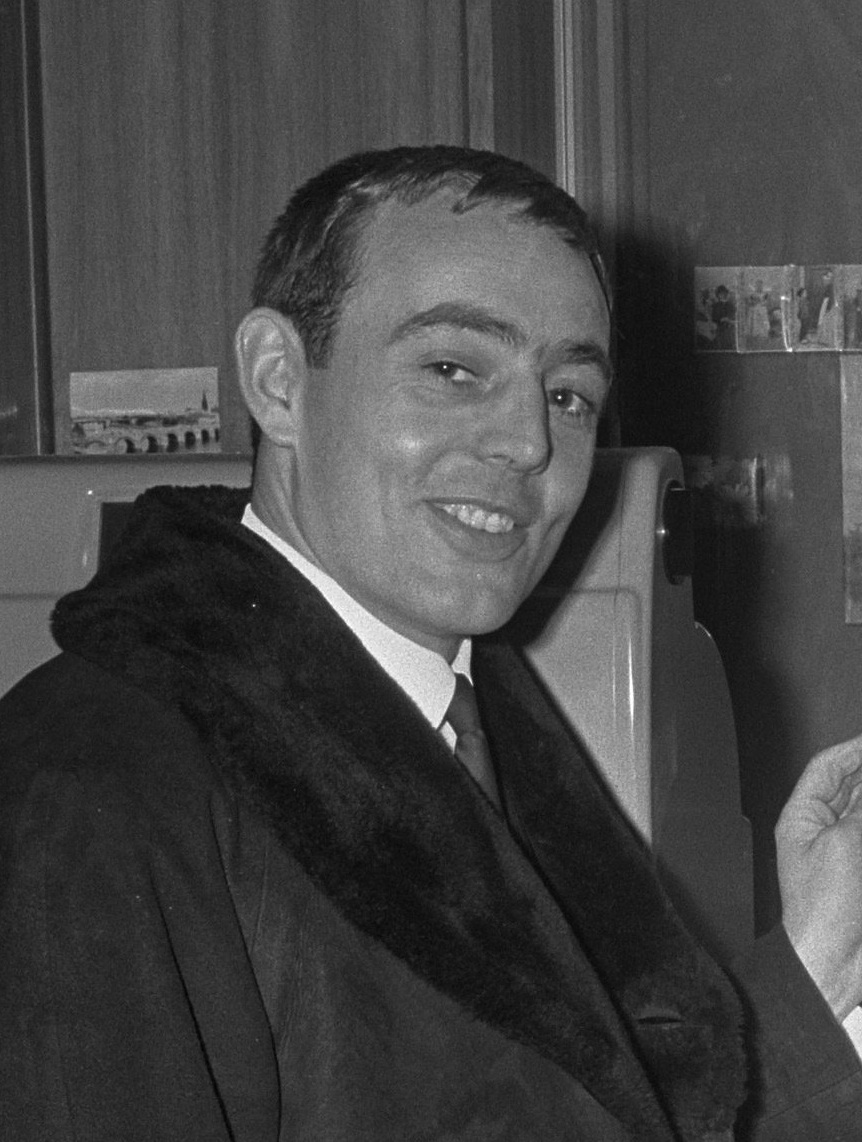
- St John in 1966

Personal information
- Full name: John St John
- Date of birth: 7 June 1938
- Place of birth: Motherwell, Lanarkshire, Scotland
- Date of death: 1 March 2021 (aged 82)
- Place of death: Arrowe Park, Merseyside, England
- Position: Forward

Youth career
- Motherwell Bridge Works
- 1955–1956: North Motherwell Athletic

Senior career*
Years	Team	Apps	(Gls)
1956–1961	Motherwell	113	(80)
1956–1957	→ Douglas Water Thistle (loan)		
1961–1971	Liverpool	336	(95)
1971	Hellenic	23	(4)
1971–1972	Coventry City	18	(3)
1972	Cape Town City		
1972–1973	Tranmere Rovers	9	(1)
Total		489	(183)

International career
1959–1965	Scotland	21	(9)
1959–1961	Scottish League XI	4	(6)
1960	SFL trial v SFA	1	(0)
1960	Scotland U23	2	(2)
1962	SFA trial v SFL	1	(0)

Managerial career
- 1973–1974: Motherwell
- 1974–1977: Portsmouth
- * Club domestic league appearances and goals

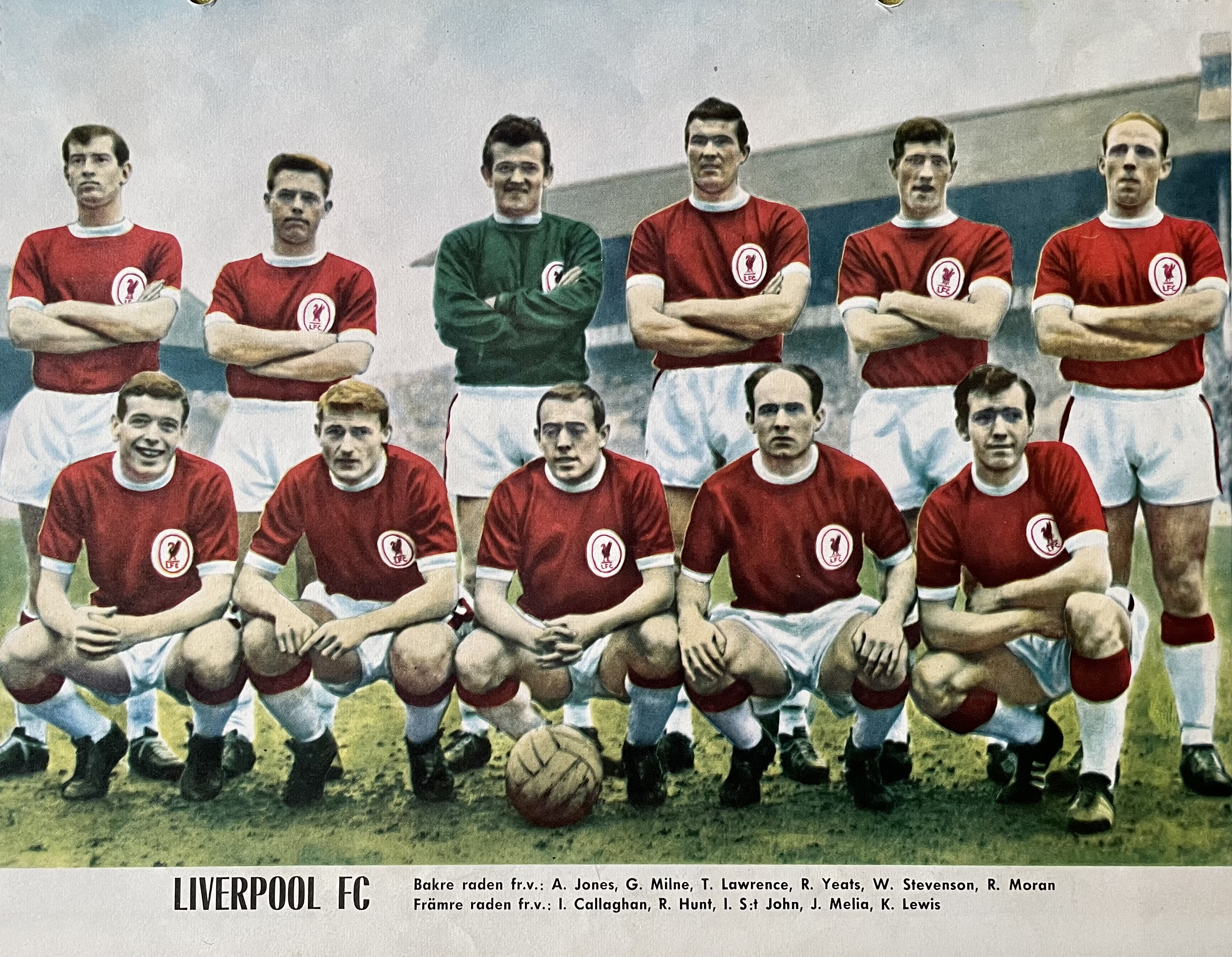
Liverpool F.C. at 1963 with following players, from left standing: Allan Jones, Gordon Milne, Tommy Lawrence, Ron Yeats (captain), Willie Stevenson, Ronnie Moran; front row: Ian Callaghan, Roger Hunt, Ian St John, Jimmy Melia and Kevin Lewis.

John "Ian" St John (/sɪntˈdʒɒn/; 7 June 1938 – 1 March 2021) was a Scottish professional football player, coach and broadcaster. St John played as a forward for Liverpool throughout most of the 1960s. Signed by Bill Shankly in 1961, St John was a key member of the Liverpool team that emerged from the second tier of English football to win two league titles and one FA Cup—in which he scored the winner in the 1965 final—to cement a position as one of the country's top sides. He played for Scotland 21 times, scoring nine goals.

He later became a manager – including at his hometown team Motherwell where he had begun his playing career – and a media pundit. He co-presented the topical football show Saint and Greavsie with Jimmy Greaves from 1985 to 1992. In 2008, he was inducted into the Scottish Football Hall of Fame.

== Career ==
=== Motherwell ===
St John was one of six children. Their father, Alex, a steelworker, died when Ian was six years old. Ian also showed talent for boxing as a boy, but his mother discouraged it. Having played football for youth sides and works teams as a teenager while working in local industry, including at the Colville steelworks, St John began his career at boyhood favourites Motherwell, signing as a professional in 1957 after a spell with affiliated junior team Douglas Water Thistle as a provisional signing; he continued a part-time engineering apprenticeship (work which he admitted he disliked and actively avoided as much as possible) for a further two years.

He was managed by Bobby Ancell, and was part of a group of talented young players (also including Andy Weir, Willie Hunter, Pat Quinn and Sammy Reid) that were nicknamed the "Ancell Babes". His debut was against Dumfries side Queen of the South in an away fixture at Palmerston Park. St John scored a hat-trick for Motherwell in two minutes and 30 seconds against Hibernian in 1959, one of the fastest recorded in Scottish football history. He left Motherwell in 1961, having scored 105 goals in 144 appearances for the club in the three major Scottish domestic competitions.

=== Liverpool ===
On 2 May 1961 he was transferred to Liverpool for a transfer fee of £37,500, (equivalent to £700,000 in 2025) setting a new club record. He was brought to the club by manager Bill Shankly, who was preparing for the 1961–62 season with the club still in the Second Division. Many years later, after Shankly's retirement as manager, he described St John's arrival at the club – along with that of Ron Yeats during the same summer – as the "turning point" for the club as they began their transformation into one of Europe's top footballing sides.

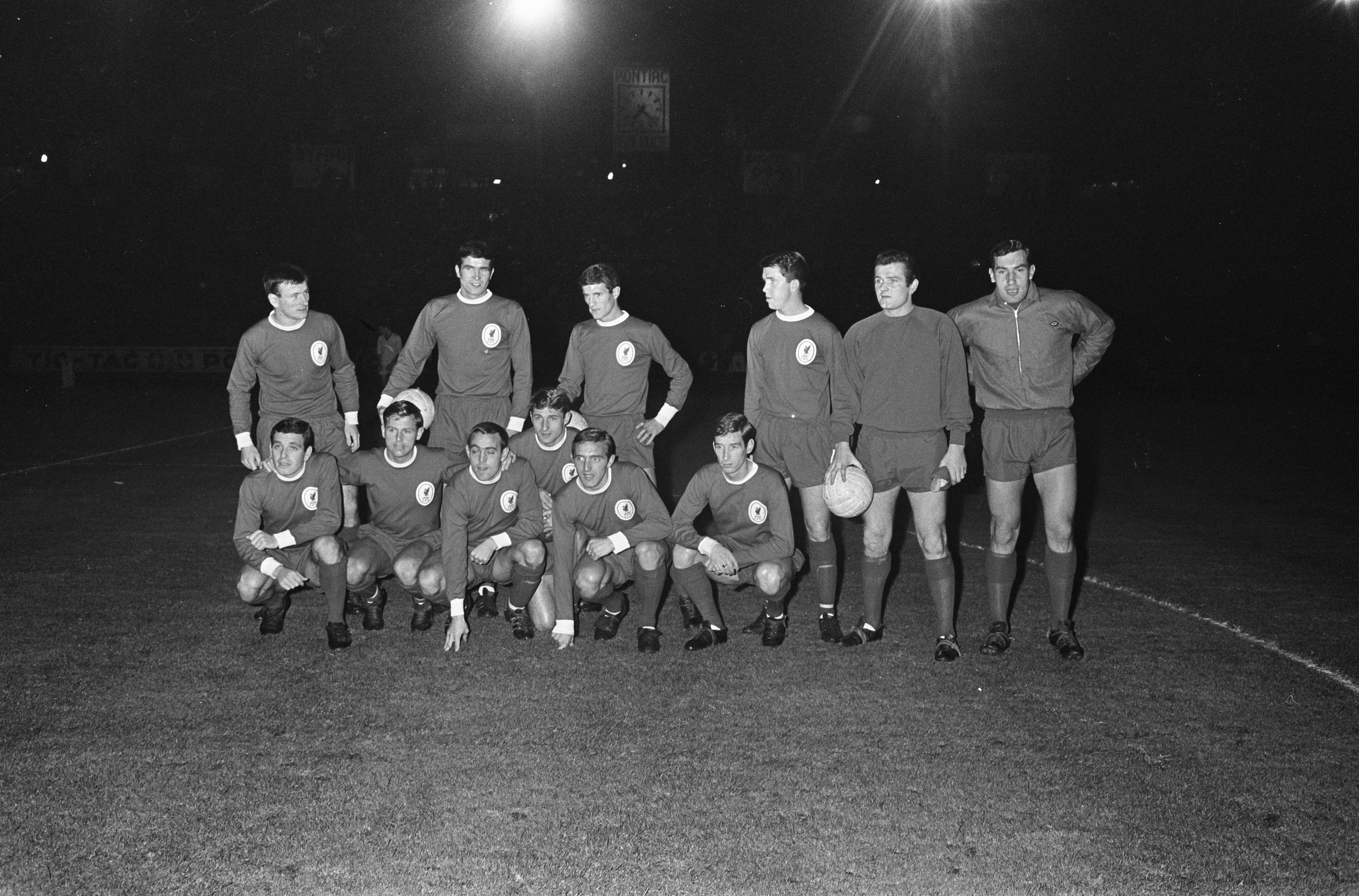
Liverpool team, including Ian St John, before their 1966–67 European Cup first-round, second-leg match.

St John made his debut for Liverpool in the Merseyside derby against Everton in the Liverpool Senior Cup. Although Liverpool lost 4–3, he announced his arrival in spectacular style by scoring all three of his side's goals. He scored a total of 18 goals in his first season for Liverpool, and played in all but two matches. His official debut came in a 2–0 league victory against Bristol Rovers at the Eastville Stadium on 19 August 1961, and his first official goals came 11 days later when he scored twice in a 4–1 win over Sunderland at Roker Park. His strike partner Roger Hunt got the other two goals.

Along with Ron Yeats, St John was brought in to turn around Liverpool's luck as they had been stuck in the Second Division for seven years, narrowly missing out on promotion in six of those seasons. The purchases paid dividends as Liverpool comfortably won the Second Division title by eight points over nearest challengers Leyton Orient. St John played 40 times that season and scored 18 goals. They finished in a respectable 8th place in their first season back in the top flight, 1962–63, and also reached the FA Cup semi-finals.

Liverpool then produced a surprise by winning the league championship in 1963–64, overturning a 17-point deficit to win the title by four points over Manchester United and five over reigning champions Everton, St John played a major role in the title success by scoring 21 goals, which was his highest total in a season for the club. His most important goal for Liverpool came a year later, a diving header past Leeds goalkeeper Gary Sprake in extra time of the 1965 FA Cup Final. This goal won the FA Cup for Liverpool, the first time in the club's history that it had won the trophy.

Another league championship followed in the 1965–66 season, as Liverpool finished six points clear of Leeds. St John chipped in with 10 goals from 41 outings. Liverpool also reached their first European final, as Borussia Dortmund beat them 2–1 in the 1966 European Cup Winners' Cup Final at Hampden Park.

Like the vast majority of Bill Shankly's first great team, St John was at his peak during the mid-1960s. He continued to play regularly during the later 1960s, mainly playing in a deeper position. As he entered his thirties his form and fitness began to dip, and he was eventually dropped from the team by Shankly. St John was a reserve team player in 1970–71, and he left Liverpool on 25 August 1971, after playing 425 games and scoring 118 goals for the club.

=== Coventry City and Tranmere Rovers ===
St John played for South African club Hellenic during the middle of 1971. After his return to England in August 1971, he was transferred to Coventry City. After a short spell with Tranmere Rovers, then managed by Ron Yeats, he retired from playing football in 1973.

=== International career ===
St John was selected to play for Scotland 21 times, making his debut in a 3–2 friendly victory against West Germany at Hampden Park on 6 May 1959. The first of his 9 international goals came a year later, again at Hampden, but this time in a 3–2 friendly defeat at the hands of Poland on 4 May 1960. He scored twice in a 1962 FIFA World Cup qualification playoff match against Czechoslovakia in November 1961, but Scotland lost 4–2 after extra time and did not qualify for the World Cup finals.

== After playing ==
After retiring from playing, St John managed both his former club Motherwell (1973–1974) and Portsmouth (1974–1977, assisted by former Motherwell teammate Willie Hunter). He also served as assistant manager at Sheffield Wednesday and Coventry City. As Motherwell manager, St John sold goalkeeper Keith MacRae and gave a debut to young forward Willie Pettigrew. Motherwell finished ninth in the 1973–74 season, his only term in charge.

After leaving Sheffield Wednesday in 1979, St John became a football pundit. He struck up a successful TV partnership with fellow ex-footballer Jimmy Greaves, with their Saint and Greavsie programme running from 1985 until 1992. He also set up several football academies for the coaching of younger players called the Ian St John Soccer Camps. Liverpool twice ran a fan poll of their favourite Liverpool players, "100 Players Who Shook The Kop"; St John finished 21st in 2006 and 33rd in 2013.

== Illness and death ==
In June 2014, St John announced that he had undergone surgery for bladder cancer in April of that year, removing his bladder and prostate gland. He died on 1 March 2021 at Arrowe Park Hospital after a long illness, aged 82.

== International career statistics ==
Appearances and goals by national team and year
National team	Year	Apps	Goals
Scotland	1959	3	0
Scotland	1960	3	1
Scotland	1961	5	5
Scotland	1962	4	0
Scotland	1963	5	2
Scotland	1964	—	
Scotland	1965	1	1
Total		21	9

Scores and results list Scotland's goal tally first, score column indicates score after each St John goal.

List of international goals scored by Ian St John
No.	Date	Venue	Cap	Opponent	Score	Result	Competition
1	4 May 1960	Hampden Park, Glasgow	5	Poland	2–2	2–3	Friendly match
2	26 September 1961	Hampden Park, Glasgow	8	Czechoslovakia	1–1	3–2	1962 FIFA World Cup qualification
3	8 November 1961	Hampden Park, Glasgow	10	Wales	1–0	2–0	1961–62 British Home Championship
4	8 November 1961	Hampden Park, Glasgow	10	Wales	2–0	2–0	1961–62 British Home Championship
5	29 November 1961	Stade Heysel, Brussels	11	Czechoslovakia	1–0	2–4	1962 FIFA World Cup qualification
6	29 November 1961	Stade Heysel, Brussels	11	Czechoslovakia	2–1	2–4	1962 FIFA World Cup qualification
7	13 June 1963	Estadio Santiago Bernabéu, Madrid	19	Spain	6–2	6–2	Friendly match
8	12 October 1963	Windsor Park, Belfast	20	Northern Ireland	1–1	1–2	1963–64 British Home Championship
9	10 April 1965	Wembley Stadium, London	21	England	2–2	2–2	1964–65 British Home Championship

== Honours ==
Liverpool

- Football League First Division: 1963–64, 1965–66
- Football League Second Division: 1961–62
- FA Cup: 1964–65
- FA Charity Shield: 1964, 1965, 1966
- European Cup Winners' Cup: runner-up 1965–66

Individual

- Scottish Football Hall of Fame inductee: 2008
