= Phil Ferns =

English footballer

Personal information
- Full name: Philip David Ferns
- Date of birth: 12 September 1961 (age 65)
- Place of birth: Liverpool, England
- Position: Left-back

Senior career*
Years	Team	Apps	(Gls)
1978–1981	Bournemouth	95	(6)
1981–1983	Charlton Athletic	38	(1)
1982–1983	→ Wimbledon (loan)	7	(0)
1983–1985	Blackpool	46	(0)
1985–1986	Aldershot	24	(2)
	Yeovil Town	?	(?)
1994–1995	Trowbridge Town	?	(?)
Total		210	(9)
- * Club domestic league appearances and goals

Philip David Ferns (born 12 September 1961) is an English former professional footballer who played as a left back in the Football League.

== Blackpool ==
Liverpool-born Ferns signed for Sam Ellis's Blackpool, who were then in the Fourth Division, in the summer of 1983. His father, also called Phil, played 18 times for Liverpool F.C. in their 1963-64 title winning season. He made his debut for the Tangerines in the opening League game of the 1983-84 campaign, a single-goal victory over Reading at Bloomfield Road. He went on to make a further 36 starts and one substitute appearance.

The following season, 1984-85, he made six starts and two substitute appearances as Blackpool finished runners-up and won promotion to Division Three. His final appearance for the Seasiders came on 23 February, a 1–0 victory at home to Southend United.

After retiring from professional football, Ferns became a police officer with Hampshire Constabulary, and then later Dorset Police.
