= Allan Jones (footballer, born 1940) =

Welsh footballer

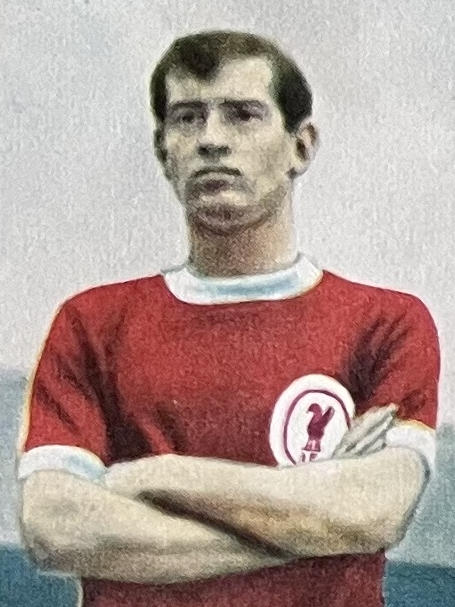
- Jones while a Liverpool player.

Personal information
- Full name: Allan Powell Jones
- Date of birth: 6 January 1940
- Place of birth: Flint, Wales
- Date of death: September 1993 (aged 53)
- Place of death: Ealing, England
- Height: 5 ft 10 in (1.78 m)
- Position: Full back

Youth career
- 1955–1957: Liverpool

Senior career*
Years	Team	Apps	(Gls)
1957–1963	Liverpool	5	(0)
1963–1970	Brentford	249	(3)
1970–1972	Croatia		

International career
- Wales Schoolboys
- * Club domestic league appearances and goals

Allan Powell Jones (6 January 1940 – September 1993) was a Welsh professional footballer who played as a full back. He is best remembered for the seven years he spent in the Football League with Brentford, for whom he made 280 appearances in all competitions. Jones was posthumously inducted into the Brentford Hall of Fame in 2015.

== Career ==
=== Liverpool ===
Jones began his career at Second Division club Liverpool, joining as an amateur in April 1955. After two years in the youth team, Jones signed a professional contract in April 1957. He had to wait until 19 December 1959 to make his first team debut, when he deputised for John Molyneux in a 4–0 victory over Cardiff City, a match also notable for the fact that it was Bill Shankly's first in management at Anfield. Jones went on to make only four further appearances for Liverpool (all in April 1963) and he departed the club in August 1963.

=== Brentford ===
Jones transferred to newly-promoted Third Division club Brentford for a £5,000 fee in August 1963. He became an integral part of the team at left back and made 55 appearances during the 1963–64 season. Jones took over the right back position when Ken Coote retired in 1964. Despite being placed on the transfer list at his own request in August 1966, he averaged 35 league appearances per season until 1969–70, when he made only 13 appearances in all competitions, mostly in a utility role. He departed Griffin Park at the end of the 1969–70 season and made 281 appearances and scored three goals in seven seasons with the club. Jones was posthumously inducted into the Brentford Hall of Fame in 2015.

=== Croatia ===
Jones signed a two-year contract with Australian club Croatia in 1970.

== International career ==
Jones played for Wales Schoolboys and his mid-1960s performances for Brentford drew the attention of the senior selectors, but he failed to win a call into a squad.

== Career statistics ==
Appearances and goals by club, season and competition
Club	Season	League			FA Cup		League Cup		Total	
Club	Season	Division	Apps	Goals	Apps	Goals	Apps	Goals	Apps	Goals
Liverpool	1959–60	Second Division	1	0	0	0	―		1	0
Liverpool	1962–63	First Division	4	0	0	0	0	0	4	0
Liverpool	Total		5	0	0	0	0	0	5	0
Brentford	1963–64	Third Division	45	1	6	0	4	0	55	1
Brentford	1964–65	Third Division	37	0	4	0	1	0	42	0
Brentford	1965–66	Third Division	44	0	2	0	2	0	48	0
Brentford	1966–67	Fourth Division	23	1	4	0	0	0	27	1
Brentford	1967–68	Fourth Division	43	1	2	0	1	0	46	1
Brentford	1968–69	Fourth Division	45	0	2	0	3	0	50	0
Brentford	1969–70	Fourth Division	12	0	1	0	0	0	13	0
Brentford	Total		249	3	21	0	11	0	281	3
Career total			254	3	21	0	11	0	286	3

== Honours ==
Brentford

- London Challenge Cup: 1966–67

Individual

- Brentford Hall of Fame
