= 1965–66 Liverpool F.C. season =

English football club season

Liverpool F.C.
1965–66 season
- Manager: Bill Shankly
- First Division: Winners
- Cup Winners' Cup: Runners-up
- FA Cup: Third round
- FA Charity Shield: Shared
- Top goalscorer: League: Roger Hunt (29); All: Roger Hunt (32)
| Home colours | Away colours |

The 1965–66 season was Liverpool Football Club's 74th season in existence and their fourth consecutive season in the First Division. Liverpool F.C. won its seventh league title, tying Arsenal's record, with a six-point cushion to Leeds and Burnley. Roger Hunt scored 29 league goals, which earned him a place in the England squad for the World Cup, where he became the first player to win the World Cup representing Liverpool. It was not until 44 years later that Fernando Torres played an active part in the Spanish team winning the World Cup as a Liverpool player.

The season also saw Liverpool reaching its first European final, that of the Cup Winners Cup, losing 2-1 to West German side Borussia Dortmund at Hampden Park in Glasgow, a severe blow to manager Bill Shankly, who had hoped to win his first European trophy in his native Scotland.

The club permanently adopted an all red strip at the start of this season.

== Squad ==
=== Goalkeepers ===
- (Scotland) Tommy Lawrence
- (England) William Molyneux

=== Defenders ===
- (England) Gerry Byrne
- (England) Chris Lawler
- (England) Thomas Lowry
- (England) Tommy Smith
- (Scotland) Ron Yeats

=== Midfielders ===
- (England) Alf Arrowsmith
- (England) Ian Callaghan
- (England) Gordon Milne
- (Scotland) Willie Stevenson
- (Scotland) Ian St. John
- (Scotland) Gordon Wallace
- (England) Peter Thompson

=== Attackers ===
- (England) Phil Chisnall
- (Scotland) Bobby Graham
- (England) Roger Hunt
- (England) Geoff Strong

== Squad statistics ==
=== Appearances and goals ===
| No. | Pos | Nat | Player | Total | | Division 1 | | FA Cup | | Charity Shield | | European CWC | |
| No. | Pos | Nat | Player | Apps | Goals | Apps | Goals | Apps | Goals | Apps | Goals | Apps | Goals |
|---|---|---|---|---|---|---|---|---|---|---|---|---|---|
| | FW | (England) ENG | Alf Arrowsmith | 6 | 1 | 3+2 | 1 | 0+0 | 0 | 0+0 | 0 | 1+0 | 0 |
| | DF | (England) ENG | Gerry Byrne | 53 | 1 | 42+0 | 1 | 1+0 | 0 | 1+0 | 0 | 9+0 | 0 |
| | MF | (England) ENG | Ian Callaghan | 53 | 5 | 42+0 | 5 | 1+0 | 0 | 1+0 | 0 | 9+0 | 0 |
| | FW | (England) ENG | Phil Chisnall | 1 | 0 | 0+0 | 0 | 0+0 | 0 | 0+0 | 0 | 1+0 | 0 |
| | FW | (Scotland) SCO | Bobby Graham | 1 | 0 | 1+0 | 0 | 0+0 | 0 | 0+0 | 0 | 0+0 | 0 |
| | FW | (England) ENG | Roger Hunt | 46 | 31 | 37+0 | 29 | 1+0 | 1 | 1+0 | 0 | 7+0 | 1 |
| | DF | (England) ENG | Chris Lawler | 50 | 9 | 40+0 | 5 | 1+0 | 0 | 1+0 | 0 | 8+0 | 4 |
| | GK | (Scotland) SCO | Tommy Lawrence | 53 | 0 | 42+0 | 0 | 1+0 | 0 | 1+0 | 0 | 9+0 | 0 |
| | MF | (England) ENG | Gordon Milne | 36 | 7 | 28+0 | 7 | 1+0 | 0 | 1+0 | 0 | 6+0 | 0 |
| | DF | (England) ENG | Tommy Smith | 53 | 4 | 42+0 | 3 | 1+0 | 0 | 1+0 | 0 | 9+0 | 1 |
| | FW | (Scotland) SCO | Ian St John | 52 | 12 | 41+0 | 10 | 1+0 | 0 | 1+0 | 0 | 9+0 | 2 |
| | MF | (Scotland) SCO | Willie Stevenson | 52 | 6 | 41+0 | 5 | 1+0 | 0 | 1+0 | 1 | 9+0 | 0 |
| | FW | (England) ENG | Geoff Strong | 27 | 7 | 21+1 | 5 | 0+0 | 0 | 1+0 | 0 | 4+0 | 2 |
| | MF | (England) ENG | Peter Thompson | 50 | 6 | 40+0 | 5 | 1+0 | 0 | 0+0 | 0 | 9+0 | 1 |
| | DF | (Scotland) SCO | Ron Yeats | 53 | 3 | 42+0 | 2 | 1+0 | 0 | 1+0 | 1 | 9+0 | 0 |

== First Division ==
=== Table ===
| Pos | Team | Pld | W | D | L | GF | GA | GAv | Pts | Qualification or relegation |
|---|---|---|---|---|---|---|---|---|---|---|
| 1 | Liverpool (C) | 42 | 26 | 9 | 7 | 79 | 34 | 2.324 | 61 | Qualification for the European Cup first round |
| 2 | Leeds United | 42 | 23 | 9 | 10 | 79 | 38 | 2.079 | 55 | Qualification for the Inter-Cities Fairs Cup second round |
| 3 | Burnley | 42 | 24 | 7 | 11 | 79 | 47 | 1.681 | 55 | Qualification for the Inter-Cities Fairs Cup first round |
| 4 | Manchester United | 42 | 18 | 15 | 9 | 84 | 59 | 1.424 | 51 | |
| 5 | Chelsea | 42 | 22 | 7 | 13 | 65 | 53 | 1.226 | 51 | |

Source: World Football
Rules for classification: 1) Points; 2) Goal average; 3) Goals scored
(C) Champions

=== Matches ===
| Date | Opponents | Venue | Result | Scorers | Attendance | Report 1 | Report 2 |
|---|---|---|---|---|---|---|---|
| 21-Aug-65 | Leicester City | A | 3–1 | Hunt 35', 80' Strong 53' | 29,696 | Report | Report |
| 25-Aug-65 | Sheffield United | H | 0–1 | | 47,259 | Report | Report |
| 01-Sep-65 | Sheffield United | A | 0–0 | | 20,798 | Report | Report |
| 04-Sep-65 | Blackpool | A | 3–2 | Hunt 25', 58' Callaghan 75' | 25,616 | Report | Report |
| 06-Sep-65 | West Ham United | A | 5–1 | Milne 12' Callaghan 26' Hunt 43', 43', 50' | 32,144 | Report | Report |
| 11-Sep-65 | Fulham | H | 2–1 | Lawler 6' Hunt 60' | 46,382 | Report | Report |
| 15-Sep-65 | West Ham United | H | 1–1 | Strong 76' | 44,397 | Report | Report |
| 18-Sep-65 | Tottenham Hotspur | A | 1–2 | Strong 80' | 46,770 | Report | Report |
| 25-Sep-65 | Everton | H | 5–0 | Smith 34' Hunt 49', 73' Stevenson 52' St. John 89' | 53,557 | Report | Report |
| 02-Oct-65 | Aston Villa | H | 3–1 | Thompson 12', 56' St. John 89' | 43,859 | Report | Report |
| 09-Oct-65 | Manchester United | A | 0–2 | | 58,161 | Report | Report |
| 16-Oct-65 | Newcastle United | H | 2–0 | Hunt 26' Callaghan 41' | 47,984 | Report | Report |
| 23-Oct-65 | West Bromwich Albion | A | 0–3 | | 30,000 | Report | Report |
| 30-Oct-65 | Nottingham Forest | H | 4–0 | Stevenson 49' (pen.) Hunt 72', 83' St. John 89' | 38,420 | Report | Report |
| 06-Nov-65 | Sheffield Wednesday | A | 2–0 | Hunt 74' Thompson 83' | 24,456 | Report | Report |
| 13-Nov-65 | Northampton Town | H | 5–0 | St. John 6' Stevenson 17' (pen.) Hunt 32' Callaghan 63' Thompson 65' | 41,904 | Report | Report |
| 17-Nov-65 | Blackburn Rovers | H | 5–2 | Stevenson 17' (pen.) St. John 32', 87' Hunt 45' Smith 83' | 36,450 | Report | Report |
| 20-Nov-65 | Stoke City | A | 0–0 | | 28,622 | Report | Report |
| 27-Nov-65 | Burnley | H | 2–1 | Hunt 45' Milne 61' | 50,282 | Report | Report |
| 04-Dec-65 | Chelsea | A | 1–0 | Hunt 73' | 36,839 | Report | Report |
| 11-Dec-65 | Arsenal | H | 4–2 | Thompson 30' St. John 51' Strong 70' Hunt 80' | 43,727 | Report | Report |
| 18-Dec-65 | Newcastle United | A | 0–0 | | 42,910 | Report | Report |
| 27-Dec-65 | Leeds United | H | 0–1 | | 53,430 | Report | Report |
| 28-Dec-65 | Leeds United | A | 1–0 | Milne 48' | 49,192 | Report | Report |
| 01-Jan-66 | Manchester United | H | 2–1 | Smith 39' Milne 88' | 53,970 | Report | Report |
| 08-Jan-66 | Arsenal | A | 1–0 | Yeats 87' | 43,917 | Report | Report |
| 15-Jan-66 | West Bromwich Albion | H | 2–2 | Milne 37' Byrne 44' | 46,687 | Report | Report |
| 29-Jan-66 | Leicester City | H | 1–0 | Lawler 75' | 45,409 | Report | Report |
| 05-Feb-66 | Blackburn Rovers | A | 4–1 | Lawler 25' Hunt 43' St. John 63', 76' | 30,414 | Report | Report |
| 12-Feb-66 | Sunderland | H | 4–0 | Hunt 46', 52', 64' Yeats 59' | 43,859 | Report | Report |
| 19-Feb-66 | Blackpool | H | 4–1 | Hunt 28', 80' Arrowsmith 40' Milne 48' | 45,046 | Report | Report |
| 26-Feb-66 | Fulham | A | 0–2 | | 31,626 | Report | Report |
| 12-Mar-66 | Tottenham Hotspur | H | 1–0 | Own goal 65' | 50,760 | Report | Report |
| 19-Mar-66 | Everton | A | 0–0 | | 62,537 | Report | Report |
| 26-Mar-66 | Aston Villa | A | 3–0 | Hunt 42', 62' Callaghan 49' | 23,625 | Report | Report |
| 06-Apr-66 | Sheffield Wednesday | H | 1–0 | Stevenson 23' | 44,792 | Report | Report |
| 09-Apr-66 | Northampton Town | A | 0–0 | | 20,029 | Report | Report |
| 11-Apr-66 | Sunderland | A | 2–2 | Lawler 1', 24' | 38,355 | Report | Report |
| 16-Apr-66 | Stoke City | H | 2–0 | Strong 31' St. John 78' | 41,106 | Report | Report |
| 23-Apr-66 | Burnley | A | 0–2 | | 36,741 | Report | Report |
| 30-Apr-66 | Chelsea | H | 2–1 | Hunt 48', 69' | 53,754 | Report | Report |
| 10-May-66 | Nottingham Forest | A | 1–1 | Milne 60' | 22,105 | Report | Report |

=== FA Charity Shield ===
14 August 1965
15:00 BST

| Manchester United | 2–2 | Liverpool |
|---|---|---|
| Best 28'; Herd 81' | Report; Report | Stevenson 38'; Yeats 86' |

Old Trafford, Manchester
Attendance: 48,502
Referee: Jim Finney

| GK | 1 | (Republic of Ireland) Pat Dunne |
| RB | 2 | (Republic of Ireland) Shay Brennan |
| LB | 3 | (Republic of Ireland) Tony Dunne |
| RH | 4 | (Scotland) Paddy Crerand |
| CH | 5 | (Republic of Ireland) Noel Cantwell (c) |
| LH | 6 | (England) Nobby Stiles |
| OR | 7 | (Northern Ireland) George Best |
| IR | 8 | (England) Bobby Charlton |
| CF | 9 | (Scotland) David Herd |
| IL | 10 | (Scotland) Denis Law |
| OL | 11 | (England) John Aston, Jr. |
Substitutes:
| FW | 12 | (England) Willie Anderson | Substituted on |
Manager:
(Scotland) Matt Busby

| GK | 1 | (Scotland) Tommy Lawrence |
| RB | 2 | (England) Chris Lawler |
| LB | 3 | (England) Gerry Byrne |
| RH | 4 | (England) Gordon Milne |
| CH | 5 | (Scotland) Ron Yeats (c) |
| LH | 6 | (Scotland) Willie Stevenson |
| OR | 7 | (England) Ian Callaghan |
| IR | 8 | (England) Roger Hunt |
| CF | 9 | (Scotland) Ian St. John |
| IL | 10 | (England) Tommy Smith |
| OL | 11 | (England) Geoff Strong |
Manager:
(Scotland) Bill Shankly

Match rules

- 90 minutes, no extra time
- One named substitute
- Maximum of one substitution

=== FA Cup ===
| Date | Opponents | Venue | Result | Scorers | Attendance | Report 1 | Report 2 |
|---|---|---|---|---|---|---|---|
| 22-Jan-66 | Chelsea | H | 1–2 | Hunt 2' | 54,097 | Report | Report |

=== European Cup Winners Cup ===
| Date | Opponents | Venue | Result | Scorers | Attendance | Report 1 | Report 2 |
|---|---|---|---|---|---|---|---|
| 29-Sep-65 | Juventus | A | 0–1 | | 9,242 | Report | Report |
| 13-Oct-65 | Juventus | H | 2–0 | Lawler 19' Strong 24' | 51,055 | Report | Report |
| 01-Dec-65 | Standard Liège | H | 3–1 | Lawler 2', 49' Thompson 72' | 46,112 | Report | Report |
| 15-Dec-65 | Standard Liège | A | 2–1 | Hunt 51' St. John 57' | 29,534 | Report | Report |
| 01-Mar-66 | Honvéd | A | 0–0 | | 16,163 | Report | Report |
| 08-Mar-66 | Honvéd | H | 2–0 | Lawler 28' St. John 47' | 54,631 | Report | Report |
| 14-Apr-66 | Celtic | A | 0–1 | | 76,446 | Report | Report |
| 19-Apr-66 | Celtic | H | 2–0 | Smith 61' Strong 67' | 54,208 | Report | Report |

Final

5 May 1966
19:30 BST

| Borussia Dortmund (West Germany) | 2–1 (a.e.t.) | (England) Liverpool |
|---|---|---|
| Held 61'; Libuda 107' | Report; Report | Hunt 68' |

Hampden Park, Glasgow
Attendance: 41,657
Referee: Pierre Schwinte (France)

| Borussia Dortmund | Liverpool |

| GK | 1 | (West Germany) Hans Tilkowski |
| RB | 2 | (West Germany) Gerhard Cyliax |
| LB | 3 | (West Germany) Theodor Redder |
| MF | 4 | (West Germany) Dieter Kurrat |
| CB | 5 | (West Germany) Wolfgang Paul (c) |
| MF | 6 | (West Germany) Rudi Assauer |
| RW | 7 | (West Germany) Reinhard Libuda |
| IN | 8 | (West Germany) Aki Schmidt |
| CF | 9 | (West Germany) Sigfried Held |
| IN | 10 | (West Germany) Wilhelm Sturm |
| LW | 11 | (West Germany) Lothar Emmerich |
Manager:
(West Germany) Willi Multhaup

| GK | 1 | (Scotland) Tommy Lawrence |
| RB | 2 | (England) Chris Lawler |
| LB | 3 | (England) Gerry Byrne |
| MF | 4 | (England) Gordon Milne |
| CB | 5 | (Scotland) Ron Yeats (c) |
| MF | 6 | (Scotland) Willie Stevenson |
| RW | 7 | (England) Ian Callaghan |
| IN | 8 | (England) Roger Hunt |
| CF | 9 | (Scotland) Ian St. John |
| IN | 10 | (England) Tommy Smith |
| LW | 11 | (England) Peter Thompson |
Manager:
(Scotland) Bill Shankly
