= 1966–67 Liverpool F.C. season =

English football club season

Liverpool F.C.
1966–67 season
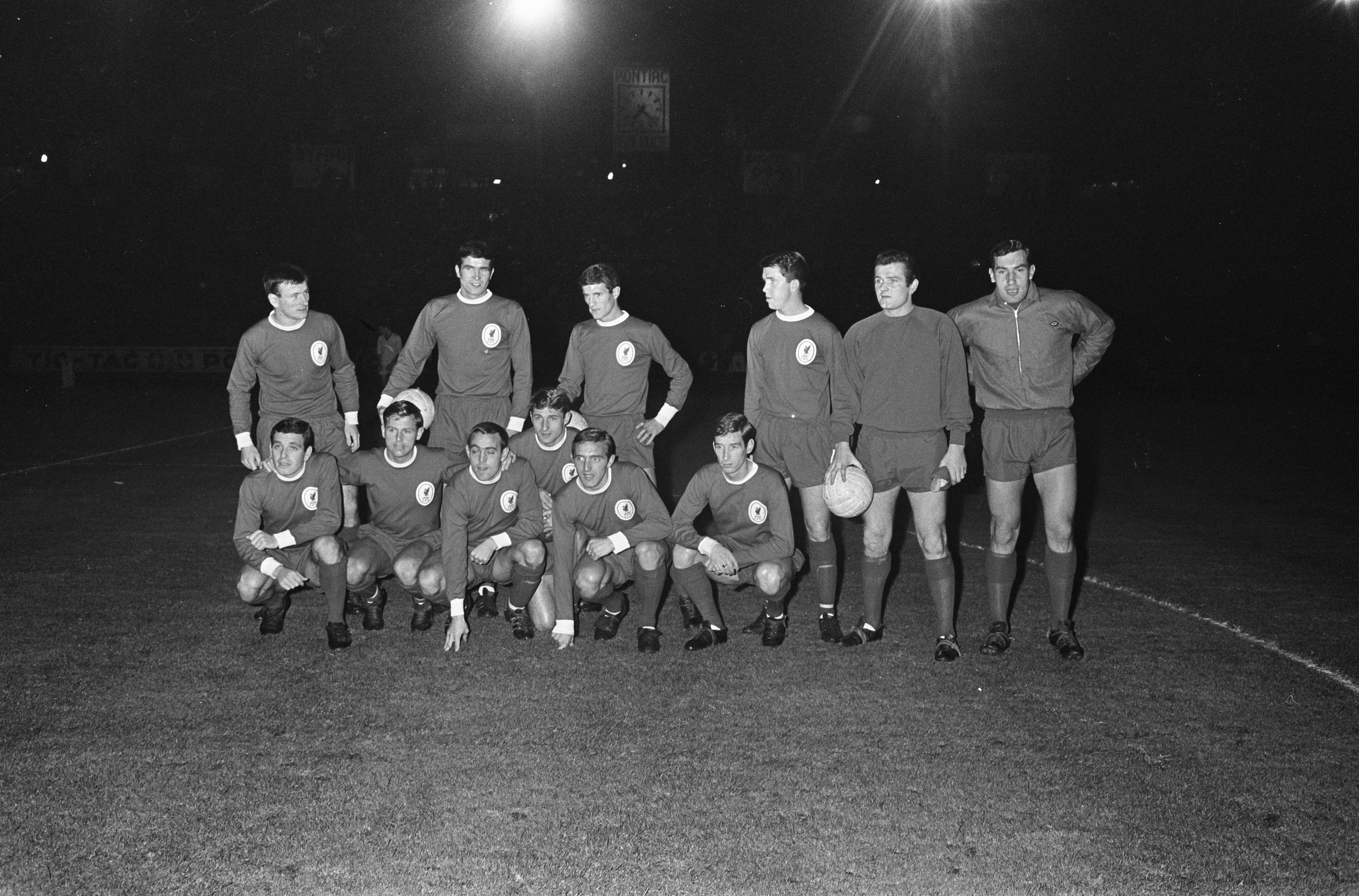
- Manager: Bill Shankly
- First Division: 5th
- European Cup: Second round
- FA Cup: Fifth round
- FA Charity Shield: Winners
- Top goalscorer: League: Roger Hunt (14); All: Roger Hunt (19)
| Home colours | Away colours | Third colours |

The 1966–67 season was Liverpool Football Club's 75th season in existence and their fifth consecutive season in the First Division. Their win against Everton at Goodison Park at least gave Liverpool the Charity Shield, but they were humbled by Ajax, led by a young Johan Cruyff, in the European Cup. Liverpool finished fifth in the table, with arch rivals Manchester United winning the championship instead.

== Squad ==
=== Goalkeepers ===
- (Scotland) Tommy Lawrence
- (Scotland) John Ogston

=== Defenders ===
- (England) Gerry Byrne
- (England) Chris Lawler
- (Scotland) Ian Ross
- (England) Tommy Smith
- (Scotland) Ron Yeats

=== Midfielders ===
- (England) Alf Arrowsmith
- (England) Ian Callaghan
- (England) Gordon Milne
- (Scotland) Willie Stevenson
- (Scotland) Ian St. John
- (Scotland) Gordon Wallace
- (England) Peter Thompson
- (England) David Wilson

=== Attackers ===
- (Scotland) Bobby Graham
- (England) Roger Hunt
- (England) Geoff Strong
- (Scotland) Ted MacDougall

== Squad statistics ==
=== Appearances and goals ===
| No. | Pos | Nat | Player | Total | | Division 1 | | FA Cup | | Charity Shield | | European Cup | |
| No. | Pos | Nat | Player | Apps | Goals | Apps | Goals | Apps | Goals | Apps | Goals | Apps | Goals |
|---|---|---|---|---|---|---|---|---|---|---|---|---|---|
| | FW | (England) ENG | Alf Arrowsmith | 9 | 2 | 6+3 | 2 | 0+0 | 0 | 0+0 | 0 | 0+0 | 0 |
| | DF | (England) ENG | Gerry Byrne | 12 | 0 | 9+0 | 0 | 2+0 | 0 | 1+0 | 0 | 0+0 | 0 |
| | MF | (England) ENG | Ian Callaghan | 50 | 5 | 40+0 | 4 | 4+0 | 0 | 1+0 | 0 | 5+0 | 1 |
| | FW | (Scotland) SCO | Bobby Graham | 5 | 1 | 3+0 | 1 | 0+0 | 0 | 0+0 | 0 | 2+0 | 0 |
| | DF | (England) ENG | Emlyn Hughes | 10 | 0 | 10+0 | 0 | 0+0 | 0 | 0+0 | 0 | 0+0 | 0 |
| | FW | (England) ENG | Roger Hunt | 48 | 19 | 39+0 | 14 | 3+0 | 1 | 1+0 | 1 | 5+0 | 3 |
| | DF | (England) ENG | Chris Lawler | 52 | 6 | 42+0 | 4 | 4+0 | 1 | 1+0 | 0 | 5+0 | 1 |
| | GK | (Scotland) SCO | Tommy Lawrence | 51 | 0 | 41+0 | 0 | 4+0 | 0 | 1+0 | 0 | 5+0 | 0 |
| | MF | (England) ENG | Gordon Milne | 40 | 1 | 31+2 | 1 | 4+0 | 0 | 0+0 | 0 | 3+0 | 0 |
| | GK | (Scotland) SCO | John Ogston | 1 | 0 | 1+0 | 0 | 0+0 | 0 | 0+0 | 0 | 0+0 | 0 |
| | DF | (Scotland) SCO | Ian Ross | 1 | 0 | 0+1 | 0 | 0+0 | 0 | 0+0 | 0 | 0+0 | 0 |
| | DF | (England) ENG | Tommy Smith | 52 | 1 | 42+0 | 1 | 4+0 | 0 | 1+0 | 0 | 5+0 | 0 |
| | FW | (Scotland) SCO | Ian St John | 49 | 13 | 39+0 | 9 | 4+0 | 2 | 1+0 | 0 | 5+0 | 2 |
| | MF | (Scotland) SCO | Willie Stevenson | 51 | 3 | 41+0 | 3 | 4+0 | 0 | 1+0 | 0 | 5+0 | 0 |
| | FW | (England) ENG | Geoff Strong | 45 | 11 | 36+0 | 11 | 3+0 | 0 | 1+0 | 0 | 5+0 | 0 |
| | MF | (England) ENG | Peter Thompson | 52 | 11 | 42+0 | 10 | 4+0 | 0 | 1+0 | 0 | 5+0 | 1 |
| | MF | (England) ENG | Dave Wilson | 1 | 0 | 0+1 | 0 | 0+0 | 0 | 0+0 | 0 | 0+0 | 0 |
| | DF | (Scotland) SCO | Ron Yeats | 50 | 2 | 40+0 | 2 | 4+0 | 0 | 1+0 | 0 | 5+0 | 0 |

== First Division ==
=== Table ===
| Pos | Team | Pld | W | D | L | GF | GA | GAv | Pts | Qualification or relegation |
|---|---|---|---|---|---|---|---|---|---|---|
| 3 | Tottenham Hotspur | 42 | 24 | 8 | 10 | 71 | 48 | 1.479 | 56 | Qualification for the European Cup Winners' Cup first round (Note: Tottenham Hotspur qualified for the European Cup Winners' Cup as the 1966–67 FA Cup winners.) |
| 4 | Leeds United | 42 | 22 | 11 | 9 | 62 | 42 | 1.476 | 55 | Qualification for the Inter-Cities Fairs Cup first round |
| 5 | Liverpool | 42 | 19 | 13 | 10 | 64 | 47 | 1.362 | 51 | Qualification for the Inter-Cities Fairs Cup first round |
| 6 | Everton | 42 | 19 | 10 | 13 | 65 | 46 | 1.413 | 48 | |
| 7 | Arsenal | 42 | 16 | 14 | 12 | 58 | 47 | 1.234 | 46 | |

Source: World Football
Rules for classification: 1) Points; 2) Goal average; 3) Goals scored

=== Matches ===
| Date | Opponents | Venue | Result | Scorers | Attendance | Report 1 | Report 2 |
|---|---|---|---|---|---|---|---|
| 20-Aug-66 | Leicester City | H | 3–2 | Hunt 10' Strong 31' Stevenson 65 pen' | 49,076 | Report | Report |
| 24-Aug-66 | Manchester City | A | 1–2 | Strong 35' | 50,923 | Report | Report |
| 27-Aug-66 | Everton | A | 1–3 | Smith 43' | 64,318 | Report | Report |
| 30-Aug-66 | Manchester City | H | 3–2 | Hunt 4', 80' Strong 7' | 51,645 | Report | Report |
| 03-Sep-66 | West Ham United | A | 1–1 | Strong 88' | 33,000 | Report | Report |
| 05-Sep-66 | Blackpool | A | 2–1 | Hunt 18' Thompson 85' | 24,375 | Report | Report |
| 10-Sep-66 | Sheffield Wednesday | H | 1–1 | Strong 19' | 48,717 | Report | Report |
| 17-Sep-66 | Southampton | A | 2–1 | St. John 35' Callaghan 48' | 28,287 | Report | Report |
| 24-Sep-66 | Sunderland | H | 2–2 | Yeats 10' Hunt 46' | 45,706 | Report | Report |
| 01-Oct-66 | Aston Villa | A | 3–2 | St. John 31' Callaghan 65' Graham 67' | 24,909 | Report | Report |
| 08-Oct-66 | Fulham | H | 2–2 | Strong 1' St. John 36' | 44,024 | Report | Report |
| 15-Oct-66 | Nottingham Forest | A | 1–1 | Hunt 19' | 32,887 | Report | Report |
| 29-Oct-66 | Stoke City | A | 0–2 | | 37,933 | Report | Report |
| 05-Nov-66 | Nottingham Forest | H | 4–0 | Strong 16' Hunt 62', 75' Thompson 73' | 40,624 | Report | Report |
| 09-Nov-66 | Burnley | H | 2–0 | Lawler 4' Thompson 89' | 50,124 | Report | Report |
| 12-Nov-66 | Newcastle United | A | 2–0 | St. John 22' Hunt 65' | 36,910 | Report | Report |
| 19-Nov-66 | Leeds United | H | 5–0 | Lawler 43' Thompson 57' Strong 75', 89' St. John 83' | 51,014 | Report | Report |
| 26-Nov-66 | West Bromwich Albion | A | 1–2 | Strong 79' | 25,900 | Report | Report |
| 03-Dec-66 | Sheffield United | H | 1–0 | St. John 89' | 42,762 | Report | Report |
| 10-Dec-66 | Manchester United | A | 2–2 | St. John 15', 45' | 62,500 | Report | Report |
| 24-Dec-66 | Chelsea | A | 2–1 | Own goal 21' Strong 39' | 36,921 | Report | Report |
| 26-Dec-66 | Chelsea | H | 2–1 | Stevenson 67' Hunt 75' | 51,920 | Report | Report |
| 31-Dec-66 | Everton | H | 0–0 | | 53,744 | Report | Report |
| 07-Jan-67 | West Ham United | H | 2–0 | Thompson 35', 40' | 48,518 | Report | Report |
| 14-Jan-67 | Sheffield Wednesday | A | 1–0 | Thompson 44' | 43,591 | Report | Report |
| 18-Jan-67 | Leicester City | A | 1–2 | Own goal 60' | 32,049 | Report | Report |
| 21-Jan-67 | Southampton | H | 2–1 | Lawler 23' Arrowsmith 35' | 47,545 | Report | Report |
| 04-Feb-67 | Sunderland | A | 2–2 | Yeats 10' Thompson 28' | 45,301 | Report | Report |
| 11-Feb-67 | Aston Villa | H | 1–0 | Milne 28' | 45,747 | Report | Report |
| 25-Feb-67 | Fulham | A | 2–2 | St. John 65' Strong 78' | 37,481 | Report | Report |
| 04-Mar-67 | Stoke City | H | 2–1 | Lawler 14' Hunt 62' | 48,891 | Report | Report |
| 18-Mar-67 | Burnley | A | 0–1 | | 29,338 | Report | Report |
| 25-Mar-67 | Manchester United | H | 0–0 | | 53,813 | Report | Report |
| 27-Mar-67 | Arsenal | H | 0–0 | | 46,168 | Report | Report |
| 28-Mar-67 | Arsenal | A | 1–1 | Arrowsmith 68' | 35,795 | Report | Report |
| 01-Apr-67 | Tottenham Hotspur | A | 1–2 | Thompson 80' | 53,135 | Report | Report |
| 07-Apr-67 | Newcastle United | H | 3–1 | Hunt 48', 80' Thompson 84' | 44,824 | Report | Report |
| 22-Apr-67 | West Bromwich Albion | H | 0–1 | | 39,883 | Report | Report |
| 28-Apr-67 | Sheffield United | A | 1–0 | Hunt 82' | 19,110 | Report | Report |
| 03-May-67 | Leeds United | A | 1–2 | Stevenson 23 pen' | 36,597 | Report | Report |
| 06-May-67 | Tottenham Hotspur | H | 0–0 | | 40,845 | Report | Report |
| 13-May-67 | Blackpool | H | 1–3 | Thompson 21' | 28,773 | Report | Report |

=== FA Charity Shield ===
13 August 1966

| Liverpool | 1–0 | Everton |
|---|---|---|
| Hunt 9' | Report |

Goodison Park, Liverpool
Attendance: 63,329

=== FA Cup ===
| Date | Opponents | Venue | Result | Scorers | Attendance | Report 1 | Report 2 |
|---|---|---|---|---|---|---|---|
| 28-Jan-67 | Watford | A | 0–0 | | 33,000 | Report | Report |
| 01-Feb-67 | Watford | H | 3–1 | St. John 38' Hunt 41' Lawler 67' | 54,451 | Report | Report |
| 18-Feb-67 | Aston Villa | H | 1–0 | St. John 77' | 52,477 | Report | Report |
| 11-Mar-67 | Everton | A | 0–1 | | 64,851 | Report | Report |

=== European Cup ===
| Date | Opponents | Venue | Result | Scorers | Attendance | Report 1 | Report 2 |
|---|---|---|---|---|---|---|---|
| 28-Sep-66 | Petrolul Ploiești | A | 2–0 | St. John 71' Callaghan 80' | 44,463 | Report | Report |
| 12-Oct-66 | Petrolul Ploiești | H | 1–3 | Hunt 53' | 20,000 | Report | Report |
| 19-Oct-66 | Petrolul Ploiești | N | 2–0 | St. John 13' Thompson 43' | 15,000 | Report | Report |
| 07-Dec-66 | Ajax | A | 1–5 | Lawler 90' | 65,000 | Report | Report |
| 14-Dec-66 | Ajax | H | 2–2 | Hunt 54', 88' | 53,846 | Report | Report |
