= 1967–68 Liverpool F.C. season =

English football club season

Liverpool F.C.
1967–68 season
- Manager: Bill Shankly
- First Division: 3rd
- Inter-Cities Fairs Cup: Third round
- FA Cup: Quarter-finals
- League Cup: Second round
- Top goalscorer: League: Roger Hunt (25); All: Roger Hunt (30)
Home colours	Away colours	Third colours

The 1967–68 season was Liverpool Football Club's 76th season in existence and their sixth consecutive season in the First Division. Liverpool did not win any major trophies for the second season in a row. Despite top scorer Roger Hunt performing well, Liverpool finished three points behind champions Manchester City, while rivals Manchester United would later beat Liverpool to the honour of being the first English club to win the European Cup.

== Squad ==
=== Goalkeepers ===
- (England) Ray Clemence
- (Scotland) Tommy Lawrence

=== Defenders ===
- (England) Gerry Byrne
- (England) Chris Lawler
- (Scotland) Ian Ross
- (England) Tommy Smith
- (England) Peter Wall
- (Scotland) Ron Yeats

=== Midfielders ===
- (England) Alf Arrowsmith
- (England) Ian Callaghan
- (England) Emlyn Hughes
- (England) Doug Livermore
- (England) Peter Wall
- (England) Stuart Mason
- (Scotland) Willie Stevenson
- (Scotland) Ian St. John
- (Scotland) Gordon Wallace
- (England) Peter Thompson
- (England) David Wilson

=== Attackers ===
- (Scotland) Bobby Graham
- (England) Tony Hateley
- (England) Roger Hunt

== Squad statistics ==
=== Appearances and goals ===
No.	Pos	Nat	Player	Total		Division 1		FA Cup		League Cup		Fairs Cup	
No.	Pos	Nat	Player	Apps	Goals	Apps	Goals	Apps	Goals	Apps	Goals	Apps	Goals
	FW	(England) ENG	Alf Arrowsmith	4	1	3+0	1	1+0	0	0+0	0	0+0	0
	DF	(England) ENG	Gerry Byrne	36	0	27+0	0	1+0	0	2+0	0	6+0	0
	MF	(England) ENG	Ian Callaghan	58	7	41+0	3	9+0	0	2+0	1	6+0	3
	FW	(Scotland) SCO	Bobby Graham	4	1	2+2	1	0+0	0	0+0	0	0+0	0
	FW	(England) ENG	Tony Hateley	52	27	38+0	16	7+0	8	2+0	0	5+0	3
	DF	(England) ENG	Emlyn Hughes	56	2	39+0	2	9+0	0	2+0	0	6+0	0
	FW	(England) ENG	Roger Hunt	57	30	40+0	25	9+0	2	2+0	0	6+0	3
	DF	(England) ENG	Chris Lawler	59	4	42+0	3	9+0	1	2+0	0	6+0	0
	GK	(Scotland) SCO	Tommy Lawrence	59	0	42+0	0	9+0	0	2+0	0	6+0	0
	MF	(England) ENG	Doug Livermore	1	0	0+1	0	0+0	0	0+0	0	0+0	0
	DF	(Scotland) SCO	Ian Ross	6	0	4+0	0	2+0	0	0+0	0	0+0	0
	DF	(England) ENG	Tommy Smith	51	6	36+0	3	7+0	1	2+0	1	6+0	1
	FW	(Scotland) SCO	Ian St John	56	6	41+0	5	9+0	0	2+0	0	4+0	1
	MF	(Scotland) SCO	Willie Stevenson	4	1	1+0	1	0+0	0	0+0	0	2+1	0
	FW	(England) ENG	Geoff Strong	29	6	18+1	5	9+0	1	0+0	0	1+0	0
	MF	(England) ENG	Peter Thompson	58	5	41+0	2	9+0	1	2+0	1	6+0	1
	DF	(England) ENG	Peter Wall	9	0	9+0	0	0+0	0	0+0	0	0+0	0
	DF	(Scotland) SCO	Ron Yeats	55	3	38+0	2	9+0	0	2+0	0	6+0	1

== Standings ==
Pos	Team	Pld	W	D	L	GF	GA	GAv	Pts	Qualification or relegation
1	Manchester City (C)	42	26	6	10	86	43	2.000	58	Qualification for the European Cup first round
2	Manchester United	42	24	8	10	89	55	1.618	56	Qualification for the European Cup first round (Note: Manchester United qualified for the European Cup as the 1967–68 European Cup winners.)
3	Liverpool	42	22	11	9	71	40	1.775	55	Qualification for the Inter-Cities Fairs Cup first round
4	Leeds United	42	22	9	11	71	41	1.732	53	Qualification for the Inter-Cities Fairs Cup first round
5	Everton	42	23	6	13	67	40	1.675	52	

Source: World Football
Rules for classification: 1) Points; 2) Goal average; 3) Goals scored
(C) Champions

== Results ==
=== First Division ===
Date	Opponents	Venue	Result	Scorers	Attendance	Report 1	Report 2
19-Aug-67	Manchester City	A	0–0		49,343	Report	Report
22-Aug-67	Arsenal	H	2–0	Hunt 23', 75'	52,033	Report	Report
26-Aug-67	Newcastle United	H	6–0	Hateley 8', 47', 75' Hughes 30' Hunt 41', 87'	51,829	Report	Report
28-Aug-67	Arsenal	A	0–2		33,420	Report	Report
02-Sep-67	West Bromwich Albion	A	2–0	Hateley 6' Hunt 58'	32,737	Report	Report
05-Sep-67	Nottingham Forest	A	1–0	Hughes 51'	39,352	Report	Report
09-Sep-67	Chelsea	H	3–1	Smith 37' (pen.) Hateley 46', 47'	53,839	Report	Report
16-Sep-67	Southampton	A	0–1		29,512	Report	Report
23-Sep-67	Everton	H	1–0	Hunt 78'	54,189	Report	Report
30-Sep-67	Stoke City	H	2–1	Thompson 38' Smith 55'	50,220	Report	Report
07-Oct-67	Leicester City	A	1–2	St. John 27'	25,609	Report	Report
14-Oct-67	West Ham United	A	3–1	St. John 15', 38' Smith 68'	46,951	Report	Report
24-Oct-67	Burnley	A	1–1	Lawler 82'	29,855	Report	Report
28-Oct-67	Sheffield Wednesday	H	1–0	Lawler 10'	50,399	Report	Report
04-Nov-67	Tottenham Hotspur	A	1–1	Hunt 72'	47,682	Report	Report
11-Nov-67	Manchester United	H	1–2	Hunt 83'	54,515	Report	Report
18-Nov-67	Sunderland	A	1–1	Own goal 26'	29,993	Report	Report
25-Nov-67	Wolverhampton Wanderers	H	2–1	Hateley 1' Stevenson 83' (pen.)	43,885	Report	Report
02-Dec-67	Fulham	A	1–1	Hateley 80'	29,330	Report	Report
09-Dec-67	Leeds United	H	2–0	Hunt 18' Own goal 44'	39,676	Report	Report
16-Dec-67	Manchester City	H	1–1	Hunt 50'	53,268	Report	Report
23-Dec-67	Newcastle United	A	1–1	St. John 43'	46,190	Report	Report
26-Dec-67	Coventry City	A	1–1	Hunt 13'	42,209	Report	Report
30-Dec-67	Coventry City	H	1–0	Callaghan 17'	48,866	Report	Report
06-Jan-68	West Bromwich Albion	H	4–1	Strong 3' Hunt 56', 67', 79'	51,092	Report	Report
20-Jan-68	Southampton	H	2–0	Strong 55' Yeats 85'	44,906	Report	Report
03-Feb-68	Everton	A	0–1		64,482	Report	Report
12-Feb-68	Chelsea	A	1–3	Thompson 80'	40,670	Report	Report
24-Feb-68	Leicester City	H	3–1	Callaghan 51' Strong 59' Hateley 78'	41,451	Report	Report
02-Mar-68	Wolverhampton Wanderers	A	1–1	Hunt 79'	33,207	Report	Report
16-Mar-68	Burnley	H	3–2	Hateley 31', 73' Strong 61'	41,114	Report	Report
23-Mar-68	Sheffield Wednesday	A	2–1	Hunt 27' Arrowsmith 88'	32,177	Report	Report
06-Apr-68	Manchester United	A	2–1	Yeats 9' Hunt 17'	63,050	Report	Report
12-Apr-68	Sheffield United	H	1–2	Hunt 32'	50,422	Report	Report
13-Apr-68	Sunderland	H	2–1	Hunt 18', 71'	40,350	Report	Report
15-Apr-68	Sheffield United	A	1–1	Strong 34'	22,743	Report	Report
20-Apr-68	West Ham United	A	0–1		33,060	Report	Report
27-Apr-68	Fulham	H	4–1	Callaghan 29' Hunt 40', 49' Hateley 56'	32,307	Report	Report
29-Apr-68	Tottenham Hotspur	H	1–1	Hateley 38'	41,688	Report	Report
04-May-68	Leeds United	A	2–1	Lawler 84' Graham 85'	44,553	Report	Report
11-May-68	Nottingham Forest	H	6–1	St. John 34' Hateley 36', 41', 84' Hunt 55', 71'	38,850	Report	Report
15-May-68	Stoke City	A	1–2	Hunt 58'	27,693	Report	Report

=== Football League Cup ===
Date	Opponents	Venue	Result	Scorers	Attendance	Report 1	Report 2
13-Sep-67	Bolton Wanderers	H	1–1	Thompson 73'	45,957	Report	Report
27-Sep-67	Bolton Wanderers	A	2–3	Smith 35' (pen.) Callaghan 80'	31,500	Report	Report

=== FA Cup ===
Date	Opponents	Venue	Result	Scorers	Attendance	Report 1	Report 2
27-Jan-68	Bournemouth	A	0–0		24,388	Report	Report
30-Jan-68	Bournemouth	H	4–1	Hateley 33' Thompson 44' Hunt 51' Lawler 73'	54,075	Report	Report
17-Feb-68	Walsall	A	0–0		21,066	Report	Report
19-Feb-68	Walsall	H	5–2	Hateley 24', 33', 64', 71' Strong 34'	39,113	Report	Report
09-Mar-68	Tottenham Hotspur	A	1–1	Hateley 54'	54,005	Report	Report
12-Mar-68	Tottenham Hotspur	H	2–1	Hunt 23' Smith 78' (pen.)	53,658	Report	Report
30-Mar-68	West Bromwich Albion	A	0–0		53,062	Report	Report
08-Apr-68	West Bromwich Albion	H	1–1	Hateley 24'	54,273	Report	Report
18-Apr-68	West Bromwich Albion	N	1–2	Hateley 39'	56,000	Report	Report

=== Inter-Cities Fairs Cup ===
Date	Opponents	Venue	Result	Scorers	Attendance	Report 1	Report 2
19-Sep-67	Malmö FF	A	2–0	Hateley 9', 80'	14,314	Report	Report
04-Oct-67	Malmö FF	H	2–1	Yeats 28' Hunt 36'	39,795	Report	Report
07-Nov-67	TSV 1860 München	H	8–0	St. John 6' Hateley 9' Smith 43' (pen.) Hunt 52', 54' Thompson 53' Callaghan 63', 70'	44,812	Report	Report
14-Nov-67	TSV 1860 München	A	1–2	Callaghan 5'	10,000	Report	Report
28-Nov-67	Ferencvárosi TC	A	0–1		30,000	Report	Report
09-Jan-68	Ferencvárosi TC	H	0–1		46,892	Report	Report
