= 1968–69 Liverpool F.C. season =

English football club season

Liverpool F.C.
1968–69 season
- Manager: Bill Shankly
- First Division: 2nd
- Inter-Cities Fairs Cup: First round
- FA Cup: Fifth round
- League Cup: Fourth round
- Top goalscorer: League: Roger Hunt (13); All: Roger Hunt (17)
Home colours	Away colours

The 1968–69 season was Liverpool Football Club's 77th season in existence and their seventh consecutive season in the First Division. Liverpool came close to a record eighth league title, as they picked up the same number points that won them their seventh title in 1965–66. However, the team finished second to Don Revie's Leeds United.

An early exit in the Fairs Cup, losing on coin toss to Athletic Bilbao in the opening round was the main disappointment, meaning that Bill Shankly was yet to lead the club to a European trophy.

In both the League Cup and FA Cup they were knocked out by the eventual runners-up in both tournaments.

== Squad ==
=== Goalkeepers ===
- (England) Ray Clemence
- (Scotland) Tommy Lawrence

=== Defenders ===
- (England) Gerry Byrne
- (England) Chris Lawler
- (England) John McLaughlin
- (Scotland) Ian Ross
- (England) Tommy Smith
- (England) Geoff Strong
- (England) Peter Wall
- (Scotland) Ron Yeats

=== Midfielders ===
- (England) Ian Callaghan
- (Scotland) Brian Hall
- (England) Emlyn Hughes
- (England) Doug Livermore
- (Scotland) Ian St. John
- (England) Peter Thompson

=== Attackers ===
- (England) Alf Arrowsmith
- (England) Phil Boersma
- (England) Alun Evans
- (Scotland) Bobby Graham
- (England) Tony Hateley
- (England) Roger Hunt

== Squad statistics ==
=== Appearances and goals ===
No.	Pos	Nat	Player	Total		Division 1		FA Cup		League Cup		Fairs Cup	
No.	Pos	Nat	Player	Apps	Goals	Apps	Goals	Apps	Goals	Apps	Goals	Apps	Goals
	DF	(England) ENG	Gerry Byrne	3	0	2+1	0	0+0	0	0+0	0	0+0	0
	MF	(England) ENG	Ian Callaghan	51	10	42+0	8	4+0	1	3+0	1	2+0	0
	GK	(England) ENG	Ray Clemence	1	0	0+0	0	0+0	0	1+0	0	0+0	0
	FW	(England) ENG	Alun Evans	39	7	33+0	7	4+0	0	1+0	0	1+0	0
	FW	(Scotland) SCO	Bobby Graham	15	5	11+1	5	0+1	0	1+0	0	1+0	0
	MF	(Scotland) SCO	Brian Hall	2	0	0+2	0	0+0	0	0+0	0	0+0	0
	FW	(England) ENG	Tony Hateley	4	1	4+0	1	0+0	0	0+0	0	0+0	0
	DF	(England) ENG	Emlyn Hughes	49	5	40+0	3	4+0	1	3+0	0	2+0	1
	FW	(England) ENG	Roger Hunt	47	17	38+0	13	4+0	1	3+0	2	2+0	1
	DF	(England) ENG	Chris Lawler	51	7	42+0	3	4+0	0	3+0	3	2+0	1
	GK	(Scotland) SCO	Tommy Lawrence	50	0	42+0	0	4+0	0	2+0	0	2+0	0
	DF	(Scotland) SCO	Ian Ross	4	0	3+0	0	0+0	0	0+0	0	0+1	0
	DF	(England) ENG	Tommy Smith	51	7	42+0	6	4+0	1	3+0	0	2+0	0
	FW	(Scotland) SCO	Ian St John	50	4	41+0	4	4+0	0	3+0	0	2+0	0
	FW	(England) ENG	Geoff Strong	38	2	28+3	2	4+0	0	2+0	0	0+1	0
	MF	(England) ENG	Peter Thompson	51	9	42+0	8	4+0	0	3+0	1	2+0	0
	DF	(England) ENG	Peter Wall	17	0	13+0	0	0+0	0	2+0	0	2+0	0
	DF	(Scotland) SCO	Ron Yeats	48	2	39+0	2	4+0	0	3+0	0	2+0	0

== League table ==
Pos	Team	Pld	W	D	L	GF	GA	GAv	Pts	Qualification or relegation
1	Leeds United (C)	42	27	13	2	66	26	2.538	67	Qualification for the European Cup first round
2	Liverpool	42	25	11	6	63	24	2.625	61	Qualification for the Inter-Cities Fairs Cup first round
3	Everton	42	21	15	6	77	36	2.139	57	
4	Arsenal	42	22	12	8	56	27	2.074	56	Qualification for the Inter-Cities Fairs Cup first round (Note: Everton were ineligible to participate in the Inter-Cities Fairs Cup as Liverpool had already qualified. Under the rules of the cup, only one team per city could participate. Arsenal took their place as the highest-ranked team that had not already qualified for a European competition.)
5	Chelsea	42	20	10	12	73	53	1.377	50	

Source: World Football
Rules for classification: 1) Points; 2) Goal average; 3) Goals scored
(C) Champions

== Results ==
=== First Division ===
Date	Opponents	Venue	Result	Scorers	Attendance	Report 1	Report 2
10-Aug-68	Manchester City	H	2–1	Graham 24' Thompson 73'	51,236	Report	Report
14-Aug-68	Southampton	A	0–2		24,453	Report	Report
17-Aug-68	Arsenal	A	1–1	Hunt 50'	43,535	Report	Report
20-Aug-68	Stoke City	H	2–1	Callaghan 63' Own goal 75'	46,674	Report	Report
24-Aug-68	Sunderland	H	4–1	Smith 1' Lawler 16' Callaghan 44' Hateley 66'	46,547	Report	Report
27-Aug-68	Everton	A	0–0		63,898	Report	Report
31-Aug-68	Leeds United	A	0–1		38,929	Report	Report
07-Sep-68	Queens Park Rangers	H	2–0	Yeats 43' Graham 55'	46,025	Report	Report
14-Sep-68	Ipswich Town	A	2–0	Graham 48' St. John 89'	24,514	Report	Report
21-Sep-68	Leicester City	H	4–0	Yeats 2' Smith 4 pen' Evans 10' Callaghan 12'	48,375	Report	Report
28-Sep-68	Wolverhampton Wanderers	A	6–0	Hunt 15', 74' Thompson 25', 80' Evans 30', 63'	39,310	Report	Report
05-Oct-68	Burnley	A	4–0	Hunt 20', 35' Thompson 62' Strong 87'	26,238	Report	Report
08-Oct-68	Everton	H	1–1	Smith 75'	54,496	Report	Report
12-Oct-68	Manchester United	H	2–0	St. John 14' Evans 82'	53,392	Report	Report
19-Oct-68	Tottenham Hotspur	A	1–2	Hunt 37'	44,122	Report	Report
26-Oct-68	Newcastle United	H	2–1	Evans 23' Thompson 85'	45,323	Report	Report
02-Nov-68	West Bromwich Albion	A	0–0		34,600	Report	Report
09-Nov-68	Chelsea	H	2–1	Callaghan 25' Smith 28 pen'	47,248	Report	Report
16-Nov-68	Sheffield Wednesday	A	2–1	Lawler 28' Callaghan 71'	31,245	Report	Report
23-Nov-68	Coventry City	H	2–0	Strong 36' Callaghan 83'	44,820	Report	Report
30-Nov-68	Nottingham Forest	A	1–0	Hunt 24'	25,175	Report	Report
03-Dec-68	Southampton	H	1–0	Callaghan 14'	45,527	Report	Report
07-Dec-68	West Ham United	H	2–0	Hughes 44' Thompson 47'	48,632	Report	Report
14-Dec-68	Manchester United	A	0–1		59,000	Report	Report
21-Dec-68	Tottenham Hotspur	H	1–0	Hughes 70'	43,843	Report	Report
26-Dec-68	Burnley	H	1–1	Lawler 43'	52,515	Report	Report
11-Jan-69	West Bromwich Albion	H	1–0	Thompson 83'	47,587	Report	Report
18-Jan-69	Chelsea	A	2–1	Hunt 65' Evans 72'	51,872	Report	Report
01-Feb-69	Sheffield Wednesday	H	1–0	Hunt 65'	45,406	Report	Report
15-Feb-69	Nottingham Forest	H	0–2		42,359	Report	Report
22-Feb-69	West Ham United	A	1–1	Hunt 51'	36,498	Report	Report
15-Mar-69	Sunderland	A	2–0	St. John 39' Evans 62'	17,855	Report	Report
29-Mar-69	Queens Park Rangers	A	2–1	Smith 28 pen' Strong 78'	16,792	Report	Report
31-Mar-69	Arsenal	H	1–1	Smith 52 pen'	44,843	Report	Report
05-Apr-69	Wolverhampton Wanderers	H	1–0	Hunt 20'	45,399	Report	Report
07-Apr-69	Stoke City	A	0–0		27,389	Report	Report
12-Apr-69	Leicester City	A	2–1	Hughes 30' Callaghan 56'	28,671	Report	Report
19-Apr-69	Ipswich Town	H	4–0	Thompson 13' Graham 40', 66' St. John 90'	40,449	Report	Report
22-Apr-69	Coventry City	A	0–0		35,106	Report	Report
28-Apr-69	Leeds United	H	0–0		53,750	Report	Report
12-May-69	Manchester City	A	0–1		28,309	Report	Report
17-May-69	Newcastle United	A	1–1	Hunt 68'	34,910	Report	Report

=== Football League Cup ===
Date	Opponents	Venue	Result	Scorers	Attendance	Report 1	Report 2
04-Sep-68	Sheffield United	H	4–0	Hunt 54' Lawler 71' Callaghan 75' Thompson 83'	32,358	Report	Report
25-Sep-68	Swansea Town	H	2–0	Lawler 52' Hunt 85'	31,051	Report	Report
15-Oct-68	Arsenal	A	1–2	Lawler 75'	39,299	Report	Report

=== FA Cup ===
Date	Opponents	Venue	Result	Scorers	Attendance	Report 1	Report 2
04-Jan-69	Doncaster Rovers	H	2–0	Hunt 70' Callaghan 84'	48,330	Report	Report
25-Jan-69	Burnley	H	2–1	Smith 13 pen' Hughes 23'	53,677	Report	Report
01-Mar-69	Leicester City	A	0–0		42,002	Report	Report
03-Mar-69	Leicester City	H	0–1		54,666	Report	Report

=== Inter-Cities Fairs Cup ===
Date	Opponents	Venue	Result	Scorers	Attendance	Report 1	Report 2
18-Sep-68	Athletic Bilbao	A	1–2	Hunt 67'	28,004	Report	Report
02-Oct-68	Athletic Bilbao	H	2–1	Lawler 78' Hughes 87'	49,567	Report	Report
