= 1965 FA Cup final =

- Match programme cover
- Event: 1964–65 FA Cup
Leeds United	Liverpool
1	2
- After extra time
- Date: 1 May 1965
- Venue: Wembley Stadium, London
- Referee: William Clements (Birmingham)
- Attendance: 100,000

The 1965 FA Cup final was an association football match between Leeds United and Liverpool on 1 May 1965 at Wembley Stadium, London. It was the final match of the 1964–65 FA Cup, the 93rd season of England's primary cup competition, the Football Association Challenge Cup, better known as the FA Cup. Liverpool were appearing in their third final, having lost the previous two in 1914 and 1950, while Leeds were appearing in their first.

Both teams entered the competition in the third round. Leeds' matches ranged from close games to comfortable victories. They won their third round tie against Southport 3–0 and beat Manchester United 1–0 in a semi-final replay following a 0–0 draw in the initial match. The majority of Liverpool's matches were close affairs; they did not score more than two goals in any of their matches and this was also their biggest margin of victory.

Watched by a crowd of 100,000, the first 90 minutes of the final were goalless as both sides struggled to create goalscoring chances. Liverpool defender Gerry Byrne broke his collarbone early in the match but carried on as there were no substitutes. He was involved in the opening goal in extra time. Byrne found striker Roger Hunt in the 93rd minute, with a cross from the right-hand side of the pitch, which Hunt headed into the Leeds goal to give Liverpool the lead. Leeds equalised seven minutes later when Billy Bremner scored. However, Liverpool regained the lead in the 117th minute when striker Ian St John headed in a pass from Ian Callaghan. Liverpool thus won the match 2–1 to win the FA Cup for the first time.

Liverpool manager Bill Shankly was delighted with his team's victory and hailed it as his "greatest moment" in management. His Leeds counterpart, Don Revie, conceded Liverpool had been the better team, but was determined to make amends the following season. The national media was critical of the final, labelling it "boring".

== Route to the final ==
=== Leeds United ===
Leeds' route to the final
Round	Opponents	Score
3rd	Southport (H)	3-0
4th	Everton (H)	1–1
4th	Everton (A)	2–1
5th	Shrewsbury Town (H)	2–0
6th	Crystal Palace (A)	3–0
SF	Manchester United (N)	0–0
SF	Manchester United (N)	1–0
Key: (H) = Home venue; (A) = Away venue; (N) = Neutral venue

Leeds entered the competition in the third round and were drawn against Fourth Division team Southport. Jimmy Greenhoff opened the scoring for Leeds in the 26th minute at their home ground, Elland Road. Albert Johanneson added a second in the 81st minute and Terry Cooper scored a third before the end of the match to secure a 3–0 win for Leeds. Everton were the opposition in the fourth round. The match finished 1–1 at Elland Road, with Jim Storrie scoring Leeds' goal in the 50th minute. A replay was held at Everton's home ground, Goodison Park, three days later. Goals from Don Weston and Jack Charlton secured a 2–1 victory for Leeds and progression to the fifth round.

Shrewsbury Town were the opposition in the fifth round. Leeds won 2–0 at Elland Road, courtesy of goals from Johnny Giles and Albert Johanneson to secure their passage to the sixth round. Their opposition was Crystal Palace, in a match played at their home ground, Selhurst Park. Leeds won 3–0 with two goals from Alan Peacock and one from Storrie. Local rivals Manchester United were the opposition in the semi-finals. Neither side was able to score in a fiery match at Hillsborough, which The Guardian referred to as "a sordid shambles that would have been flattered by being played on an ashpit." The match was replayed a few days later at the City Ground. The match was goalless until the 89th minute when Bremner headed in a free-kick by Giles to secure a 1–0 victory for Leeds. The replay was not without incident, following the end of the match, hundreds of fans ran onto the pitch. A 16-year-old Manchester United supporter knocked the referee Dick Windle unconscious; he was subsequently caught and handed in to the police.

=== Liverpool ===
Liverpool's route to the final
Round	Opponents	Score
3rd	West Bromwich Albion (A)	2–1
4th	Stockport County (H)	1–1
4th	Stockport County (A)	2–0
5th	Bolton Wanderers (A)	1–0
6th	Leicester City (A)	0–0
6th	Leicester City (H)	1–0
SF	Chelsea (N)	2–0
Key: (H) = Home venue; (A) = Away venue; (N) = Neutral venue

Liverpool entered the competition in the third round, where they were drawn with West Bromwich Albion. Roger Hunt gave Liverpool the lead in the match held at West Bromwich's home ground, The Hawthorns, in the 44th minute. They extended their lead in the 63rd minute when Ian St John scored. West Bromwich were awarded a penalty in the 77th minute, after Liverpool defender Ron Yeats handled the ball, thinking the referee had blown for a free-kick. Cram missed the subsequent penalty, but West Bromwich scored three minutes later through Jeff Astle. However, they were unable to score a second and Liverpool won 2–1 to progress to the fourth round. Stockport County were the opposition in the fourth round. The match, at Anfield, finished 1–1, Gordon Milne equalised for Liverpool after Len White had given Stockport the lead in the 18th minute. Liverpool won the replay, at Edgeley Park, 2–0 courtesy of two goals from Hunt.

Bolton Wanderers were the opposition in the fifth round. The match at Bolton's home ground, Burnden Park, remained goalless until the 85th minute when Liverpool midfielder Ian Callaghan scored. The goal caused the Liverpool fans behind the goal to surge forward, which resulted in the collapse of a wooden railing. There were no serious injuries and the referee continued with the match, which Liverpool won 1–0, to progress to the sixth round. They faced Leicester City in the sixth round. Despite chances for both teams throughout the match at Filbert Street, neither team scored and the match finished 0–0. The match was replayed at Anfield four days later, which Liverpool won 1–0 when Hunt scored in the 72nd minute.

Liverpool opponents in the semi-final at Villa Park were Chelsea. Before the match, Liverpool manager Bill Shankly found a brochure designed for Chelsea's appearance in the final should they win. He pinned it on the team's dressing room wall and told his players to "stuff those wee cocky south buggers." The first half was goalless, but Liverpool opened the scoring in the 63rd minute when Peter Thompson scored. A penalty by Willie Stevenson secured a 2–0 victory for Liverpool and their place in the final.

== Background ==
The final was held at Wembley Stadium.

The match was Liverpool's third appearance in the final. They had reached the final in 1914, when they lost 1–0 to Burnley, and 1950, when they were beaten 2–0 by Arsenal. Leeds were appearing in their first final; the furthest they had reached before was the quarter-finals of the 1949–50 competition, when they lost to Arsenal. The two League meetings between the teams during the season resulted in a win each. Leeds won the first match 4–2 in August, at Elland Road. The return fixture at Anfield was won 2–1 by Liverpool.

Leeds United went into their final match of the league season with a chance of winning the championship. However, they drew their match with Birmingham City 3–3, which meant they were level on points with Manchester United, who had a match remaining. As Manchester United had a superior goal average only a defeat of 17–0 or greater would result in Leeds being champions. Manchester United lost 2–1 to Aston Villa in their final match and won the title by a goal average of 0.686. Liverpool played Wolverhampton Wanderers a week before the final in their last match of the 1964–65 League season. Shankly rested most of the first-choice players, but Liverpool still won the match 3–1, with goals from Geoff Strong, John Sealey and Alf Arrowsmith, and finished the season in seventh place.

Liverpool manager Bill Shankly was complimentary of Leeds United in the build-up to the final, stating: "Our opponents, Leeds United, have proved themselves beyond doubt to be a great team. Clearly the whole set up at Leeds is one of the finest. But the better the opposition, the better we play." Liverpool's coach was caught in heavy traffic on the way to Wembley Stadium and there was a possibility that the start of the final would have to be delayed. However, they managed to organise an escort when a police motorcycle was spotted and arrived in time for the kick-off. Midfielder Gordon Milne was injured in the days before the final and missed the match. He was replaced by Geoff Strong.

Leeds midfielder Albert Johanneson became the first black player to play in an FA Cup final. However, before walking out onto the pitch Johanneson suffered racial abuse: "When we walked out, all I could hear was a cacophony of Zulu-like noises coming from the terraces. It was dreadful, I could barely hear myself think for those screams. I wanted to run back down the tunnel."

== Match ==
=== First half ===
Both teams started with a 4–4–2 formation and it was Liverpool that kicked the final off. Five minutes into the match, Liverpool defender Gerry Byrne and Leeds captain Bobby Collins collided, which resulted in Byrne breaking his collarbone. As substitutions were not allowed, Byrne decided to continue playing. He was unaware of the extent of his injury, as manager Shankly decided against telling him. The first action of the match was from a Liverpool free-kick, which Willie Stevenson played into the Leeds penalty area. Leeds goalkeeper Gary Sprake and defender Jack Charlton did not deal with it and it went out of play for a Liverpool corner. Liverpool captain Ron Yeats headed the ball on from the corner and striker Ian St John was close to reaching it, before it was gathered by Sprake. Leeds were trying to get winger Albert Johanneson into the match, but a pass to him from Johnny Giles was intercepted by Liverpool defender Tommy Smith. He passed to Ian Callaghan, who advanced before passing to Stevenson, he and Smith exchanged passes before Stevenson passed to Callaghan, whose shot was saved by Sprake.

Liverpool had another attack in the early minutes, but Strong's shot from distance deflected off Charlton for a corner. The opening sixteen minutes saw three Leeds players, Billy Bremner, Charlton and Jim Storrie require treatment as they struggled to impose themselves on the match. Liverpool continued to press forward and an attack was thwarted when St John was dispossessed by Collins, who passed the ball back to Sprake. Leeds striker Alan Peacock fouled Smith following Sprake's clearance and Liverpool were able to build another attack, but St John's subsequent shot went wide of the Leeds goal. Leeds had an attack in the eighteenth minute, but Bremner's pass to Paul Reaney was intercepted by Liverpool goalkeeper Tommy Lawrence. Leeds began to grow in confidence and minutes later, Collins had a chance, but his shot from 35 yards (32 m) went wide of the Liverpool goal. Minutes later, Leeds had another chance to score. Callaghan nullified an attack from Willie Bell and the ball went out for a Leeds corner. However, Peacock's header from the corner went wide.

Liverpool had another chance on 25 minutes. A pass from Callaghan into the Leeds Penalty area was missed by Sprake, but Giles managed to clear the ball before Liverpool striker Roger Hunt could reach it. The game started to become scrappy, both sides struggled to find a way through their opposition defences and were misplacing passes. Three minutes before the end of the half, Liverpool had an attack. Strong passed to Smith, whose first touch caused the ball to bounce upwards, his subsequent shot went over the Leeds goal. A minute before the end of the half, Liverpool had another chance, but Hunt's shot from 25 yards (23 m) was saved by Sprake.

=== Second half ===
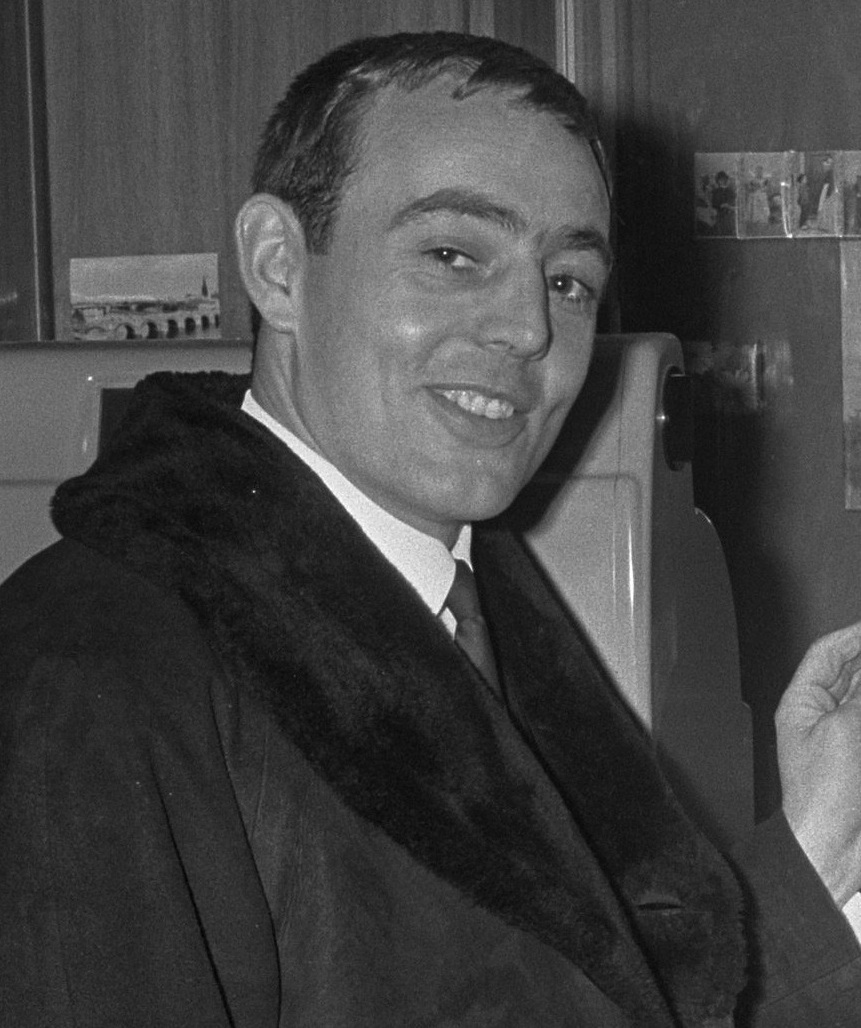
Ian St John scored the winning goal for Liverpool in the 117th minute.

Early in the second half, Liverpool had a chance to score. Callaghan took a throw-in, which he threw to Lawler, his cross into the Leeds penalty area was met by Hunt, but his header went wide of the goal. Liverpool continued to pressure, and only an interception from Bremner prevented a Liverpool goal before Stevenson could reach the ball. Leeds had a free-kick a few minutes later, but Lawrence saved Giles' effort. A few minutes later, St John found Peter Thompson, who ran past Bremner and shot, but it was diverted wide by Sprake. The ball found dropped to Hunt, but his cross was gathered by the Leeds goalkeeper.

After he ran into a photographer chasing an over-hit pass, Charlton received treatment midway through the second half. Leeds had an attack soon after, but after Storrie received the ball from Bremner, his pass went behind the Liverpool goal. Liverpool had more chances, but St John slipped at the back post when a Callaghan cross was diverted towards him. Then Thompson saw a shot saved by Sprake. Leeds reacted to the increased pressure, by moving Bremner to centre-forward and Giles reverting to midfield. Johanneson switched positions with Storrie, moving from the right to the left. Liverpool continued to press for a winner as the half drew to a close, but Thompson and Strong saw shots saved by Sprake. Neither team managed to score before full-time and the match went to extra time, the first time this had happened since the 1947 final.

=== Extra time ===
It only took three minutes of extra time for the first goal to be scored. Thompson passed to Byrne, whose cross was headed into the Leeds goal by Hunt. Liverpool's lead was short-lived as Leeds equalised eight minutes later. Norman Hunter crossed the ball into the Liverpool penalty area from the left-hand side of the pitch. Charlton headed the ball down to Bremner, whose shot beat Lawrence in the Liverpool goal to level the score at 1–1.

Liverpool pressed and Thompson forced Sprake into a number of saves. Leeds had another chance as Bremner had a shot saved by Lawrence after receiving the ball from Reaney. A few minutes later, Strong forced Sprake into a save, which resulted in a corner. St John came close to scoring from the subsequent corner, but his shot went over the Leeds goal. However, with three minutes of extra time remaining, St John scored. Smith found Callaghan, who ran past two Leeds defenders, his cross into the Leeds penalty area was headed into the goal by St John to give Liverpool a 2–1 lead.

=== Details ===
1 May 1965
15:00 BST

Leeds United	1–2 (a.e.t.)	Liverpool
Bremner 100'	(Report)	Hunt 93'; St John 117'

Wembley, London
Attendance: 100,000
Referee: W. Clements (Birmingham)

Leeds United	Liverpool

GK	1	(Wales) Gary Sprake
RB	2	(England) Paul Reaney
CB	5	(England) Jack Charlton
CB	6	(England) Norman Hunter
LB	3	(Scotland) Willie Bell
RM	7	(Republic of Ireland) Johnny Giles
CM	4	(Scotland) Billy Bremner
CM	10	(Scotland) Bobby Collins (c)
LM	11	(South Africa) Albert Johanneson
SS	8	(Scotland) Jim Storrie
ST	9	(England) Alan Peacock
Manager:
(England) Don Revie

GK	1	(Scotland) Tommy Lawrence
RB	2	(England) Chris Lawler
CB	10	(England) Tommy Smith
CB	5	(Scotland) Ron Yeats (c)
LB	3	(England) Gerry Byrne
RM	7	(England) Ian Callaghan
CM	4	(England) Geoff Strong
CM	6	(Scotland) Willie Stevenson
LM	11	(England) Peter Thompson
SS	8	(England) Roger Hunt
ST	9	(Scotland) Ian St John
Manager:
(Scotland) Bill Shankly

Match rules

- 90 minutes.
- 30 minutes of extra-time if necessary.
- Replay if scores still level.

== Post-match ==
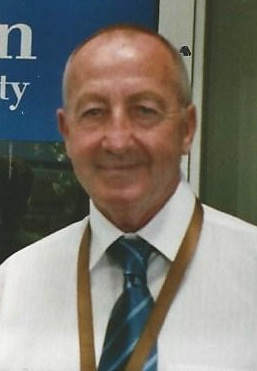
Gerry Byrne, pictured in 2006, played in the final, despite breaking his collarbone in the opening minutes.

Liverpool captain Yeats collected the trophy from Queen Elizabeth II in the Royal box at Wembley Stadium. The victory was the club's first in the competition. Liverpool manager Shankly was delighted with the result and hailed the achievement: "To think a team like Liverpool had never won the FA Cup was unbelievable, so many had prayed for it to happen over all the years, but it had never come to pass. So when we beat Leeds, the emotion was unforgettable." Despite breaking his collarbone in the opening minutes, Liverpool defender Gerry Byrne completed the whole match. Shankly was full of praise for the defender, stating: "Byrne was absolutely fantastic. He played the best game of his life." Byrne was concerned about collecting his medal, stating: "I was worried about going up to collect my medal, so many of our fans wanted to slap me on the back. I had to keep twisting and turning to avoid the congratulations." The FA allowed substitutes for injured players from the 1966-67 FA Cup season.

The final was criticised by the media, with both teams receiving flak. Ken Jones of The Daily Mirror wrote, "Discipline was destroyed by tiredness, determination blunted by the pain of having to run some more. Behind the boredom was the failure of individuals like Leeds left winger Albert Johanneson and Liverpool left winger Peter Thompson, men who could and should have lifted the game with their talent." The Times was slightly less critical of the match: "In spite of much lateral 'method' play it was a tense battle of human qualities. The opening half, in particular, was a quiet prelude. This was the careful shadow boxing that led up to a pulsating finish. Indeed, there was a certain hypnotic element about the whole thing. The fascination lay in trying to assess which side would first break the stalemate."

Liverpool manager Bill Shankly was asked after the match whether Leeds United had failed during the season: "Failed? Second in the championship. Cup finalists. Ninety per cent of managers would pray for 'failures' like that." Leeds manager Don Revie was disappointed to lose, but praised his players' efforts in defeat: "There's no doubt about it, the better side won, but, at least the lads played their guts out for me. He added: "It's a bit disappointing to finish second in both Cup and League, but we have had a wonderful first season back in Division One, and I am very pleased with the team." Captain Collins echoed his manager's sentiments: "We have had a great season, but lost both honours. We shall be having a go again next season."

The Liverpool team were welcomed back to the city by approximately half a million people, as the open-top bus drove through the city to the town hall. Three days after the final, Liverpool faced Italian team Inter Milan in the first leg of the semi-finals of the European Cup. Before the match kicked off, Byrne and Gordon Milne paraded the FA Cup around the stadium. Liverpool won the match 3–1, but they did not perform as well in the second leg at the San Siro, as they lost 3–0 to exit the competition 4–3 on aggregate.
