= Mary Webb School and Science College =

Location
- Bogey Lane; Pontesbury, Shropshire, SY5 0TG; England; 52.6472°N 2.8826°W

Information
- Type: Academy
- Established: 1957
- Trust: Central Shropshire Academy Trust
- Department for Education URN: 146509 Tables
- Ofsted: Reports
- Chair: M Cribb
- Headteacher: Peter Lowe-Werrell
- Gender: Coeducational
- Age: 11 to 16
- Enrolment: 552 (2017)
- Publication: Webberzine
- Website: http://www.marywebbschool.com/

Mary Webb School and Science College is a coeducational secondary school located in Pontesbury, Shropshire, England.

Founded in 1957, it was originally titled Pontesbury Secondary Modern School. In 1977, following the abolition of the tripartite system, the school became a comprehensive school. The Mary Webb School, named after the novelist and poet of the same name, was designated a specialist Science College in 2003.

Previously a community school administered by Shropshire Council, in January 2019 Mary Webb School converted to academy status. The school is now sponsored by the Central Shropshire Academy Trust.

== Academics ==
The school received a rating of "good" (overall) and "outstanding" in the area of leadership and management from Ofsted during the May 2015 inspection.

== Former pupils ==
Mary Webb School

- David Edwards, footballer, Reading F.C. and Wales

Pontesbury Secondary Modern School

- Peter Wall, footballer
