= 1966 FA Charity Shield =

Liverpool	Everton
1	0
- Date: 13 August 1966
- Venue: Goodison Park, Liverpool
- Referee: Jack Taylor
- Attendance: 63,329

The 1966 FA Charity Shield was a Merseyside derby between Liverpool and Everton at Goodison Park. Liverpool won the Football League and Everton won the 1966 FA Cup Final to qualify for the charity shield. Before the game, Roger Hunt and Ray Wilson paraded the World Cup, the FA Cup and the Football League Trophy around Goodison Park. Liverpool won the game with a goal from Roger Hunt in the ninth minute of the first half.

== Match details ==
13 August 1966

Liverpool	1–0	Everton
Hunt 9'	Report

Goodison Park, Liverpool
Attendance: 63,329

Liverpool	Everton

GK	1	(Scotland) Tommy Lawrence
RB	2	(England) Chris Lawler
CB	4	(England) Tommy Smith
CB	5	(Scotland) Ron Yeats (c)
LB	3	(England) Gerry Byrne
RM	7	(England) Ian Callaghan
CM	10	(England) Geoff Strong
CM	6	(Scotland) Willie Stevenson
LM	11	(England) Peter Thompson
SS	8	(England) Roger Hunt
ST	9	(Scotland) Ian St. John
Manager:
(Scotland) Bill Shankly

1	(England) Gordon West
2	(England) Tommy Wright
3	(England) Ray Wilson
4	(Scotland) Jimmy Gabriel
5	(England) Brian Labone (c)
6	(England) Gerry Glover
7	(Scotland) Alex Scott
8	(England) Mike Trebilcock
9	(Scotland) Alex Young
10	(England) Colin Harvey
11	(England) Derek Temple
Manager:
(England) Harry Catterick

== See also ==
- 1965–66 Football League
- 1965–66 FA Cup
