= Tommy Smith (footballer, born 1945) =

English footballer (1945–2019)

Tommy Smith MBE
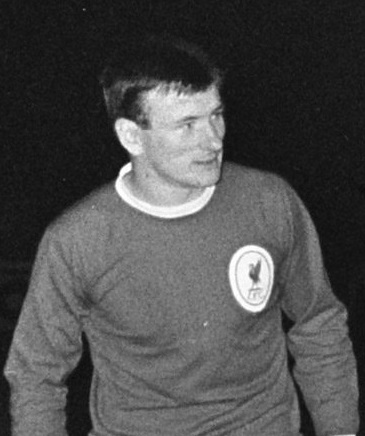
- Smith pictured in October 1966.

Personal information
- Full name: Thomas Smith
- Date of birth: 5 April 1945
- Place of birth: Liverpool, England
- Date of death: 12 April 2019 (aged 74)
- Place of death: Crosby, England
- Height: 5 ft 10 in (1.78 m)
- Position: Defender

Youth career
- 1960–1962: Liverpool

Senior career*
Years	Team	Apps	(Gls)
1962–1978	Liverpool	467	(36)
1976	→ Tampa Bay Rowdies (loan)	17	(0)
1978	Los Angeles Aztecs	12	(0)
1978–1979	Swansea City	36	(2)
Total		532	(38)

International career
1965–1968	England U23	10	(2)
1971	England	1	(0)

Managerial career
- 1978: Los Angeles Aztecs
- 1987: Caernarfon Town F.C.
- * Club domestic league appearances and goals

Thomas Smith MBE (5 April 1945 – 12 April 2019) was an English footballer, who played as a defender at Liverpool for 16 years from 1962 to 1978. Known for his uncompromising defensive style, manager Bill Shankly once said of him: "Tommy Smith wasn't born, he was quarried".

Nicknamed the "Anfield Iron", Smith was a central defender for most of his Liverpool career, and his most memorable moment for the club probably came when he scored Liverpool's second goal in the 1977 European Cup final against Borussia Mönchengladbach. Smith played once for England in 1971, and also played at club level for Tampa Bay Rowdies, Los Angeles Aztecs and Swansea City.

== Club career ==
=== Liverpool ===
Smith was born in Liverpool on Thursday, 5 April 1945; he was an only child. His father died of pneumonia in 1959. Brought up a Catholic, he stopped attending church after witnessing the local priest stagger out of the house drunk after he came to the family home to offer his condolences. Smith joined the groundstaff at Anfield the following year, becoming a schoolboy associate of Liverpool, the club he had supported all his life. Initially a centre-forward, he impressed manager Bill Shankly enough to bypass two of the club's four reserve teams to immediately play for the 'A' team. He further made an impression in the 1961–62 pre-season when he beat imposing centre-half Ron Yeats to a header to score in training. He turned professional in the summer of 1962, on wages of £18-a-week.

He made his debut for the "Reds" on 8 May 1963, replacing the injured Jimmy Melia in a 5–1 home victory over Birmingham City. However he made no further appearances throughout the rest of the 1962–63 season, and did not feature in the 1963–64 First Division title winning season. He married Susanne in July 1964, following a four-year courtship.

He scored his first goal for Liverpool in his second match, playing at inside-left in a 3–2 defeat to Blackburn Rovers at Ewood Park on 29 August 1964. He kept his place for the following game, and again scored as Liverpool beat Leeds United 2–1. He was returned to the reserves after two more appearances, before returning to the first team as a defender in a 3–0 win over Belgian side Anderlecht in the European Cup; after the match Shankly said that "The game marked out Tommy Smith as a fine player. The boy has arrived". He ended the 1964–65 season with four goals in 25 league games, spent mostly at right-half. He also played in every game of Liverpool's FA Cup run as they beat West Bromwich Albion, Stockport County (after a replay), Bolton Wanderers, Leicester City (after a replay), and Chelsea to reach the 1965 FA Cup Final against Leeds United at Wembley Stadium; Liverpool won the game 2–1 to lift the trophy for the first time in the club's history.

He played in the 1965 FA Charity Shield against Manchester United at Old Trafford, where a 2–2 draw meant that two clubs shared the trophy. Liverpool then recovered from a loss and a defeat to Sheffield United in the opening two games of the 1965–66 season to go on a strong run of form that included convincing victories over West Ham United (5–1), Merseyside derby rivals Everton (5–0), Nottingham Forest (4–0), Northampton Town (5–0), and Blackburn Rovers (5–2); Smith managed to score against both Everton and Blackburn. They went unbeaten for a total of 18 games from October to late February, and then lost just one of their final ten games to secure the league title with a six-point lead over runners-up Leeds United. They had conceded just 34 goals, the lowest total of any team in the Football League. Liverpool also reached the 1966 European Cup Winners' Cup Final to face German side Borussia Dortmund at Hampden Park, but Smith admitted that his side "lacked our usual edge and appeared disjointed" as they lost the game 2–1 in extra-time.

Smith played in the 1966 FA Charity Shield against Everton at Goodison Park, helping his side to a clean sheet and a 1–0 victory. This would prove to be the last trophy for five years however, despite a good start to the 1966–67 season that included a 5–0 win over Leeds United. Their form slipped in the second half of the campaign, as they fell to fifth place. Liverpool were more consistent across the 1967–68 campaign, but ended up in third place, three points behind champions Manchester City. They came even closer in the 1968–69 season, where a 0–0 draw with Leeds at Anfield was enough to win Leeds the title, whilst Liverpool went on to finish as runners-up.

Smith was given the honour of club captaincy and led the team to the 1971 FA Cup final, which Liverpool lost to Arsenal 2–1 after extra time. In 1972–73, Smith skippered the team to their first double success of the League and UEFA Cup, when they topped the league by three points over Arsenal and beat Borussia Mönchengladbach in the UEFA Cup final 3–2 on aggregate.

In November 1973, after Smith complained to Shankly at being left out of the team for a game, he had the big disappointment of losing the captaincy to Emlyn Hughes. This resulted in Smith almost leaving Liverpool. Earlier, Hughes had told Shankly to remove the captaincy from Smith and give it to a younger man. When he returned, he was also moved from his favoured central defensive role to full back. Although Smith eventually settled his differences with Shankly satisfactorily, a long-running feud developed between Smith and Hughes which led to some tension in the Liverpool dressing room, where the older players remained loyal to Smith and voiced their dislike of Hughes's chattiness (and parsimony in the pub). In 2008, Smith alleged his feud with Hughes started eighteen months prior, when he said in his autobiography that on 8 May 1972, Hughes told him that he had been speaking to a number of Arsenal players who were "willing to throw a match for £50 a man." Liverpool subsequently failed to win the vital match at Highbury, which allowed Derby County to win the title instead. Smith wrote that he was disgusted with what Hughes said and never spoke to him off the field again. Smith maintained that the only witness was Ian Callaghan. Smith said he never told Shankly because it would have "broken his heart".

Hughes went on to lift the FA Cup as captain in 1974 after Liverpool comprehensively beat Newcastle United 3–0 in one of the most one-sided of Wembley finals. Having lost the captaincy Smith missed out on receiving the trophy from Princess Anne, he did have the pleasure of setting up the third and final goal for the young striker Kevin Keegan, a stunning team goal.

As Smith's twilight years approached, he made fewer appearances and with the emergence of youngsters Phil Thompson and Phil Neal as central defender and full back respectively, though he still played an important role as Liverpool managed another League and UEFA Cup double in 1976, when he appeared 24 times in the league and played a left-back role in both legs of the UEFA final. Smith spent the close season in the summer of 1976 in the United States, playing 17 games on loan as a defender for the Tampa Bay Rowdies, where he continued his trademark toughness and earned the nickname, "The Tank".

Back in Liverpool, Smith was left out of the side that started the 1976–77 season but, when Thompson picked up an injury in Liverpool's 1–0 win over Newcastle in the March of that season, he was recalled and kept his place as the side went on to retain the League title. Smith then played in the 1977 FA Cup Final which Liverpool lost to bitter rivals Manchester United, thereby losing the chance of a treble, with the club's first European Cup final in Rome due a few days later. Despite the disappointment of the defeat at Wembley, Liverpool played magnificently to beat old UEFA Cup foes Borussia Mönchengladbach 3–1, with Smith scoring a towering second-half header from a corner taken by Steve Heighway to make the score 2–1. It was his first goal of the season, and the 48th and final for the club. The BBC commentator Barry Davies described the goal with the words "It's Tommy Smith! Oh what an end to a career."

Smith decided to delay his retirement and played a further season for Liverpool but missed the successful retention of the European Cup after he dropped a pickaxe on his foot, breaking his toe. He picked up a runners-up medal in Liverpool's first ever League Cup final after they lost a replay to Nottingham Forest.

=== Later career ===
He spent the summer of 1978 in the NASL with the Los Angeles Aztecs. He started as a player but became player/head coach halfway through the season. At the end of the season he was replaced by Dutch legend Rinus Michels.

Smith left for Swansea City in 1978 after 638 games for Liverpool, receiving the MBE for services to football that same year. The Swans were being managed by his former Liverpool teammate John Toshack at the time and Smith helped Swansea to promotion from the Third Division. He retired from playing in 1979.

== International career ==
Smith won ten caps for the England under-23 team, his first coming in a 0–0 draw with Czechoslovakia at Elland Road. He scored two goals, both penalties, against Scotland and Austria. He won just one full cap for England on 19 May 1971, in a 0–0 draw with Wales in a British Home Championship game at Wembley.

== Style of play ==
Smith used psychological ploys to threaten and intimidate opposition players. That said, he certainly had the respect of his peers, with fellow professional Jack Charlton once saying "Tommy Smith was easily the hardest player I faced. I ran into him once and he knocked every ounce of breath out of me. I tried to get up and look like he hadn't hurt me, but he had."

Manager Bill Shankly once said of him: "Tommy Smith wasn't born, he was quarried".

Smith was nicknamed "The Anfield Iron" and it was said that "Merseyside mothers kept his picture on the mantelpiece to keep their kids away from the fire". A common story stated that he "missed the 1978 European Cup Final after tripping on a pickaxe and injuring his foot. The pickaxe was a write-off".

== Later life ==
Smith had a brief spell as a youth coach at Liverpool. He wrote a weekly column for the Liverpool Echo for 35 years from 1979 until August 2014. In March 2008, he published his autobiography, Anfield Iron. He bought the lease to The Cavern Club in 1980, but sold it on after a few years of minimal profits.

Smith was still held in high regard amongst Liverpool fans long after his retirement, as he was voted into 25th place in the official club website poll "100 Players Who Shook The Kop".

In 1988, Smith caused controversy after stating in an interview with the author Dave Hill that Howard Gayle "Suffered from a black man's attitude towards the white man. See, everybody thinks whites have an attitude towards blacks. In reality it's blacks who have a problem with the whites... I used to call Howard the 'White Nigger'. Now that is a compliment. It was the only way I could find to describe that I thought he was OK." Smith then went on to comment to Hill that "I'm not prejudiced but if a coon moved in next door, I'd move, like most white people would. If my daughter came home with a nigger, I'd go mad. But I'm only being truthful and normal." Smith intended to sue Hill, but found he had no grounds to take legal action as Hill had recorded all of Smith's comments on tape during the interview.

== Health problems ==
On 6 June 2007 Smith suffered a heart attack in his garden which required a hospital stay and a six-way heart bypass.

In his later years, Smith had a hip replacement operation (both knees and an elbow were also made of plastic) and also began to suffer from arthritis to the extent that he could not work and often needed a wheelchair or walking stick and had to claim incapacity benefit. Smith had his benefit payments stopped for a short time after he managed to take a penalty on the Wembley pitch at half-time during the 1996 FA Cup Final between Liverpool and Manchester United; he stated that "I couldn't believe they would do that, I was getting money for charity. I only kicked the ball once."

Smith was diagnosed with Alzheimer's disease in October 2014.

== Death ==
Tommy Smith died, at the age of 74, in his sleep at 4.30pm on 12 April 2019 at Green Heyes nursing home in Crosby after "growing increasingly frail and suffering from a variety of ailments over the last three months", according to his daughter.

== Statistics ==
Appearances and goals by club, season and competition
Club	Season	League			FA Cup		Other		Total	
Club	Season	Division	Apps	Goals	Apps	Goals	Apps	Goals	Apps	Goals
Liverpool	1962–63	First Division	1	0	0	0	0	0	1	0
Liverpool	1963–64	First Division	0	0	0	0	0	0	0	0
Liverpool	1964–65	First Division	25	4	8	0	7	0	40	4
Liverpool	1965–66	First Division	42	3	1	0	10	1	53	4
Liverpool	1966–67	First Division	42	1	4	0	6	0	51	1
Liverpool	1967–68	First Division	36	3	7	1	8	2	51	6
Liverpool	1968–69	First Division	42	6	4	1	5	0	51	7
Liverpool	1969–70	First Division	36	4	3	0	6	3	45	7
Liverpool	1970–71	First Division	41	2	7	0	13	1	61	3
Liverpool	1971–72	First Division	37	6	3	0	5	0	45	6
Liverpool	1972–73	First Division	33	2	2	0	14	1	49	3
Liverpool	1973–74	First Division	34	1	7	0	8	0	49	1
Liverpool	1974–75	First Division	36	2	0	0	9	1	45	3
Liverpool	1975–76	First Division	24	0	2	0	9	0	35	0
Liverpool	1976–77	First Division	16	0	4	0	8	1	28	1
Liverpool	1977–78	First Division	22	2	0	0	12	0	34	2
Liverpool	Total		467	36	52	2	120	10	639	48
Tampa Bay Rowdies (loan)	1976	NASL	17	0	0	0	0	0	17	0
Los Angeles Aztecs	1978	NASL	12	0	0	0	0	0	12	0
Swansea City	1978–79	Third Division	36	2	4	0	3	0	43	2
Career total			532	38	56	2	123	10	711	50

== Honours ==
Liverpool

- Football League First Division: 1965–66, 1972–73, 1975–76, 1976–77
- FA Cup: 1964–65, 1973–74; runner-up: 1970–71, 1976–77
- FA Charity Shield: 1965 (shared), 1966, 1974, 1977 (shared)
- European Cup: 1976–77, 1977–78
- UEFA Cup: 1972–73, 1975–76
- UEFA Super Cup: 1977
- Football League Cup runner-up: 1977–78
