= 1965 FA Charity Shield =

- Event: FA Charity Shield
Manchester United	Liverpool
2	2
- Date: 14 August 1965
- Venue: Old Trafford, Manchester
- Referee: Jim Finney
- Attendance: 48,502

The 1965 FA Charity Shield was the 43rd FA Charity Shield, an annual football match played between the winners of the previous season's First Division and FA Cup competitions. The match was played on 14 August 1965 at Old Trafford, Manchester and contested by Manchester United, who had won the 1964–65 First Division, and Liverpool, who had won the 1964–65 FA Cup. The teams played out a 2–2 draw and shared the Charity Shield.

== Match details ==
14 August 1965
15:00 BST

Manchester United	2–2	Liverpool
Best 28'; Herd 81'	Report	Stevenson 38'; Yeats 86'

Old Trafford, Manchester
Attendance: 48,502
Referee: Jim Finney

Manchester United	Liverpool

GK	1	(Republic of Ireland) Pat Dunne
RB	2	(Republic of Ireland) Shay Brennan
LB	3	(Republic of Ireland) Tony Dunne
RH	4	(Scotland) Paddy Crerand
CH	5	(Republic of Ireland) Noel Cantwell (c)
LH	6	(England) Nobby Stiles
OR	7	(Northern Ireland) George Best
IR	8	(England) Bobby Charlton
CF	9	(Scotland) David Herd
IL	10	(Scotland) Denis Law	(substituted off) 18'
OL	11	(England) John Aston, Jr.
Substitutes:
FW	12	(England) Willie Anderson	(substituted on) 18'
Manager:
(Scotland) Matt Busby

GK	1	(Scotland) Tommy Lawrence
RB	2	(England) Chris Lawler
CB	10	(England) Tommy Smith
CB	5	(Scotland) Ron Yeats (c)
LB	3	(England) Gerry Byrne
RM	7	(England) Ian Callaghan
CM	4	(England) Gordon Milne
CM	6	(Scotland) Willie Stevenson
LM	11	(England) Geoff Strong
SS	8	(England) Roger Hunt
ST	9	(Scotland) Ian St. John
Manager:
(Scotland) Bill Shankly

Match rules

- 90 minutes, no extra time
- One named substitute
- Maximum of one substitution

== See also ==
- Liverpool F.C.–Manchester United F.C. rivalry
