= Bowland Bridge =

Village in Cumbria, England

Coordinates: 54.29°N 02.90°W

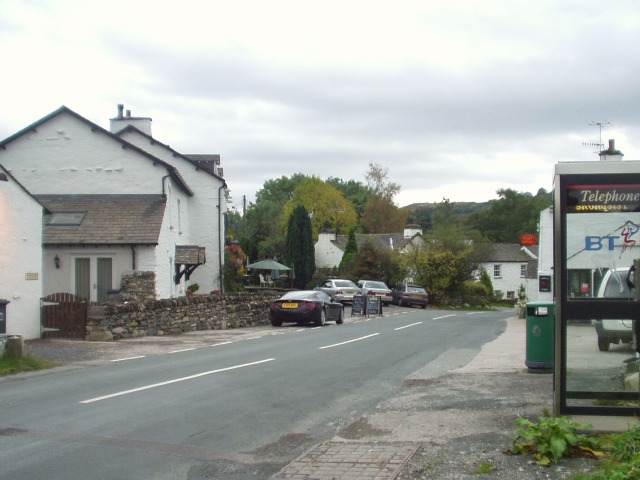
- Bowland Bridge village

- Location in South Lakeland Location within Cumbria
- OS grid reference: SD4189
- Civil parish: Crosthwaite and Lyth
- Unitary authority: Westmorland and Furness
- Ceremonial county: Cumbria
- Region: North West
- Country: England
- Sovereign state: United Kingdom
- Post town: GRANGE-OVER-SANDS
- Postcode district: LA11
- Dialling code: 01539
- Police: Cumbria
- Fire: Cumbria
- Ambulance: North West
- UK Parliament: Westmorland and Lonsdale

Bowland Bridge is a village in Cumbria, England. It was in the South Lakeland district until 2023 and is now in the unitary authority area of Westmorland and Furness. The village is situated on the River Winster, which forms the boundary between the historic counties of Westmorland and Lancashire. The greater part of the village lies on the Westmorland side of the river.

The village formerly had a post office and shop and has a 17th-century inn, the Hare and Hounds, which was operated in the 1990s by the footballer Peter Thompson. It reopened in 2021 as a combination gastropub and local pub, and was singled out for its food and as a hotel, but closed in November 2025 after rising costs made it unviable. An application is pending to have the pub protected as an asset of community value.
