= Gerry Glover =

English footballer

Personal information
- Full name: Gerard John Glover
- Date of birth: 27 September 1946 (age 80)
- Place of birth: Liverpool, England
- Position: Midfielder

Senior career*
Years	Team	Apps	(Gls)
1964–1967	Everton	3	(0)
1967–1968	Mansfield Town	19	(0)
1968–1969	Northwich Victoria		
1969–1972	Runcorn		
1972	South Liverpool		
Total		22	(0)
- * Club domestic league appearances and goals

Gerard John Glover (born 27 September 1946) is an English former professional footballer who played in the Football League for Everton and Mansfield Town.
