= Gordon Milne =

English footballer (born 1937)

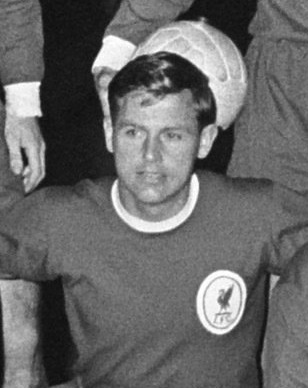
- Milne in 1966

Personal information
- Date of birth: 29 March 1937 (age 89)
- Place of birth: Preston, England
- Position: Midfielder

Youth career
- Preston Amateurs

Senior career*
Years	Team	Apps	(Gls)
- Morecambe
1956–1960	Preston North End	83	(3)
1960–1967	Liverpool	236	(17)
1967–1970	Blackpool	64	(4)
1970–1972	Wigan Athletic	73	(4)
Total		452	(28)

International career
1963–1964	England	14	(0)

Managerial career
- 1970–1972: Wigan Athletic
- 1972–1974: England U18
- 1974–1981: Coventry City
- 1982–1986: Leicester City
- 1987–1993: Beşiktaş
- 1994: Nagoya Grampus Eight
- 1996–1997: Bursaspor
- 1998–1999: Trabzonspor
- * Club domestic league appearances and goals

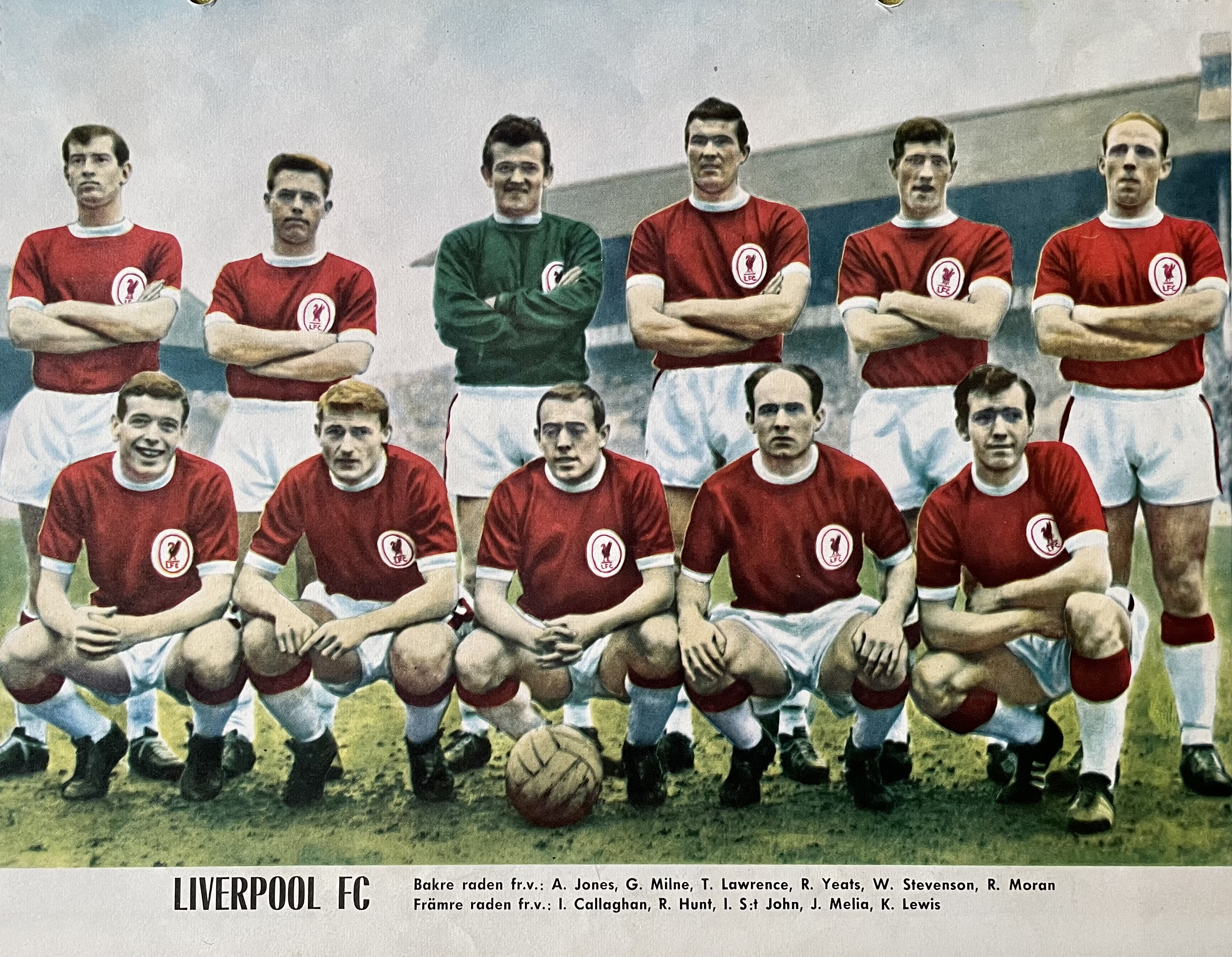
Liverpool F.C. at 1963 with following players, from left standing: Allan Jones, Gordon Milne, Tommy Lawrence, Ron Yeats (captain), Willie Stevenson, Ronnie Moran; front row: Ian Callaghan, Roger Hunt, Ian St John, Jimmy Melia and Kevin Lewis.

Gordon Milne (born 29 March 1937) is an English former football player and manager.

== Personal life ==
Gordon Milne was born in Preston, Lancashire, England and is the son of the Scottish former Preston player Jimmy Milne and Jessie Milne.

== Club career ==
Milne had a successful playing career with amateur side Morecambe, Preston North End, Liverpool (1960–1967), Blackpool (1967–1970) and Wigan Athletic (1970).

He was one of Bill Shankly's first signings, when he moved from Preston North End for £16,000 in August 1960. He made his debut in the 1–0 2nd Division defeat at Anfield by Southampton on 31 August 1960, he scored his first goal in the 10th minute of a 2–1 league win over Newcastle United at St James' Park on 20 September 1961.

Milne was a successful right-half for Liverpool during the 1960s and played a prominent role in Liverpool's rise from the old Second Division, forming a partnership with Gerry Byrne. While at Anfield, he won First Division Championship medals in 1963–64 and 1965–66, a Second Division Championship medal in 1961–62 and two shared Charity Shield triumphs in 1964 and 1965.

Milne missed the 1965 FA Cup final, in which Liverpool triumphed, through injury, but played a major role just a few days later as the Reds entertained Inter Milan in the first leg of the European Cup semi final. Bill Shankly sent out the injured pair Milne and Gerry Byrne to parade the F.A Cup before the kick-off. The Reds went on to win the match 3–1 but were beaten 3–0 in the return leg.

== International career ==
Milne was selected to represent England at wing-half 14 times making his debut for Alf Ramsey's team in a prestigious friendly with Brazil at Wembley in a game that took place on 8 May 1963 and finished one-all.

== Managerial career ==
Milne turned to management and coaching with Wigan Athletic as player-manager in January 1970. He managed Wigan from 1970 to 1972, making 73 Northern Premier League appearances for the club, and guided them to a league title and an FA Cup run, which ended with a narrow defeat to Manchester City at Maine Road.

Milne also became the part-time manager of the England Youth team in 1972, helping them to win the European Youth Championship that year.

Milne joined Joe Mercer at Coventry City as team manager in June 1972, taking full control in 1974, upon Mercer's elevation to the Board. He was shortlisted for the England management role following the departure of Sir Alf Ramsey, but was overlooked in favour of Don Revie. He continued at Coventry until 1981, producing several exciting teams and securing the club's First Division status. The 1977–78 season saw Coventry's most exciting top-flight team. Gordon Milne settled on an attacking 4–2–4 formation. A side containing Tommy Hutchison, Mick Ferguson, Ian Wallace, Terry Yorath, Graham Oakey, Bobby MacDonald and Jim Blyth played attacking football that swept many teams aside, often by large margins of victory.

Milne became boss at Leicester City in August 1982, winning promotion in 1982–83 and staying until 1986. He managed Beşiktaş in Turkey for seven years, from 1987 to 1993 (where he won three successive league championship titles during the early 1990s, including an undefeated run in the 1991–92 season). He succeeded in creating one of the most successful periods in the history of Beşiktaş and is still a legend for the Beşiktaş fans. He also managed Nagoya Grampus Eight in Japan, before returning to Turkey to take charge of Bursaspor (1996–1997), where he managed the club to its highest ever finish in the Turkish league, and then Trabzonspor (1998–1999).

Milne then accepted the role of Director of Football at Newcastle United, and worked alongside manager Bobby Robson between 1999 and 2004.

After a spell as chief executive of the League Managers Association, Milne was employed as Director of Football at Beşiktaş in 2006.

== Managerial statistics ==
Team	From	To	Record				
Team	From	To	G	W	D	L	Win %
Wigan Athletic	1 August 1970	15 June 1972	88	54	23	11	61.36
Coventry City	1 May 1974	31 May 1981	303	98	92	113	32.34
Leicester City	2 August 1982	3 June 1986	177	63	40	74	35.59
Beşiktaş	16 August 1987	19 December 1993	276	176	66	34	63.77
Nagoya Grampus Eight	1 January 1994	31 December 1994	42	14	0	28	33.33
Bursaspor	10 August 1996	24 May 1997	34	17	8	9	50.00
Trabzonspor	8 August 1998	30 May 1999	34	17	7	10	50.00
Total			954	439	236	279	46.02
