= Geoff Strong =

English footballer

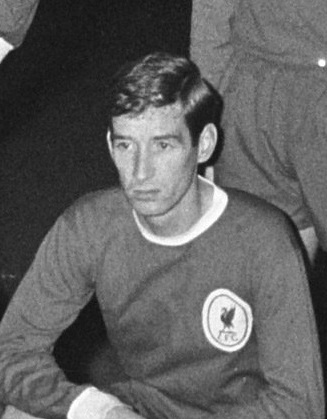
- Strong pictured in 1966

Personal information
- Full name: Geoffrey Hugh Strong
- Date of birth: 19 September 1937
- Place of birth: Kirkheaton, Northumberland, England
- Date of death: 17 June 2013 (aged 75)
- Place of death: Southport, Lancashire, England
- Position: Inside forward

Senior career*
Years	Team	Apps	(Gls)
1954–1957	Stanley United		
1957–1964	Arsenal	125	(69)
1964–1970	Liverpool	155	(29)
1970–1971	Coventry City	33	(0)
Total		313	(98)
- * Club domestic league appearances and goals

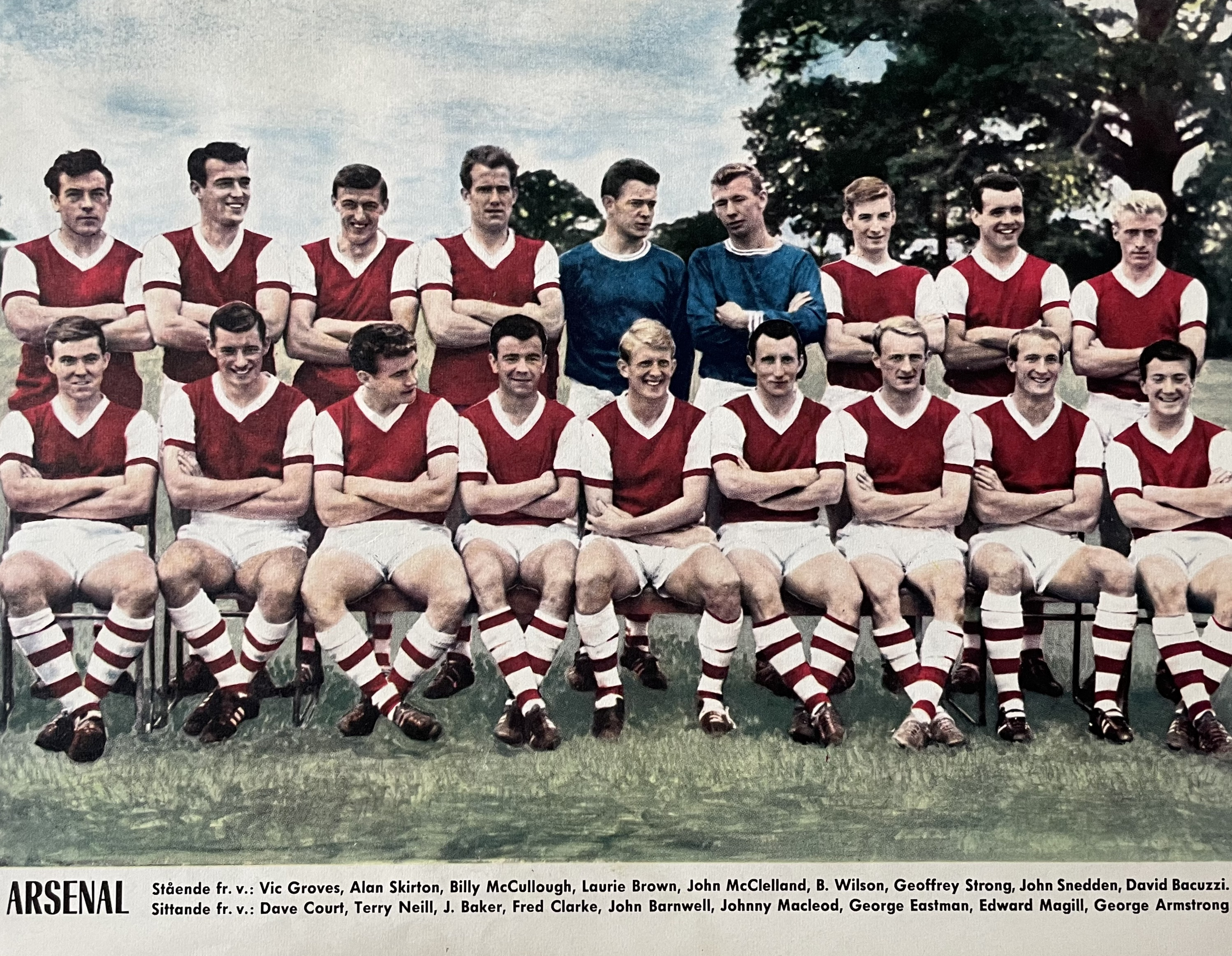
Arsenal F.C. in 1964, Geoffrey Strong standing third player from the right.

Geoffrey Hugh Strong (19 September 1937 – 17 June 2013) was an English professional footballer who scored 98 goals from 313 appearances in the Football League playing for Arsenal, Liverpool and Coventry City. He began his career as an inside forward, but went on to occupy every outfield position.

== Early life and career ==
Strong was born in Kirkheaton, Northumberland, in 1937. He trained as a machine-tool fitter and played amateur football for his local club, Stanley United. Strong's 14 goals from his first four appearances of the 1957–58 Northern League season did not pass unnoticed, and in November 1957, he signed amateur forms with Football League First Division club Arsenal.

== Arsenal ==
Strong played mainly in the Gunners youth and reserve sides and his first-team debut was delayed by his call-up for National Service in April 1960. He finally started for the first team against Newcastle United on 17 September 1960, two days before his 23rd birthday; he scored the last goal as Arsenal won 5–0.

Strong played 19 league games that season, scoring ten goals, and appeared in 20 the following season, 1961–62, before finally becoming an automatic first-choice in 1962–63. Playing as an inside forward or centre forward, Strong formed a lethal attacking partnership with Joe Baker and became a regular goalscorer for the club – his record being 31 in all competitions in 1963–64; Baker and Strong together scored 62 that season.

However, despite Strong and Baker's goalscoring efforts, Arsenal were going through a barren patch; the best league position they achieved during this period was seventh, and they made little impact in the FA Cup. Strong made it clear he wanted to move to a more successful club. Although he was still a regular starter at the start of the 1964–65 season, Arsenal sold him for £40,000 to Liverpool in November 1964. He had scored 77 goals from 137 matches for the Gunners.

== Liverpool ==
Strong was thrown straight into the Liverpool side and made his debut on 7 November 1964, in a 1–1 league draw with Fulham at Craven Cottage. His first goal came a month later on 5 December in a 5–1 defeat of Burnley at Turf Moor.

After just 16 appearances in a red shirt Strong's wish for more success came to fruition, as Liverpool won the FA Cup for the first time in the club's 73-year history. Strong, who was now used as a utility man, made his first appearance in the competition for Liverpool in the final at Wembley, deputising for the injured Gordon Milne as the Reds beat Leeds United 2–1 after extra time. He played in the semi-final of the European Cup, as Liverpool lost to Inter Milan 4–3 on aggregate having led 3-1 from the first leg in Italy.

Strong went on to play in almost every outfield position over the next six seasons, but he eventually settled in at left back after Gerry Byrne retired. Strong was part of the side that won the 1965–66 Football League title, six points clear of Leeds United. He, however, missed the 1966 Cup Winners' Cup final, which Liverpool lost 2–1 to Borussia Dortmund at Hampden Park, through an injury that he picked up in the semi-final second leg win over Celtic. Strong had a major influence in the Reds reaching their first European final, as it was he who scored the winner, a towering header, even though he was carrying a leg injury.

Liverpool went trophyless for a few seasons after the 1966 title win, and following a 1–0 defeat at the hands of Second Division Watford in the sixth round of the 1969–70 FA Cup, Bill Shankly decided that changes had to be made. The old guard had to be replaced by a younger generation, and Strong was one of the players that was caught up in the cull. After 201 matches and 33 goals, Strong left Liverpool in July 1970 for Coventry City for a £30,000 fee.

== Coventry City ==
He spent a single season at Highfield Road and his experience was helpful in Noel Cantwell's young team. He formed an excellent partnership with a young Jeff Blockley and the Sky Blues set a club record by conceding only 38 league goals. He retired from playing in 1972.

== Retirement ==
After retiring, he left the game completely, and for a while ran his own hotel furnishing business; he also co-owned a pub with former Liverpool player Ian Callaghan. In the 2006 Liverpool F.C. website poll, "100 Players Who Shook The Kop", Strong was voted in at number 95.

Strong, who had suffered from Alzheimer's disease for some years, died at the age of 75 in a Southport care home in the morning of 17 June 2013.

== Honours ==
Liverpool

- Football League First Division: 1965–66
- FA Cup: 1964–65
- FA Charity Shield: 1965, 1966
