= Peter Wall (footballer) =

English footballer (1944–2024)

Personal information
- Full name: Peter Thomas Wall
- Date of birth: 13 September 1944
- Place of birth: Shrewsbury, England
- Date of death: 30 October 2024 (aged 80)
- Height: 5 ft 11 in (1.80 m)
- Position: Full-back

Senior career*
Years	Team	Apps	(Gls)
1963–1965	Shrewsbury Town	18	(0)
1965–1967	Wrexham	22	(1)
1967–1970	Liverpool	31	(0)
1970–1977	Crystal Palace	177	(4)
1972–1973	→ Leyton Orient (loan)	10	(0)
1977	St. Louis Stars	18	(0)
1978–1980	California Surf	74	(3)
Total		350	(8)

Managerial career
- 1979–1981: California Surf
- 1982–1987: Los Angeles Lazers
- * Club domestic league appearances and goals

Peter Thomas Wall (13 September 1944 – 30 October 2024) was an English professional footballer who played in England and the United States as a full-back. He subsequently became a coach in the United States.

== Playing career ==
Wall was born on 13 September 1944 in Shrewsbury, although the nearby village of Westbury has also been stated as his birthplace. After leaving education at Pontesbury Secondary Modern School, he signed a professional contract with Shrewsbury Town in 1963, making 18 league appearances during the next two seasons. He signed for Wrexham in 1965, and made 22 league appearances over the next two seasons. Wall moved to Liverpool in 1967, and over the next three seasons made 31 league appearances. Wall then signed for Crystal Palace, where he made 177 league appearances over seven seasons. While at Crystal Palace, Wall spent the 1972–73 season on loan with Leyton Orient. Wall later played in the NASL for the St. Louis Stars and the California Surf.

== Coaching career ==
Following his retirement as a player following the end of the 1980 season, Wall became manager of the California Surf for the 1981 season, and the Los Angeles Lazers between 1982 and 1987.

== Personal life and death ==
After his coaching career in America, Wall returned to Shropshire, where he was living in Oswestry and employed at motor dealers Furrow's in 2008.

Wall died on 30 October 2024, aged 80. A grandfather, he was survived by his wife, Kathleen. His funeral took place at All Saints' Church, Worthen, Shropshire, where he was buried, on 2 December 2024.
