= Willie Stevenson =

Scottish footballer and manager (1939–2025)

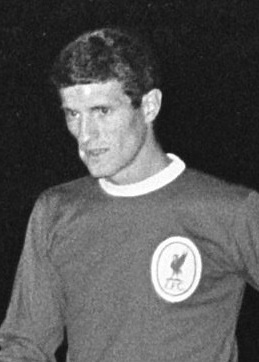
- Stevenson in 1966

Personal information
- Full name: William Stevenson
- Date of birth: 26 October 1939
- Place of birth: Leith, Scotland
- Date of death: 27 May 2025 (aged 85)
- Position: Left half

Youth career
- Edina Hearts

Senior career*
Years	Team	Apps	(Gls)
1956–1958	Dalkeith Thistle		
1958–1962	Rangers	72	(1)
1962–1967	Liverpool	188	(15)
1967–1973	Stoke City	94	(5)
1971	→ Hellenic (loan)	5	(0)
1973–1974	Tranmere Rovers	20	(0)
1974	Limerick	4	(0)
1974	Vancouver Whitecaps	19	(0)
1974–1975	Macclesfield Town	32	(0)
Total		434	(21)

International career
1959	Scottish League XI	1	(0)
- * Club domestic league appearances and goals

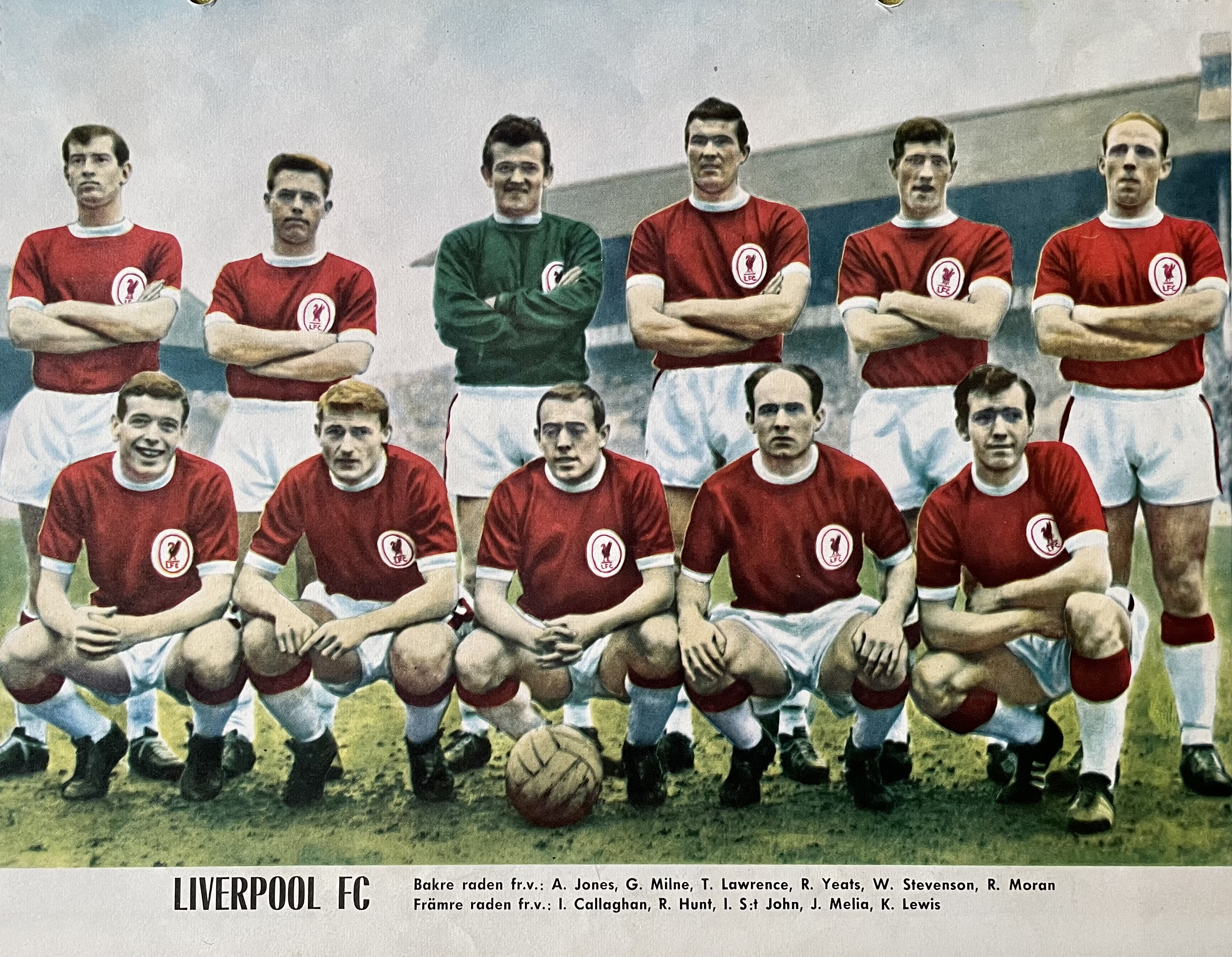
Liverpool F.C. at 1963 with following players, from left standing: Allan Jones, Gordon Milne, Tommy Lawrence, Ron Yeats (captain), Willie Stevenson, Ronnie Moran; front row: Ian Callaghan, Roger Hunt, Ian St John, Jimmy Melia and Kevin Lewis.

William Stevenson (26 October 1939 – 27 May 2025) was a Scottish professional football player and manager. He played for Rangers, Liverpool, Stoke City, Tranmere Rovers and the Vancouver Whitecaps.

== Career ==
=== Rangers ===
Stevenson was born in Leith on 26 October 1939. He played for Edina Hearts and Dalkeith Thistle before turning professional with Rangers. He immediately became a regular in the side, winning the Scottish Football League in his first season and the Scottish Cup in his second while also being involved in the semi-finals of the 1959–60 European Cup and earning selection for the Scottish Football League XI, but then lost his first team place after Jim Baxter joined Rangers in 1960.

After he was displaced by Baxter, Stevenson declined to sign a new contract with Rangers and went out to Australia in the summer of 1962, but was still registered with the Glasgow club and was not permitted to play official matches with local clubs, so he returned to Scotland and both Liverpool and Preston North End put in bids to sign him.

=== Liverpool ===
Bill Shankly paid £20,000 to bring the 22-year-old to Liverpool in October 1962. He made his debut in the 2–1 home league defeat to Burnley on 3 November 1962, he scored his first goal in a 5–0 victory over Leyton Orient at Anfield, Stevenson managed to hit the net in the 35th minute, Roger Hunt with a hat-trick and Ian St John scored the others. Stevenson helped the Reds gain the 1963–64 First Division title in only their 2nd season back in the top flight of English football, he featured in 38 of the 42 league games thus cementing a starting role on the left of the Reds midfield.

Stevenson played a major role in winning of Liverpool's first ever FA Cup in 1965, he played in all of the ties scoring the second goal from the penalty spot in the 2–0 semi-final victory over Chelsea at Villa Park. Leeds United stood in Shankly's team's way and after a 0–0 draw in 90 minutes, goals from Hunt and St John beat the Elland Road club by 2 goals to 1 to take the trophy go to Anfield after a 72-year wait. The following campaign, again, saw silverware head to Merseyside as the Reds took the league title once more. Stevenson missed just the one fixture and scored five times as Liverpool topped the table by a comfortable six points over Leeds. He also tasted disappointment, however, as Borussia Dortmund beat Liverpool 2–1 in the European Cup Winners Cup final at Hampden Park, the 1st European final the Anfield club had reached.

Shankly had bought 19-year-old Emlyn Hughes from Blackpool in February 1967 and selected him ahead of Stevenson at the beginning of the 1967–68 season – this proved to be a turning point in Stevenson's career, he got the nod just once in the league and three times in the Fairs Cup. By December 1967 he was on his way, leaving for Stoke City.

=== Stoke City ===
Stoke manager Tony Waddington paid £30,000 for Stevenson as a replacement for the departed Calvin Palmer. He played 20 games in 1967–68 and 34 times in 1968–69 as Stoke had two poor seasons, narrowly avoiding relegation. A much improved 1969–70 campaign saw Stevenson play 23 games as Stoke finished in 9th. He played six matches at the start of 1970–71 before injury ruled him out for the remainder of the season. He played 25 games in 1971–72, including an appearance in an early round during Stoke's path to victory in the Football League Cup, which was Stoke's only major trophy at the time of Stevenson's death. However, Stevenson was injured when Stoke won the Football League Cup final. He played in just three games in 1972–73. At the end of the season he left the Victoria Ground after making 112 appearances and scoring seven goals.

=== Tranmere Rovers ===
Stevenson joined Third Division Tranmere Rovers where he made 27 appearances.

=== Later career ===
In 1974, he joined the Vancouver Whitecaps in the newly formed North American Soccer League (NASL). He played in Vancouver for one season.

Stevenson then played for Limerick before returning to the UK to play for non-league Macclesfield Town. He also spent a short time in South Africa playing for Hellenic.

=== After football ===
Stevenson spent time as a publican and then ran a contract cleaning company in Macclesfield.

Stevenson died on 27 May 2025, at the age of 85.

== Career statistics ==
Appearances and goals by club, season and competition
Club	Season	League			FA Cup		League Cup		Europe		Other (Note: Anglo-Scottish Cup, Glasgow Cup, FA Charity Shield and Texaco Cup.)		Total	
Club	Season	Division	Apps	Goals	Apps	Goals	Apps	Goals	Apps	Goals	Apps	Goals	Apps	Goals
Rangers	1958–59	Scottish Division One	26	0	3	0	0	0	0	0	0	0	29	0
Rangers	1959–60	Scottish Division One	33	1	7	0	5	0	9	0	3	0	57	1
Rangers	1960–61	Scottish Division One	8	0	1	0	2	0	0	0	1	0	12	0
Rangers	1961–62	Scottish Division One	5	0	1	0	2	0	0	0	0	0	8	0
Rangers	Total		72	1	12	0	9	0	9	0	4	0	106	1
Liverpool	1962–63	First Division	28	2	6	0	0	0	0	0	0	0	34	2
Liverpool	1963–64	First Division	38	1	5	0	0	0	0	0	0	0	43	1
Liverpool	1964–65	First Division	39	3	8	1	0	0	9	1	1	0	57	5
Liverpool	1965–66	First Division	41	5	1	0	0	0	9	1	1	0	52	5
Liverpool	1966–67	First Division	41	3	4	0	0	0	5	0	1	0	51	3
Liverpool	1967–68	First Division	1	1	0	0	0	0	3	0	0	0	4	1
Liverpool	Total		188	15	24	1	0	0	26	2	3	0	241	18
Stoke City	1967–68	First Division	18	0	2	1	0	0	0	0	0	0	20	1
Stoke City	1968–69	First Division	32	3	0	0	2	0	0	0	0	0	34	3
Stoke City	1969–70	First Division	20	2	3	1	0	0	0	0	0	0	23	3
Stoke City	1970–71	First Division	5	0	0	0	1	0	0	0	0	0	6	0
Stoke City	1971–72	First Division	17	0	0	0	1	0	0	0	8	0	26	0
Stoke City	1972–73	First Division	2	0	0	0	1	0	0	0	0	0	3	0
Stoke City	Total		94	5	5	2	5	0	0	0	8	0	112	7
Tranmere Rovers	1973–74	Third Division	20	0	2	0	5	0	0	0	0	0	27	0
Vancouver Whitecaps	1974	North American Soccer League	19	0	—		—		—		—		19	0
Macclesfield Town	1974–75	Northern Premier League	32	0	2	0	—		—		8	0	42	0
Career total			425	21	45	3	19	0	35	2	23	0	547	26

== Honours ==
Rangers

- Scottish League: 1958–59
- Scottish Cup: 1959–60

Liverpool

- Football League First Division: 1963–64, 1965–66
- FA Cup: 1964–65
- FA Charity Shield: 1964, 1965, 1966
- UEFA Cup Winners' Cup runner-up: 1965–66

Stoke City

- Football League Cup: 1971–72
