= Peter Thompson (footballer, born 1942) =

English footballer

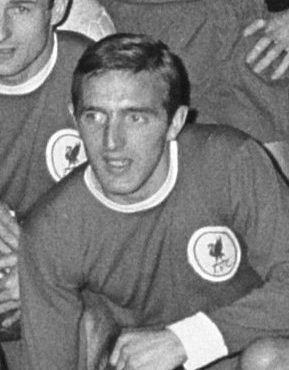
- Thompson in 1966

Personal information
- Full name: Peter Thompson
- Date of birth: 27 November 1942
- Place of birth: Carlisle, England
- Date of death: 30 December 2018 (aged 76)
- Height: 6 ft 1 in (1.85 m)
- Position: Winger

Youth career
- 1957–1960: Preston North End

Senior career*
Years	Team	Apps	(Gls)
1960–1963	Preston North End	121	(20)
1963–1973	Liverpool	323	(42)
1973–1978	Bolton Wanderers	117	(2)
Total		561	(64)

International career
1964–1970	England	16	(0)
- * Club domestic league appearances and goals

Peter Thompson (27 November 1942 – 30 December 2018) was an English professional footballer. Thompson was known for his speedy and electric style of play. Signed by Bill Shankly who placed him "up among the all-time greats", Thompson spent ten years at Liverpool where he won two league titles and the FA Cup.

Thompson made 560 appearances in the English Football League, playing for Preston North End F.C, Liverpool and Bolton Wanderers. Thompson played as an outside left for Liverpool, and was capped 16 times for England.

== Life and career ==
=== Preston North End ===
Thompson started his football career playing for the Petteril Bank Primary School before moving to Harraby Secondary school in Carlisle. He played inside forward for England. On graduation, Thompson was recruited by 17 professional football clubs. He decided to join Preston North End F.C.

At Preston, Thompson became a regular First division player at age 17, making his debut against Arsenal F.C. on 30 August 1960. In describing Thompson, Chairman Nat Buck said. "I've lost the number of clubs who want him, but how could we sell?" Preston even turned down a bid from Juventus.

Bill Shankly had been impressed by the speed and trickery of the young winger during a marathon 5th round FA cup tie between Liverpool F.C. and Preston in February 1962. It went to a second replay at Old Trafford before the deadlock was finally broken by Thompson.

In 1961, after 121 League games and 20 League goals for Preston and relegation to 2nd Division, Thompson moved to Liverpool for £37,000.

=== Liverpool ===
"I have no hesitation in placing Peter up among the all-time greats – alongside such players as Tom Finney, Stanley Matthews and George Best. They say he didn’t score enough goals, they said his final pass wasn’t telling enough. Well, if he had scored goals as well as everything else he did, he would have been in the same category as Jesus Christ!"

— Bill Shankly writing in the Liverpool F.C. programme for Thompson’s testimonial.

Arriving at Liverpool, Thompson went into the first-team. He played in all 42 League games that first season, winning a championship medal as Liverpool won the title by four points. The team won three trophies in the mid-60s, winning another championship medal in 1966. Thompson played in Liverpool's FA Cup victory against Leeds in 1965. He came to Alf Ramsey's attention and won 16 caps.

In 1966 and again in 1970 Thompson was named to the initial World Cup squad of 28 players (he had also been in the initial squad of 40 players in 1962), but did not make the final squad. As a member of the initial England squad ahead of the 1970 FIFA World Cup, Thompson was involved in the Bogotá Bracelet incident. By some accounts, he was in or near the jewellery shop when Bobby Moore allegedly stole a bracelet.

He started the 1970–71 season in the first-team and played in the opening 16 league matches. He was not a regular starter during the second half of the season although he did come off the bench to replace Alun Evans in the 1971 FA Cup final against Arsenal. He immediately helped to provide Steve Heighway with the opener before losing 2-1 after extra time.

=== Bolton Wanderers ===
Suffering from knee problems in 1973 and relegated to the Liverpool reserves, Thompson contemplated retirement. However, Jimmy Armfield, manager of Bolton F.C, . persuaded Thompson to go on loan to Bolton in December 1973. In January 1974, Thompson signed with Bolton for £18,000..

Thompson retired in April 1978 after having played 132 matches for Bolton, who were promoted that season to the top-flight.

=== After football ===
After retiring in 1978, Thompson ran a caravan park for seven years in Knott End-on-Sea in Lancashire. He then ran a pub and inn in Bowland Bridge in the Lake District and a hotel in Harrogate. In 2006, Thompson moved to Portugal.

Thompson died on 30 December 2018, aged 76.

== Honours ==
Preston North End

- FA Youth Cup runner-up: 1959-60

Liverpool

- Football League First Division: 1963–64, 1965–66
- FA Cup: 1964–65; runner-up: 1970–71
- European Cup Winners' Cup runner-up: 1965–66
- FA Charity Shield: 1964 (shared), 1965, 1966

Bolton Wanderers

- Football League Second Division: 1977–78
