= Alf Arrowsmith =

English footballer (1942–2005)

Personal information
- Date of birth: 11 December 1942
- Place of birth: Hollingworth, England
- Date of death: 12 May 2005 (age 62)
- Position: Striker

Youth career
- Ashton United

Senior career*
Years	Team	Apps	(Gls)
1960–1968	Liverpool	47	(20)
1968–1970	Bury	48	(11)
1970–1972	Rochdale	47	(14)
1972–1973	Macclesfield Town	20	(3)
- * Club domestic league appearances and goals

Alf Arrowsmith (11 December 1942 – 12 May 2005) was an English footballer who played as a striker.

Arrowsmith began his career in non-league football with Tintwistle Villa. The talented player made his mark scoring a massive 96 goals in the 1959–60 season - a club record which remains unbeaten today. He moved to Ashton United where he played alongside future England star Alan Ball and within weeks was spotted by an Anfield scout and signed for Liverpool in 1960 for £1500. Although he made his debut for the club the following year it was during the 1963–64 season that he really came to prominence, scoring fifteen goals in 20 league games. However a bad injury suffered in the 1964 FA Charity Shield derailed Arrowsmith's career and he never recaptured the same form again, leaving to join Bury in 1968, before finishing his career at Rochdale and Macclesfield Town.

Arrowsmith was described by Liverpool manager Bill Shankly as "a born goalscorer".

After a short illness he died in May 2005.
