= Tommy Lawrence =

Scottish footballer (1940–2018)

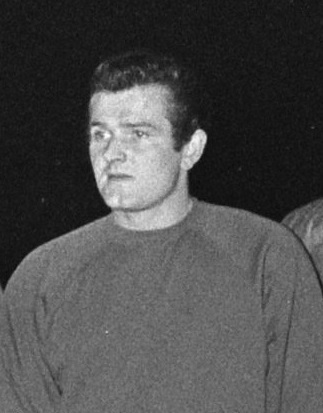
- Lawrence with Liverpool in 1966

Personal information
- Full name: Thomas Johnstone Lawrence
- Date of birth: 14 May 1940
- Place of birth: Dailly, Ayrshire, Scotland
- Date of death: 10 January 2018 (aged 77)
- Place of death: Warrington, Cheshire, England
- Position: Goalkeeper

Youth career
- Warrington Town

Senior career*
Years	Team	Apps	(Gls)
1957–1971	Liverpool	306	(0)
1971–1974	Tranmere Rovers	80	(0)
1974–1975	Chorley		
Total		386	(0)

International career
1962	Scotland U23	1	(0)
1963–1969	Scotland	3	(0)
- * Club domestic league appearances and goals

Thomas Johnstone Lawrence (14 May 1940 – 10 January 2018) was a Scottish professional footballer who played as a goalkeeper for Liverpool and Tranmere Rovers from the 1950s to the 1970s.

Lawrence spent 14 years at Liverpool, making his debut in 1962. Affectionately nicknamed "The Flying Pig" by Liverpool supporters, he made more than 300 league appearances for the club and under manager Bill Shankly he won two league titles and an FA Cup. He played in three full internationals for Scotland during the 1960s.

== Early years ==
Lawrence was born Thomas Johnstone in Dailly, Ayrshire, one of three children of Frank and Ruby Lawrence. The Lawrence family moved to North West England when Tommy was a child, along with elder brother William (Billy) and younger sister Mary. On leaving school, he worked at Rylands wire factory and played for Croft Village Football Team, and then Stockton Heath as an amateur.

== Club career ==
=== Liverpool, 1957–1971 ===
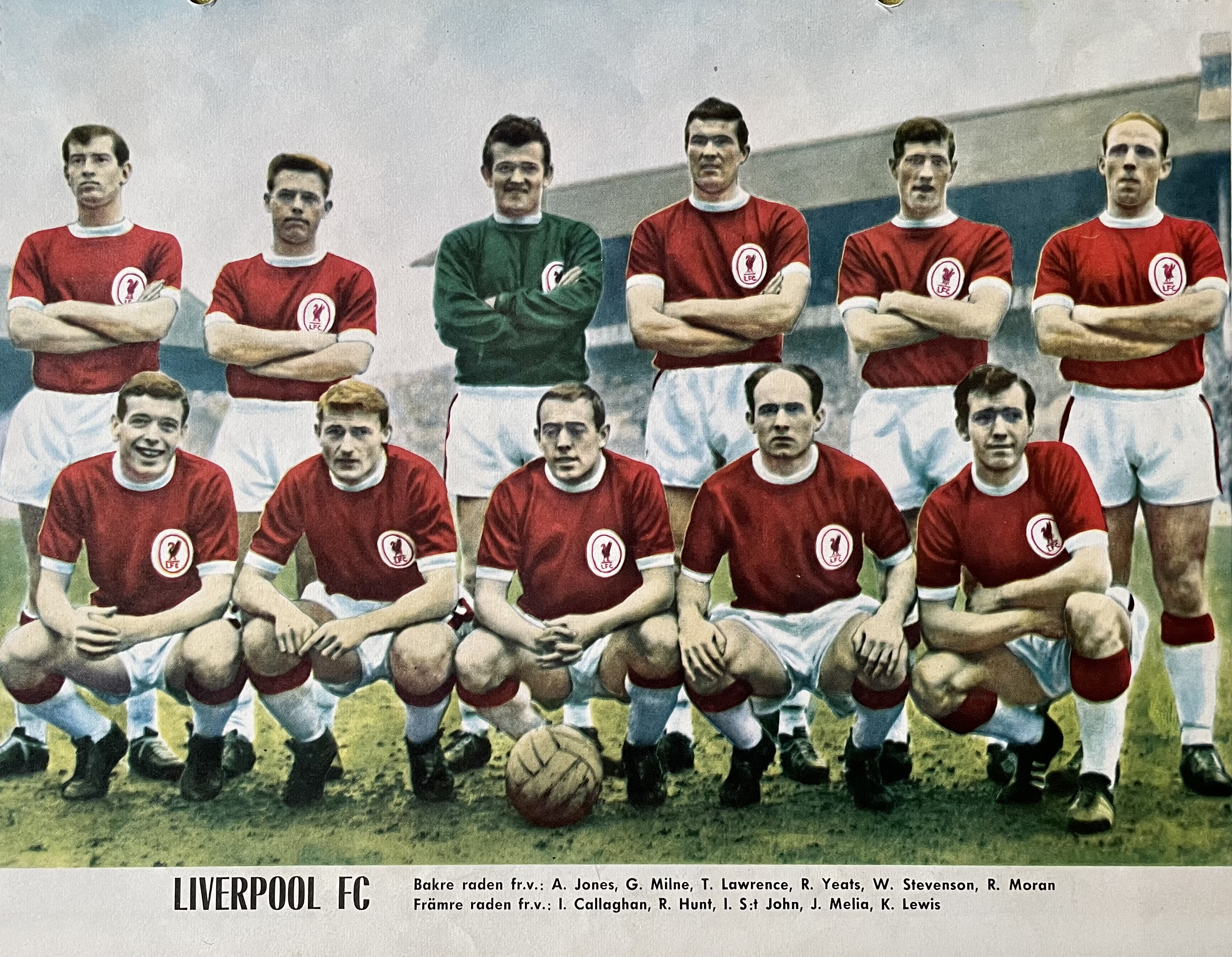
Portrait of Liverpool F.C. in 1963 with Lawrence in green

Aged 17, Lawrence was signed by Liverpool under the management of Phil Taylor in 1957. He made his first team debut under manager Bill Shankly, playing in a 1–0 defeat against West Bromwich Albion at the Hawthorns on 27 October 1962. His first clean sheet came on 17 November, when Liverpool beat fellow promotion hopefuls Leyton Orient at Anfield 5–0, with Roger Hunt scoring a hat-trick.

Lawrence went on to retain the No.1 jersey that season making 35 appearances, including 6 ties in Liverpool's run to the FA Cup semi-final at Hillsborough. Leicester City were their opponents and prevented the Reds from reaching the 1963 FA Cup final by winning the game 1–0. Liverpool had finished in 8th place in their first season back in the First Division, as their Merseyside rivals Everton won the 1962–63 league championship. The following season Lawrence played in 40 league games out of a possible 42, and he also played in 5 cup ties. Liverpool won the 1963–64 league championship, four points clear of Manchester United.

In the 1964–65 season Lawrence and Liverpool were unable to repeat the previous season's achievements, finishing in 7th place and a full 17 points behind winners Manchester United. However, a cup run took Liverpool to the 1965 FA Cup final, where they faced Leeds United at Wembley. It was Liverpool's first cup final appearance since 1950, and they had never won the trophy before. Both sides had only conceded two goals during their runs to the final. Lawrence kept a clean sheet during the 90 minutes of normal time, but Liverpool also could not score so the game went into extra-time. After 3 minutes of the extra period Roger Hunt opened the scoring for Liverpool, but the lead lasted just 2 minutes as Billy Bremner scored the equaliser. In the 113th minute Ian St John headed the ball home for the winner to seal Liverpool's first F.A. Cup victory.

Lawrence enjoyed more success the following season as the Reds found their league form once more, winning the 1965–66 title by 6 clear points over Leeds. Such was Lawrence's form, consistency and durability he missed only a handful of games during eight years as the regular Liverpool goalkeeper. He earned the affectionate nickname The Flying Pig because of his ability to dive around the penalty area despite weighing more than 14 stone (89 kg). He is credited with being one of the first sweeper-keepers.

Lawrence held off the challenge of teenage keeper Ray Clemence when the youngster arrived from Scunthorpe United in 1967, but Liverpool had begun to decline as the team aged. Though Lawrence was not the eldest, he was suddenly removed from the team in favour of Clemence after a 1–0 6th round FA Cup defeat at Watford in 1970; along with outfield players Ron Yeats and Ian St John. Lawrence played for Liverpool only once more, against Manchester City in a 2–2 draw at Maine Road on 26 April 1971.

=== Tranmere Rovers, 1971–1974 ===
After 390 appearances in the Liverpool goal, Lawrence joined Tranmere Rovers on 10 November 1971. He spent three years and made 80 league appearances for Tranmere under player/manager and ex-Liverpool teammate, Ron Yeats. Lawrence then drifted back into the non-league game with Chorley, before retiring.

== International career ==
During his time at Liverpool, Lawrence won three caps for Scotland. His international debut came on 3 June 1963 in a friendly international at Dalymount Park, Dublin, which the Republic of Ireland won 1–0. Lawrence had to wait six years for his second and third caps, a 1–1 draw with West Germany in a 1970 World Cup qualifier and a 5–3 victory over Wales in a British Home Championship match. During the latter appearance, his last international, Lawrence collided with the crossbar and had to be carried off.

== Later years and death ==
After Lawrence retired from professional football he returned to work at Rylands, the wire manufacturer.

In February 2015, Lawrence was inadvertently interviewed in the street by BBC journalist Stuart Flinders, who was asking elderly people if they remembered the 1966–67 FA Cup fifth-round game between Liverpool and Everton. Lawrence, smiling, replied, "Yeah, I do. I played in it. I was goalkeeper for Liverpool."

Lawrence died on 10 January 2018 in Warrington, at the age of 77.

== Honours ==
Liverpool

- Football League First Division: 1963–64, 1965–66
- FA Cup: 1964–65
- FA Charity Shield: 1964 (shared), 1965 (shared), 1966
