= Gerry Byrne (footballer, born 1938) =

English footballer (1938–2015)

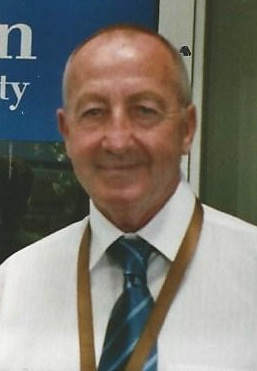
- Byrne in 2006

Personal information
- Full name: Gerald Byrne
- Date of birth: 29 August 1938
- Place of birth: Liverpool, Lancashire, England
- Date of death: 28 November 2015 (aged 77)
- Place of death: Wrexham, Wales
- Height: 1.78 m (5 ft 10 in)
- Position: Left-back

Youth career
- 1953–1957: Liverpool

Senior career*
Years	Team	Apps	(Gls)
1957–1969	Liverpool	274	(2)

International career
1963–1966	England	2	(0)
- * Club domestic league appearances and goals

Gerald Byrne (29 August 1938 – 28 November 2015) was an English footballer who played as a left-back. He spent his entire playing career at Liverpool and was a member of England's 1966 World Cup winning squad though only received a winner's medal some years later.

== Life and playing career ==
Byrne was born in Liverpool, and was of Irish descent. Byrne, like Jimmy Melia, joined Liverpool straight from school as a 15-year-old in 1953. Again like Melia, Byrne impressed manager Don Welsh who offered the full-back a professional contract the day after his 17th birthday on 30 August 1955. It was just over two years later that Byrne made his debut; Charlton Athletic thrashed the Reds 5–1 in a league match at The Valley on 28 September 1957, he had to wait a further 4 1/2 years for his first goal which came in the 52nd minute of a 3–1 2nd Division win over Brighton at Anfield on 3 February 1962.

His debut was his only appearance during season 1957–58. Bill Shankly was appointed manager in December 1959 and at the season's end had a clear out of 24 players. Notably Byrne was retained as was Roger Hunt. It was not until the arrival of Bill Shankly that he really got his chance; he featured in 38 league and cup matches as the Reds finished third for the fifth time in a row in the second division. Considering he only played seven times in the previous three seasons this was a major improvement in Gerry's career; in fact, he was on the transfer list when Shankly arrived, soon to be removed.

Byrne was ever-present as Liverpool, finally, romped to the 2nd division title, beating Leyton Orient into second spot by eight points. He played in 38 of Liverpool's 42 league games their first year back, and he also played in all seven of Liverpool's cup ties during their run to the 1965 FA Cup.

=== The 1965 FA Cup final ===
Byrne played for Liverpool in the 1965 FA Cup final, which took place on 1 May at Wembley, with a broken collarbone. He suffered the injury as early as the third minute, but played on throughout the rest of the game and the whole of extra-time as Liverpool won the Cup for the very first time. The break happened after Byrne was challenged heftily by Leeds United's captain Bobby Collins, but, with substitutes still not permitted by the authorities in 1965, he had little choice but to carry on playing. The game went to extra-time and Byrne, despite the pain, kept making his familiar marauding runs down the left flank in joining the attack. Early on into the first period of extra time, he reached the by-line with the ball and pulled back a perfect cross for Roger Hunt to open the scoring. Leeds got back into the game and equalised through Billy Bremner but Liverpool were not to be denied as Ian St John headed home the winner late on during the second period securing Liverpool's first ever FA Cup. Shankly spoke highly of Gerry in an interview after the final saying "It was a performance of raw courage from the boy".

The aftermath of another high-profile match led to calls, again, for the Football Association to allow a substitute to be selected by each team in competitive matches. In FA Cup finals over the previous decade there had been a notable number of teams reduced to ten men or hampered considerably by hard challenges from opposition players. This included goalkeepers Bert Trautmann (in 1955) and Ray Wood (in 1957) suffering a broken neck and broken cheekbone respectively; while two wingers in successive years were stretchered off with broken legs (Roy Dwight in 1959 and Dave Whelan in 1960) and a full back left hobbling for three-quarters of the game with a damaged ankle (Len Chalmers in 1961). Byrne's injury was the latest to try to force the FA's hand and, eventually, two years later the first substitutes were allowed in the FA Cup final.

=== After the final and beyond ===
The 1965–66 campaign was another triumphant one for Byrne and the Reds as he was an ever-present in Liverpool's second title win in three years. Byrne, along with winger Ian Callaghan and Hunt, were rewarded for their superb club form by being selected in Alf Ramsey's England squad for the 1966 World Cup finals to be held on home soil.

In the 1966 World Cup final only the 11 players on the pitch at the end of the 4–2 win over West Germany received medals. Following a Football Association led campaign to persuade FIFA to award medals to all the winners' squad members, Byrne was presented with his medal by Gordon Brown at a ceremony at 10 Downing Street on 10 June 2009.

Byrne won two international caps for England. He made his international debut on 6 April 1963, in a British Home Championship match against Scotland at Wembley. The Scots won 2–1 in a game which saw fellow Liverpool teammate Jimmy Melia make his England debut. His second (and last) cap came in a friendly match preceding the 1966 World Cup. Jimmy Greaves scored four goals as England won 6–1 against Norway. Byrne stayed on at Anfield until 1969 when injury ended his career. He was replaced by Alec Lindsay.

== Later years ==
He suffered from Alzheimer's disease in later life and died in a nursing home in Wrexham on 28 November 2015 at the age of 77.

== Honours ==
Liverpool

- Football League First Division: 1963–64, 1965–66
- FA Cup: 1964–65
- FA Charity Shield: 1964, 1965, 1966
- Football League Second Division: 1961–62

England

- FIFA World Cup: 1966
