= 1955–56 Liverpool F.C. season =

English football club season

Liverpool
1955–56 season
- Manager: Don Welsh
- Second Division: 3rd
- FA Cup: Fifth round
- Top goalscorer: League: Billy Liddell (27); All: Billy Liddell (32)
- Highest home attendance: 57,528 (v Manchester City, FA Cup, 18 February)
- Lowest home attendance: 21,068 (v Leeds United, League, 29 February)
- Average home league attendance: 37,324
Home colours	Away colours

The 1955–1956 season was the 64th season in Liverpool F.C.'s existence, and was their second consecutive season in the Second Division. The club finished just outside the top two at 3rd place, four points outside the automatic promotion places. They were also knocked out of the FA Cup by the eventual holders Manchester City in the 5th Round.

== Squad ==
=== Goalkeepers ===
- (South Africa) Doug Rudham
- (England) Dave Underwood

=== Defenders ===
- (England) Don Campbell
- (England) Laurie Hughes
- (Wales) Ray Lambert
- (England) John Molyneux
- (England) Ronnie Moran
- (England) Tom McNulty
- (England) Fred Perry
- (Wales) John Price
- (England) Alex South
- (England) Geoff Twentyman
- (England) Dick White

=== Midfielders ===
- (England) Alan A'Court
- (England) Brian Jackson
- (England) Jimmy Payne
- (England) Roy Saunders
- (England) Barry Wilkinson

=== Forwards ===
- (England) Eric Anderson
- (England) Alan Arnell
- (England) Louis Bimpson
- (England) Joe Dickson
- (England) John Evans
- (Scotland) Billy Liddell
- (England) Jimmy Melia
- (Wales) Tony Rowley

== Squad statistics ==
=== Appearances and goals ===
No.	Pos	Nat	Player	Total		Division 2		FA Cup	
No.	Pos	Nat	Player	Apps	Goals	Apps	Goals	Apps	Goals
	MF	(England) ENG	Alan A'Court	45	6	40	6	5	0
	FW	(England) ENG	Eric Anderson	20	6	20	6	0	0
	FW	(England) ENG	Alan Arnell	27	15	23	13	4	2
	FW	(England) ENG	Louis Bimpson	9	0	8	0	1	0
	FW	(England) ENG	Joe Dickson	6	4	6	4	0	0
	FW	(England) ENG	John Evans	36	13	31	13	5	0
	DF	(England) ENG	Laurie Hughes	44	0	39	0	5	0
	MF	(England) ENG	Brian Jackson	15	0	15	0	0	0
	DF	(Wales) WAL	Ray Lambert	10	0	10	0	0	0
	MF	(Scotland) SCO	Billy Liddell	44	32	39	27	5	5
	DF	(England) ENG	Tom McNulty	1	0	1	0	0	0
	FW	(England) ENG	Jimmy Melia	4	1	4	1	0	0
	DF	(England) ENG	John Molyneux	37	0	32	0	5	0
	DF	(England) ENG	Ronnie Moran	44	0	39	0	5	0
	MF	(England) ENG	Jimmy Payne	21	3	16	2	5	1
	DF	(England) ENG	Fred Perry	1	0	1	0	0	0
	DF	(Wales) WAL	John Price	1	0	1	0	0	0
	FW	(Wales) WAL	Tony Rowley	7	6	7	6	0	0
	GK	(South Africa) RSA	Doug Rudham	21	0	21	0	0	0
	MF	(England) ENG	Roy Saunders	37	0	37	0	0	0
	DF	(England) ENG	Geoff Twentyman	47	7	42	7	5	0
	GK	(England) ENG	Dave Underwood	26	0	21	0	5	0
	DF	(England) ENG	Dick White	8	0	8	0	0	0
	MF	(England) ENG	Barry Wilkinson	1	0	1	0	0	0

== Table ==
Pos	Team	Pld	W	D	L	GF	GA	GAv	Pts	Qualification or relegation
1	Sheffield Wednesday (C, P)	42	21	13	8	101	62	1.629	55	Promotion to the First Division
2	Leeds United (P)	42	23	6	13	80	60	1.333	52	Promotion to the First Division
3	Liverpool	42	21	6	15	85	63	1.349	48	
4	Blackburn Rovers	42	21	6	15	84	65	1.292	48	
5	Leicester City	42	21	6	15	94	78	1.205	48	

Rules for classification: 1) Points; 2) Goal average; 3) Goals scored
(C) Champions; (P) Promoted

== Results ==
=== Second Division ===
Date	Opponents	Venue	Result	Scorers	Attendance	Report 1	Report 2
20-Aug-55	Nottingham Forest	A	3–1	A'Court 32', 67' Evans 85'	21,389	Report	Report
24-Aug-55	Sheffield Wednesday	H	0–3		41,791	Report	Report
27-Aug-55	Hull City	H	3–0	Liddell 34', 36' Arnell 89'	38,928	Report	Report
31-Aug-55	Sheffield Wednesday	A	1–1	Liddell 60'	30,853	Report	Report
03-Sep-55	Blackburn Rovers	A	3–3	Arnell 1', 5' Liddell 38'	30,000	Report	Report
07-Sep-55	Bristol Rovers	H	0–2		38,221	Report	Report
10-Sep-55	Lincoln City	H	2–1	Arnell 15', 68'	39,816	Report	Report
17-Sep-55	Leicester City	A	1–7	Liddell 21'	21,356	Report	Report
24-Sep-55	Middlesbrough	H	1–1	Liddell 2'	35,312	Report	Report
01-Oct-55	Plymouth Argyle	H	6–1	Twentyman 9', 40' A'Court	34,397	Report	Report
08-Oct-55	Bristol City	A	1–2	Rowley 38'	25,279	Report	Report
15-Oct-55	West Ham United	H	5–1	A'Court 13' Payne 36' Liddell 82'	32,187	Report	Report
22-Oct-55	Bury	A	4–1	Arnell 3', 85' Liddell 22', 82'	12,296	Report	Report
29-Oct-55	Rotherham United	H	2–0	Arnell 61' Liddell	31,810	Report	Report
05-Nov-55	Swansea Town	A	1–6	Arnell 28'	25,000	Report	Report
12-Nov-55	Notts County	H	2–1	Liddell 36' Twentyman 81'	32,654	Report	Report
19-Nov-55	Leeds United	A	2–4	Liddell (pen 10) Arnell 17'	22,500	Report	Report
26-Nov-55	Fulham	H	7–0	Evans 1' Arnell 35' Liddell 36', 51' Twentyman 55' A'Court 61' Payne 82'	34,995	Report	Report
03-Dec-55	Port Vale	A	1–1	Liddell 40'	16,191	Report	Report
10-Dec-55	Barnsley	H	1–1	Evans 17'	26,241	Report	Report
17-Dec-55	Nottingham Forest	H	5–2	Evans 6' Melia 48' Liddell 51', 80', 89'	29,248	Report	Report
24-Dec-55	Hull City	A	2–1	Anderson 80' Evans 86'	19,537	Report	Report
26-Dec-55	Stoke City	H	2–2	Liddell (pen 55) Evans 77'	49,604	Report	Report
27-Dec-55	Stoke City	A	2–7	Twentyman 47' Rowley 50'	29,133	Report	Report
31-Dec-55	Blackburn Rovers	H	1–5	Anderson 19'	48,071	Report	Report
21-Jan-56	Leicester City	H	5–1	Liddell 20' (pen 60) Arnell 39'	39,917	Report	Report
04-Feb-56	Middlesbrough	A	2–1	Evans 67' Liddell 82'	11,000	Report	Report
11-Feb-56	Plymouth Argyle	A	0–4		10,250	Report	Report
25-Feb-56	West Ham United	A	0–2		18,800	Report	Report
29-Feb-56	Leeds United	H	1–0	Evans 80'	21,068	Report	Report
03-Mar-56	Bury	H	4–2	Evans (pen 5), 74' Liddell 25' Dickson 89'	35,535	Report	Report
10-Mar-56	Barnsley	A	5–0	Anderson 4', 84' Liddell 11', 75' Dickson 25'	13,678	Report	Report
17-Mar-56	Swansea Town	H	4–1	Liddell 2' Dickson 59', 83' Anderson 88'	48,217	Report	Report
24-Mar-56	Notts County	A	1–5	Anderson 84'	14,000	Report	Report
30-Mar-56	Doncaster Rovers	A	0–7		15,000	Report	Report
31-Mar-56	Bristol City	H	2–1	Arnell 74' Evans (pen 88)	46,713	Report	Report
02-Apr-56	Doncaster Rovers	H	1–5	Evans 22'	49,659	Report	Report
07-Apr-56	Fulham	A	1–5	Liddell 72'	15,750	Report	Report
14-Apr-56	Port Vale	H	4–1	Rowley 29', 76', 89' Twentyman 82'	29,413	Report	Report
21-Apr-56	Rotherham United	A	4–0	Rowley 8'	9,031	Report	Report
28-Apr-56	Bristol Rovers	A	5–1	Evans 7' Twentyman 80'	24,106	Report	Report
02-May-56	Lincoln City	A	0–5		11,069	Report	Report

=== FA Cup ===
Date	Opponents	Venue	Result	Scorers	Attendance	Report 1	Report 2
07-Jan-56	Accrington Stanley	H	2–0	Liddell 31', 32'	48,385	Report	Report
28-Jan-56	Scunthorpe & Lindsey United	H	3–3	Liddell 32', 90' Payne 54'	53,393	Report	Report
06-Feb-56	Scunthorpe & Lindsey United	A	2–1	Liddell 19' Arnell 109'	19,500	Report	Report
18-Feb-56	Manchester City	A	0–0		70,640	Report	Report
22-Feb-56	Manchester City	H	1–2	Arnell 52'	57,528	Report	Report
