= 1956–57 Liverpool F.C. season =

English football club season

Liverpool
1956–57 season
- Manager: Phil Taylor
- Second Division: 3rd
- FA Cup: Third round
- Top goalscorer: League: Billy Liddell (21); All: Billy Liddell (21)
- Highest home attendance: 49,344 (v Huddersfield Town, League, 18 August)
- Lowest home attendance: 15,108 (v Bristol City, League, 1 May)
- Average home league attendance: 35,735
Home colours	Away colours

The 1956–57 season was the 65th season in Liverpool F.C.'s existence, and was their third consecutive year in the Second Division. For the second consecutive year, the club finished third in the table, just one point outside the automatic promotion places.

== Squad ==
=== Goalkeepers ===
- (South Africa) Doug Rudham
- (Scotland) Tommy Younger

=== Defenders ===
- (England) Don Campbell
- (England) Laurie Hughes
- (England) John Molyneux
- (England) Ronnie Moran
- (England) Tom McNulty
- (England) Fred Perry
- (Wales) John Price
- (England) Geoff Twentyman
- (England) Dick White

=== Midfielders ===
- (England) Alan A'Court
- (England) Brian Jackson
- (England) Roy Saunders
- (England) Barry Wilkinson

=== Forwards ===
- (England) Alan Arnell
- (England) Louis Bimpson
- (England) Joe Dickson
- (England) John Evans
- (Scotland) Billy Liddell
- (England) Jimmy Melia
- (Wales) Tony Rowley
- (England) Johnny Wheeler

== Squad statistics ==
=== Appearances and goals ===
No.	Pos	Nat	Player	Total		Division 2		FA Cup	
No.	Pos	Nat	Player	Apps	Goals	Apps	Goals	Apps	Goals
	MF	(England) ENG	Alan A'Court	39	10	38	10	1	0
	FW	(England) ENG	Eric Anderson	7	1	7	1	0	0
	FW	(England) ENG	Alan Arnell	15	10	14	10	1	0
	FW	(England) ENG	Louis Bimpson	21	6	21	6	0	0
	DF	(England) ENG	Don Campbell	6	1	6	1	0	0
	FW	(England) ENG	John Evans	11	2	11	2	0	0
	DF	(England) ENG	Laurie Hughes	42	0	41	0	1	0
	MF	(England) ENG	Brian Jackson	19	2	19	2	0	0
	MF	(Scotland) SCO	Billy Liddell	42	21	41	21	1	0
	DF	(England) ENG	Tom McNulty	2	0	2	0	0	0
	FW	(England) ENG	Jimmy Melia	27	6	26	6	1	0
	DF	(England) ENG	John Molyneux	41	0	40	0	1	0
	DF	(England) ENG	Ronnie Moran	43	0	42	0	1	0
	FW	(Wales) WAL	Tony Rowley	14	7	14	7	0	0
	GK	(South Africa) RSA	Doug Rudham	2	0	2	0	0	0
	MF	(England) ENG	Roy Saunders	28	1	27	1	1	0
	DF	(England) ENG	Geoff Twentyman	31	3	30	3	1	0
	FW	(England) ENG	Johnny Wheeler	29	11	28	10	1	1
	DF	(England) ENG	Dick White	5	0	5	0	0	0
	MF	(England) ENG	Barry Wilkinson	8	0	8	0	0	0
	GK	(Scotland) SCO	Tommy Younger	41	0	40	0	1	0

== Table ==
Pos	Team	Pld	W	D	L	GF	GA	GAv	Pts	Qualification or relegation
1	Leicester City (C, P)	42	25	11	6	109	67	1.627	61	Promotion to the First Division
2	Nottingham Forest (P)	42	22	10	10	94	55	1.709	54	Promotion to the First Division
3	Liverpool	42	21	11	10	82	54	1.519	53	
4	Blackburn Rovers	42	21	10	11	83	75	1.107	52	
5	Stoke City	42	20	8	14	83	58	1.431	48	

Rules for classification: 1) Points; 2) Goal average; 3) Goals scored
(C) Champions; (P) Promoted

== Results ==
=== Second Division ===
Date	Opponents	Venue	Result	Scorers	Attendance	Report 1	Report 2
18-Aug-56	Huddersfield Town	H	2–3	Liddell 62', pen 73'	49,344	Report	Report
23-Aug-56	Notts County	A	1–1	Liddell 9'	14,671	Report	Report
25-Aug-56	Bury	A	2–0	Bimpson 10' Saunders 17'	17,000	Report	Report
29-Aug-56	Notts County	H	3–3	Twentyman Bimpson 79'	41,095	Report	Report
01-Sep-56	Grimsby Town	H	3–2	Bimpson 4', 73' Arnell 68'	43,222	Report	Report
03-Sep-56	West Ham United	A	1–1	Liddell 18'	25,000	Report	Report
08-Sep-56	Doncaster Rovers	A	1–1	Liddell 87'	13,580	Report	Report
15-Sep-56	Stoke City	H	0–2		47,119	Report	Report
22-Sep-56	Middlesbrough	A	1–1	Own goal 15'	23,000	Report	Report
29-Sep-56	Leicester City	H	2–0	Melia 68' Liddell 71'	41,126	Report	Report
06-Oct-56	Blackburn Rovers	H	2–3	Anderson 49' Liddell 64'	41,538	Report	Report
13-Oct-56	Bristol City	A	1–2	Wheeler 7'	26,042	Report	Report
20-Oct-56	Fulham	H	4–3	A'Court 26' Wheeler 42' Liddell 52' Melia 79'	36,735	Report	Report
27-Oct-56	Barnsley	A	1–4	Melia 67'	13,941	Report	Report
03-Nov-56	Port Vale	H	4–1	Liddell 53' Wheeler 81', 82', 85'	32,334	Report	Report
10-Nov-56	Rotherham United	A	2–2	Bimpson 39' A'Court 90'	11,524	Report	Report
17-Nov-56	Lincoln City F.C.	H	4–0	Arnell 18', 86' Wheeler 31', 71'	29,672	Report	Report
24-Nov-56	Swansea Town	A	1–1	Arnell 27'	18,000	Report	Report
01-Dec-56	Sheffield United	H	5–1	Wheeler 24' Liddell 44' Melia 55' A'Court 72' Arnell 80'	34,159	Report	Report
08-Dec-56	Nottingham Forest	A	0–1		17,624	Report	Report
15-Dec-56	Huddersfield Town	A	3–0	Arnell	11,577	Report	Report
22-Dec-56	Bury	H	2–0	Liddell pen 15' Melia 71'	18,754	Report	Report
25-Dec-56	Leyton Orient	H	1–0	A'Court 45'	22,001	Report	Report
26-Dec-56	Leyton Orient	A	4–0	A'Court Arnell Bimpson Liddell	10,332	Report	Report
29-Dec-56	Grimsby Town	A	0–0		15,001	Report	Report
12-Jan-57	Doncaster Rovers	H	2–1	Arnell 70' Twentyman 78'	35,954	Report	Report
19-Jan-57	Stoke City	A	0–1		31,144	Report	Report
02-Feb-57	Middlesbrough	H	1–2	A'Court 75'	38,890	Report	Report
09-Feb-57	Leicester City	A	2–3	Liddell 21' Evans 34'	39,622	Report	Report
16-Feb-57	Blackburn Rovers	A	2–2	Wheeler 52' Liddell 60'	27,100	Report	Report
02-Mar-57	Fulham	A	2–1	Evans 13' Liddell 54'	26,500	Report	Report
09-Mar-57	Barnsley	H	2–1	Wheeler 5' Liddell 47'	30,672	Report	Report
16-Mar-57	Port Vale	A	2–1	Rowley 48', 73'	14,241	Report	Report
23-Mar-57	Rotherham United	H	4–1	Liddell 42' Own goal 47' Rowley 56' A'Court 72'	33,307	Report	Report
30-Mar-57	Lincoln City F.C.	A	3–3	Jackson 32', 72' Rowley 44'	8,449	Report	Report
06-Apr-57	Swansea Town	H	2–0	A'Court 30', 60'	34,773	Report	Report
13-Apr-57	Sheffield United	A	0–3		24,000	Report	Report
19-Apr-57	Bristol Rovers	H	4–1	Melia 74' Campbell 75' Liddell pen' Rowley	40,776	Report	Report
20-Apr-57	Nottingham Forest	H	3–1	Liddell A'Court Rowley 54'	47,621	Report	Report
22-Apr-57	Bristol Rovers	A	0–0		14,794	Report	Report
27-Apr-57	West Ham United	H	1–0	Liddell pen 89'	36,236	Report	Report
01-May-57	Bristol City	H	2–1	Rowley 33' Liddell 54'	15,108	Report	Report

=== FA Cup ===
Date	Opponents	Venue	Result	Scorers	Attendance	Report 1	Report 2
05-Jan-57	Southend United	A	1–2	Wheeler 48'	18,253	Report	Report
