= 1957–58 Liverpool F.C. season =

English football club season

Liverpool
1957–58 season
- Manager: Phil Taylor
- Second Division: 4th
- FA Cup: Sixth round
- Top goalscorer: League: Billy Liddell (22); All: Billy Liddell (23)
- Highest home attendance: 56,939 (v Northampton Town, FA Cup, 25 January)
- Lowest home attendance: 24,026 (v Ipswich Town, League, 29 March)
- Average home league attendance: 38,476
Home colours	Away colours

The 1957–58 season was the 66th season in Liverpool F.C.'s existence and their fourth consecutive year in the Second Division. The club finished in fourth place, just two points outside the automatic promotion places. They also reached the Sixth Round of the FA Cup where they lost two-one by Blackburn Rovers.

== Squad ==
=== Goalkeepers ===
- (South Africa) Doug Rudham
- (Scotland) Tommy Younger

=== Defenders ===
- (England) Gerry Byrne
- (England) Don Campbell
- (England) Laurie Hughes
- (England) John Molyneux
- (England) Ronnie Moran
- (England) Tom McNulty
- (England) Geoff Twentyman
- (England) Dick White

=== Midfielders ===
- (England) Alan A'Court
- (Scotland) James Harrower
- (England) Brian Jackson
- (England) Tony McNamara
- (England) Johnny Morrissey
- (England) Roy Saunders
- (England) Johnny Wheeler
- (England) Barry Wilkinson

=== Forwards ===
- (England) Alan Arnell
- (England) Louis Bimpson
- (England) Joe Dickson
- (England) John Evans
- (Scotland) Billy Liddell
- (England) Jimmy Melia
- (England) Bobby Murdoch
- (Wales) Tony Rowley

== Squad statistics ==
=== Appearances and goals ===
No.	Pos	Nat	Player	Total		Division 2		FA Cup	
No.	Pos	Nat	Player	Apps	Goals	Apps	Goals	Apps	Goals
	MF	(England) ENG	Alan A'Court	44	6	39	6	5	0
	FW	(England) ENG	Alan Arnell	8	1	8	1	0	0
	FW	(England) ENG	Louis Bimpson	10	5	7	4	3	1
	DF	(England) ENG	Gerry Byrne	1	0	1	0	0	0
	DF	(England) ENG	Don Campbell	28	1	27	1	1	0
	FW	(England) ENG	John Evans	1	0	1	0	0	0
	MF	(Scotland) SCO	Jimmy Harrower	14	2	12	2	2	0
	DF	(England) ENG	Laurie Hughes	1	0	1	0	0	0
	MF	(England) ENG	Brian Jackson	24	2	22	2	2	0
	MF	(Scotland) SCO	Billy Liddell	40	23	35	22	5	1
	MF	(England) ENG	Tony McNamara	10	3	9	3	1	0
	DF	(England) ENG	Tom McNulty	2	0	2	0	0	0
	FW	(England) ENG	Jimmy Melia	36	10	34	10	2	0
	DF	(England) ENG	John Molyneux	45	1	40	0	5	1
	DF	(England) ENG	Ronnie Moran	46	0	41	0	5	0
	MF	(England) ENG	Johnny Morrissey	2	0	2	0	0	0
	FW	(England) ENG	Bobby Murdoch	17	7	15	5	2	2
	FW	(Wales) WAL	Tony Rowley	27	17	24	16	3	1
	GK	(South Africa) RSA	Doug Rudham	3	0	3	0	0	0
	MF	(England) ENG	Roy Saunders	5	0	4	0	1	0
	DF	(England) ENG	Geoff Twentyman	10	1	7	1	3	0
	FW	(England) ENG	Johnny Wheeler	43	5	38	5	5	0
	DF	(England) ENG	Dick White	46	1	41	0	5	1
	MF	(England) ENG	Barry Wilkinson	10	0	10	0	0	0
	GK	(Scotland) SCO	Tommy Younger	44	0	39	0	5	0

== Table ==
Pos	Team	Pld	W	D	L	GF	GA	GAv	Pts	Qualification or relegation
2	Blackburn Rovers (P)	42	22	12	8	93	57	1.632	56	Promotion to the First Division
3	Charlton Athletic	42	24	7	11	107	69	1.551	55	
4	Liverpool	42	22	10	10	79	54	1.463	54	
5	Fulham	42	20	12	10	97	59	1.644	52	
6	Sheffield United	42	21	10	11	75	50	1.500	52	

Rules for classification: 1) Points; 2) Goal average; 3) Goals scored
(P) Promoted

== Results ==
=== Second Division ===
Date	Opponents	Venue	Result	Scorers	Attendance	Report 1	Report 2
24-Aug-57	Bristol City	A	2–1	Rowley 56', 84'	28,191	Report	Report
28-Aug-57	Huddersfield Town	H	1–1	A'Court 59'	41,447	Report	Report
31-Aug-57	Cardiff City	H	3–0	Melia 2' Liddell 4' Own goal	45,698	Report	Report
04-Sep-57	Huddersfield Town	A	1–2	Rowley	16,614	Report	Report
07-Sep-57	Fulham	A	2–2	Liddell 30' A'Court 42'	33,000	Report	Report
14-Sep-57	Middlesbrough	A	2–2	Melia 47' Rowley 70'	33,000	Report	Report
19-Sep-57	Rotherham United	A	2–2	Arnell 64' Melia 84'	10,359	Report	Report
21-Sep-57	Leyton Orient	H	3–0	Wheeler 25' Rowley 55' Jackson 84'	36,077	Report	Report
23-Sep-57	Stoke City	A	2–1	Bimpson Rowley 88'	23,231	Report	Report
28-Sep-57	Charlton Athletic	A	1–5	Rowley 65'	25,403	Report	Report
05-Oct-57	Doncaster Rovers	H	5–0	Rowley 20', 25' Melia 45', 47' Bimpson 73'	33,701	Report	Report
12-Oct-57	Swansea Town	H	4–0	Rowley 6', 72' Melia Campbell 54'	37,204	Report	Report
19-Oct-57	Derby County	A	1–2	Rowley 64'	22,631	Report	Report
26-Oct-57	Bristol Rovers	H	2–0	Liddell 46' A'Court 60'	36,686	Report	Report
02-Nov-57	Lincoln City	A	1–0	Wheeler 2'	9,983	Report	Report
09-Nov-57	Notts County	H	4–0	Melia 41' A'Court 49' Liddell 51' Rowley 83'	39,735	Report	Report
16-Nov-57	Ipswich Town	A	1–3	Wheeler 56'	20,452	Report	Report
23-Nov-57	Blackburn Rovers	H	2–0	Liddell 5', 79'	55,232	Report	Report
27-Nov-57	Rotherham United	H	2–0	Wheeler 40' Liddell 62'	37,518	Report	Report
30-Nov-57	Sheffield United	A	1–1	Liddell 13'	20,122	Report	Report
07-Dec-57	West Ham United	H	1–1	Liddell 83'	34,030	Report	Report
14-Dec-57	Barnsley	A	1–2	Jackson 21'	15,205	Report	Report
21-Dec-57	Bristol City	H	4–3	Rowley 2', 57' McNamara 9' A'Court 86'	38,051	Report	Report
25-Dec-57	Grimsby Town	A	1–3	Rowley 27'	17,705	Report	Report
26-Dec-57	Grimsby Town	H	3–2	Liddell 6' (pen.), 24' McNamara 75'	47,766	Report	Report
28-Dec-57	Cardiff City	A	1–6	Wheeler 88'	32,000	Report	Report
11-Jan-58	Fulham	H	2–1	McNamara 38' Bimpson 72'	51,701	Report	Report
18-Jan-58	Middlesbrough	H	0–2		39,246	Report	Report
01-Feb-58	Leyton Orient	A	0–1		18,568	Report	Report
08-Feb-58	Charlton Athletic	H	3–1	Twentyman 37' Liddell 59' Murdoch 72'	38,528	Report	Report
19-Feb-58	Doncaster Rovers	A	1–1	Liddell 15'	6,093	Report	Report
22-Feb-58	Blackburn Rovers	A	3–3	Liddell 46', 50', 78'	41,700	Report	Report
05-Mar-58	Derby County	H	2–0	Liddell 33' Murdoch 65'	30,832	Report	Report
08-Mar-58	Bristol Rovers	A	1–3	Murdoch 50'	19,299	Report	Report
15-Mar-58	Lincoln City	H	1–0	Liddell 13'	31,403	Report	Report
22-Mar-58	Notts County	A	2–0	Melia 4' Bimpson 44'	13,040	Report	Report
29-Mar-58	Ipswich Town	H	3–1	Melia 5' Harrower 86' A'Court 87'	24,026	Report	Report
05-Apr-58	Swansea Town	A	2–0	Melia 87' Murdoch 89'	13,500	Report	Report
07-Apr-58	Stoke City	H	3–0	Murdoch 3' Liddell (pen.)	39,446	Report	Report
12-Apr-58	Sheffield United	H	1–0	Liddell 75'	43,222	Report	Report
19-Apr-58	West Ham United	A	1–1	Liddell 21'	37,750	Report	Report
26-Apr-58	Barnsley	H	1–1	Harrower 34'	26,440	Report	Report

=== FA Cup ===
Date	Opponents	Venue	Result	Scorers	Attendance	Report 1	Report 2
04-Jan-58	Southend United	H	1–1	Own goal 33'	43,454	Report	Report
08-Jan-58	Southend United	A	3–2	Molyneux 1' White 79' Rowley 81'	20,000	Report	Report
25-Jan-58	Northampton Town	H	3–1	Liddell 28' Own goal 79' Bimpson 82'	56,939	Report	Report
15-Feb-58	Scunthorpe & Lindsey United	A	1–0	Murdoch 76'	23,000	Report	Report
01-Mar-58	Blackburn Rovers	A	1–2	Murdoch 19'	51,000	Report	Report
