= 1959–60 Liverpool F.C. season =

English football club season

Liverpool
1959–60 season
- Manager: Phil Taylor (to 17 November 1959); Bob Paisley (caretaker until 1 December 1959); Bill Shankly (from 1 December 1959)
- Second Division: 3rd
- FA Cup: Fourth round
- Top goalscorer: League: Roger Hunt (21); All: Roger Hunt (23)
- Highest home attendance: 56,736 (v Manchester United, FA Cup, 30 Jan)
- Lowest home attendance: 19,411 (v Derby County, League, 6 Apr)
- Average home league attendance: 31,859
Home colours	Away colours

The 1959–60 season was the 68th season in Liverpool F.C.'s existence, and was their sixth consecutive year in the Second Division.

== Pre-season ==
On 12 June, having spent three years at Liverpool and missing only six matches, 29-year-old goalkeeper Tommy Younger was allowed to leave to take on a player-manager role at Scottish Second Division side Falkirk. In exchange, Liverpool signed Falkirk's 23-year-old goalkeeper Bert Slater. Slater had made 134 appearances for Falkirk, winning a Scottish Cup winners medal in the process, before the club were relegated at the end of the 1958-59 season. Slater was small for a goalkeeper standing at just 5 ft 8 1/2 in (1.740 m) and was nicknamed 'Shorty' but he was immediately put into the Liverpool goal upon his arrival.

There were promotions to the first-team for local-born 22-year-old defender John Nicholson and 18-year-old inside forward Willie Carlin - the latter a promising youngster who had represented his country at schoolboy and youth levels; 19-year-old full back Alan Jones, a Welsh schoolboy international who had signed professional forms for Liverpool two years earlier; Wrexham-born forward Reginald Blore who had risen through the junior ranks at Anfield; 17-year-old midfielder Ian Callaghan from Toxteth, considered by Liverpool legend Billy Liddell to be his successor; and 20-year-old striker Roger Hunt, signed a year earlier by Phil Taylor when he was brought to his attention playing for Stockton Heath.

== Season summary ==
The early stages of the campaign saw Liverpool struggle for consistency, putting manager Phil Taylor under increasing pressure after his previous three seasons in charge had all resulted in narrow failures to achieve promotion. The situation further deteriorated when Liverpool failed to win a single match in October, and while a victory over Aston Villa at the start of November gave hope that the club might have turned the corner, it was followed by a humiliating 4-2 loss to strugglers Lincoln City. This proved the end of the road for Taylor, who resigned three days later with the team stuck in 11th place. First team trainer Bob Paisley stepped in as caretaker manager for the next two matches, which saw a 4-3 win over Leyton Orient, and then a 1-0 loss to Huddersfield Town. As it turned out, it would be the Yorkshire side who would provide Liverpool with their next manager, as Bill Shankly accepted the offer to take over at Anfield shortly after the match.

Liverpool's form picked up under Shankly, leaving a promotion challenge suddenly looking feasible after all. In the end, their mediocre early-season form and then another poor spell of form around Easter would leave promotion out of their hands, though a third-place finish still represented an improvement of one place on the previous season.

== Squad ==
=== Goalkeepers ===
- (South Africa) Doug Rudham
- (Scotland) Bert Slater

=== Defenders ===
- (England) Gerry Byrne
- (Wales) Alan Jones
- (England) John Molyneux
- (England) Ronnie Moran
- (England) John Nicholson
- (England) Geoff Twentyman
- (England) Dick White

=== Midfielders ===
- (England) Alan A'Court
- (Wales) Reginald Blore
- (England) Ian Callaghan
- (England) Bobby Campbell
- (Scotland) Jimmy Harrower
- (Scotland) Tommy Leishman
- (Scotland) Billy Liddell
- (England) Jimmy Melia
- (England) Fred Morris
- (England) Johnny Morrissey
- (England) Johnny Wheeler
- (England) Barry Wilkinson

=== Forwards ===
- (England) Alan Arnell
- (England) Alan Banks
- (England) Louis Bimpson
- (England) Willie Carlin
- (England) Dave Hickson
- (England) Roger Hunt
- (England) Bobby Murdoch

== Squad statistics ==
=== Appearances and goals ===
No.	Pos	Nat	Player	Total		Division 2		FA Cup	
No.	Pos	Nat	Player	Apps	Goals	Apps	Goals	Apps	Goals
	MF	(England) ENG	Alan A'Court	44	8	42	8	2	0
	FW	(England) ENG	Alan Arnell	1	0	1	0	0	0
	FW	(England) ENG	Louis Bimpson	5	0	5	0	0	0
	MF	(Wales) WAL	Reginald Blore	1	0	1	0	0	0
	DF	(England) ENG	Gerry Byrne	5	0	5	0	0	0
	MF	(England) ENG	Ian Callaghan	4	0	4	0	0	0
	MF	(England) ENG	Bobby Campbell	13	1	13	1	0	0
	FW	(England) ENG	Willie Carlin	1	0	1	0	0	0
	MF	(Scotland) SCO	Jimmy Harrower	28	5	26	5	2	0
	FW	(England) ENG	Dave Hickson	29	21	27	21	2	0
	FW	(England) ENG	Roger Hunt	38	23	36	21	2	2
	DF	(Wales) WAL	Allan Jones	1	0	1	0	0	0
	MF	(Scotland) SCO	Tommy Leishman	17	0	15	0	2	0
	MF	(Scotland) SCO	Billy Liddell	17	5	17	5	0	0
	FW	(England) ENG	Jimmy Melia	36	14	34	14	2	0
	DF	(England) ENG	John Molyneux	40	1	38	1	2	0
	DF	(England) ENG	Ronnie Moran	44	5	42	5	2	0
	MF	(England) ENG	Fred Morris	7	2	7	2	0	0
	MF	(England) ENG	Johnny Morrissey	9	1	9	1	0	0
	DF	(England) ENG	John Nicholson	1	0	1	0	0	0
	GK	(South Africa) RSA	Doug Rudham	14	0	14	0	0	0
	GK	(Scotland) SCO	Bert Slater	30	0	28	0	2	0
	DF	(England) ENG	Geoff Twentyman	11	0	11	0	0	0
	FW	(England) ENG	Johnny Wheeler	31	3	29	2	2	1
	DF	(England) ENG	Dick White	43	0	41	0	2	0
	MF	(England) ENG	Barry Wilkinson	14	0	14	0	0	0

== Results ==
=== Second Division ===
Pos	Team	Pld	W	D	L	GF	GA	GAv	Pts	Qualification or relegation
1	Aston Villa (C, P)	42	25	9	8	89	43	2.070	59	Promotion to the First Division
2	Cardiff City (P)	42	23	12	7	90	62	1.452	58	Promotion to the First Division
3	Liverpool	42	20	10	12	90	66	1.364	50	
4	Sheffield United	42	19	12	11	68	51	1.333	50	
5	Middlesbrough	42	19	10	13	90	64	1.406	48	

Rules for classification: 1) Points; 2) Goal average; 3) Goals scored
(C) Champions; (P) Promoted

Date	Opponents	Venue	Result	Scorers	Attendance	Report 1	Report 2
22-Aug-59	Cardiff City	A	2–3	Own goal 38', 42'	34,000	Report	Report
26-Aug-59	Bristol City	H	4–2	Liddell 4', 30' Melia 53 pen' A'Court 65'	33,071	Report	Report
29-Aug-59	Hull City	H	5–3	Harrower 52' Melia 58' Moran 65' A'Court 80' Liddell 85'	35,520	Report	Report
01-Sep-59	Bristol City	A	0–1		22,528	Report	Report
05-Sep-59	Sheffield United	A	1–2	Morrissey 62'	25,073	Report	Report
09-Sep-59	Scunthorpe United	H	2–0	Melia 25' Hunt 64'	31,713	Report	Report
12-Sep-59	Middlesbrough	H	1–2	Liddell 7'	39,000	Report	Report
17-Sep-59	Scunthorpe United	A	1–1	Melia 21'	18,851	Report	Report
19-Sep-59	Derby County	A	2–1	A'Court 30' Hunt 58'	11,822	Report	Report
26-Sep-59	Plymouth Argyle	H	4–1	Melia 12' A'Court 43' Hunt 56' Moran 78'	29,278	Report	Report
03-Oct-59	Swansea Town	A	4–5	Own goal 8' Melia pen 28' Hunt 32' Moran 70'	16,500	Report	Report
10-Oct-59	Brighton & Hove Albion	H	2–2	A'Court 20' Melia 39'	30,366	Report	Report
17-Oct-59	Stoke City	A	1–1	Harrower 53'	17,000	Report	Report
24-Oct-59	Portsmouth	H	1–1	Moran 5'	21,075	Report	Report
31-Oct-59	Sunderland	A	1–1	Hunt 80'	30,208	Report	Report
07-Nov-59	Aston Villa	H	2–1	Hickson 54', 82'	49,981	Report	Report
14-Nov-59	Lincoln City	A	2–4	Hickson 28' Hunt 84'	10,801	Report	Report
21-Nov-59	Leyton Orient	H	4–3	Morris 15', 81' Melia 32' Hickson 50'	34,321	Report	Report
28-Nov-59	Huddersfield Town	A	0–1		16,185	Report	Report
05-Dec-59	Ipswich Town	H	3–1	Hunt 33', 39' Hickson 44'	24,843	Report	Report
12-Dec-59	Bristol Rovers	A	2–0	Melia 9', 85'	15,615	Report	Report
19-Dec-59	Cardiff City	H	0–4		27,291	Report	Report
26-Dec-59	Charlton Athletic	A	0–3		15,491	Report	Report
28-Dec-59	Charlton Athletic	H	2–0	A'Court 58' Hunt 63'	25,658	Report	Report
02-Jan-60	Hull City	A	1–0	Melia 31'	18,681	Report	Report
16-Jan-60	Sheffield United	H	3–0	Melia 9' Hunt 15', 68'	33,297	Report	Report
23-Jan-60	Middlesbrough	A	3–3	Own goal 10' Hickson 35' Hunt 40'	28,550	Report	Report
13-Feb-60	Plymouth Argyle	A	1–1	Hickson 32'	16,996	Report	Report
20-Feb-60	Swansea Town	H	4–1	Hickson 11', 44' Hunt 58', 89'	31,663	Report	Report
27-Feb-60	Brighton & Hove Albion	A	2–1	Hickson 40', 60'	21,118	Report	Report
05-Mar-60	Stoke City	H	5–1	Hunt 14' Harrower 19', 58' Liddell 39' Hickson 51'	35,101	Report	Report
12-Mar-60	Portsmouth	A	1–2	Harrower 13'	14,622	Report	Report
19-Mar-60	Huddersfield Town	H	2–2	Hickson 13' Wheeler 16'	30,009	Report	Report
30-Mar-60	Aston Villa	A	4–4	Hunt 20' Hickson 25', 60' Molyneux 44'	27,000	Report	Report
02-Apr-60	Lincoln City	H	1–3	Moran pen 30'	24,081	Report	Report
06-Apr-60	Derby County	H	4–1	Hunt 59' A'Court 63' Wheeler 68' Hickson 75'	19,411	Report	Report
09-Apr-60	Leyton Orient	A	0–2		13,007	Report	Report
16-Apr-60	Bristol Rovers	H	4–0	Melia 21' A'Court 56' Campbell 59' Hunt 67'	27,317	Report	Report
18-Apr-60	Rotherham United	H	3–0	Hunt 35' Hickson 65', 82'	26,776	Report	Report
19-Apr-60	Rotherham United	A	2–2	Hickson 51' Hunt 73'	10,123	Report	Report
23-Apr-60	Ipswich Town	A	1–0	Hickson 5'	12,048	Report	Report
30-Apr-60	Sunderland	H	3–0	Hickson 8' Hunt 47' Melia 85'	25,916	Report	Report

=== FA Cup ===
Date	Opponents	Venue	Result	Scorers	Attendance	Report 1	Report 2
09-Jan-60	Leyton Orient	H	2–1	Hunt 1', 90'	40,343	Report	Report
30-Jan-60	Manchester United	H	1–3	Wheeler 36'	56,736	Report	Report
