= 1958–59 Liverpool F.C. season =

English football club season

Liverpool
1958–59 season
- Manager: Phil Taylor
- Second Division: 4th
- FA Cup: Third round
- Top goalscorer: League: Jimmy Melia (21); All: Jimmy Melia (21)
- Highest home attendance: 52,546 (v Barnsley, League, 27 March)
- Lowest home attendance: 11,976 (v Scunthorpe UnitedLeague, 22 April)
- Average home league attendance: 36,653
Home colours	Away colours

The 1958–59 season was the 67th season in Liverpool F.C.'s existence, and was their fifth consecutive year in the Second Division. The club finished fourth for the second consecutive season, seven points outside the automatic promotion places.

Liverpool lost their first match in the FA Cup to Worcester City, then in the Southern League, and one league below the Football League at that time. The Third Round match finished 2–1 to Worcester City.

== Squad ==
=== Goalkeepers ===
- (South Africa) Doug Rudham
- (Scotland) Tommy Younger

=== Defenders ===
- (England) Gerry Byrne
- (England) John Molyneux
- (England) Ronnie Moran
- (England) Geoff Twentyman
- (England) Dick White

=== Midfielders ===
- (England) Alan A'Court
- (England) Bobby Campbell
- (Scotland) James Harrower
- (Scotland) Billy Liddell
- (England) Fred Morris
- (England) Johnny Morrissey
- (England) Johnny Wheeler
- (England) Barry Wilkinson

=== Forwards ===
- (England) Alan Arnell
- (England) Alan Banks
- (England) Louis Bimpson
- (England) Jimmy Melia
- (England) Bobby Murdoch

== Squad statistics ==
=== Appearances and goals ===
No.	Pos	Nat	Player	Total		Division 2		FA Cup	
No.	Pos	Nat	Player	Apps	Goals	Apps	Goals	Apps	Goals
	MF	(England) ENG	Alan A'Court	40	7	39	7	1	0
	FW	(England) ENG	Alan Arnell	12	5	12	5	0	0
	FW	(England) ENG	Alan Banks	3	2	3	2	0	0
	FW	(England) ENG	Louis Bimpson	16	11	15	11	1	0
	DF	(England) ENG	Gerry Byrne	1	0	1	0	0	0
	MF	(England) ENG	Bobby Campbell	10	1	10	1	0	0
	MF	(Scotland) SCO	Jimmy Harrower	38	6	37	6	1	0
	MF	(Scotland) SCO	Billy Liddell	19	14	19	14	0	0
	FW	(England) ENG	Jimmy Melia	40	21	39	21	1	0
	DF	(England) ENG	John Molyneux	38	1	37	1	1	0
	DF	(England) ENG	Ronnie Moran	41	0	40	0	1	0
	MF	(England) ENG	Fred Morris	41	12	40	12	1	0
	MF	(England) ENG	Johnny Morrissey	2	0	2	0	0	0
	FW	(England) ENG	Bobby Murdoch	2	0	2	0	0	0
	GK	(South Africa) RSA	Doug Rudham	1	0	1	0	0	0
	MF	(England) ENG	Roy Saunders	4	0	4	0	0	0
	DF	(England) ENG	Geoff Twentyman	26	5	25	4	1	1
	FW	(England) ENG	Johnny Wheeler	42	1	41	1	1	0
	DF	(England) ENG	Dick White	43	0	42	0	1	0
	MF	(England) ENG	Barry Wilkinson	12	0	12	0	0	0
	GK	(Scotland) SCO	Tommy Younger	42	0	41	0	1	0

== Table ==
Pos	Team	Pld	W	D	L	GF	GA	GAv	Pts	Qualification or relegation
2	Fulham (P)	42	27	6	9	96	61	1.574	60	Promotion to the First Division
3	Sheffield United	42	23	7	12	82	48	1.708	53	
4	Liverpool	42	24	5	13	87	62	1.403	53	
5	Stoke City	42	21	7	14	72	58	1.241	49	
6	Bristol Rovers	42	18	12	12	80	64	1.250	48	

Rules for classification: 1) Points; 2) Goal average; 3) Goals scored
(P) Promoted

== Results ==
=== Second Division ===
Date	Opponents	Venue	Result	Scorers	Attendance	Report 1	Report 2
23-Aug-58	Grimsby Town	H	3–3	Melia 19' Liddell (pen 39), 50'	47,502	Report	Report
30-Aug-58	Sunderland	A	1–2	Liddell 42'	36,168	Report	Report
03-Sep-58	Brighton & Hove Albion	H	5–0	Arnell 5', 18' Harrower 21' Banks 30' Molyneux 43'	39,520	Report	Report
06-Sep-58	Middlesbrough	A	1–2	Harrower 34'	35,000	Report	Report
10-Sep-58	Sheffield United	H	2–1	Liddell 33' Twentyman 85'	44,232	Report	Report
13-Sep-58	Charlton Athletic	H	3–0	Liddell 44' (pen 65) A'Court 87'	43,329	Report	Report
15-Sep-58	Sheffield United	A	0–2		14,727	Report	Report
20-Sep-58	Bristol City	A	3–1	Liddell 1', 55' Campbell 51'	26,896	Report	Report
24-Sep-58	Brighton & Hove Albion	A	2–2	Liddell 5' Morris 75'	21,323	Report	Report
27-Sep-58	Cardiff City	H	1–2	Banks 5'	41,866	Report	Report
04-Oct-58	Huddersfield Town	A	0–5		15,934	Report	Report
11-Oct-58	Lincoln City	H	3–2	Harrower 9' Morris 24', 36'	31,344	Report	Report
18-Oct-58	Fulham	A	1–0	Bimpson 83'	32,200	Report	Report
25-Oct-58	Sheffield Wednesday	H	3–2	Own goal 64' Morris (pen 66) Harrower 82'	39,912	Report	Report
01-Nov-58	Stoke City	A	2–0	Bimpson 73' Melia 83'	26,919	Report	Report
08-Nov-58	Leyton Orient	H	3–0	Twentyman 47' Bimpson 64' Melia 72'	34,920	Report	Report
15-Nov-58	Derby County	A	2–3	Own goal 8' Bimpson 33'	16,907	Report	Report
22-Nov-58	Bristol Rovers	H	2–1	Twentyman 70' Melia 84'	39,365	Report	Report
29-Nov-58	Ipswich Town	A	0–2		15,637	Report	Report
06-Dec-58	Swansea Town	H	4–0	Bimpson 11' Morris 27' Harrower 55' A'Court 73'	27,561	Report	Report
13-Dec-58	Scunthorpe United	A	2–1	Melia 5' A'Court 77'	11,194	Report	Report
20-Dec-58	Grimsby Town	A	3–2	Morris 43' Bimpson 48' A'Court 88'	10,004	Report	Report
26-Dec-58	Rotherham United	A	1–0	Melia 61'	12,960	Report	Report
27-Dec-58	Rotherham United	H	4–0	Morris 7' Bimpson 43', 63' Harrower 78'	44,729	Report	Report
03-Jan-59	Sunderland	H	3–1	Wheeler 29' Bimpson 58' Morris 73'	36,953	Report	Report
31-Jan-59	Charlton Athletic	A	3–2	Twentyman 38' Morris 60' Melia 63'	17,566	Report	Report
07-Feb-59	Bristol City	H	3–2	Arnell 2', 70' Melia 26'	34,091	Report	Report
14-Feb-59	Cardiff City	A	0–3		25,000	Report	Report
21-Feb-59	Huddersfield Town	H	2–2	Melia 44' Morris 82'	28,860	Report	Report
28-Feb-59	Leyton Orient	A	3–1	Melia 26' Morris 61' A'Court 71'	14,064	Report	Report
07-Mar-59	Fulham	H	0–0		43,926	Report	Report
20-Mar-59	Stoke City	H	3–4	Melia 3', 31' Bimpson 25'	35,507	Report	Report
27-Mar-59	Barnsley	H	3–2	Melia 16' Liddell 79', 83'	52,546	Report	Report
28-Mar-59	Lincoln City	A	1–2	Bimpson 26'	11,012	Report	Report
30-Mar-59	Barnsley	A	2–0	Melia 9', 68'	7,517	Report	Report
04-Apr-59	Derby County	H	3–0	Liddell 2' Melia 47', 72'	38,879	Report	Report
08-Apr-59	Middlesbrough	H	1–2	Melia 79'	36,288	Report	Report
11-Apr-59	Bristol Rovers	A	0–3		14,810	Report	Report
14-Apr-59	Sheffield Wednesday	A	0–1		28,264	Report	Report
18-Apr-59	Ipswich Town	H	3–1	Melia 14' Liddell 65' A'Court 88'	16,415	Report	Report
22-Apr-59	Scunthorpe United	H	3–0	Arnell 48' Liddell 61' Morris 73'	11,976	Report	Report
25-Apr-59	Swansea Town	A	3–3	A'Court 1' Melia 48', 67'	8,000	Report	Report

=== FA Cup ===
Date	Opponents	Venue	Result	Scorers	Attendance	Report 1	Report 2
15-Jan-59	Worcester City	A	1–2	Twentyman (pen 83)	15,011	Report	Report
