= John Nicholson (footballer, born 1936) =

English footballer

Personal information
- Full name: John Purcell Nicholson
- Date of birth: 21 September 1936
- Place of birth: Liverpool, England
- Date of death: 3 September 1966 (aged 29)
- Place of death: Doncaster, England
- Position: Centre-half

Senior career*
Years	Team	Apps	(Gls)
1957–1961	Liverpool	1	(0)
1961–1965	Port Vale	184	(1)
1965–1966	Doncaster Rovers	41	(0)
Total		226	(1)
- * Club domestic league appearances and goals

John Purcell Nicholson (21 September 1936 – 3 September 1966) was an English footballer. A "big, solid" centre-half, he played 254 league and cup games in a nine-year career in the Football League before his death at the age of 29.

He began his professional career with Liverpool in January 1957 but only played one game before being sold to Port Vale for a £2,000 fee in August 1961. He made a club record 208 consecutive appearances for the "Valiants" before being sold to Doncaster Rovers for £5,000 in September 1965. He helped Rovers to the Fourth Division title in 1965–66 before his death from a car crash in September 1966. He was posthumously inducted into the Doncaster Rovers Hall of Fame.

== Career ==
=== Liverpool ===
Nicholson signed professional forms with Liverpool in January 1957 to become understudy to Dick White. He was given his debut by Phil Taylor at Anfield on 10 October 1959, in a 2–2 draw with Brighton & Hove Albion; Willie Carlin also made his debut at the same time. He did not feature for the Second Division side under Bill Shankly in 1960–61 or 1961–62 as Shankly instead signed Ron Yeats from Dundee United.

=== Port Vale ===
He joined Port Vale for a £2,000 fee in August 1961. He made his debut in 1–1 draw with Northampton Town at the County Ground on 2 September 1961, the first of a club record 208 consecutive appearances. He scored his first senior goal on 16 October, in a 4–1 defeat to Southend United at Roots Hall. He made 50 appearances in 1961–62, having missed only the four Third Division games in August. He retained his first-team place as Norman Low was replaced by Freddie Steele in October 1962, and was an ever-present in the 1962–63 season, alongside goalkeeper Ken Hancock, as the "Valiants" finished third, one place and four points behind promoted Swindon Town. Nicholson was an ever-present in the 52 game 1963–64 season, and featured in the 0–0 draw with former club Liverpool at Anfield in the fourth round of the FA Cup; Vale lost the replay at Vale Park 2–1. He played all 49 games of the 1964–65 campaign, as Vale were relegated into the Fourth Division under Jackie Mudie. He was dropped on 8 September 1965, bringing to an end to his run of 208 consecutive games, and after protesting against this decision he was sold to Doncaster Rovers for £5,000 that month, in a move that outraged Vale supporters.

=== Doncaster Rovers ===
He played 41 league and cup games for Doncaster Rovers, as Rovers beat former club Port Vale 1–0 both at Vale Park and at Belle Vue. Manager Bill Leivers resigned in February 1966 and Nicholson worked closely with caretaker-managers Jackie Bestall and Frank Marshall as they led Doncaster to the Fourth Division title in 1965–66; they only finished ahead of Darlington on goal average. They were just three points above fifth place Tranmere Rovers. His career was cut short when he was killed in a car crash in Doncaster on 3 September 1966. The Port Vale directors donated 100 guineas to his widow. He left behind his wife, a young son, Steven John Nicholson and a daughter Janet Nicholson. Doncaster missed his assured presence at the back and were relegated in 1966–67 after conceding a massive 117 league goals (24 goals less than the Football League record). He was inducted into the club's Hall of Fame in February 2020 as the club's best player of the 1960s.

== Career statistics ==
Appearances and goals by club, season and competition
Club	Season	League			FA Cup		League Cup		Total	
Club	Season	Division	Apps	Goals	Apps	Goals	Apps	Goals	Apps	Goals
Liverpool	1956–57	Second Division	0	0	0	0	—		0	0
Liverpool	1957–58	Second Division	0	0	0	0	—		0	0
Liverpool	1958–59	Second Division	0	0	0	0	—		0	0
Liverpool	1959–60	Second Division	1	0	0	0	—		1	0
Liverpool	1960–61	Second Division	0	0	0	0	0	0	0	0
Liverpool	1961–62	Second Division	0	0	0	0	0	0	0	0
Liverpool	Total		1	0	0	0	0	0	1	0
Port Vale	1961–62	Third Division	42	1	7	0	1	0	50	1
Port Vale	1962–63	Third Division	46	0	4	0	1	0	51	0
Port Vale	1963–64	Third Division	46	0	5	0	1	0	52	0
Port Vale	1964–65	Third Division	46	0	2	0	1	0	49	0
Port Vale	1965–66	Fourth Division	4	0	0	0	2	0	6	0
Port Vale	Total		184	1	18	0	6	0	208	1
Doncaster Rovers	1965–66	Fourth Division	39	0	2	0	0	0	41	0
Doncaster Rovers	1966–67	Third Division	2	0	0	0	2	0	4	0
Doncaster Rovers	Total		41	0	2	0	2	0	45	0
Career total			226	1	20	0	8	0	254	1

== Honours ==
Doncaster Rovers

- Football League Fourth Division: 1965–66
