= Billy Liddell =

Scottish footballer (1922–2001)

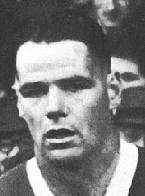

Personal information
- Full name: William Beveridge Liddell
- Date of birth: 10 January 1922
- Place of birth: Townhill, Fife, Scotland
- Date of death: 3 July 2001 (aged 79)
- Place of death: Liverpool, England
- Position: Winger

Youth career
- 1936–1937: Kingseat Juveniles
- 1937–1938: Lochgelly Violet F.C.

Senior career*
Years	Team	Apps	(Gls)
1938–1961	Liverpool	492	(215)

International career
- Scotland Schoolboys
1941–1942	English League XI	2	(1)
1942–1946	→ Scotland (wartime)	8	(3)
1942	Football Association XI	1	(1)
1943	Royal Air Force XI	2	(5)
1945	Scottish Services XI	2	(0)
1946–1955	Scotland	29	(8)
1947–1955	Great Britain XI	2	(0)
1955	Scotland A vs B trial	1	(0)
- * Club domestic league appearances and goals

William Beveridge Liddell (10 January 1922 – 3 July 2001) was a Scottish footballer who played his entire professional career with Liverpool. He signed with the club as a teenager in 1938 and retired in 1961, having scored 228 goals in 534 appearances (placing Liddell fifth and 12th in the respective club rankings as of December 2024). He was Liverpool's leading goalscorer in the league in eight out of nine seasons from 1949–50 to 1957–58, and surpassed Elisha Scott's club record for most league appearances in 1957.

With Liverpool, Liddell won a league championship in 1947 and featured in the club's 1950 FA Cup Final defeat by Arsenal. He represented Scotland at international level on 29 occasions. While serving as a Royal Air Force navigator during the Second World War, Liddell continued his career by appearing in unofficial games for Liverpool and guesting for various teams in the United Kingdom and Canada. After his retirement from football, in 1961, Liddell occupied himself as a Justice of the Peace (from 1958), bursar of Liverpool University, and voluntary worker. He died in 2001.

Primarily a left winger, Liddell's versatility enabled him to play comfortably on the opposite wing and as a striker, at centre and inside forward. Liddell became noted for his strong physique, acceleration, powerful shot, professionalism, and good conduct on the pitch. Such was his influence and popularity that the club acquired the contemporary nickname "Liddellpool". Posthumous recognition has included a plaque and a plinth unveiled in 2004 and 2018 at Anfield and sixth place in a poll of Liverpool fans, conducted in 2006 under the title "100 Players Who Shook The Kop". He was inducted into the Scottish Football Hall of Fame in November 2008.

== Early life ==
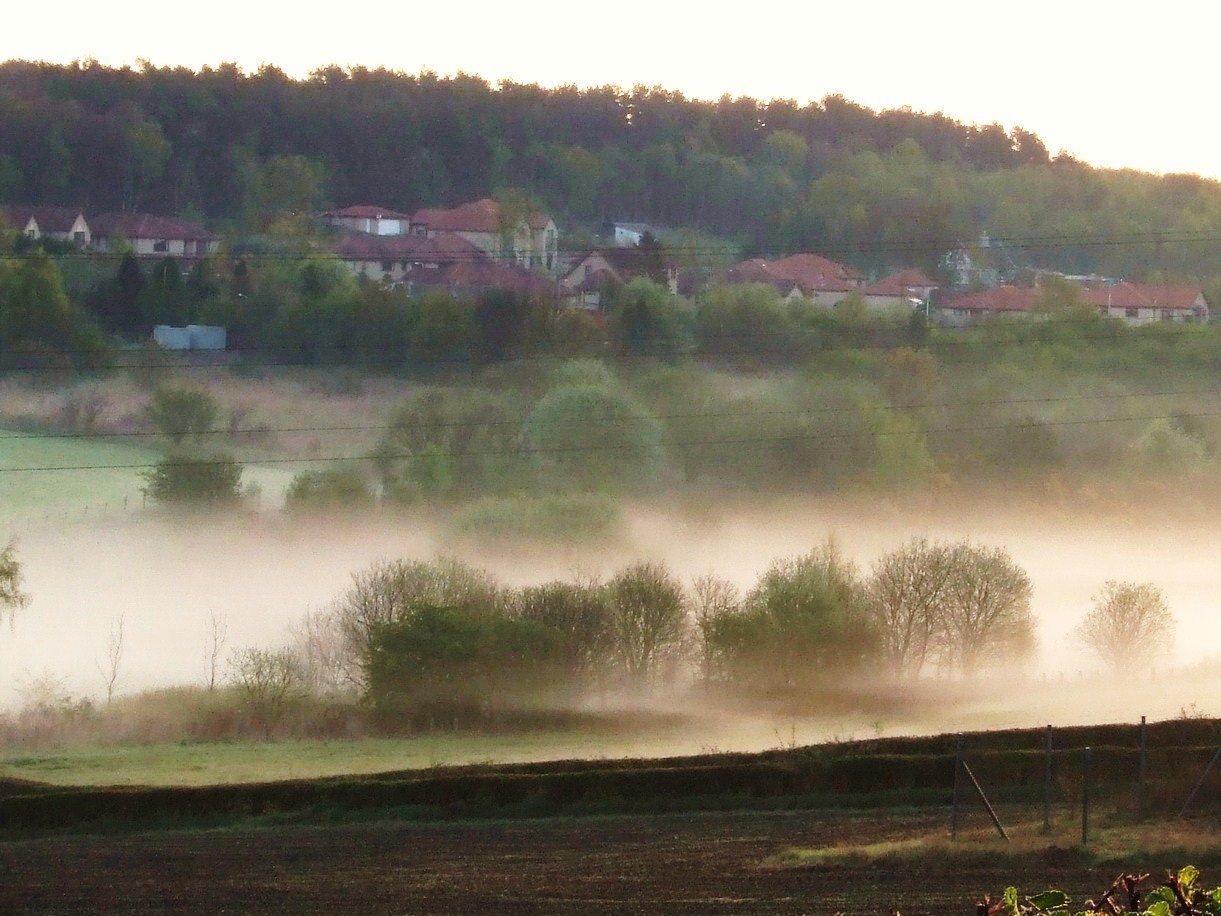
Townhill, located near Dunfermline

Born in Townhill, near Dunfermline, on 10 January 1922, Liddell was the eldest of coal miner James and wife Montgomery's six children. During his childhood, Liddell experienced austerity and poverty, with his family often having to subsist on bread, kail, and salt porridge. His parents became determined that he would not become a miner and helped him to decide a future career. He did not originally consider football as a viable profession, eventually choosing accountancy in preference to the civil service and church. His interest in football developed at a young age, which persuaded his parents, despite financial difficulties, to buy him a pair of football boots as a Christmas present when he asked for them aged seven. Liddell's participation in organised football began at age eight when he joined his school team, which had an average age of ten.

As a pupil at Dunfermline High School, Liddell studied chemistry, mathematics, physics, English and two other languages. He became a reluctant rugby player, under the guidance of retired Welsh international Ronnie Boon, while playing football for local teams and Scotland Schoolboys. By the age of 16, Liddell had progressed sufficiently to earn a contract with Lochgelly Violet football club and be sought after by Liverpool, Hamilton Academical, and Partick Thistle. Liverpool manager George Kay became interested in signing Liddell on the recommendation of the club's Scottish halfback Matt Busby, who learned of the teenager from Manchester City's Alex Herd while on a golf trip. Herd had forwent one of their rounds to take Willie McAndrew, manager of Hamilton, to watch Liddell play for Lochgelly. When Busby queried him about his absence and Liddell, Herd told him that a contract had not been agreed because limited resources prevented Hamilton from offering Liddell the assurances his parents insisted upon. Instead, Liddell signed for Liverpool as an amateur on 27 July 1938 and became a professional in 1939 on a weekly wage of £3. Negotiations between his parents and the club guaranteed, as a pre-requisite to acceptance, that Liverpool would permit Liddell to continue his accountancy studies, be housed in suitable accommodation, and be employed part-time an accountant at a company in the club's city.

Liddell entered the youth team on his arrival in 1938. Before he established himself in the side, Liddell had been frustrated at the frequent rotation of players until trainer Albert Shelley advised him to be patient. An injury incurred against Blackburn Rovers threatened to end his career prematurely. He had struck his knee against concrete near the corner flag after being challenged while running with the ball. Doctors informed him of the extent of tissue damage, causing Liddell anxiety about his future. He remained in Blackburn for two weeks, living in the family home of a colleague, before returning to Liverpool to continue his recovery. The Second World War precluded an official debut for Liddell, as the Football Association suspended competitive football from the abandoned 1939–1940 season and instituted a regional system in its place. Until the cessation of hostilities in 1945, Liddell guested for various domestic sides when unavailable for Liverpool and represented select teams, including a Football Association XI and Scottish Services XI. Liddell was capped eight times for Scotland during the war, scoring on his debut in a 5–4 win over England in 1942.

With Liverpool, Liddell competed in the various regional leagues that the FA assigned the club to and scored 82 goals in 152 matches between 1940 and 1946. He debuted on 1 January 1940 against Crewe Alexandra, scoring after two minutes in a 7–3 win. In his formative years, Liddell credited Matt Busby and Berry Nieuwenhuys as significant influences. He volunteered for the Royal Air Force and, despite wanting to qualify as a pilot, was trained as a navigator because of his proficiency at mathematics. After being mobilised in December 1942, Liddell guested with Chelsea and Cambridge Town. He broke his leg in a friendly kickabout while stationed in Bridgnorth, which required admission to the RAF Remedial Centre at Blackpool.

Following his recovery, Liddell travelled to Canada to complete a course at the Central Navigation School and became a pilot officer navigator. While on leave, he was used as a substitute by the Toronto Scottish under an assumed name and scored twice in a semi-final play-off. He was recalled to Moncton, New Brunswick, before the final. After some seven months in Canada, Liddell returned to Britain and, when based in Perth in 1944, accepted an offer to guest for his boyhood favourites Dunfermline Athletic. He subsequently moved to Northern Ireland for further training, where he declined an offer from former Liverpool goalkeeper Elisha Scott to guest for Belfast Celtic because of a prior agreement to play for Linfield. By the end of the war, Liddell had been assigned to 617 Squadron, helping to transport Allied soldiers back to Britain on leave from Italy.

== Club career ==
=== 1946–1954 ===
Most defenders knew who was windy amongst the opposition attack but Billy never chickened out. He was big, strong, speedy and he played it hard but fair. He put his heart and soul into the game. He was a great competitor.

He wasn't a Matthews or a Finney. He was direct, no frills. Even when you had taken the ball from him he'd have another bite at you.

— Harry Johnston, Blackpool and England defender.

Liddell's official debut for Liverpool came in the third round of the FA Cup, the first competitive football tournament to be organised in post-war England. He started in the first leg against Chester City on 5 January 1946 and scored in the 30th minute. The match ended in a 2–0 win and featured several additional debutants, including Bob Paisley, who would forge a chemistry with Liddell as a left half. League football completed its first full season under the provisional North and South divisional system, which facilitated the restoration of national football for the 1946–47 season. Although he established himself in the North League, scoring 17 goals in 42 matches, Liddell had yet to be discharged from the RAF and did not accompany Liverpool during its post-season tour of North America in May 1946. His unavailability extended to pre-season training and the first two matches of the 1946–47 season. On 7 September, Liddell registered his first official league appearance and scored twice in a 7–4 defeat of Chelsea.

In his inaugural season of competitive football, Liddell confirmed his status as a regular and contributed to Liverpool's first championship since 1923. Positioned on the left wing, he appeared in 34 matches, scored seven goals, and supplied strikers Albert Stubbins and Jack Balmer with numerous assists. Severe conditions in the winter disrupted the league's schedule and Liverpool did not secure the title until 14 June 1947. The club won its final game away against Wolves 2–1, with Liddell setting up one of the goals, but the championship was decided by Sheffield United defeating contenders Stoke in the season's last fixture. The game coincided with the Senior Cup Final between Liverpool and Everton at Anfield, where tannoys announced the result during the match. As a strict teetotaler, Liddell refrained from accepting glasses of champagne to celebrate the success.

The club was unable to replicate its form in the 1947–48 season, occupying 11th place on its conclusion in May 1948. Despite that, Liddell reached double figures with a total of 11 goals. He accompanied the club when it embarked on its second exhibition tour of North America. His displays against Sweden's Djurgården, played at the Brooklyn Dodgers' Ebbets Field, and North American teams earned him praise from journalists and gained him 13 goals in 11 matches. In the 1948–49 season, Liddell occupied left back and four forward positions. During his career, he would fill all ten outfield roles, mostly because of injuries to other players. His brother, Tom, became a teammate in 1949 after Liverpool signed him from Lochore Welfare. He never represented the club as a senior. The club finished in eighth in the 1949–50 season, going undefeated for a post-First World War record of 19 consecutive matches. Liddell scored ten goals in seven of those matches, including three braces.

Liverpool reached the FA Cup Final, making its first appearance at Wembley Stadium. Liddell had played in all seven matches during the club's progression, scoring critical goals against Blackpool and Everton. Demand for tickets far exceeded supply, with more than 100,000 applications being made for Liverpool's allocation of only 8,000. Liddell recalled being inundated with requests from friends, family, and Liverpudlians in general. Some 100,000 spectators witnessed Arsenal defeat Liverpool 2–0 on 29 April. Constant marking by Alex Forbes contained Liddell for much of the 90 minutes, and a tackle executed early in the game caused the winger pain. Journalist Brian Glanville questioned Arsenal's tactics and recalled being told by Liddell that he had been unable to put his jacket on the next day. Subsequent match reports by the media accused Forbes of acting with malice in his marking, which Liddell and Arsenal's Wally Barnes refuted. Liddell, who had scored 20 goals in all competitions, returned to Liverpool with his club after a trip to Brighton, to be greeted by thousands of supporters.

In 1950, Liddell became one of many players to be offered a transfer to Colombia by agents representing Independiente Santa Fe and Club Deportivo Los Millonarios. The clubs belonged to the DIMAYOR, unrecognised by FIFA because of a dispute between the league and the domestic governing body. Restrictions in England limited the weekly wage (£12 in the season and £10 during the summer) and impeded a player's ability to transfer to another club, which caused much discontent in British football until the system was reformed in the 1960s. Liddell chose to reject the contract offer, reportedly estimated at £12,000. His wife Phyllis, whom he married in 1946, later attributed the decision to club loyalty and the recent birth of twins. He later recalled that the proposal had been tempting, acknowledging that the decision would have been more challenging had it not been for the births. Many footballers did agree to contracts, including Alfredo Di Stefano, Neil Franklin, Charlie Mitten, and Hector Rial.

Manager George Kay resigned in January 1951 because of declining health and was replaced by former guest player Don Welsh. Before Kay's resignation, Liverpool failed to record a win in ten matches between September and November. Liddell ended the sequence in December with the deciding goal in a 1–0 defeat of Chelsea. The inconsistency continued for the rest of the season and Liverpool lost 3–1 to Third Division South Norwich City in the FA Cup third round. The club again underperformed in the 1951–52 season, in which Liddell scored a goal against Huddersfield Town described by contemporary media as the "shot of a lifetime" and reported in detail by the Liverpool Echo. When awarded a free kick outside the penalty box, Liverpool opted to have Kevin Baron take it instead of Liddell as was usual. Baron passed it to Liddell, who struck the ball with such force, after a momentary pause, that the shot surprised the Huddersfield defence and goalkeeper Harry Mills, and silenced spectators. Still played as a winger, Liddell finished the season with 19 goals in 40 league appearances. Liverpool only avoided relegation in the 1952–53 season by defeating Chelsea in the club's final fixture, in April 1953.

=== 1954–1961 ===
Liverpool's decline culminated in relegation to the Second Division in the 1953–54 season, finishing last with 28 points to end 50 seasons in the top division. The club had conceded 97 goals and failed to record an away win in 24 consecutive matches over a period of 14 months. Liddell, like the rest of his teammates, struggled for form, scoring just seven goals and missing a penalty in a 1–0 loss to Cardiff that confirmed relegation. Despite the club's descent, Liddell elected to stay rather than accept a transfer elsewhere.

The prospect of a second relegation, rather than promotion, dominated the club's thoughts at one stage in the 1954–55 season, yet a productive partnership formed. Liddell moved to centre forward, scoring 30 goals in 40 league appearances, one more than teammate John Evans. He scored Liverpool's solitary goal in its record 9–1 loss to Birmingham on 11 December 1954. To confound the sporting media, Liverpool went on to defeat Everton 4–0 in January, in an FA Cup fourth round fixture at Goodison Park before a crowd of 72,000. Goals from Liddell, A'Court, and Evans overcame the match favourites, with Liddell being characterised by the Liverpool Echo as "inspirational". The club was eliminated in the next round and finished 11th at the end of the season - its lowest ever finish.

Liddell assumed the captaincy in the 1955–56 season, in succession to Laurie Hughes. Although the club challenged for promotion, finishing third, the directors decided to dismiss Don Welsh and appoint former player Phil Taylor. Liddell scored 32 goals in the league and cup, including a hat-trick against Nottingham Forest. He could have had one more against Manchester City in an FA Cup fifth round replay at Anfield that Liverpool lost 2–1. Seconds before full-time, Liverpool dispossessed City and Liddell advanced from the halfway line to Bert Trautmann's goal, striking in the penalty box, reportedly just as the referee signalled to end the match. Along with Trautmann and many other players, Liddell had been unaware of the full-time whistle and Liverpool's supporters stayed in expectation of extra time until an announcement informed them of the scoreline.

In the following season, Liverpool finished a single point behind second-placed Nottingham Forest. While injuries to Louis Bimpson and Brian Jackson meant Liddell played much of the season as a right winger and inside right, he retained his place as the club's leading scorer, with 21 goals. Promotion again eluded the club in the 1957–58 season, while Liddell surpassed Elisha Scott's record of 430 league appearances (then erroneously believed to be 429) in November 1957 to acclaim. In recalling the match against Notts County, which it transpired only equalled the record, Liddell confessed to having felt self-conscious because of the attention that he received, while appreciative of the respect shown to his achievement, especially from his opponents, managed by friend Tommy Lawton.

As he approached the twilight of his career, Liddell slowed as a player and his appearances from the 1958–59 season became infrequent. He sought to mitigate his declining pace by adopting a deeper approach, with a "more thoughtful passing game". His omission from the lineup for the match against Fulham, in which Bimpson replaced him, provoked criticism from supporters, with some opposition being expressed via letters to local newspapers. Bimpson scored and Liddell's confinement to the reserves attracted the interest of Mersey neighbours New Brighton. The non-leaguers approached Liddell with an offer to become player-manager, which he and the club rejected. After one start in November, Liddell returned to the senior squad in March 1959 for his 466th league appearance, which the footballing community believed would surpass Ted Sagar's Merseyside record of 465. Liddell scored two goals in a 3–2 win over Barnsley at Anfield, but later learnt that Sagar's accepted total had been erroneous (463 being the correct figure). During his absence, Liverpool unexpectedly succumbed to part-time Worcester City in the third round of the FA Cup. Liddell had played in 40 consecutive cup fixtures, but his involvement in the 2–1 defeat had been limited to the studding of his colleagues' boots.

Liddell was some player...He had everything. He was fast, powerful, shot with either foot and his headers were like blasts from a gun. On top of all that he was as hard as granite. What a player! He was so strong – and he took a nineteen-inch collar shirt!

— Attributed to Bill Shankly, manager of Liverpool from 1959 to 1974

Having missed the 1959–60 season opener in August, Liddell replaced Bimpson for the match against Bristol City and scored a brace in a 4–2 win. He had numerous chances to complete a hat-trick, including two disallowed goals and a penalty taken by Jimmy Melia which the crowd had urged Liddell to take. He retained his place until an injury sustained in September granted Roger Hunt the opportunity to score on his league debut against Scunthorpe. Recurring injury further disrupted Liddell's season after his return against Middlesbrough and damage to knee ligaments in October rendered him unavailable for four months. Phil Taylor resigned in December due to deteriorating performances and was succeeded by Huddersfield's Bill Shankly. After Liddell recovered, Shankly selected him to play against Derby County in February, but the match had to be abandoned because of fog. He completed the next match, against Plymouth Argyle, and played in ten successive games, scoring his final goal for the club in a 5–1 defeat of Stoke in March.

For the match against Bristol Rovers in April, Shankly favoured an 18-year-old Ian Callaghan, considered by Liddell to be his successor. He received a standing ovation at the end of the match and ultimately broke Liddell's appearances record. Liddell's last league game came in the 1960–61 season, in a 1–0 defeat to Southampton. The match gave him the distinction of being the oldest footballer to play for the club in a post-war senior match (at 38 years and 224 days) until Kenny Dalglish in 1990. To recognise Liddell's 22-year service, Liverpool organised a testimonial in September between the club and an International XI at Anfield. The game had an attendance of 38,789 and generated £6,340 in revenue, enabling Liddell to purchase a home. He ended his career in the reserves and made his final appearance on 29 April 1961, scoring one of his side's five goals against Blackburn.

His influence gained the club the nickname "Liddellpool", but a retired Liddell insisted that he had never carried the team. In remembering Liddell in his "50 greatest Liverpool players", The Times' Tony Evans noted that he had been a leader who had inspired hope amongst the club's support in "bleak times". As of August 2010, Liddell remains the oldest player to score for Liverpool (at 38 years and 55 days), and is ranked as the club's fourth highest goalscorer, bettered only by Ian Rush (346 goals), Roger Hunt (286 goals), and Gordon Hodgson (241 goals).

== International career ==
Liddell debuted for Scotland in a 5–4 wartime win over England at Hampden Park, equalising Tommy Lawton's opening goal. He gained several more wartime caps. He gained his first full cap against Switzerland scoring twice in a 3–1 win at Hampden Park on 15 May 1946 At international level, Liddell played predominantly as an outside left, in competition with Scotland-based Lawrie Reilly and Willie Ormond. The Scottish Football Association (SFA) denied Liddell and his teammates the opportunity to participate in the 1950 World Cup, hosted by Brazil, because of an earlier decision not to sanction involvement as British Home Championship runners-up. The decision meant qualification depended on the final match against England on 25 May 1950, which Scotland lost 1-0 when joint-first needed only a draw. Despite pressure from players, the SFA maintained its position.

In 1951, Scotland won the Home Championship, with Liddell scoring twice. His goal against England in a 3–2 win followed a clash of heads with Wilf Mannion that fractured the English player's cheek bone. For the 1954 World Cup, the SFA decided to authorise World Cup participation regardless of placement. After a 3–3 draw with Wales, the SFA omitted Liddell from the starting lineup and he did not accompany the team to Switzerland. Scotland struggled in the World Cup and lost their two matches 1–0 and 7–0 to Austria and Uruguay, respectively. The team's first manager, Andy Beattie, resigned in protest because of SFA interference in the selection process.

Having been overlooked for four matches that followed, Liddell was re-called by the SFA after a 7–2 loss to England at Wembley. He returned as an outside left and scored one of Scotland's three goals against Portugal on 4 May 1955. His involvement in the tour of Yugoslavia, Austria and Hungary later in the month proved eventful. In a 2–2 draw with Yugoslavia, Liddell received a black eye when accidentally punched by goalkeeper Vladimir Beara while attempting a header. He scored his last goal for Scotland in an ill-tempered 4–1 win over Austria at Praterstadion, where a brief pitch invasion involving large numbers of supporters reportedly resulted in altercations between players and fans. Late in the match against Hungary, Liddell missed his second penalty for Scotland while the side were losing 3–1 to the "Golden Team". During his career with Liverpool, Liddell converted 34 of his 41 penalties.

Liddell gained two additional caps representing a Great Britain XI against the Rest of Europe in 1947 and 1955. He became one of only two players (the other being Stanley Matthews) to twice be selected. The first exhibition had been arranged to celebrate FIFA's readmission of the four Home Nations. Promoted as the "Match of the Century" and watched by 135,000 spectators, the game ended in an emphatic 6–1 victory for Britain. Liddell sustained a pulled muscle, which severely impaired his movement on the pitch and forced him out of two domestic matches. In the second match, organised to observe the 75th anniversary of the Irish FA's creation, the Rest of Europe won decisively by a scoreline of 4–1.

== Later life and legacy ==
Liddell settled in Liverpool with Phyllis and their twin sons, residing in Merseyside until his death. When his father died in January 1951, Liddell arranged for his mother, sister, and younger brothers to relocate to the city, concentrating his family in the region. While still a player, Liddell was appointed a Justice of the Peace for Liverpool in 1958 and contributed a column to the Echo's football edition. He became occupied with voluntary work, which entailed him being an occasional disc jockey for the Women's Voluntary Service at Alder Hey Children's Hospital, working for local youth clubs, and teaching at a Sunday school. Although religious, Liddell had not been a lay preacher as some believed. His wife dismissed it as a misapprehension, recalling that, while Liddell had abstained from drinking and smoking, he had not objected to others doing so in his presence and never "rammed any of his views down people's throats." After retiring in 1961, Liddell served as assistant permanent secretary and bursar to the University of Liverpool Guild of Undergraduates (Student Union) until 1984, and authored a memoir, titled "My Soccer Story".

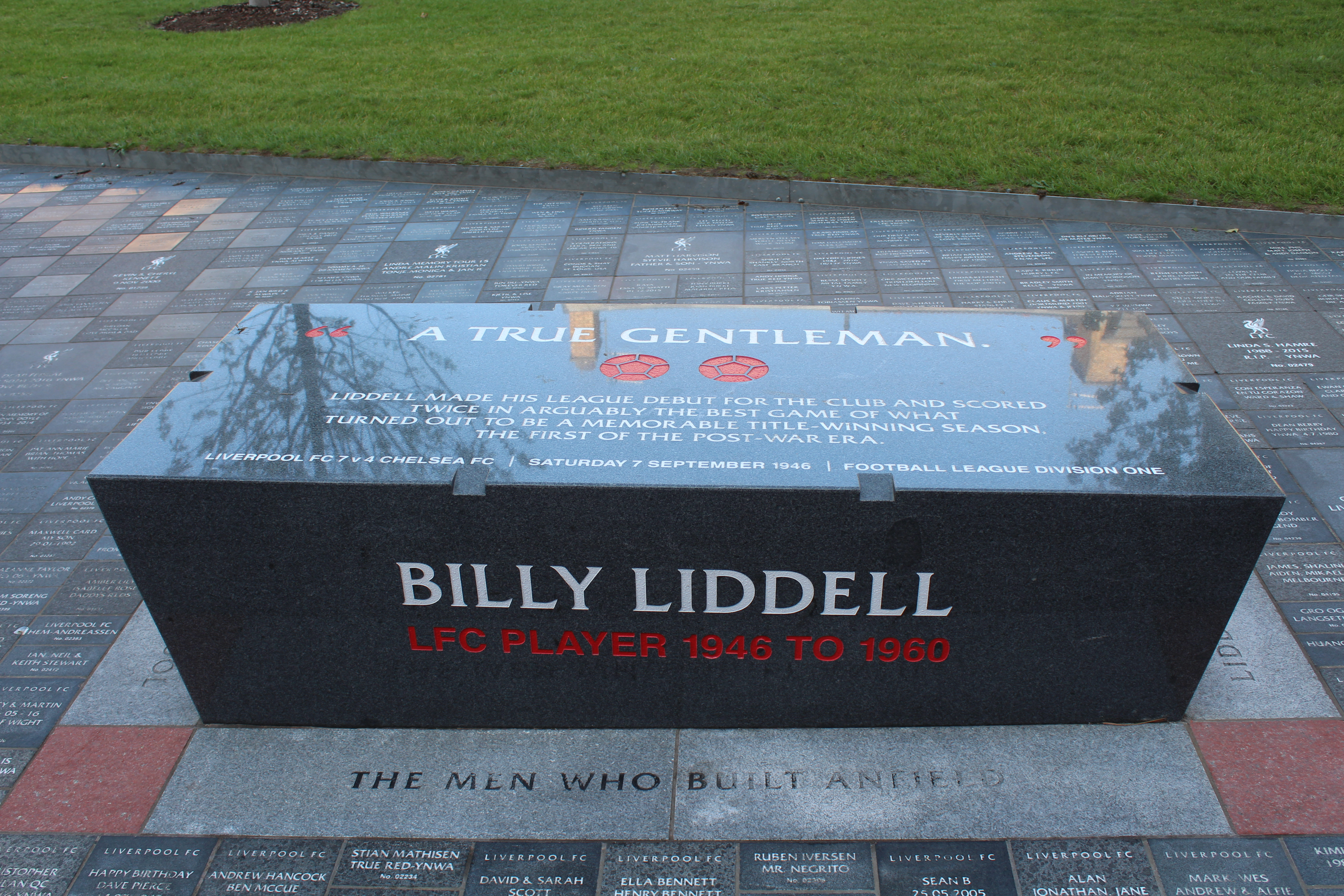
Liddell's plinth outside Anfield

While he had no desire to be a manager, Liddell, as a shareholder, had wanted to become a Liverpool director; however, his repeated applications to board elections were unsuccessful. He continued to play football for a magistrates' team until he decided to focus on tennis after breaking a cheek bone. In 1967, Liddell and other footballing personalities appeared in a charity match to generate funds for Bankfield House Community Centre. More than 10,000 people watched Liddell play opposite retired Hungarian international Ferenc Puskás at South Liverpool's Holly Park ground, raising £1,100 in the process. He later became chairman of Littlewoods' Spot the Ball panel and president of the Liverpool FC Supporters Club. After being diagnosed with Parkinson's disease in the early 1990s, Liddell resigned from the panel on the insistence of Phyllis. His wife had first noticed atypical behaviour on a visit to Anfield following the Hillsborough disaster in 1989, when he did not appear able to register what had happened in Sheffield. When his condition worsened, Liddell moved to a nursing home in Mossley Hill. He died on 3 July 2001, within a week of the deaths of former Liverpool manager Joe Fagan and director Tom Saunders.

In 2002, former Liverpool Reserve player Jimmy Rolfe loaned to Anfield Museum a No. 11 shirt believed to be the only surviving example worn by Liddell in the league. He had acquired it from trainer Albert Shelley on leaving for Chester in 1953. On 4 November 2004, widow Phyllis and Ian Callaghan unveiled a commemorative plaque adjacent to the museum. Liddell's biographer John Keith, who also presented on BBC Radio Merseyside, had proposed the memorial to then chairman David Moores and chief executive Rick Parry. Further recognition came in 2006 when Liddell attained sixth place in a poll of more than 110,000 people conducted by Liverpool's official website to determine a list of "100 Players Who Shook The Kop". When Liverpool approached former players to identify their personal favourites as a complement to the list, Ian Callaghan, Tommy Smith, David Johnson, and Roy Evans included Liddell in their "top five". The Football League included Liddell in a 1998 list of notable players, titled the "100 Legends".

The Billy Liddell Memorial Group formed in 2007 to advocate further recognition for Liddell, specifically in his home village of Townhill, and secure induction into the Scottish FA's Hall of Fame. A petition to the Scottish Parliament, to have Liddell inducted, succeeded in November 2008 when he became one of eight players admitted. His village renamed its sports complex in his honour and completed a memorial garden, with cairn, in May 2010. The Deputy Provost of Fife Council, Councillor Lizz Mogg, officially unveiled the cairn on the 22nd in the presence of Liddell's widow and other relatives. The memorial group announced its intention to disband in July, citing the success of its campaign.

== Honours ==
Liverpool

- English First Division: 1946–47
- FA Cup Runner-up: 1949–50

== Career statistics ==
=== Club ===
Appearances and goals by club, season and competition
Club	Season	League			FA Cup		Total	
Club	Season	Division	Apps	Goals	Apps	Goals	Apps	Goals
Liverpool	1945–46	First Division	0	0	2	1	2	1
Liverpool	1946–47	First Division	34	7	6	1	40	8
Liverpool	1947–48	First Division	37	10	2	1	39	11
Liverpool	1948–49	First Division	38	8	4	1	42	9
Liverpool	1949–50	First Division	41	17	7	2	48	19
Liverpool	1950–51	First Division	35	15	1	0	36	15
Liverpool	1951–52	First Division	40	19	3	0	43	19
Liverpool	1952–53	First Division	39	13	1	0	40	13
Liverpool	1953–54	First Division	36	7	1	0	37	7
Liverpool	1954–55	Second Division	40	30	4	1	44	31
Liverpool	1955–56	Second Division	39	27	5	5	44	32
Liverpool	1956–57	Second Division	41	21	1	0	42	21
Liverpool	1957–58	Second Division	35	22	5	1	40	23
Liverpool	1958–59	Second Division	19	14	0	0	19	14
Liverpool	1959–60	Second Division	17	5	0	0	17	5
Liverpool	1960–61	Second Division	1	0	0	0	1	0
Career total			492	215	42	13	534	228

=== International ===
Appearances and goals by national team and year
National team	Year	Apps	Goals
Scotland	1946	3	2
Scotland	1947	2	0
Scotland	1948	1	0
Scotland	1949	1	0
Scotland	1950	6	1
Scotland	1951	3	1
Scotland	1952	6	2
Scotland	1953	2	0
Scotland	1955	5	2
Total		29	8

Scores and results list Scotland's goal tally first, score column indicates score after each Liddell goal.

List of international goals scored by Billy Liddell
No.	Date	Venue	Opponent	Score	Result	Competition
–	18 April 1942	Hampden Park, Glasgow, Scotland	England	1–1	5–4	Wartime friendly
–	2 February 1946	Windsor Park, Belfast	Ireland	1–1	3–2	Wartime friendly
–	2 February 1946	Windsor Park, Belfast	Ireland	3–2	3–2	Wartime friendly
1	15 May 1946	Hampden Park, Glasgow	Switzerland	1–1	3–1	Friendly
2	15 May 1946	Hampden Park, Glasgow	Switzerland	2–1	3–1	Friendly
3	21 October 1950	Ninian Park, Cardiff, Wales	Wales	3–1	3–1	1951 British Home Championship
4	14 April 1951	Wembley Stadium, London, England	England	3–1	3–2	1951 British Home Championship
5	30 May 1952	Råsunda Stadium, Stockholm, Sweden	Sweden	1–2	1–3	Friendly
6	18 October 1952	Hampden Park, Glasgow, Scotland	Wales	2–1	2–1	1953 British Home Championship
7	4 May 1955	Hampden Park, Glasgow, Scotland	Portugal	2–0	3–0	Friendly
8	19 May 1955	Praterstadion, Vienna, Austria	Austria	3–0	4–1	Friendly

== Honours ==
Liverpool

- FA Cup runner-up: 1949–50

== See also ==
- List of footballers in England by number of league goals (200+)
