= The Boot Room =

Famous room at Anfield, Liverpool F.C. home

The Boot Room was a famous room at Anfield, the home of Liverpool F.C.

From the 1960s to the early 1990s it was a meeting place where the Liverpool coaching staff would sit, drink tea and discuss the team, tactics and ways of defeating the next opposing side. Formed upon manager Bill Shankly's arrival at Liverpool in 1959, the Boot Room became an "unofficial institution" at the club and would produce four future managers – Bob Paisley, Joe Fagan, Kenny Dalglish and Roy Evans – over a period of thirty-nine years.

== Details ==
The Boot Room was a small room near the changing rooms that stored the squad's football boots. Bill Shankly converted it into an informal coaches' meeting room, with a relaxing atmosphere that paid dividends for a Liverpool side who were rebuilding at the time. The original members of the Boot Room were Shankly, Bob Paisley, Reuben Bennett, Tom Saunders, Joe Fagan and Ronnie Moran. Neither Bennett nor Saunders ever went on to manage the club, however it was Bennett who remained at Anfield the longest.

Out of the five, Saunders was the only one to hold a full coaching certificate, but among them they provided the common thread that held Liverpool together for almost 40 years. Each man filled a specific role; Paisley was a tactician who had an eye for spotting a transfer target. Bennett, who was closest to Shankly, was the link to the manager. Fagan, in Roy Evans' words, was "the glue that held everything together". Fagan, however inadvertently, could claim to have founded the Boot Room in the sense that he was the first to store the crates of Guinness, given as a thank-you from the brewery's team, in the Room. They were joined in 1967 when Shankly asked former Liverpool player Geoff Twentyman to join the boot room staff as chief scout.

Paisley was familiar with Liverpool's traditions, having served the club as a player, physiotherapist, and coach. He also understood the expectations surrounding the team. Fagan was known for his reserved manner and was regarded highly by Shankly, who had unsuccessfully attempted to sign him while managing Grimsby Town. Reuben Bennett was a friend and colleague of Shankly and had also played professionally. Following Shankly's retirement in 1974, the Boot Room tradition continued under managers Paisley, Fagan, and Kenny Dalglish during one of the club's most successful periods.

In his diary, Fagan said about the Boot Room, "In time it would become furnished with luxuries like a rickety old table and a couple of plastic chairs, a tatty piece of carpet on the floor and a calendar on a wall that would later be adorned with photographs, ripped from newspapers, of topless models...there was little evidence to suggest this room was even part of a football club."

The Boot Room was also used for the training of future Liverpool managers. It became known as "the Liverpool Way" to promote from within so that the wheels would carry on turning smoothly in the event of a manager leaving. Paisley, Fagan and Ronnie Moran, who stepped in as caretaker manager on several occasions, were all trained in the Boot Room. Although Kenny Dalglish was not "educated" in the Boot Room, he realised the values that it brought and kept it during his tenure. The Boot Room was eventually demolished to make way for a press room during Graeme Souness' reign as manager in 1993. Contrary to popular belief the renovation of the boot room was a requirement rather than a request by Graeme Souness that it be demolished. After Souness had left the club, the boot room was to produce yet another manager in Roy Evans. Evans took over at the helm after a long education that had begun under Shankly.

== Boot Room Honours ==
=== Bill Shankly ===
- Football League First Division (3): 1963–64, 1965–66, 1972–73
- Football League Second Division (1): 1961–62
- FA Cup (2): 1964–65, 1973–74
- FA Charity Shield (3): 1964, 1965 , 1966
- UEFA Cup (1): 1972–73

=== Bob Paisley ===
- Football League First Division (6): 1975–76, 1976–77, 1978–79, 1979–80, 1981–82, 1982–83
- League Cup (3): 1980–81, 1981–82, 1982–83
- FA Charity Shield (6): 1974, 1976, 1977, 1979, 1980, 1982
- European Cup (3): 1976–77, 1977–78, 1980–81
- UEFA Cup (1): 1975–76
- UEFA Super Cup (1): 1977

=== Joe Fagan ===
- Football League First Division (1): 1983–84
- League Cup (1): 1983–84
- European Cup (1): 1983–84

=== Kenny Dalglish ===
- Football League First Division (3): 1985–86, 1987–88, 1989–90
- FA Cup (2): 1985–86, 1988–89
- League Cup (1): 2011–12
- Football League Super Cup (1): 1986
- FA Charity Shield (4): 1986, 1988, 1989, 1990

=== Roy Evans ===
- League Cup (1): 1994–95
