= Geoff Molyneux =

English footballer

Personal information
- Full name: Geoffrey Barry Molyneux
- Date of birth: 23 January 1943 (age 83)
- Place of birth: Warrington, England
- Position: Winger

Youth career
- Rylands Youth Club

Senior career*
| Years | Team | Apps | (Gls) |
| 1962–1963 | Chester | 1 | (0) |
| 1963–? | New Brighton | | |
- * Club domestic league appearances and goals

Geoff Molyneux (born 23 January 1943) is an English former footballer who played as a winger.

== Playing career ==
The younger brother of Liverpool and Chester defender John Molyneux, Geoff joined Chester as an amateur from Rylands Youth Club in Warrington in 1962. He made his only appearance in The Football League in a 3–1 win over Exeter City (with John also in the side) on 22 September 1962, also playing in a Football League Cup tie with Mansfield Town four days later.

He did not make any more first-team appearances for Chester and quickly dropped into the Cheshire County League with New Brighton.
