= Brian Jackson (footballer, born 1933) =

English footballer (1933–2020)

Personal information
- Full name: Brian Jackson
- Date of birth: 1 April 1933
- Place of birth: Walton-on-Thames, England
- Date of death: 14 February 2020 (aged 86)
- Position: Outside right

Youth career
- Weybridge Schools
- Chase of Chertsey
- Arsenal

Senior career*
Years	Team	Apps	(Gls)
1950–1951	Leyton Orient	38	(2)
1951–1958	Liverpool	125	(12)
1958–1962	Port Vale	159	(29)
1962–1964	Peterborough United	47	(4)
1964	Lincoln City	10	(1)
1964–1965	Burton Albion		
1965–1966	Boston United		
Total		379	(48)
- * Club domestic league appearances and goals

Brian Jackson (1 April 1933 – 14 February 2020) was an English professional footballer of the 1950s. He scored 53 goals in 409 league and cup appearances in a 14-year career in the Football League.

An outside-right, he moved from Leyton Orient to Liverpool for £6,500 in November 1951. After playing seven years at Anfield, he was sold to Port Vale for £1,700 in July 1958. He helped the "Valiants" to win the Fourth Division title in 1958–59, before he was sold to Peterborough United for £2,000 in June 1962. He later played for Lincoln City, Burton Albion, and Boston United.

== Career ==
Jackson began his career as an amateur with Arsenal before he joined Leyton Orient at the age of 17. He made 38 appearances in the Third Division South for Alec Stock's O's in the 1950–51 season. He impressed in his creative performances at Brisbane Road, enough so that Liverpool manager Don Welsh paid £6,500 and part-exchanged Don Woan to bring the 18-year-old to the club in November 1951. He made his debut on 10 November 1951 at Anfield in a league match against Bolton Wanderers; Jackson's first goal for the club in the 61st minute was enough for the "Reds" to get a point from a 1–1 draw. He went on to tally up 15 First Division appearances in the 1951–52 season. However, he never established himself in the Liverpool side and featured only five times in the 1952–53 campaign. He scored four goals in 28 games in 1953–54, as Liverpool suffered relegation. He featured in 23 Second Division games in the 1954–55 campaign, before posting 15 appearances in 1955–56 and 19 appearances in 1956–57, as Liverpool twice finished in third place. He played 24 games in the 1957–58 campaign, as Phil Taylor's side finished two points short of promotion. His stay at Liverpool lasted for six and a half years and he managed 133 senior appearances, mostly in his preferred outside right position, never really establishing himself as a first-team regular.

In July 1958, he joined Port Vale for a £1,700 fee as a replacement for recently sold winger Colin Askey. He scored eight goals in 38 games in the 1958–59 season, ad provided many assists as the "Valiants" won the Fourth Division title. He scored 11 goals in 53 appearances in the 1959–60 season, including Vale's consolation goal against Aston Villa in the FA Cup fifth round defeat at Vale Park. He went on to claim ten goals in 47 appearances in the 1960–61 campaign, as Vale rose to seventh in the league. He then scored seven goals in 42 games in the 1961–62 campaign, before manager Norman Low decided to sell him on to Jimmy Hagan's Peterborough United for £2,000 in June 1962. Low had aimed to raise money to buy a new forward. Jackson helped Jack Fairbrother's "Posh" to finish sixth in the Third Division in 1962–63 and then tenth in 1963–64. Jackson left London Road for Bill Anderson's Fourth Division Lincoln City. He succeeded Bud Houghton as club captain in September 1964. He departed the "Imps" at Sincil Bank for Peter Taylor's Southern League side Burton Albion. After leaving Eton Park, he later turned out for Boston United.

== Style of play ==
Jackson was a pacey winger who excelled at providing crosses for the forwards and also had good technical skills such as penalty taking.

== Later life ==
After leaving the game, Jackson settled in the Ermine in Lincoln and worked as a teacher, gardener and road worker until his retirement at 65.

He had seven grandchildren, seven great-grandchildren and six great-great-grandchildren

== Career statistics ==
Appearances and goals by club, season and competition
Club	Season	League			FA Cup		League Cup		Total	
Club	Season	Division	Apps	Goals	Apps	Goals	Apps	Goals	Apps	Goals
Leyton Orient	1950–51	Third Division South	21	2	0	0	—		21	2
Leyton Orient	1951–52	Third Division South	17	0	0	0	—		17	0
Leyton Orient	Total		38	2	0	0	0	0	38	2
Liverpool	1951–52	First Division	14	1	1	0	—		15	1
Liverpool	1952–53	First Division	5	0	0	0	—		5	0
Liverpool	1953–54	First Division	27	4	1	0	—		28	4
Liverpool	1954–55	Second Division	23	3	3	0	—		26	3
Liverpool	1955–56	Second Division	15	0	0	0	—		15	0
Liverpool	1956–57	Second Division	19	2	0	0	—		19	2
Liverpool	1957–58	Second Division	22	2	2	0	—		24	2
Liverpool	Total		125	12	7	0	0	0	132	12
Port Vale	1958–59	Fourth Division	37	8	3	1	—		40	9
Port Vale	1959–60	Third Division	45	8	6	1	—		51	9
Port Vale	1960–61	Third Division	43	8	3	2	1	0	47	10
Port Vale	1961–62	Third Division	34	5	7	2	1	0	42	7
Port Vale	Total		159	29	19	6	2	0	178	34
Peterborough United	1962–63	Third Division	22	2	3	0	0	0	25	2
Peterborough United	1963–64	Third Division	25	2	0	0	1	0	26	2
Peterborough United	Total		47	4	3	0	1	0	51	4
Lincoln City	1964–65	Fourth Division	10	1	0	0	0	0	10	1
Career total			379	48	29	6	3	0	411	54

== Honours ==
Port Vale

- Football League Fourth Division: 1958–59
