= Spot the ball =

Type of newspaper contest

Spot the ball is a traditional newspaper promotion, where the player has to guess the position of a ball which has been removed from a photograph of a ball sport, especially association football.

A spot-the-ball competition may be classed as betting, a prize competition, or a lottery, depending on its form. If it is classed as a prize competition, the promoter does not need a betting operating licence to run it.

In the United Kingdom, the last big payout was in 2004.
