= Reginald Blore =

Welsh footballer

Reginald Blore (born 18 March 1942) is a Welsh former footballer who played as a midfielder.

Reginald Blore played centre forward, played for Liverpool, moved to Southport in 1960, then moved to Blackburn Rovers for around £5,000 in November 1963.
