= John Evans (footballer, born 1929) =

English footballer (1929–2004)

Personal information
- Full name: John William Evans
- Date of birth: 28 August 1929
- Place of birth: Tilbury, England
- Date of death: 6 January 2004 (aged 74)
- Place of death: Essex, England
- Position: Striker

Youth career
- 1948: Watford
- 1948–1949: Tilbury

Senior career*
| Years | Team | Apps | (Gls) |
| 1949–1953 | Charlton Athletic | 90 | (38) |
| 1953–1957 | Liverpool | 96 | (49) |
| 1957–1960 | Colchester United | 56 | (22) |
| 1960–1962 | Romford | 70 | (26) |
| 1962–1965 | Ford United | | |

Managerial career
- 1965–1966: Grays Athletic
- * Club domestic league appearances and goals

John William Evans (28 August 1929 – 6 January 2004) was a footballer with Liverpool between 1953 and 1957.

== Life and playing career ==
Born in Tilbury, Essex, England, Evans played for Tilbury as an amateur and Charlton Athletic before Reds manager Don Welsh paid £12,500 for his services on Christmas Day 1953, He made his debut, along with full-back Frank Lock, the following day in a Boxing Day fixture at Anfield, W.B.A were the visitors for the league match which ended in a goalless draw. His first goal for the club came a week later on 2 January 1954, again, in a league match at Anfield: this time Bolton Wanderers were the guests. Evans' second-minute strike wasn't enough to fend off the men from Burnden Park as Bolton won 2–1.

Evans came to Liverpool with a good reputation for finding the back of the net having scored 38 goals in 90 appearances for Charlton, a goal every 2.3 games. He was soon into his stride in the red of Liverpool with a goal in his second appearance for the club. However, the club was going through its roughest phase of its history and Evans' eye for goal was affected only scoring 5 goals in the 16 matches he appeared in, not enough to stop Liverpool from being relegated to the Second Division.

Evans is one of only three Liverpool FC players to score 5 goals in one game, the others being Ian Rush and Robbie Fowler.

Evans was a regular fixture in the starting line-up in the Reds first season in the lower tier playing in 38 league games and four FA Cup matches, in fact he was only two appearances behind the great Billy Liddell who topped the appearance chart for the 1954–55 season. Evans did finish as the club's leading goalscorer though scoring 29 league and four cup goals compared to 30 league and one cup goal for Liddell, even though Liddell and Evans notched a more than healthy 59 goals between them it wasn't enough to gain Liverpool instant promotion back to the big time, they finished a very disappointing 11th 12 points behind champions Birmingham City, second placed Luton Town and third placed Rotherham United who all finished on 54 points.

It was during this season that he became one of only three players to have scored five goals in one match for Liverpool, it happened on 15 September 1954 in a league match at Anfield and his victims were Bristol Rovers, his goals came in the 7th, 39th, 40th, 70th an 85th minutes and were, unsurprisingly, enough to see off Rovers even though they managed to score three in the 5–3 thriller. He also managed to score four when Liverpool travelled to Gigg Lane to face Bury.

The following campaign, 1955–56, was less productive for Evans who scored 13 from 36 league and cup appearances, as Liverpool finished just outside the promotion places on 48 points, four shy of second placed Leeds United. The 1956–57 season wasn't the best for Evans as he only managed to hit the net twice from 11 outings as the Reds went with a certain Jimmy Melia.

Evans only made one appearance at the beginning of the next campaign and after scoring a goal every other game during his time at Anfield he was allowed to leave in November 1957, he joined Colchester United where he managed to hit the net 22 times. Evans also went on to play for Romford, in his home county of Essex and Ford United as an amateur.
