= Fred Perry (footballer) =

English footballer

Personal information
- Full name: Frederick Noel Perry
- Date of birth: 30 October 1933
- Place of birth: Cheltenham, England
- Date of death: 11 July 2016 (aged 82)
- Place of death: Sutton, London, England
- Position: Defender

Senior career*
Years	Team	Apps	(Gls)
19??–1954	Worthing		
1954–1957	Liverpool	1	(0)
1957–1959	Sittingbourne		
- * Club domestic league appearances and goals

Frederick Noel Perry (30 October 1933 – 11 July 2016) was an English footballer who played as a defender in the Football League for Liverpool. He also played non-league football for clubs including Worthing and Sittingbourne.
