= John Molyneux (footballer) =

English footballer (1931–2018)

John Molyneux (3 February 1931 – 7 March 2018) was an English footballer who played as a right-back.

== Life and playing career ==
Born in Warrington, Lancashire, England, Molyneux began his career with Chester, breaking into the side early in 1949–50 in place of captain Eric Sibley. He went on to play regularly for the club in Football League Division Three North until Liverpool manager Don Welsh paid £4,500 on 23 June 1955.

Molyneux made his Liverpool debut on 3 September the same year in a 2nd Division game at Ewood Park, as the Reds and Blackburn Rovers shared the points in an exciting 3–3 draw. John's first goal didn't arrive until 8 January 1958 in a FA Cup 3rd round replay at Roots Hall after Southend United had earned a draw at Anfield, Liverpool again made hard work of the tie but Molyneux's 1st-minute strike helped them gain a 3–2 victory, but only after late goals from Dick White (79th) and Tony Rowley (81st).

John spent six seasons at Liverpool as a full-back. During the club's promotion season of 1961–62 he was a peripheral figure playing just 3 league games and 1 cup match, as partnership developed had been developed by Gerry Byrne and Ronnie Moran.

Bill Shankly then decided that John was no longer a part of his plans and was allowed to leave in the August 1962 after clocking up 249 appearances. Molyneux rejoined former club Chester, where he played for two more years before dropping into non-league football with New Brighton.

John's brother, Geoff, also played in The Football League for Chester.

In March 2018 it was announced that Molyneux had died at the age of 87.

== Career details ==
- Chester City (1949–55; 1962–64) - 245 league appearances, 1 goal
- Liverpool F.C. (1955–1962) - 249 appearances, 3 goals
- England - Youth international
