= John Price (footballer, born 1936) =

Welsh footballer

Personal information
- Date of birth: 22 November 1936 (age 89)
- Place of birth: Aberystwyth, Wales
- Position: Full-back

Youth career
- Fordhouse Youth Club

Senior career*
Years	Team	Apps	(Gls)
1954–1957	Liverpool	1	(0)
1957	Aston Villa	0	(0)
1957–1958	Walsall	0	(0)
1958–1959	Shrewsbury Town	9	(0)
Total		10	(0)
- * Club domestic league appearances and goals

John Price (born 22 November 1936) is a Welsh former footballer who played as a defender.

He made his debut for Liverpool on 19 November 1955 in a 4-2 Second Division defeat to Leeds United, but did not play for the team again. He later signed for Aston Villa but did not make a senior appearance for the club, before joining Walsall and subsequently Shrewsbury Town.
