= Joe Dickson (footballer) =

English footballer

Personal information
- Full name: Joe Dickson
- Date of birth: 31 January 1934
- Place of birth: Liverpool, England
- Date of death: 1990 (aged 55–56)
- Position: Forward

Senior career*
Years	Team	Apps	(Gls)
1952–1958	Liverpool	6	(4)
1958–1960	Headington United		
- * Club domestic league appearances and goals

Joe Dickson (31 January 1934 – 1990) was an English footballer who played for Liverpool.
