= Geoff Twentyman =

English footballer (1930–2004)

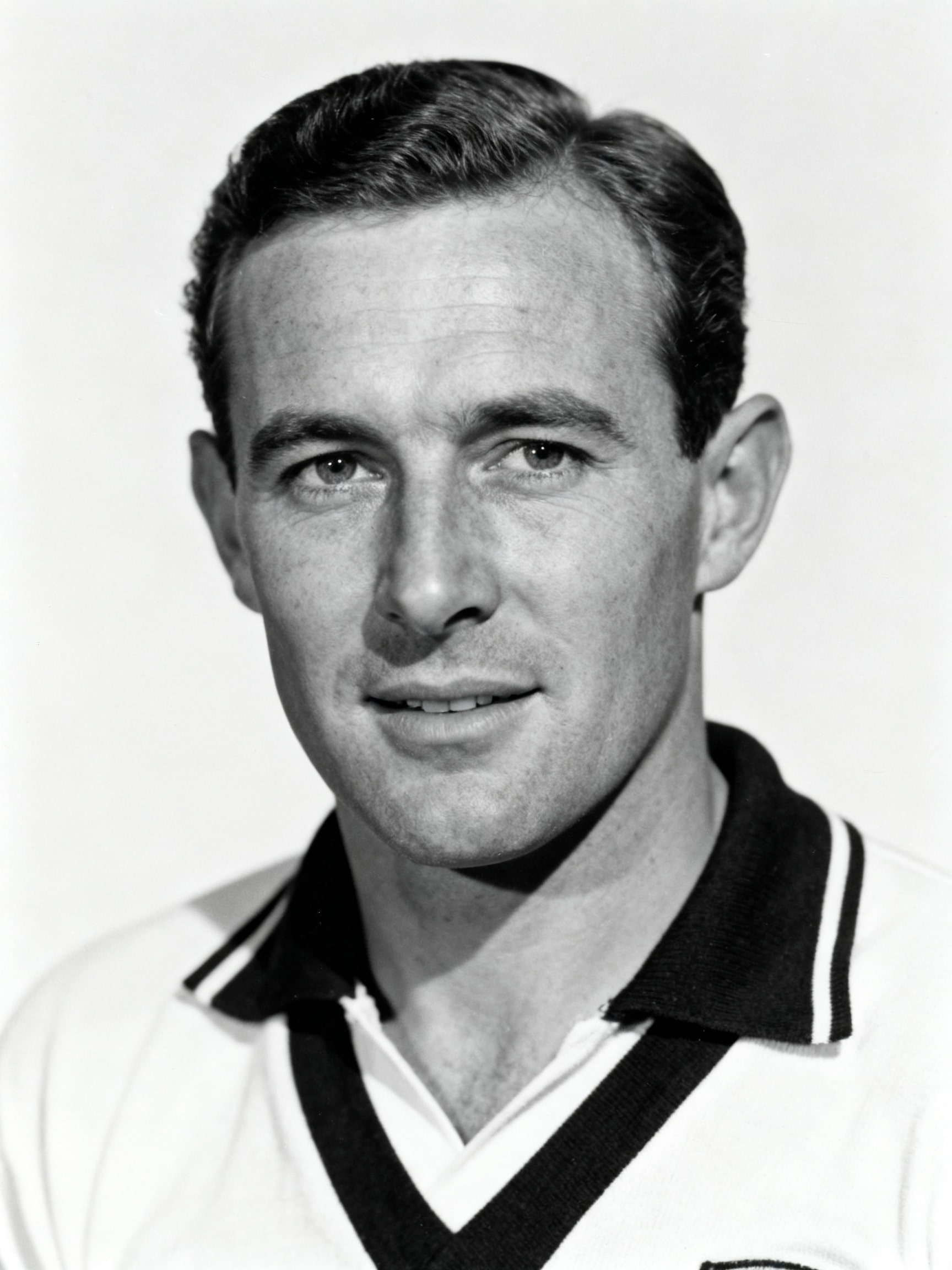
- Geoff Twentyman historical image

Personal information
- Full name: Geoffrey Twentyman
- Date of birth: 19 January 1930
- Place of birth: Brampton, England
- Date of death: 16 February 2004 (aged 74)
- Place of death: Southport, England
- Position: Central defender

Senior career*
Years	Team	Apps	(Gls)
1947–1953	Carlisle United	149	(2)
1953–1959	Liverpool	170	(18)
1959–1963	Ballymena United		
1963–1964	Carlisle United	10	(0)

Managerial career
- 1960–1963: Ballymena United
- 1964–1965: Morecambe
- 1965: Hartlepools United
- * Club domestic league appearances and goals

Geoffrey Twentyman (19 January 1930 – 16 February 2004) was an English footballer who is mainly remembered for his links with Liverpool F.C. as both a player and as chief scout.

== Playing career ==
Born in Brampton, Cumberland, the left-half played for Swift Rovers as an amateur and Carlisle United. Twentyman stood 5 ft 11 in (1.80 m) and made his name at Carlisle as a centre-back having been switched there by Bill Shankly during his spell as manager of the Brunton Park club.

He was spotted by Don Welsh, who signed him for Liverpool in December 1953 for £10,000, he made his debut on 19 December in a league match against arch rivals Manchester United at Old Trafford. United won 5–1. His first goal came almost a year later on 9 November 1954 in a 2–1 win over Hull City in a Second Division match at Anfield.

Twentyman's signature could not prevent them from being relegated by the end of his first season at the club. All of Twentyman's Liverpool appearances were during the days when they struggled to get out of the Second Division, even though they were finishing consistently just outside the promotion places. Twentyman featured in 184 matches scoring 19 goals before leaving Liverpool.

He went on to become player/manager of Irish side Ballymena United. Ironically, he left the Reds just nine months before the arrival of his former manager Bill Shankly. After his spell at Ballymena, Twentyman returned to play for Carlisle for a second time, he also went on to represent Morecambe and Penrith.

== Managerial and scouting career ==
After his retirement Twentyman had a short four-month spell as the boss of Hartlepools United before being replaced by Brian Clough. He was then invited by Shankly to return to Liverpool in 1967 to join The Boot Room in the role of chief scout. It was in this role that Twentyman made his name at Liverpool, discovering such talents as Ian Rush at Chester (£300,000), who became captain and ended up Liverpool's all-time record goalscorer; Phil Neal at Northampton Town (£66,000), who became skipper and won the most medals by a single player in the Reds history; and Alan Hansen at Partick Thistle (£100,000), who also became club captain and won numerous domestic and UEFA honours to name but three. Twentyman eventually spent 21 years in the role working for the likes of Bob Paisley, Joe Fagan and Kenny Dalglish, before he finally left in 1986.

He went on to become chief scout for Rangers when former Reds Captain Graeme Souness came calling.

Twentyman died in Southport on 16 February 2004, aged 74.
