= Jimmy Melia =

English footballer (born 1937)

Personal information
- Full name: James Melia
- Date of birth: 1 November 1937 (age 88)
- Place of birth: Liverpool, England
- Height: 5 ft 7 in (1.70 m)
- Position: Midfielder

Youth career
- 1952–1954: Liverpool

Senior career*
Years	Team	Apps	(Gls)
1954–1964	Liverpool	269	(76)
1964	Wolverhampton Wanderers	24	(4)
1964–1968	Southampton	139	(11)
1968–1972	Aldershot	135	(14)
1972	Crewe Alexandra	4	(0)
Total		571	(105)

International career
1963	England	2	(1)

Managerial career
- 1969–1972: Aldershot
- 1972–1974: Crewe Alexandra
- 1975: Southport
- 1979: Cleveland Cobras
- 1982–1983: Brighton & Hove Albion
- 1983–1986: C.F. Os Belenenses
- 1986: Stockport County
- * Club domestic league appearances and goals

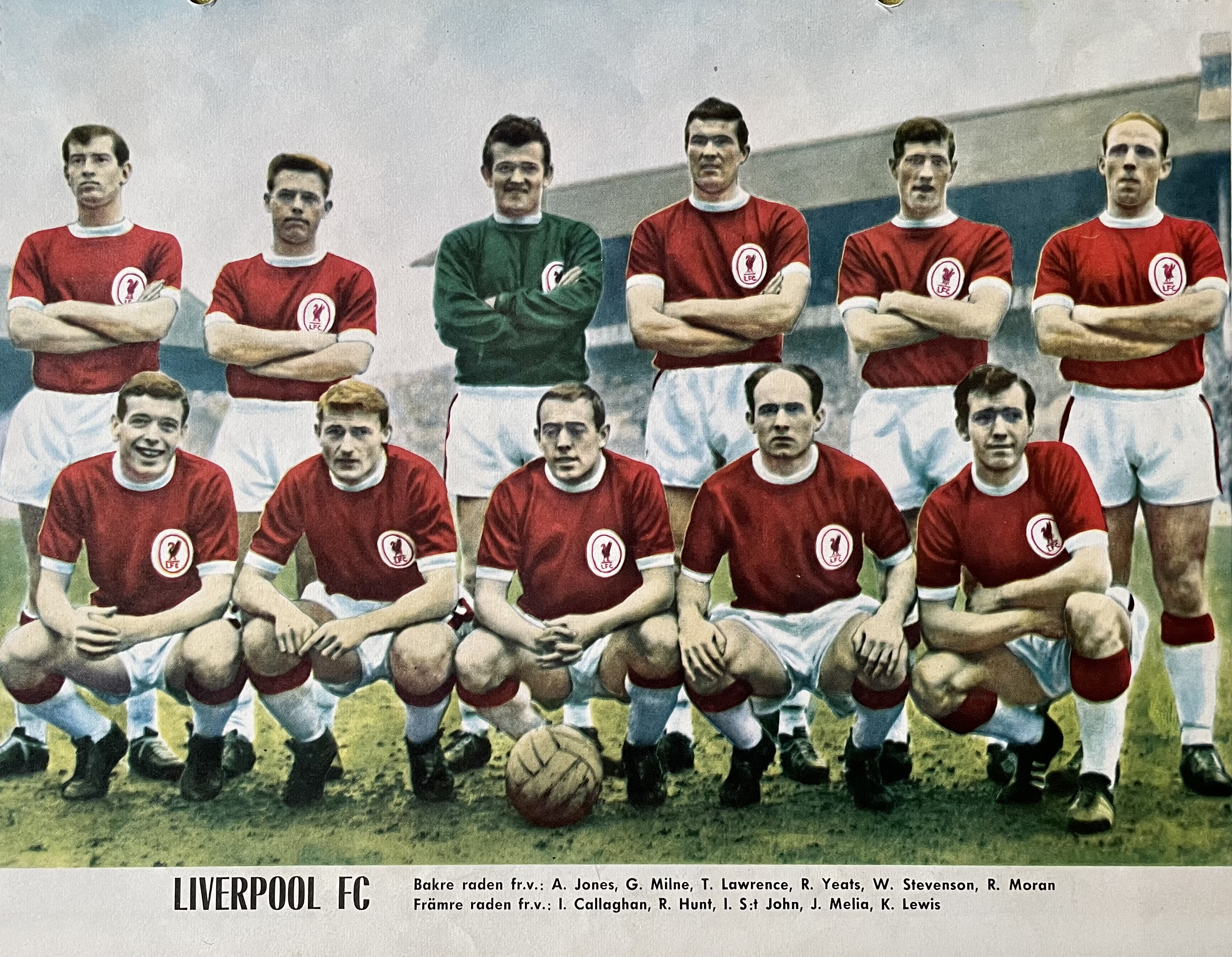
Liverpool F.C. at 1963 with following players, from left standing: Allan Jones, Gordon Milne, Tommy Lawrence, Ron Yeats (captain), Willie Stevenson, Ronnie Moran; front row: Ian Callaghan, Roger Hunt, Ian St John, Jimmy Melia and Kevin Lewis.

James Melia (born 1 November 1937) is an English former professional footballer who spent most of his career playing for Liverpool and went on to become a manager.

== Playing career ==
=== Liverpool ===
Melia joined the Reds straight from St. Anthony's School as a 15-year-old, when manager Don Welsh saw the potential in the young schoolboy international's feet. Melia signed professional forms on his 17th birthday, 1 November 1954. After 23 appearances for Liverpool's reserve team, Melia made his début aged 18 on 17 December 1955 at Anfield in a 2nd Division fixture against Nottingham Forest. The visitors came up against an in-form Billy Liddell who scored a hat-trick in the 5–2 victory. Melia also scored his first goal for the club in the 48th minute, John Evans got the other.

The following season that he got a run in the side starting 27 matches. Melia followed this up with a 36-match season scoring 10 goals.

Melia did well in the first Division and played 39 times as Liverpool finished in eighth place. Unfortunately for the red half of Merseyside Everton won the league and were 17 points better.

During this spell Melia caught the eye of England manager Alf Ramsey who gave him his debut on 6 April 1963 in the 2–1 British Championship loss at Wembley to Scotland. Melia's one and only goal came in his second and final appearance for his country, on 5 June 1963 at St. Jakob Park, Basel as England beat Switzerland 8–1.

The next season Liverpool won the championship by four points from Manchester United. Melia, now aged 27, could add a championship medal to the second division title medal he already owned. By this time, however, he had joined Wolves, moving in March 1964 for a club record transfer fee of £48,000, but had played enough games for Liverpool to get the medal.

=== Wolverhampton Wanderers ===
His stay in the Midlands was a short one. While he had a good run in the first team, this came to an abrupt end when manager Stan Cullis was sacked and replaced by Andy Beattie. Beattie decided that Melia was not the type of player he wanted and quickly offloaded him to Southampton.

=== Southampton ===
In December 1964, Melia was signed for a fee of £30,000 by Southampton's manager Ted Bates "who was keen to acquire his scheming visionary skills". Melia was reluctant to move to the south coast, but when he was eventually persuaded, "Saints' (then) record signing added finesse" to the midfield. Although Saints missed out on promotion at the end of the 1964–65 season, Melia linked up well with Terry Paine and Martin Chivers in the following season, helping them to promotion from Division 2, finishing five points behind champions Manchester City.

He remained an ever-present for Southampton in their first season in Division 1, as they narrowly hung on to their place in the top flight, with Melia's crosses helping Ron Davies and Chivers score 37 and 14 goals respectively, adding four for himself, the best being a header in a 2–1 victory over Arsenal on 27 December 1966.

He continued to make a valuable contribution to the team but lost his place to Mick Channon and in November 1968 he moved on to Aldershot for a £10,000 fee and the player manager's job.

In his four years at The Dell he made a total of 152 appearances, scoring 12 goals.

== Management career ==
=== Aldershot and Crewe Alexandra ===
Melia joined Aldershot as player-coach in November 1968, taking the management position in April 1969. Melia moved on from Aldershot in February 1972 to take up a similar role at Crewe Alexandra; after retiring as a player in May 1972, he took on the managerial role at Gresty Road full-time. While at Aldershot, Melia gained a reputation for his hard-hitting and occasionally controversial column in the club's match day programme.

=== United States ===
Melia moved to the United States of America as an assistant to Laurie Calloway with the Southern California Lazers in 1978 and became head coach of the Cleveland Cobras in 1979.

=== Brighton & Hove Albion ===
Melia became Brighton & Hove Albion's chief scout. When Mike Bailey left as manager in December 1982, Melia was promoted to jointly manage Albion with reserve team manager George Aitken. They shared the duties for three months with Aitken taking more of a background role. His greatest managerial feat occurred when he took Albion to the 1983 FA Cup Final. The run took Melia back to his old stomping ground of Anfield where a goal from another ex-Liverpool player Jimmy Case won the game. During the cup run Melia became famous for his 'disco' style of dress and his glamorous younger girlfriend, Val Lloyd. Melia was appointed permanently as manager in March 1983 after Albion reached the FA Cup semi-final for the first time, beating Norwich City. They beat Sheffield Wednesday in the semi-final to face Manchester United in the final. Brighton drew the final, and then lost the replay. That season they were also relegated from the First Division, finishing bottom, ending their four-year spell in the top division. During the summer, former Albion player Chris Cattlin was appointed as first-team coach by chairman Mike Bamber in an attempt to instil discipline into the side. Melia resigned his post on 19 October 1983, reportedly due to his disdain of backroom meddling by Cattlin, who had started to have an influence on team selection. The following home game, Melia attended as a supporter in the North Terrace and was lifted onto the shoulders of fans with the fans chanting "Melia In, Bamber Out". Albion had won just 7 out of 35 League games with him in charge.

=== After Brighton ===
Melia went on to take charge of Portuguese side Belenenses, helping them get promoted to the Primeira Liga. In 1986, he was appointed as manager of Stockport County.

In 1989 he had a stint in youth training when he travelled to Sharjah in the United Arab Emirates where he set up an academy. He currently coaches youth teams for Liverpool FC America in The Colony, Texas, after joining them in 2008.

== Honours ==
=== As a player ===
Liverpool

- Football League First Division: 1963–64
- Football League Second Division: 1961–62

Southampton

- Football League Second Division runner-up: 1965–66

=== As a manager ===
Brighton & Hove Albion

- FA Cup runner-up: 1982–83
