= Johnny Wheeler =

English footballer (1928–2019)

Personal information
- Full name: John Edward Wheeler
- Date of birth: 26 July 1928
- Place of birth: Crosby, Lancashire, England,
- Date of death: 15 November 2019 (aged 91)
- Position: Wing half

Youth career
- Carlton

Senior career*
Years	Team	Apps	(Gls)
1946–1951	Tranmere Rovers	101	(9)
1951–1956	Bolton Wanderers	189	(18)
1956–1963	Liverpool	164	(23)
1963	New Brighton		
Total		454	(50)

International career
	England B	4	(0)
1954	England	1	(0)
- * Club domestic league appearances and goals

John Edward Wheeler (26 July 1928 – 15 November 2019) was an English professional footballer. He played for Tranmere Rovers, Bolton Wanderers, Liverpool and New Brighton.

== Club career ==
Wheeler played club football for Carlton, Tranmere Rovers, Bolton Wanderers, Liverpool and New Brighton.

Wheeler played for Bolton Wanderers in the 1953 FA Cup final at Wembley on 2 May 1953 in which Bolton lost 4–3 to Blackpool.

== International career ==
He gained his only England cap in 1954 when Walter Winterbottom selected him to play in a British Home Championship match against Northern Ireland at Windsor Park, Belfast. Goals from Johnny Haynes and Don Revie gained England a 2–0 win.

== Coaching career ==
Following his retirement from being a player in 1963, Wheeler went on to become assistant trainer at Bury.

== Later life and death ==
Wheeler died in November 2019, aged 91.

== Honours ==
Bolton Wanderers

- FA Cup runner-up: 1952–53
