= Alan A'Court =

English footballer (1934–2009)

Personal information
- Full name: Alan A'Court
- Date of birth: 30 September 1934
- Place of birth: Rainhill, England
- Date of death: 14 December 2009 (aged 75)
- Place of death: Nantwich, England
- Position: Winger

Youth career
- –1952: Prescot Cables

Senior career*
Years	Team	Apps	(Gls)
1952–1964	Liverpool	354	(61)
1964–1966	Tranmere Rovers	50	(11)
1966–1967	Norwich City	0	(0)
Total		404	(72)

International career
1957–1958	England	5	(1)

Managerial career
- 1978: Stoke City (caretaker)
- 1983–1984: Nantwich Town
- * Club domestic league appearances and goals

Alan A'Court (30 September 1934 – 14 December 2009) was an English professional footballer who mostly played for Liverpool. He gained five caps for England and represented the nation at the 1958 FIFA World Cup.

== Playing career ==
Born in Rainhill, Lancashire, England, A'Court was a winger who started out at Prescot Cables as an amateur before he was signed by Reds manager Don Welsh. A'Court made his debut in a league match at Ayresome Park on 7 February 1953, a game that saw Liverpool take both the points from a 3–2 win. His first goal came a month later on 14 March, again in a league match, this time at Anfield in a 2–0 victory over Sunderland.

A'Court, who followed Rugby league, signed from Prescot as an 18-year-old in September 1952, spurning the advances of Everton and Bolton Wanderers to become an Anfield apprentice, a decision that paid off as just six months after joining he made his first team debut. The following season A'Court played 16 times, as Liverpool were relegated to the Second Division.

During the Anfield club's first season in the second tier of English football A'Court established himself as a first team regular making 33 league and cup appearances. A'Court remained consistent as Liverpool failed to regain their top flight status. By the age of 24 years and 89 days he had played 200 league games for the Reds becoming the youngest player to do so, a record that still stands.

Although the strong and talented A'Court could have left to play for teams in the First Division, his loyalty to Liverpool was rewarded in 1961–62 when, as an ever-present, he and the Reds celebrated promotion back to the First Division under the guidance of Bill Shankly, finishing a full eight points (in the days of two points for a win) clear of second placed Leyton Orient. A'Court was selected 23 times during Liverpool's first season back amongst football's elite teams; he helped Liverpool to an eighth-place finish in the First Division.

Whilst still in Division 2 A'Court's skill alerted England manager Walter Winterbottom, who was looking for a player to replace an injured Tom Finney; Winterbottom handed the left winger the first of his five caps on 6 November 1957 in a British Championship match against Northern Ireland at Wembley. A'Court's only goal for his country and a goal for Duncan Edwards were not enough to prevent England losing the game 3–2. The highlight of his career was representing England at the 1958 FIFA World Cup in Sweden, where he played in England's last three matches against Brazil (0–0), Austria (2–2), and the group stage play-off game against the USSR (0–1). He did this despite playing for a club in the Second Division.

Unfortunately for A'Court, injuries began to take their toll. He missed the whole of the 1963–64 championship winning season, so Shankly signed Peter Thompson from Preston North End. After spending most of his career at Liverpool, playing 382 times and scoring 63 goals, A'Court was allowed to leave. He joined Tranmere Rovers for a fee of £4,500 in October 1964. A'Court's final outing in a Red shirt was in a historic match: Liverpool's first ever European match at Anfield, the game was a European Cup preliminary round 2nd leg match on 14 September 1964. Liverpool had won the first encounter with Icelandic side KR 5–0 but rather than treat the return leg as a mere formality, the Reds finished off the job with a comprehensive 6–1 victory.

== Coaching career ==
A'Court later became player-coach at Norwich City before taking on various coaching jobs, including posts in Zambia and New Zealand, he also became assistant manager at Stoke City when Tony Waddington called upon his services in 1969. In January 1978 George Eastham was sacked and A'Court was put in caretaker charge. His only match in charge of Stoke came in the FA Cup at home to non-league Blyth Spartans in 1977–78, Stoke lost the match 3–2.

Once new manager Alan Durban was appointed A'Court moved to Crewe Alexandra as an assistant manager. He then went to join the sport staff at North Staffordshire Polytechnic. He managed Nantwich Town from September 1983 to April 1984.

== Post-retirement ==
After finally retiring from football, A'Court ran a tobacconist/newsagent shop on the borders of Birkenhead and Bebington. A'Court died of cancer on 14 December 2009.

== Career statistics ==
=== Club ===
Appearances and goals by club, season and competition
Club	Season	League			FA Cup		League Cup		Europe		Total	
Club	Season	Division	Apps	Goals	Apps	Goals	Apps	Goals	Apps	Goals	Apps	Goals
Liverpool	1952–53	First Division	12	2	0	0	0	0	–		12	0
Liverpool	1953–54	First Division	16	3	0	0	0	0	–		16	3
Liverpool	1954–55	Second Division	30	2	3	1	0	0	–		33	3
Liverpool	1955–56	Second Division	40	6	5	0	0	0	–		45	6
Liverpool	1956–57	Second Division	38	10	1	0	0	0	–		39	10
Liverpool	1957–58	Second Division	39	6	5	0	0	0	–		44	6
Liverpool	1958–59	Second Division	39	7	1	0	0	0	–		40	7
Liverpool	1959–60	Second Division	42	8	2	0	0	0	–		44	8
Liverpool	1960–61	Second Division	33	7	2	0	2	0	–		37	7
Liverpool	1961–62	Second Division	42	8	5	1	0	0	–		47	9
Liverpool	1962–63	First Division	23	2	0	0	0	0	–		23	2
Liverpool	1963–64	First Division	0	0	0	0	0	0	–		0	0
Liverpool	1964–65	First Division	0	0	0	0	0	0	1	0	1	0
Liverpool	Total		354	61	6	2	2	0	1	0	363	63
Tranmere Rovers	1964–65	Fourth Division	24	4	2	0	0	0	–		26	4
Tranmere Rovers	1965–66	Fourth Division	26	7	1	0	1	0	–		28	7
Tranmere Rovers	Total		50	11	3	0	1	0	0	0	54	11
Career total			404	72	27	2	3	0	1	0	435	74

=== International ===
Appearances and goals by national team and year
National team	Year	Apps	Goals
England	1957	1	1
England	1958	4	0
Total		5	1

Scores and results list England's goal tally first.
Score and result list England's goal tally first, score column indicates score after A'Court's goal.

International goal scored by Alan A'Court
No.	Date	Venue	Opponent	Score	Result	Competition
1	6 November 1957	Wembley Stadium, London	Northern Ireland	1–1	2–3	1958 British Home Championship

== Managerial statistics ==
Managerial record by club and tenure
Team	From	To	Record				
Team	From	To	P	W	D	L	Win %
Stoke City	9 January 1978	13 February 1978	1	0	0	1	0.0
Total			1	0	0	1	0.0
