= Alan Arnell =

English footballer

Personal information
- Date of birth: 25 November 1933
- Place of birth: Chichester, England
- Date of death: 5 May 2013 (aged 79)
- Position: Striker

Senior career*
| Years | Team | Apps | (Gls) |
- Worthing
| 1953–1961 | Liverpool | 56 | (33) |
| | Tranmere Rovers | 68 | (34) |
| | Halifax Town | 14 | (6) |
- Runcorn
- * Club domestic league appearances and goals

Alan Arnell (25 November 1933 – 5 May 2013) was an English footballer who played as a centre forward in the 1950s and 1960s. He played for Liverpool, Tranmere Rovers and Halifax Town.

== Playing career ==
Arnell was born in Chichester and started out as an amateur player for Worthing before joining Liverpool in March 1953. He turned professional the following year.

Arnell made a scoring debut for Liverpool at centre forward in a 5–2 win against Blackpool in December 1953. After 35 goals in 75 appearances for Liverpool, he moved to Tranmere Rovers in February 1961.

At Tranmere, he scored 34 times in 68 League games, and he later played for Halifax Town and Runcorn.

== Death ==
Arnell died on 5 May 2013, aged 79.
