= Doug Rudham =

South African soccer player

Personal information
- Full name: Keith Robert Rudham
- Date of birth: 3 May 1926
- Place of birth: Johannesburg, South Africa
- Date of death: 13 August 1991 (aged 65)
- Place of death: Johannesburg, South Africa
- Position: Goalkeeper

Senior career*
Years	Team	Apps	(Gls)
1945–1951	Marist Brothers		
1952–1954	Germiston Callies		
1954	Johannesburg Rangers		
1954–1960	Liverpool	63	(0)
1960–1962	Johannesburg Ramblers	44	(0)
1963–1965	Johannesburg Wanderers	3	(0)
1966–1967	Jewish Guild	?	(0)

International career
1953	South Africa	1	(0)
- * Club domestic league appearances and goals

Doug Rudham (3 May 1926 – 13 August 1991) was a South African footballer who played as a goalkeeper for Liverpool F.C. in The Football League. Rudham signed for Liverpool after impressing their staff while he was on tour in England with the South African national team. Rudham became first-choice goalkeeper during the 1954–55 season, despite conceding nine goals in a defeat to Birmingham City F.C. The next seasons saw Rudham lose his place in the Liverpool goal following the arrival of Tommy Younger from Hibernian F.C. He made only six appearances during his next three seasons at the club and left in May 1960.
