= Ronnie Moran =

English footballer (1934–2017)

Personal information
- Full name: Ronald Moran
- Date of birth: 28 February 1934
- Place of birth: Liverpool, England
- Date of death: 22 March 2017 (aged 83)
- Position: Left-back

Youth career
- Liverpool

Senior career*
Years	Team	Apps	(Gls)
1952–1968	Liverpool	343	(16)

Managerial career
- 1991: Liverpool (caretaker)
- 1992: Liverpool (caretaker)
- * Club domestic league appearances and goals

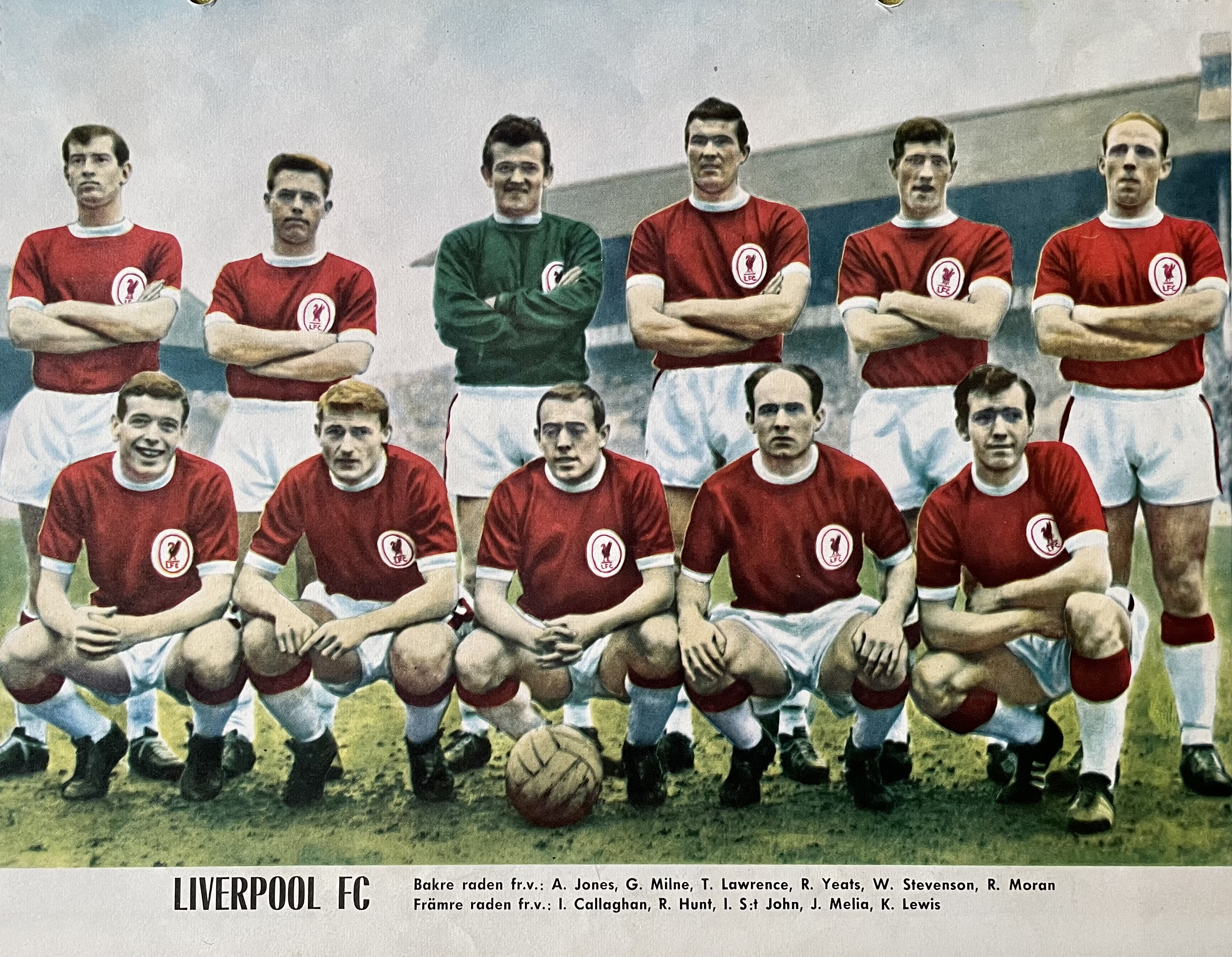
Liverpool F.C. at 1963 with following players, from left standing: Allan Jones, Gordon Milne, Tommy Lawrence, Ron Yeats (captain), Willie Stevenson, Ronnie Moran; front row: Ian Callaghan, Roger Hunt, Ian St John, Jimmy Melia and Kevin Lewis.

Ronald Moran (28 February 1934 – 22 March 2017) was an English footballer who played as a left-back for Liverpool, also captaining the side. He later twice served as caretaker manager for Liverpool in the early 1990s.

Having spent his entire playing career at the club, he then became a member of the Boot Room coaching staff with Bill Shankly, Bob Paisley, Joe Fagan and Reuben Bennett, and was the club's longest-serving employee when he retired in 1998.

== Playing career ==
Moran was born in Crosby, Liverpool, and began his footballing career at Liverpool playing with the 'C' team while working as an apprentice electrician. Originally a left-back, Moran signed professional terms for manager Don Welsh in January 1952 and subsequently made his debut in a 3–2 defeat at Derby County on 22 November 1952, at the age of 18 years.

It was in season 1955–56 that Moran established himself as Liverpool's first choice number three. The Reds were languishing in the Second Division at this time but Moran, a good marker who was rarely beaten by a winger for pace and was also something of a penalty expert, proved himself a consistent performer missing only six games between 1955 and 1959.

He was rewarded for his service towards the latter part of the decade when he was handed the club captaincy. In 1961–62, after a lengthy spell on the sidelines, he played sixteen games as the Reds finally regained their top-flight status and two seasons later was part of the Division One Championship-winning side, missing only seven games all season.

Injury problems then began to set in and he missed out to Gerry Byrne for the left-back slot in the 1965 FA Cup Final win over Leeds United. He did, however, play in the Anfield victory over Internazionale three days later, before playing his last competitive game in the San Siro stadium when Liverpool were controversially beaten in the second leg of the European Cup semi-final.

== Coaching career ==
Moran formally retired from playing during the 1968–69 season and joined the coaching staff full-time, where he joined the Boot Room team of Shankly, Fagan, Bob Paisley and Reuben Bennett.

In 1971, he took charge of the reserve team and in 1972–73 guided the Reds' second string to the Central League Championship.

Moran, known as ''Bugsy'', was a long-serving member of Liverpool's coaching staff during one of the club's most successful periods. He worked under Bill Shankly, Bob Paisley, Joe Fagan and Kenny Dalglish, and later under Graeme Souness and Roy Evans.

In keeping with the Boot Room traditions he never sought the limelight, never promoted himself above his colleagues or the team. He became famous on the bench for his loud voice shouting instructions to the players which could be heard in the packed Kop.

When Dalglish sensationally announced his resignation as manager in February 1991, Moran was installed as caretaker boss, a role he occupied for only ten games. His first game in charge was a 3–1 defeat away to Luton Town on 23 February 1991. He had placed on record an unwillingness to take the job on full-time and summarily stood down when Graeme Souness was duly appointed as Dalglish's successor in April 1991.

In April 1992 Moran took over as caretaker again after Graeme Souness went in for heart surgery. Souness's first game back was the 1992 FA Cup Final where he chose the team along with Moran. Moran had the honour of leading Liverpool out at Wembley for The Final. Souness returned to his full-time duties in July.

Moran remained on the coaching staff under Souness and then under friend Roy Evans when he took over as manager in January 1994. Evans became the ninth manager Moran had worked under at the club in one capacity or another in his near half century of dedicated service, the full list being: George Kay, Don Welsh, Phil Taylor, Bill Shankly, Bob Paisley, Joe Fagan, Kenny Dalglish, Graeme Souness, Roy Evans.

Ronnie Moran finally announced his retirement from football and left Liverpool in 1998. Along with Bob Paisley, he had filled every role imaginable at the club from player, to physio, to coach and trainer, through to manager, and kit man.

In March 2017, a book titled Mr Liverpool was released which detailed Moran's life at Liverpool FC.

Moran died on 22 March 2017, at the age of 83.

== Honours ==
=== Player ===
Liverpool

- Football League First Division: 1963–64
- Football League Second Division: 1961–62
- FA Charity Shield: 1964

=== Manager ===
Liverpool

- FA Cup: 1991–92
