= Louis Bimpson =

English footballer (1929–2021)

Personal information
- Full name: James Louis Bimpson
- Date of birth: 14 May 1929
- Place of birth: Rainford, England
- Date of death: 13 November 2021 (aged 92)
- Position: Striker

Senior career*
Years	Team	Apps	(Gls)
1951–1953	Burscough		
1953–1959	Liverpool	93	(39)
1959–1961	Blackburn Rovers	22	(5)
1961	Bournemouth & Boscombe Athletic	11	(1)
1961–1963	Rochdale	54	(16)
1963–1964	Wigan Athletic	5	(2)
- * Club domestic league appearances and goals

James Louis Bimpson (14 May 1929 – 13 November 2021) was an English footballer who played as a striker for Liverpool during the 1950s.

== Life and playing career ==
Born in Rainford, Lancashire (now in Merseyside) in May 1929, Bimpson played for Burscough before Liverpool signed him in 1953. He played 102 games for Liverpool, scoring 39 goals, and was the club's top scorer in the 1953–54 season.

He joined Blackburn Rovers in 1959. Although not a first team regular, he played in every round of the 1959–60 FA Cup, and was part of the team that were defeated in the final against Wolverhampton Wanderers.

Bimpson had a brief spell with Bournemouth & Boscombe Athletic in 1961 before joining Rochdale. He helped Rochdale reach the final of the 1961–62 Football League Cup, which they lost to Norwich City. He later dropped into non-league football with Wigan Athletic in 1963, where he scored twice in five Cheshire League games.

Bimpson died on 13 November 2021, at the age of 92.

== Honours ==
Blackburn Rovers

- FA Cup runner-up: 1959–60

Rochdale

- Football League Cup runner-up: 1961–62
