= Dick White (footballer) =

English footballer (1931–2002)

Dick White (18 August 1931 – 15 June 2002) was an English professional footballer. He played for Liverpool, Scunthorpe Sports Club (amateur), Brumby amateurs, Scunthorpe United, Doncaster Rovers, Kettering Town (amateur).
