= Don Welsh =

English footballer and manager (1911–1990)

Personal information
- Full name: Donald Welsh
- Date of birth: 25 February 1911
- Place of birth: Manchester, England
- Date of death: 2 February 1990 (aged 78)
- Place of death: England
- Height: 6 ft 0 in (1.83 m)
- Position: Inside forward

Senior career*
Years	Team	Apps	(Gls)
- Torquay United
1935–1947	Charlton Athletic	199	(44)

International career
1938–1939	England	3	(1)

Managerial career
- 1947–1951: Brighton & Hove Albion
- 1951–1956: Liverpool
- 1958–1961: Bournemouth & Boscombe Athletic
- 1962–1964: Wycombe Wanderers
- * Club domestic league appearances and goals

Donald Welsh (25 February 1911 – 2 February 1990) was an English football player and manager. As a player, he played at inside left for Charlton Athletic and for England, winning the FA Cup with Charlton in 1946–47.

== Playing career ==
Welsh joined Charlton Athletic in 1935, costing a fee of £3,250 from Torquay United. An extremely versatile player, he could play equally well at inside left, centre forward, centre half or left half. He soon became captain and skippered Charlton to consecutive promotions from the Third Division to the First Division. In 1938, he gained the first of three caps for England against Germany. He later played for the national team against Switzerland and Romania, scoring once against the latter in 1939. Welsh did make 8 unofficial war time International Caps for England between 1940 and 1941, scoring a total of 9 goals, of which he scored all four goals in an impressive 4–0 victory against Wales in 1940.

During the Second World War he made guest appearances for Charlton and Liverpool. He scored 100 goals in 119 League games for Charlton and 43 goals in 40 games for Liverpool. Welsh also led Charlton to two War Cup finals in 1943 and 1944, winning in 1944 by beating Chelsea. He also made nine appearances for England in the semi-official wartime matches, scoring twelve goals.

He returned to play for Charlton at the end of the war. He captained the side to FA Cup finals in 1946 and 1947, winning the latter game against Burnley. He left the club in November 1947 to begin his management career.

== Management career ==
With his playing days over, Welsh started his managerial career at Brighton & Hove Albion in November 1947 aged 36 years old. His managerial career did not start well – Brighton finished bottom of the Third Division (South) at the end of the 1947–48 season. Brighton recovered to finish 6th and 8th in the next two years. Following this he joined Liverpool as manager on 5 March 1951 as a result of George Kay's decision to step down through ill-health.

In 1954 Welsh became the first manager to guide Liverpool into relegation for over 50 years. That day also saw Everton promoted back to the First Division. He had almost accomplished that feat the season before finishing 17th, and only a scrappy win over Chelsea on the last day of the season kept Liverpool up. After this relegation Liverpool would stay in the Second Division for eight more seasons. Liverpool came near to being promoted again in 1955–56, but Welsh would not be given another chance and was sacked as Liverpool manager in 1956. According to some who played under him, Welsh had an eccentric style.

After leaving Liverpool, Welsh became a publican for a while in the West Country before the lure of football brought him back into club management again, this time at Bournemouth & Boscombe Athletic in the newly formed and non-regional Third Division just before the start of the 1958–59 season. After two average seasons (they finished 12th and 10th), he was dismissed in February 1961 following a string of poor results. In 1962, he worked for the London County Council Education Department as a Football Coach/Teacher at Tollington Park School in North London. He left the LCC to manage non-League Wycombe Wanderers between July 1962 and December 1964 before returning to the club where he had enjoyed such success as a player, Charlton Athletic, to become a member of their administrative staff. He died in 1990, aged 78. In 2013, he was inducted into the Charlton Athletic Hall of Fame.

== Honours ==
=== As a player ===
Charlton Athletic

- FA Cup: 1946–47; runner-up: 1945–46
