= 1955–56 Middlesbrough F.C. season =

Middlesbrough
1955–56 season
- Chairman: Eric Thomas
- Manager: Bob Dennison
- Stadium: Ayresome Park
- Division Two: 14th
- FA Cup: Fourth Round
- Top goalscorer: League: Lindy Delapenha (14); All: Delapenha (21)
Home colours	Away colours

The 1955–56 season was Middlesbrough's 73rd year in existence and 2nd consecutive season in the Division Two. Also the club competed in the FA Cup.

== Summary ==
In his second season as manager Bob Dennison avoided the relegation and reached the FA Cup 4th round. The season is best remembered by the debuts of Forwards Brian Clough and Alan Peacock after a good performance over the reserves. Meanwhile, veteran Jamaican Striker Lindy Delapenha repeated as top club scorer with 18 goals.

== Squad ==
Note: Flags indicate national team as defined under FIFA eligibility rules; some limited exceptions apply. Players may hold more than one non-FIFA nationality.

Pos.	Nation	Player
GK	ITA	Rolando Ugolini
GK	ENG	Peter Taylor
DF	ENG	Derek Stonehouse
DF	ENG	Ray Barnard
DF	ENG	Dicky Robinson
DF	ENG	Ray Bilcliff
DF	ENG	Brian Phillips
DF	ENG	Bobby Corbett
MF	ENG	Ronnie Dicks
MF	WAL	Bill Harris
MF	ENG	Bert Mitchell
MF	SCO	Sam Lawrie

Pos.	Nation	Player
MF	ENG	Joe Birbeck
MF	ENG	Frank Mulholland
MF	ENG	Peter Stephenson
FW	ENG	Billy Day
FW	ENG	Joe Scott
FW	ENG	Charlie Wayman
FW	ENG	Brian Clough
FW	ENG	Alan Peacock
FW	ENG	Derek McLean
FW	ENG	Ken McPherson
FW	ENG	Doug Cooper
FW	IRL	Arthur Fitzsimons
FW	JAM	Lindy Delapenha

== Results ==
=== Second Division ===
==== League table ====
Pos	Team	Pld	W	D	L	GF	GA	GAv	Pts
12	Port Vale	42	16	13	13	60	58	1.034	45
13	Stoke City	42	20	4	18	71	62	1.145	44
14	Middlesbrough	42	16	8	18	76	78	0.974	40
15	Bury	42	16	8	18	86	90	0.956	40
16	West Ham United	42	14	11	17	74	69	1.072	39

Rules for classification: 1) Points; 2) Goal average; 3) Goals scored

==== Results by round ====
Round	1	2	3	4	5	6	7	8	9	10	11	12	13	14	15	16	17	18	19	20	21	22	23	24	25	26	27	28	29	30	31	32	33	34	35	36	37	38	39	40	41	42
Ground	H	A	A	H	H	A	H	A	A	H	A	H	A	H	A	H	A	H	A	A	H	H	A	A	H	H	A	H	H	A	H	A	H	A	H	A	H	A	H	H	A	A
Result	W	L	L	W	D	D	D	D	L	W	W	L	D	W	L	W	L	W	L	L	W	W	L	L	D	L	W	L	W	W	L	W	D	D	L	L	L	L	W	W	L	W
Position	1	9	15	9	11	13	13	14	15	15	14	15	15	12	13	12	13	13	16	17	16	14	15	17	15	16	14	14	14	14	14	14	14	15	15	15	16	17	16	15	16	14

Source: https://www.11v11.com/teams/middlesbrough/tab/matches/season/1956/
A = Away; H = Home; W = Win; D = Draw; L = Loss; = Champions, Promoted to 1956-57 Division One; = Promoted to 1956–57 Division One; = Relegated to 1956–57 Division Three

==== Matches ====
- .- Source: https://www.11v11.com/teams/middlesbrough/tab/matches/season/1956/

20 August 1955 1	Middlesbrough	3–0	Notts County	Middlesbrough
	Fitzsimons 33', 58'; Delapenha 38'	1		Stadium: Ayresome Park; Attendance: 20,291; Referee: RP Hartley

25 August 1955 2	Swansea Town	2–1	Middlesbrough	Swansea
	Jones 77' (pen.); Medwin 84'	9	20' Wayman	Stadium: Vetch Field; Attendance: 21,351; Referee: W Hickson

27 August 1955 3	Leeds United	2–0	Middlesbrough	Leeds
	Nightingale 18'; Brook 69'	15		Stadium: Elland Road; Attendance: 22,535; Referee: PF Power

31 August 1955 4	Middlesbrough	4–1	Swansea Town	Middlesbrough
	Fitzsimons 30', 78'; McPherson 68', 82'	9	88' Ivor J Allchurch	Stadium: Ayresome Park; Attendance: 22,417; Referee: W Hickson

3 September 1955 5	Middlesbrough	1–1	Fulham	Middlesbrough
	Delapenha 62' (pen.)	11	66' Mitten	Stadium: Ayresome Park; Attendance: 26,275; Referee: JH Clough

10 September 1955 6	Bury	1–1	Middlesbrough	Bury
	Robinson 64'	13	81' McPherson	Stadium: Gigg Lane; Attendance: 12,278; Referee: ES Oxley

17 September 1955 7	Middlesbrough	1–1	Barnsley F.C.	Middlesbrough
	Fitzsimons 83'	13	56' Bobby Brown	Stadium: Ayresome Park; Attendance: 24,960; Referee: JS Swain
Note: Brian Clough`s League debut, after scoring 15 goals in 9 reserve games.

24 September 1955 8	Liverpool	1–1	Middlesbrough	Liverpool
	Liddell 2'	14	44' Scott	Stadium: Anfield; Attendance: 35,213; Referee: L Richardson

1 October 1955 9	Bristol City	2–0	Middlesbrough	Bristol
	Atyeo 1'; Rodgers 60'	15		Stadium: Ashton Gate; Attendance: 28,788; Referee: KA Collinge

8 October 1955 10	Middlesbrough	4–3	Leicester City	Middlesbrough
	Clough 39'; Fitzsimons 41'; Delapenha 44' (pen.); Harris 76'	15	5' Rowley; 21', 77' Gardiner	Stadium: Ayresome Park; Attendance: 20,642; Referee: F Collinge

15 October 1955 11	Lincoln City	1–2	Middlesbrough	Lincoln
	Troops 55'	14	40' Delapenha; 75' Clough	Stadium: Sincil Bank; Attendance: 12,532; Referee: H Webb

22 October 1955 12	Middlesbrough	1–3	Stoke City	Middlesbrough
	Delapenha 48'	15	51' King; 81', 88' Oscroft	Stadium: Ayresome Park; Attendance: 22,394; Referee: WJ Gaiger

29 October 1955 13	Hull City	2–2	Middlesbrough	Kingston-upon-Hull
	Atkinson 13'; Davidson 40'	15	24'Fitzsimons; 80' Day	Stadium: Boothferry Park; Attendance: 14,013; Referee: T Seymour

5 November 1955 16	Middlesbrough	3–2	Nottingham Forest	Middlesbrough
	Wayman 35'; Lawrie 79'; McPherson 87'	12	50' Imlach; 70' Barrett	Stadium: Ayresome Park; Attendance: 17,573; Referee: JS Swain

12 November 1955 17	Sheffield Wednesday	3–1	Middlesbrough	Sheffield
	Shiner 14'; Wilkinson 20'; Gibson 37'	13	60' Fitzsimons	Stadium: Hillsborough; Attendance: 24,030; Referee: FH Gerrard

19 November 1955 18	Middlesbrough	4–1	Doncaster Rovers	Middlesbrough
	Wayman 7'; Fitzsimons 19', 73'; Scott 69'	12	10' Mooney	Stadium: Ayresome Park; Attendance: 15,360; Referee: L Howarth

26 November 1955 19	Bristol Rovers	7–2	Middlesbrough	Bristol
	Bradford 13', 64'; Ward 15', 18'; Hooper 67', 77'; Petherbridge 82'	13	40' Wayman; 80' Delapenha	Stadium: Eastville Stadium; Attendance: 23,716; Referee: JS McLoughlin
Note: Forward Alan Peacock debut on Division Two.

3 December 1955 20	Middlesbrough	1–0	Blackburn Rovers	Middlesbrough
	Delapenha 76' (pen.)	13		Stadium: Ayresome Park; Attendance: 16,827; Referee: G McCabe

10 December 1955 21	Plymouth Argyle	4–0	Middlesbrough	Plymouth
	Wetton 11'; Davis 51'; Robinson 73' (o.g.); Arthur Stenner 76'	16		Stadium: Home Park; Attendance: 12,651; Referee: A Bond

17 December 1955 22	Notts County	5–0	Middlesbrough	Nottingham
	Roby 10', 14'; Jimmy Jackson 75'; Bobby Crookes 85'; Taylor 86'	17		Stadium: Meadow Lane; Attendance: 9,693; Referee: RP Hartley

24 December 1955 23	Middlesbrough	5–3	Leeds United	Middlesbrough
	Wayman 6', 44'; Delapenha 7', 78'; Joe Scott 85'	16	38' Hutchinson; 41' John Charles; 52' Peter Vickers	Stadium: Ayresome Park; Attendance: 19,416; Referee: PF Power

26 December 1955 24	Middlesbrough	2–0	West Ham United	Middlesbrough
	Mitchell 56'; Wayman 88'	14		Stadium: Ayresome Park; Attendance: 22,001; Referee: TL Wood

27 December 1955 25	West Ham Utd	1–0	Middlesbrough	Upton Park
	Bilcliff 27' (o.g.)	15		Stadium: Boleyn Ground; Attendance: 21,522

31 December 1955 26	Fulham	4–1	Middlesbrough	Fulham
	Jimmy Hill 2'; Trevor 'Tosh' Chamberlain 24'; Bobby Robson 53', 86'	17	58' Wayman	Stadium: Craven Cottage; Attendance: 18,470; Referee: JH Clough

2 January 1956 27	Middlesbrough	1–1	Port Vale	Middlesbrough
	Fitzsimons 9'	15	72' Mullard	Stadium: Ayresome Park; Attendance: 21,664

14 January 1956 28	Middlesbrough	1–3	Bury	Middlesbrough
	Wayman 26'	16	36' Kelly; 49' Pearson; 72' Don May	Stadium: Ayresome Park; Attendance: 8,657; Referee: ES Oxley

21 January 1956 29	Barnsley	0–4	Middlesbrough	Barnsley
		14	Betts 19' (o.g); Wayman 78', 85', 86'	Stadium: Oakwell; Attendance: 15,934; Referee: JS Swain

4 February 1956 30	Middlesbrough	1–2	Liverpool	Middlesbrough
	Delapenha 6'	14	67' Evans; 83' Liddell	Stadium: Ayresome Park; Attendance: 12,171; Referee: L Richardson

11 February 1956 31	Middlesbrough	2–1	Bristol City	Middlesbrough
	Delapenha 6'; Clough 71'	14	22' Atyeo	Stadium: Ayresome Park; Attendance: 15,412; Referee: KA Collinge

3 March 1956 32	Stoke City	2–5	Middlesbrough	Stoke-on-Trent
	Bowyer 28'; Oscroft 89'	14	29' Fitzsimons; 44', 52' Joe Scott; 65' Billy Day; 73' Delapenha	Stadium: Victoria Ground; Attendance: 20,135; Referee: WJ Gaiger

10 March 1956 33	Middlesbrough	1–2	Plymouth Argyle	Middlesbrough
	Delapenha 30' (pen.)	14	20' (pen.) Malcolm Davies; 82' Langman	Stadium: Ayresome Park; Attendance: 17,278; Referee: A Bond

17 March 1956 34	Nottingham Forest	2–4	Middlesbrough	Nottingham
	Peter Small 49'; Lishman 60'	14	26' Billy Day; 41' Peacock; 79' (o.g), 81' McKinlay	Stadium: City Ground; Attendance: 22,918; Referee: JS Swain

24 March 1956 35	Middlesbrough	2–2	Sheffield Wednesday	Middlesbrough
	Joe Scott 12', 52'	14	27'Shiner; 48' Quixall	Stadium: Ayresome Park; Attendance: 19,026; Referee: FH Gerrard

31 March 1956 36	Leicester City	1–1	Middlesbrough	Leicester
	Willie Gardiner 78'	15	35' Fitzsimons	Stadium: Filbert Street; Attendance: 28,450; Referee: F Collinge

2 April 1956 37	Middlesbrough	0–1	Rotherham United	Middlesbrough
		15	88' Peter Johnson	Stadium: Ayresome Park; Attendance: 20,803; Referee: H Haworth

3 April 1956 38	Rotherham United	2–1	Middlesbrough	Rotherham
	Ian Wilson 19', 44' (pen.)	15	6' Billy Day	Stadium: Millmoor; Attendance: 13,032; Referee: L Howarth

7 April 1956 39	Middlesbrough	0–1	Bristol Rovers	Middlesbrough
		16	Ward	Stadium: Ayresome Park; Attendance: 12,536; Referee: JS McLoughlin

14 April 1956 40	Blackburn Rovers	2–1	Middlesbrough	Blackburn
	Williamson 24'; Langton 36' (pen.)	17	85' Billy Day	Stadium: Ewood Park; Attendance: 21,070; Referee: G McCabe

18 April 1956 41	Middlesbrough	4–2	Lincoln City	Middlesbrough
	McLean 5'; Wayman 41'; Delapenha 52', 66'	16	22' Northcott; 83' Neal	Stadium: Ayresome Park; Attendance: 8,298; Referee: H Webb

21 April 1956 42	Middlesbrough	5–1	Hull City	Middlesbrough
	Fitzsimons 30'; Delapenha 31', 54' (pen.); Wayman 58'; Billy Day 84'	15	36' Fraser	Stadium: Ayresome Park; Attendance: 11,190; Referee: T Seymour

28 April 1956 43	Port Vale	3–2	Middlesbrough	Burslem
	Done 11', 70'; Baily 88'	16	34' Wayman; 85' McLean	Stadium: Vale Park; Attendance: 11,781; Referee: RP Hartley

3 May 1956 44	Doncaster Rovers	0–1	Middlesbrough	Doncaster
		14	41' Lawrie	Stadium: Belle Vue; Attendance: 5,670

=== FA Cup ===
==== Third Round ====
7 January 1956	Bradford Park Avenue	0–4	Middlesbrough	Bradford
			29', 82' Joe Scott; 33' Lindy Delapenha; 67' Charlie Wayman	Stadium: Park Avenue; Attendance: 18,524; Referee: J Kelly

==== Fourth Round ====
28 January 1956	Tottenham Hotspur	3–1	Midlesbrough	Tottenham
	Maurice Norman 30'; George Robb 60'; Dave Dunmore 87'		16' Joe Scott	Stadium: White Hart Lane; Attendance: 41,895; Referee: H Haworth

== Statistics ==
=== Squad statistics ===
No.	Pos	Nat	Player	Total		Football League Division Two		FA Cup		Other	
No.	Pos	Nat	Player	Apps	Goals	Apps	Goals	Apps	Goals	Apps	Goals
	GK	(Italy) ITA	Rolando Ugolini	38	0	36	0	2	0	0	0
	DF	(England) ENG	Derek Stonehouse	31	0	30	0	1	0	0	0
	DF	(England) ENG	Ray Barnard	23	0	23	0	0	0	0	0
	DF	(England) ENG	Dicky Robinson	31	0	29	0	2	0	0	0
	MF	(Wales) WAL	Bill Harris	44	1	42	1	2	0	0	0
	MF	(England) ENG	Ronnie Dicks	39	0	37	0	2	0	0	0
	FW	(England) ENG	Billy Day	25	6	25	6	0	0	0	0
	FW	(England) ENG	Joe Scott	38	10	36	7	2	3	0	0
	FW	(England) ENG	Charlie Wayman	25	16	23	15	2	1	0	0
	FW	(Republic of Ireland) IRL	Arthur Fitzsimons	42	14	40	14	2	0	0	0
	FW	(Jamaica) JAM	Lindy Delapenha	37	18	35	17	2	1	0	0
	GK	(England) ENG	Peter Taylor	6	0	6	0	0	0	0	0
	MF	(England) ENG	Bert Mitchell	21	1	19	1	2	0	0	0
	DF	(England) ENG	Ray Bilcliff	21	0	19	0	2	0	0	0
	DF	(England) ENG	Brian Phillips	12	0	12	0	0	0	0	0
	DF	(England) ENG	Bobby Corbett	13	0	12	0	1	0	0	0
	FW	(England) ENG	Brian Clough	9	3	9	3	0	0	0	0
	FW	(England) ENG	Alan Peacock	6	2	6	2	0	0	0	0
	FW	(England) ENG	Derek McLean	6	2	6	2	0	0	0	0
	FW	(England) ENG	Ken McPherson	5	4	5	4	0	0	0	0
	MF	(Scotland) SCO	Sam Lawrie	5	2	5	2	0	0	0	0
	MF	(England) ENG	Joe Birbeck	3	0	3	0	0	0	0	0
	MF	(England) ENG	Frank Mulholland	3	0	3	0	0	0	0	0
	FW	(England) ENG	Doug Cooper	1	0	1	0	0	0	0	0
	MF	(England) ENG	Peter Stephenson	0	0	0	0	0	0	0	0

- Source: https://www.11v11.com/teams/middlesbrough/tab/matches/season/1956/
