= 1956–57 Middlesbrough F.C. season =

Middlesbrough
1956–57 season
- Chairman: Eric Thomas
- Manager: Bob Dennison
- Stadium: Ayresome Park
- Division Two: 6th
- FA Cup: Fourth Round
- Top goalscorer: League: Brian Clough (38); All: Clough (40)
Home colours	Away colours

The 1956–57 season was Middlesbrough's 74th year in existence and 3rd consecutive season in the Division Two. Also the club competed in the FA Cup.

== Summary ==
In his third season as manager Bob Dennison took off Boro to the 6th place just 6 points below promotion. Chairman Eric Thomas transferred in Goalkeeper Esmond Million and from Leicester City winger Ron Burbeck being crucial with a lot of assists through the season. The offensive live was "reinforced" by a young Forward Brian Clough scoring a massive 40 goals during his first campaign in form, 38 in Division Two just 6 below topscorer A. Rowley (Leicester City). Meanwhile, the squad reached the FA Cup fourth round being eliminated by Aston Villa.

== Squad ==
Note: Flags indicate national team as defined under FIFA eligibility rules; some limited exceptions apply. Players may hold more than one non-FIFA nationality.

Pos.	Nation	Player
GK	ENG	Peter Taylor
GK	ENG	Esmond Million
DF	ENG	Ray Barnard
DF	ENG	Dicky Robinson
DF	ENG	Derek Stonehouse
DF	ENG	Ray Bilcliff
DF	ENG	Brian Phillips
DF	ENG	Tom Brown
DF	ENG	Bobby Corbett
MF	ENG	Frank Mulholland
MF	SCO	Sam Lawrie

Pos.	Nation	Player
MF	ENG	Ronnie Dicks (c)
MF	WAL	Bill Harris
FW	ENG	Ron Burbeck
FW	ENG	Billy Day
FW	ENG	Derek McLean
FW	ENG	Brian Clough
FW	IRL	Arthur Fitzsimons
FW	ENG	Joe Scott
FW	ENG	Alan Peacock
FW	ENG	Doug Cooper
FW	JAM	Lindy Delapenha

=== Transfers ===
In
Pos.	Name	from	Type
FW	Ronnie Burbeck	Leicester City	
GK	Esmond Million	Youth team	

Out
Pos.	Name	To	Type
GK	Rolando Ugolini	Wrexham A.F.C.	
FW	Charlie Wayman	Darlington F.C.	
MF	Bert Mitchell	Southport F.C.	
FW	Ken McPherson	Coventry City	
MF	Joe Birbeck	Grimsby Town	
FW	Doug Cooper		
MF	Peter Stephenson		

== Results ==
=== Division Two ===
==== League table ====
Pos	Team	Pld	W	D	L	GF	GA	GAv	Pts
4	Blackburn Rovers	42	21	10	11	83	75	1.107	52
5	Stoke City	42	20	8	14	83	58	1.431	48
6	Middlesbrough	42	19	10	13	84	60	1.400	48
7	Sheffield United	42	19	8	15	87	76	1.145	46
8	West Ham United	42	19	8	15	59	63	0.937	46

Rules for classification: 1) Points; 2) Goal average; 3) Goals scored

==== Results by round ====
Round	1	2	3	4	5	6	7	8	9	10	11	12	13	14	15	16	17	18	19	20	21	22	23	24	25	26	27	28	29	30	31	32	33	34	35	36	37	38	39	40	41	42
Ground	H	A	A	H	A	A	H	H	A	H	A	H	A	H	A	H	A	H	A	H	A	A	H	H	A	H	A	H	A	H	A	H	A	H	A	H	A	H	A	H	H	A
Result	D	L	W	D	D	L	W	W	L	D	D	W	W	W	D	W	W	W	L	W	L	L	L	W	L	L	W	D	W	L	L	L	L	W	W	D	D	W	D	W	W	W
Position	11	13	10	12	10	13	10	6	11	11	11	9	8	7	5	4	3	3	5	4	5	5	5	5	6	8	8	6	5	7	8	9	10	10	9	9	9	8	9	7	6	5

Source: https://www.11v11.com/teams/middlesbrough/tab/matches/season/1956/
A = Away; H = Home; W = Win; D = Draw; L = Loss; = Champions, Promoted to 1956-57 Division One; = Promoted to 1956–57 Division One; = Relegated to 1956–57 Division Three

==== Matches ====
- .- Source: https://www.11v11.com/teams/middlesbrough/tab/matches/season/1957/

18 August 1956 1	Middlesbrough	1–1	Stoke City	Middlesbrough
	Harris 86'		15' (pen.) Cairns	Stadium: Ayresome Park; Attendance: 13,413; Referee: K Dagnall

21 August 1956 2	Bury F.C.	3–2	Middlesbrough	Bury
	Parker 28'; Tilley 58'; Robinson 89'		47', 67' Clough	Stadium: Gigg Lane; Attendance: 14,979; Referee: PF Power

25 August 1956 3	Barnsley F.C.	1–3	Middlesbrough	Barnsley
	Lol Chappell 62'		10', 16' Clough; 33' Delapenha	Stadium: Oakwell; Attendance: 11,651; Referee: P Rhodes

29 August 1956 4	Middlesbrough	2–2	Bury F.C.	Middlesbrough
	Delapenha 22'; Clough 39'		42', 57' Pearson	Stadium: Ayresome Park; Attendance: 18,344; Referee: PF Power

1 September 1956 5	Leicester City	1–1	Middlesbrough	Leicester
	Gardiner 55'		46' Clough	Stadium: Filbert Street; Attendance: 27,227; Referee: JH Clough

4 September 1956 6	Grimsby Town	3–2	Middlesbrough	Cleethorpes
	Evans 23'; Crosbie 43'; Maddison 50'		53', 89' Clough	Stadium: Blundell Park; Attendance: 20,505

8 September 1956 7	Middlesbrough	3–2	Bristol Rovers	Middlesbrough
	Scott 26'; Clough 39'; Peacock 85'		37' Biggs; 53' Hooper	Stadium: Ayresome Park; Attendance: 19,149; Referee: W Hickson

12 September 1956 8	Middlesbrough	2–1	Grimsby Town	Middlesbrough
	Delapenha 64' (pen.); Clough 74'		69' Crosbie	Stadium: Ayresome Park; Attendance: 15,999; Referee: L Howarth

15 September 1956 9	Notts County	2–1	Middlesbrough	Nottingham
	Russell 35'; Jackson 54'		83' Harris	Stadium: Meadow Lane; Attendance: 10,190; Referee: J Cook

22 September 1956 10	Middlesbrough	1–1	Liverpool F.C.	Middlesbrough
	Clough 80'		15' (o.g.) Robinson	Stadium: Ayresome Park; Attendance: 21,912; Referee: AW Luty

29 September 1956 11	Leyton Orient	1–1	Middlesbrough	Leyton (London)
	Ken Facey 77'		44' Clough	Stadium: Brisbane Road; Attendance: 17,146; Referee: J Kelly

6 October 1956 12	Middlesbrough	3–1	Port Vale F.C.	Middlesbrough
	Delapenha 11' (pen.), 31' (pen.); Clough 23'		Stephenson	Stadium: Ayresome Park; Attendance: 18,586; Referee: E Crawford

13 October 1956 13	Rotherham United	3–2	Middlesbrough	Rotherham
	Roy Stephenson 8'; Jack Selkirk 84'; Ron Burbeck 89'		Brian Clough 24'; Derek McLean 27'	Stadium: Millmoor; Attendance: 13,644; Referee: H Haworth

20 October 1956 14	Middlesbrough	4–1	Bristol City	Middlesbrough
	Brian Clough 37', 55'; Lindy Delapenha 75'; Bill Harris 87'		Jimmy Rogers 74'	Stadium: Ayresome Park; Attendance: 23,824; Referee: F Collinge

27 October 1956 15	Swansea Town F.C.	2–2	Middlesbrough	Swansea, Wales
	Ivor J Allchurch 2'; Mel Charles 68'		Ronnie Dicks 75'; Derek McLean 78'	Stadium: Vetch Field; Attendance: 17,552; Referee: JS Pickles

3 November 1956 16	Middlesbrough	3–1	Fulham F.C.	Middlesbrough
	Derek McLean 8'; Brian Clough 26'; Ron Burbeck 30'		Jimmy Hill 67'	Stadium: Ayresome Park; Attendance: 29,201; Referee: JS McLoughlin

10 November 1956 17	Nottingham Forest	0–4	Middlesbrough	Nottingham
			Brian Clough 44', 68', 79'; Arthur Fitzsimons 81'	Stadium: City Ground; Attendance: 20,862; Referee: H Haworth

17 November 1956 18	Middlesbrough	3–1	West Ham United	Middlesbrough
	Ron Burbeck 27'; Arthur Fitzsimons 31', 37'		Ken Tucker 7'	Stadium: Ayresome Park; Attendance: 31,513; Referee: F Cowen

24 November 1956 19	Blackburn Rovers	1–0	Middlesbrough	Blackburn
	Tommy Briggs 25'			Stadium: Ewood Park; Attendance: 21,066; Referee: JV Sherlock

1 December 1956 20	Middlesbrough	3–0	Lincoln City F.C.	Middlesbrough
	Lindy Delapenha 23', 43' (pen.); Brian Clough 56'			Stadium: Ayresome Park; Attendance: 24,598; Referee: M McCoy

8 December 1956 21	Sheffield United	2–1	Middlesbrough	Sheffield
	Jack Wilkinson 68'; Derek Hawksworth 83'		89' Derek McLean	Stadium: Bramall Lane; Attendance: 20,479; Referee: JS Swain

15 December 1956 22	Stoke City	3–1	Middlesbrough	Stoke-on-Trent
	Tim Coleman 55', 83', 88'		28' Arthur Fitzsimons	Stadium: Victoria Ground; Attendance: 20,689; Referee: K Dagnall

22 December 1956 23	Middlesbrough	1–2	Barnsley F.C.	Middlesbrough
	Ronnie Dicks 82'		Johnny McCann 6'; Johnny Edgar 9'	Stadium: Ayresome Park; Attendance: 11,147; Referee: P Rhodes

25 December 1956 24	Middlesbrough	3–2	Doncaster Rovers	Middlesbrough
	Brian Clough, Bill Harris		Ronnie Walker; Tommy Cavanagh	Stadium: Ayresome Park; Attendance: 16,515; Referee: PF Power

26 December 1956 25	Doncaster Rovers	2–1	Middlesbrough	Doncaster
	Bert Tindill; Tommy Cavanagh		62' Dicky Robinson	Stadium: Belle Vue; Attendance: 8,975; Referee: PF Power

29 December 1956 26	Middlesbrough	1–3	Leicester City	Middlesbrough
	Arthur Fitzsimons 10'		30' Billy Wright; 38' Colin Appleton; 43' Arthur Rowley	Stadium: Ayresome Park; Attendance: 29,704; Referee: JH Clough

12 January 1957 27	Bristol Rovers	0–2	Middlesbrough	Bristol
			66' Joe Scott; 89' Brian Clough	Stadium: Eastville Stadium; Attendance: 24,015; Referee: W Hickson

19 January 1957 28	Middlesbrough	0–0	Notts County	Middlesbrough
				Stadium: Ayresome Park; Attendance: 23,085; Referee: J Cook

2 February 1957 29	Liverpool F.C.	1–2	Middlesbrough	Liverpool
	Alan A'Court		43' Arthur Fitzsimons; 64' Ron Burbeck	Stadium: Anfield; Attendance: 38,890; Referee: AW Luty

9 February 1957 30	Middlesbrough	1–2	Leyton Orient	Middlesbrough
	Brian Clough 2'		20' Phil Woosnam; 41' Tommy Johnston	Stadium: Ayresome Park; Attendance: 27,315; Referee: J Kelly

16 February 1957 31	Port Vale F.C.	2–1	Middlesbrough	Burslem (Stoke-on-Trent)
	Cyril Done 51'; Bill Spurdle 82'		3' Brian Clough	Stadium: Vale Park; Attendance: 12,064; Referee: E Crawford

23 February 1957 32	Middlesbrough	0–1	Rotherham United	Middlesbrough
			12' Roy Stephenson	Stadium: Ayresome Park; Attendance: 14,829; Referee: H Haworth

2 March 1957 33	Bristol City	2–1	Middlesbrough	Bristol
	Bobby Etheridge 10'; Johnny Watkins 43' (pen.)		21' Derek McLean	Stadium: Ashton Gate; Attendance: 22,402; Referee: F Collinge

9 March 1957 34	Middlesbrough	6–2	Swansea Town F.C.	Middlesbrough
	Arthur Fitzsimons 2'; Billy Day 9'; Bill Harris 11' (pen.); Derek McLean 35'; Brian Clough 61', 82'		50' Bert McIntosh; 89' (o.g) Derek Stonehouse	Stadium: Ayresome Park; Attendance: 17,072

16 March 1957 35	Fulham F.C.	1–2	Middlesbrough	Fulham
	Trevor 'Tosh' Chamberlain; Derek McLean 29'		7' Clough	Stadium: Craven Cottage; Attendance: 20,450; Referee: JS McLoughlin

23 March 1957 36	Middlesbrough	2–2	Nottingham Forest	Middlesbrough
	McLean 70'; Clough 82'		10' Higham; 79' Barrett	Stadium: Ayresome Park; Attendance: 25,009; Referee: H Haworth

30 March 1957 37	West Ham United	1–1	Middlesbrough	Upton Park
	Allison		18' Clough	Stadium: Boleyn Ground; Attendance: 15,166; Referee: F Cowen

6 April 1957 38	Middlesbrough	2–1	Blackburn Rovers	Middlesbrough
	Clough 85', 86'		Peter Dobing	Stadium: Ayresome Park; Attendance: 20,716; Referee: JV Sherlock

13 April 1957 39	Lincoln City	1–1	Middlesbrough	Lincoln
	Northcott 56'		8' McLean	Stadium: Sincil Bank; Attendance: 8,601; Referee: M McCoy

20 April 1957 40	Middlesbrough	3–1	Sheffield United	Middlesbrough
	Harris 34' (pen.), 55' (pen.); Clough 74'		83' Ringstead	Stadium: Ayresome Park; Attendance: 21,075; Referee: JS Swain

22 April 1957 41	Middlesbrough	7–2	Huddersfield Town	Middlesbrough
	Clough 24'; Clough 49'; McLean 73'; Fitzsimons 80'; Harris 82' (pen.); Clough 85'; Clough 87'		8' Hickson; 53' Les Massie	Stadium: Ayresome Park; Attendance: 20,651

23 April 1957 42	Huddersfield Town	0–1	Middlesbrough	Huddersfield
			27' Fitzsimons	Stadium: Kirklees; Attendance: 13,818

=== FA Cup ===
==== Third Round ====
5 January 1957 3	Middlesbrough	1–1	Charlton Athletic	Middlesbrough
	Joe Scott 72'		53' Buck Ryan	Stadium: Ayresome Park; Attendance: 32,863; Referee: RH Windle

10 January 1957 replay	Charlton Athletic	2–3	Middlesbrough	Charlton (London)
	Stuart Leary 21'; Ray Barnard 37' (o.g.)		20' Billy Day; 44' Brian Clough; 55'Arthur Fitzsimons	Stadium: The Valley; Attendance: 22,613; Referee: RH Windle

==== Fourth Round ====
26 January 1957 4	Middlesbrough	2–3	Aston Villa	Middlesbrough
	Brian Clough 28'; Bill Harris 41'		39' Derek 'Doc' Pace; 53' Les Smith; 72' Johnny Dixon	Stadium: Ayresome Park; Attendance: 42,396; Referee: GW Pullin

== Statistics ==
=== Squad statistics ===
No.	Pos	Nat	Player	Total		Football League Division Two		FA Cup		Other	
No.	Pos	Nat	Player	Apps	Goals	Apps	Goals	Apps	Goals	Apps	Goals
	GK	(England) ENG	Peter Taylor	41	0	38	0	3	0	0	0
	DF	(England) ENG	Ray Barnard	33	0	30	0	3	0	0	0
	DF	(England) ENG	Dicky Robinson	42	1	39	1	3	0	0	0
	DF	(England) ENG	Derek Stonehouse	25	0	22	0	3	0	0	0
	MF	(Wales) WAL	Bill Harris	45	9	42	8	3	1	0	0
	MF	(England) ENG	Ronnie Dicks	44	2	41	2	3	0	0	0
	FW	(England) ENG	Ron Burbeck	34	4	31	4	3	0	0	0
	FW	(England) ENG	Derek McLean	29	10	29	10	0	0	0	0
	FW	(England) ENG	Brian Clough	44	40	41	38	3	2	0	0
	FW	(Republic of Ireland) IRL	Arthur Fitzsimons	39	10	36	9	3	1	0	0
	FW	(Jamaica) JAM	Lindy Delapenha	27	8	26	8	1	0	0	0
	GK	(England) ENG	Esmond Million	4	0	4	0	0	0	0	0
	DF	(England) ENG	Ray Bilcliff	21	0	21	0	0	0	0	0
	FW	(England) ENG	Joe Scott	22	3	19	2	3	1	0	0
	FW	(England) ENG	Billy Day	19	2	17	1	2	1	0	0
	DF	(England) ENG	Brian Phillips	10	0	10	0	0	0	0	0
	MF	(Scotland) SCO	Sam Lawrie	4	0	4	0	0	0	0	0
	FW	(England) ENG	Alan Peacock	4	1	4	1	0	0	0	0
	DF	(England) ENG	Tom Brown	3	0	3	0	0	0	0	0
	FW	(England) ENG	Doug Cooper	3	0	3	0	0	0	0	0
	DF	(England) ENG	Bobby Corbett	1	0	1	0	0	0	0	0
	MF	(England) ENG	Frank Mulholland	1	0	1	0	0	0	0	0

- Source: https://www.11v11.com/teams/middlesbrough/tab/matches/season/1957/
