= 1958–59 Middlesbrough F.C. season =

Middlesbrough
1958–59 season
- Chairman: Eric Thomas
- Manager: Bob Dennison
- Stadium: Ayresome Park
- Division Two: 13th
- FA Cup: 3rd round
- Top goalscorer: League: Brian Clough (43); All: Clough (43)
Home colours	Away colours

The 1958–59 season was Middlesbrough's 76th year in existence and 5th consecutive season in the Division Two. Also the club competed in the FA Cup.

== Summary ==
In his fifth season as manager Bob Dennison took off Boro to the 13th place a massive twenty points below promotion to Division One. Forward Brian Clough scored 43 goals being Division Two topscorer with another brilliant partnership among Alan Peacock. After the departure of Jamaican Lindy Delapenha during summer, the offensive line was hit with several injuries such as Mc Lean and Fitzsimons, forcing Dennison and the staff coach to line up Scottish Forward Willie Fernie who delivered a decent performance after arriving from the Scot squad playing the 1958 FIFA World Cup. In spite of a premier class offensive line, Boro again collapsed due to a weak defensive line despite the arrival of Ray Yeoman and future starter Left-back Defender Mick McNeil allowing a lot of goals against both Goalkeepers Taylor and Million. Also, the squad reached the FA Cup third round being eliminated by Birmingham City.

== Squad ==
Note: Flags indicate national team as defined under FIFA eligibility rules; some limited exceptions apply. Players may hold more than one non-FIFA nationality.

Pos.	Nation	Player
GK	ENG	Peter Taylor
GK	ENG	Esmond Million
DF	WAL	Bill Harris
DF	ENG	Ray Bilcliff
DF	ENG	Brian Phillips
DF	ENG	Derek Stonehouse
DF	SCO	Ray Yeoman
DF	ENG	Dicky Robinson
DF	ENG	Ray Barnard
DF	ENG	Mick McNeil
DF	ENG	Brian Jordan
DF	ENG	Joe Birbeck
MF	ENG	Ernie Walley

Pos.	Nation	Player
MF	ENG	Billy Day
MF	ENG	Ronnie Dicks
MF	ENG	Carl Taylor
MF	SCO	Billy Wilkinson
FW	ENG	Ron Burbeck
FW	ENG	Eddie Holliday
FW	SCO	Willie Fernie
FW	ENG	Derek McLean
FW	ENG	Brian Clough (c)
FW	ENG	Alan Peacock
FW	ENG	Alan Rodgerson
FW	IRL	Arthur Fitzsimons
FW	ENG	Joe Scott
FW	ENG	George Crook

=== Transfers ===
In
Pos.	Name	from	Type
DF	Ray Yeoman	Northampton Town	
MF	Ernie Walley	Tottenham Hotspur	
DF	Mick McNeil	Youth team	
DF	Brian Jordan	Rotherham United	
MF	Billy Wilkinson		
FW	Willie Fernie	Celtic	
FW	Alan Rodgerson		
FW	George Crook		

Out
Pos.	Name	To	Type
MF	Lindy Delapenha	Mansfield Town	
MF	Arthur Fitzsimons	Lincoln City	

== Results ==
=== Second Division ===
==== League table ====
Pos	Team	Pld	W	D	L	GF	GA	GAv	Pts
11	Swansea Town	42	16	9	17	79	81	0.975	41
12	Brighton & Hove Albion	42	15	11	16	74	90	0.822	41
13	Middlesbrough	42	15	10	17	87	71	1.225	40
14	Huddersfield Town	42	16	8	18	62	55	1.127	40
15	Sunderland	42	16	8	18	64	75	0.853	40

Rules for classification: 1) Points; 2) Goal average; 3) Goals scored

==== Results by round ====
Round	1	2	3	4	5	6	7	8	9	10	11	12	13	14	15	16	17	18	19	20	21	22	23	24	25	26	27	28	29	30	31	32	33	34	35	36	37	38	39	40	41	42
Ground	H	A	A	H	H	A	A	H	A	H	A	H	A	H	A	H	A	H	A	H	A	A	H	A	H	H	H	A	H	A	H	H	A	H	A	A	H	A	A	H	H	A
Result	W	W	L	D	W	W	L	L	L	D	L	D	D	L	L	W	L	W	L	L	L	W	W	L	W	D	L	D	D	W	L	W	L	W	D	L	W	W	W	D	D	L
Position	1	1	4	5	4	3	4	4	7	9	11	10	9	15	17	13	16	13	15	16	18	17	13	15	12	14	15	16	16	15	16	14	16	13	14	15	15	13	10	11	12	13

Source: https://www.11v11.com/teams/middlesbrough/tab/matches/season/1959/
A = Away; H = Home; W = Win; D = Draw; L = Loss; = Champions, Promoted to 1959-60 Division One; = Promoted to 1959–60 Division One; = Relegated to 1959–60 Division Three

==== Matches ====
- .- Source: https://www.11v11.com/teams/middlesbrough/tab/matches/season/1959/

==== Matches ====
23 August 1958 1	Middlesbrough	9–0	Brighton & Hove Albion	Middlesbrough
	Harris 5' (pen.), 26' (pen.); Clough 15', 41', 50', 60', 82'; Peacock 18', 73'	1		Stadium: Ayresome Park; Attendance: 32,367; Referee: K Dagnall

25 August 1958 2	Sheffield United	0–1	Middlesbrough	Sheffield
		1	57' Clough	Stadium: Bramall Lane; Attendance: 25,666

30 August 1958 3	Grimsby Town	3–2	Middlesbrough	Cleethorpes
	Mick Cullen 35', 40'; Ron Rafferty 88'	4	25' Clough; 36' Billy Day	Stadium: Blundell Park; Attendance: 21,327; Referee: M McCoy

3 September 1958 4	Middlesbrough	0–0	Sheffield United	Middlesbrough
		5		Stadium: Ayresome Park; Attendance: 42,866

6 September 1958 5	Middlesbrough	2–1	Liverpool	Middlesbrough
	Clough 35', 57'	4	34' Jimmy Harrower	Stadium: Ayresome Park; Attendance: 34,714; Referee: L Howarth

11 September 1958 6	Rotherham United	1–4	Middlesbrough	Rotherham
	Barry Webster 5'	3	25', 61' Alan Rodgerson; 75', 89' Clough	Stadium: Millmoor; Attendance: 12,089

13 September 1958 7	Stoke City	3–1	Middlesbrough	Stoke-on-Trent
	Harry Oscroft 20'; Johnny King 23'; Don Ratcliffe 89'	4	9' Clough	Stadium: Victoria Ground; Attendance: 24,866; Referee: F Collinge

17 September 1958 8	Middlesbrough	1–2	Rotherham United	Middlesbrough
	Clough 55'	4	10' (pen.) Albert Broadbent; 30' Ken Twidle	Stadium: Ayresome Park; Attendance: 34,231

20 September 1958 9	Charlton Athletic	1–0	Middlesbrough	Charlton (Southeast London)
	Buck Ryan 69'	7		Stadium: The Valley; Attendance: 19,407; Referee: BM Griffiths

27 September 1958 10	Middlesbrough	0–0	Bristol City	Middlesbrough
		9		Stadium: Ayresome Park; Attendance: 29,498; Referee: R Ryalls

4 October 1958 12	Cardiff City	3–2	Middlesbrough	Cardiff
	Brian Jenkins 35'; Ron Hewitt 55'; Brian Walsh 56'	11	71' Peacock; 81' Brian Phillips	Stadium: Ninian Park; Attendance: 20,560; Referee: KA Collinge

11 October 1958 12	Middlesbrough	0–0	Sunderland	Middlesbrough
		10		Stadium: Ayresome Park; Attendance: 37,223; Referee: LN Peake

18 October 1958 13	Lincoln City	1–1	Middlesbrough	Lincoln
	Ron Harbertson 54'	9	16' Peacock	Stadium: Sincil Bank; Attendance: 10,803; Referee: J Powell

25 October 1958 14	Middlesbrough	2–3	Fulham	Middlesbrough
	Clough 44', 60'	15	9', 11', 34' Graham Leggat	Stadium: Ayresome Park; Attendance: 31,973; Referee: F Cowen

1 November 1958 15	Swansea Town	5–2	Middlesbrough	Swansea
	Herbie Williams 4'; Norman Lawson 36'; Mel Charles 55', 79', 84'	17	12' Alan Peacock; 89' Eddie Holliday	Stadium: Vetch Field; Attendance: 15,741; Referee: NC Taylor

8 November 1958 16	Middlesbrough	6–1	Scunthorpe United	Middlesbrough
	Alan Peacock 1', 13', 21'; Clough 40', 62', 88'	13	16' Peter Neale	Stadium: Ayresome Park; Attendance: 23,020

15 November 1958 17	Leyton Orient	5–2	Middlesbrough	Leyton (East London)
	Len Julians 42', 74', 84'; Phil White 77'; Mark Lazarus 89'	16	10', 80' Peacock	Stadium: Brisbane Road; Attendance: 10,234; Referee: K Dagnall

22 November 1958 18	Middlesbrough	5–0	Derby County	Middlesbrough
	Eddie Holliday 19'; Bill Harris 24'; Peacock 52'; Joe Scott 69'; Glyn Davies 76' (o.g.)	13		Stadium: Ayresome Park; Attendance: 16,773

29 November 1958 19	Bristol Rovers	3–1	Middlesbrough	Bristol
	Peter Hooper 53'; Geoff Bradford 67', 89'	15	10' Clough	Stadium: Eastville Stadium; Attendance: 15,767; Referee: KG Aston

6 December 1958 20	Middlesbrough	2–3	Ipswich Town	Middlesbrough
	Clough 2'; Ron Burbeck 17'	16	7', 63' Ray Crawford; 42' Peter Berry	Stadium: Ayresome Park; Attendance: 25,946; Referee: LJ Tirebuck

13 December 1958 21	Sheffield Wednesday	2–0	Middlesbrough	Sheffield
	Ray Bilcliff 27' (o.g.); Norman Curtis 52' (pen.)	18		Stadium: Hillsborough; Referee: J Mitchell attendance=25,127

20 December 1958 22	Brighton & Hove Albion	4–6	Middlesbrough	Brighton
	John Shepherd 67', 70'; Freddie Jones 81'; Dave Sexton 85'	17	20', 36' Alan Peacock; 53', 55', 65' Clough; 75' (o.g.) Jack Bertolini	Stadium: Goldstone Ground; Attendance: 21,063; Referee: AE Moore

26 December 1958 23	Middlesbrough	3–1	Barnsley	Middlesbrough
	Clough 30', 55'; Peacock 75'	13	1' Arthur Kaye	Stadium: Ayresome Park; Attendance: 31,720

27 December 1958 24	Barnsley	1–0	Middlesbrough	Barnsley
	Lol Chappell 58'	15		Stadium: Oakwell; Attendance: 14,917

1 January 1959 25	Middlesbrough	3–1	Huddersfield Town	Middlesbrough
	Clough 36', 52'; Willie Fernie 41'	12	1' Stan Howard	Stadium: Ayresome Park; Attendance: 28,154

31 January 1959 26	Middlesbrough	0–0	Stoke City	Middlesbrough
		14		Stadium: Ayresome Park; Attendance: 19,077; Referee: AW Luty

7 February 1959 27	Middlesbrough	1–3	Charlton Athletic	Middlesbrough
	Peacock 27'	15	60' Sam Lawrie; Johnny Summers 63', 82'	Stadium: Ayresome Park; Attendance: 16,210; Referee: JS McLoughlin

14 February 1959 28	Bristol City	2–2	Middlesbrough	Bristol
	John Atyeo 37'; Bobby Etheridge 79'	16	49' (pen.) Bill Harris; 73' Clough	Stadium: Ashton Gate; Attendance: 18,336; Referee: ER Hill

21 February 1959 29	Middlesbrough	1–1	Cardiff City	Middlesbrough
	Peacock 32'	16	35' Brian Walsh	Stadium: Ayresome Park; Attendance: 12,986; Referee: H Webb

28 February 1959 30	Scunthorpe United	0–3	Middlesbrough	Scunthorpe
		15	10', 53', 64' Clough	Stadium: Old Show Ground; Attendance: 11,171; Referee: RM Jordan

7 March 1959 31	Middlesbrough	1–2	Lincoln City	Middlesbrough
	Peacock 50'	16	20' Brian Wright; 67' John McClelland	Stadium: Ayresome Park; Attendance: 14,396; Referee: TH Cooper

11 March 1959 32	Middlesbrough	1–0	Grimsby Town	Middlesbrough
	Clough 4'	14		Stadium: Ayresome Park; Attendance: 12,019; Referee: E Crawford

14 March 1959 33	Fulham	3–2	Middlesbrough	Fulham (West London)
	Graham Leggat 35'; Johnny Haynes 72'; Tony Barton 74'	16	46' Clough; 54' Bill Harris	Stadium: Craven Cottage; Attendance: 26,800; Referee: AW Sparling

21 March 1959 34	Middlesbrough	6–2	Swansea Town	Middlesbrough
	Clough 5', 32', 42', 52'; Fernie 77'; Bill Harris 83' (pen.)	13	20' Mel Charles; 65' Reg Davies	Stadium: Ayresome Park; Attendance: 15,272

28 March 1959 35	Sunderland	0–0	Middlesbrough	Sunderland
		14		Stadium: Roker Park; Attendance: 45,954; Referee: KA Collinge

30 March 1959 36	Huddersfield Town	5–1	Middlesbrough	Huddersfield
	Stan Howard; Gordon Low; Les Massie; Willie Sinclair; Kevin McHale	15	62' Clough	Stadium: Leeds Road; Attendance: 14,671; Referee: ER Hill

4 April 1959 37	Middlesbrough	4–2	Leyton Orient	Middlesbrough
	Peacock 9', 66'; Bill Harris 19'; Clough 68'	15	72' (pen.) George Wright; 88' Joe Elwood	Stadium: Ayresome Park; Attendance: 20,683; Referee: LJ Hamer

8 April 1959 38	Liverpool	1–2	Middlesbrough	Liverpool
	79' Jimmy Melia	13	Eddie Holliday 53'; Clough 65'	Stadium: Anfield; Attendance: 36,288; Referee: JW Topliss

11 April 1959 39	Derby County	0–3	Middlesbrough	Derby
		10	22', 46' Clough; 42' Ron Burbeck	Stadium: Baseball Ground; Attendance: 19,911; Referee: D Martin

18 April 1959 40	Middlesbrough	2–2	Bristol Rovers	Middlesbrough
	Ronnie Burbeck 38'; Clough 65'	11	34' Dai Ward; 50' (o.g.) Derek Stonehouse	Stadium: Ayresome Park; Attendance: 17,451; Referee: G McCabe

22 April 1959 41	Middlesbrough	2–2	Sheffield Wednesday	Middlesbrough
	Alan Rodgerson 13'; Eddie Holliday 68'	12	32' John Fantham; 65' Roy Shiner	Stadium: Ayresome Park; Attendance: 25,822; Referee: L Howarth

25 April 1959 42	Ipswich Town	2–1	Middlesbrough	Ipswich
	Ted Phillips 73', 80' (pen.)	13	6' Ron Burbeck	Stadium: Portman Road; Attendance: 11,927; Referee: W.O.RAF Baxter

=== FA Cup ===
24 January 1959 3	Middlesbrough	0–1	Birmingham City	Middlesbrough
			19' (o.g.) Bill Harris	Stadium: Ayresome Park; Attendance: 36,587; Referee: LJ Hamer

== Statistics ==
=== Squad statistics ===
No.	Pos	Nat	Player	Total		Football League Division Two		FA Cup		Other	
No.	Pos	Nat	Player	Apps	Goals	Apps	Goals	Apps	Goals	Apps	Goals
	GK	(England) ENG	Peter Taylor	30	0	30	0	0	0	0	0
	DF	(England) ENG	Ray Bilcliff	22	0	21	0	1	0	0	0
	DF	(England) ENG	Brian Phillips	38	1	37	1	1	0	0	0
	DF	(England) ENG	Derek Stonehouse	40	0	39	0	1	0	0	0
	MF	(Wales) WAL	Bill Harris	37	7	36	7	1	0	0	0
	MF	(Scotland) SCO	Ray Yeoman	23	0	22	0	1	0	0	0
	FW	(England) ENG	Ron Burbeck	27	4	26	4	1	0	0	0
	FW	(Scotland) SCO	Willie Fernie	24	2	23	2	1	0	0	0
	FW	(England) ENG	Brian Clough	43	43	42	43	1	0	0	0
	FW	(England) ENG	Alan Peacock	35	19	34	19	1	0	0	0
	FW	(England) ENG	Eddie Holliday	29	4	29	4	0	0	0	0
	GK	(England) ENG	Esmond Million	13	0	12	0	1	0	0	0
	FW	(England) ENG	Billy Day	15	1	14	1	1	0	0	0
	DF	(England) ENG	Dicky Robinson	14	0	14	0	0	0	0	0
	FW	(England) ENG	Alan Rodgerson	11	3	11	3	0	0	0	0
	FW	(England) ENG	Derek McLean	11	0	11	0	0	0	0	0
	DF	(England) ENG	Ray Barnard	11	0	11	0	0	0	0	0
	FW	(Republic of Ireland) IRL	Arthur Fitzsimons	10	0	10	0	0	0	0	0
	MF	(England) ENG	Ronnie Dicks	8	0	8	0	0	0	0	0
	DF	(England) ENG	Ernie Walley	8	0	8	0	0	0	0	0
	DF	(England) ENG	Mick McNeil	7	0	7	0	0	0	0	0
	MF	(England) ENG	Carl Taylor	6	0	6	0	0	0	0	0
	DF	(England) ENG	Brian Jordan	5	0	5	0	0	0	0	0
	FW	(England) ENG	Joe Scott	4	1	4	1	0	0	0	0
	DF	(England) ENG	Joe Birbeck	2	0	2	0	0	0	0	0
	FW	(England) ENG	George Crook	0	0	0	0	0	0	0	0
	MF	(Scotland) SCO	Billy Wilkinson	0	0	0	0	0	0	0	0

- Source: https://www.11v11.com/teams/middlesbrough/tab/matches/season/1959/
