= 1955–56 in English football =

Football in England
- Season: 1955–56

Men's football
- First Division: Manchester United
- Second Division: Sheffield Wednesday
- FA Cup: Manchester City

The 1955–56 season was the 76th season of competitive football in England.

== Overview ==
Defending league champions Chelsea decided not to compete in the new European Champions Cup, following opposition from the Football League about the participation of English clubs in the competition.

The league title is taken by a Manchester United side with an average age of just 22, which finished 11 points ahead of their nearest contenders, Blackpool and Wolverhampton Wanderers.

It was a Manchester double for trophies, with Manchester City winning the FA Cup, with goalkeeper Bert Trautmann famously playing on despite suffering what was later diagnosed as a broken neck in a collision with a Birmingham City player.

== Honours ==
Competition	Winner	Runner-up
First Division	Manchester United (4)	Blackpool
Second Division	Sheffield Wednesday	Leeds United
Third Division North	Grimsby Town	Derby County
Third Division South	Leyton Orient	Brighton & Hove Albion
FA Cup	Manchester City (3)	Birmingham City
Charity Shield	Chelsea	Newcastle United
Home Championship	Shared by England, Scotland, Wales and Northern Ireland	

Notes = Number in parentheses is the times that club has won that honour. * indicates new record for competition

== Awards ==
Football Writers' Association

- Footballer of the Year – Bert Trautmann (Manchester City)

Top goalscorer

- Nat Lofthouse (Bolton Wanderers), 33

== Football League ==
=== First Division ===
Manchester United won the First Division title by 11 points, featuring a squad of players with an average age of just 22, with manager Matt Busby's emphasis on youth paying dividends and answering the critics who felt that his policy would not be able to maintain United's place among the game's elite. Second place was occupied by Blackpool, with Stanley Matthews still a dominant presence in the team in his 41st year, while Wolves finished third, FA Cup winners Manchester City finished fourth, and Arsenal completed the top five. Birmingham City finished sixth to record their best ever final position.

Pos	Team	Pld	W	D	L	GF	GA	GAv	Pts	Qualification or relegation
1	Manchester United (C)	42	25	10	7	83	51	1.627	60	Qualification for the European Cup preliminary round
2	Blackpool	42	20	9	13	86	62	1.387	49	
3	Wolverhampton Wanderers	42	20	9	13	89	65	1.369	49	
4	Manchester City	42	18	10	14	82	69	1.188	46	
5	Arsenal	42	18	10	14	60	61	0.984	46	
6	Birmingham City	42	18	9	15	75	57	1.316	45	
7	Burnley	42	18	8	16	64	54	1.185	44	
8	Bolton Wanderers	42	18	7	17	71	58	1.224	43	
9	Sunderland	42	17	9	16	80	95	0.842	43	
10	Luton Town	42	17	8	17	66	64	1.031	42	
11	Newcastle United	42	17	7	18	85	70	1.214	41	
12	Portsmouth	42	16	9	17	78	85	0.918	41	
13	West Bromwich Albion	42	18	5	19	58	70	0.829	41	
14	Charlton Athletic	42	17	6	19	75	81	0.926	40	
15	Everton	42	15	10	17	55	69	0.797	40	
16	Chelsea	42	14	11	17	64	77	0.831	39	
17	Cardiff City	42	15	9	18	55	69	0.797	39	
18	Tottenham Hotspur	42	15	7	20	61	71	0.859	37	
19	Preston North End	42	14	8	20	73	72	1.014	36	
20	Aston Villa	42	11	13	18	52	69	0.754	35	
21	Huddersfield Town (R)	42	14	7	21	54	83	0.651	35	Relegation to the Second Division
22	Sheffield United (R)	42	12	9	21	63	77	0.818	33	Relegation to the Second Division

Source: World Football
Rules for classification: 1) Points; 2) Goal average; 3) Goals scored
(C) Champions; (R) Relegated

=== Second Division ===
Sheffield Wednesday swapped divisions with their cross city rivals to return to the First Division by winning the Second Division title, joined by runners-up Leeds United. Liverpool narrowly missed out on a First Division comeback by finishing third.

Pos	Team	Pld	W	D	L	GF	GA	GAv	Pts	Qualification or relegation
1	Sheffield Wednesday (C, P)	42	21	13	8	101	62	1.629	55	Promotion to the First Division
2	Leeds United (P)	42	23	6	13	80	60	1.333	52	Promotion to the First Division
3	Liverpool	42	21	6	15	85	63	1.349	48	
4	Blackburn Rovers	42	21	6	15	84	65	1.292	48	
5	Leicester City	42	21	6	15	94	78	1.205	48	
6	Bristol Rovers	42	21	6	15	84	70	1.200	48	
7	Nottingham Forest	42	19	9	14	68	63	1.079	47	
8	Lincoln City	42	18	10	14	79	65	1.215	46	
9	Fulham	42	20	6	16	89	79	1.127	46	
10	Swansea Town	42	20	6	16	83	81	1.025	46	
11	Bristol City	42	19	7	16	80	64	1.250	45	
12	Port Vale	42	16	13	13	60	58	1.034	45	
13	Stoke City	42	20	4	18	71	62	1.145	44	
14	Middlesbrough	42	16	8	18	76	78	0.974	40	
15	Bury	42	16	8	18	86	90	0.956	40	
16	West Ham United	42	14	11	17	74	69	1.072	39	
17	Doncaster Rovers	42	12	11	19	69	96	0.719	35	
18	Barnsley	42	11	12	19	47	84	0.560	34	
19	Rotherham United	42	12	9	21	56	75	0.747	33	
20	Notts County	42	11	9	22	55	82	0.671	31	
21	Plymouth Argyle (R)	42	10	8	24	54	87	0.621	28	Relegation to the Third Division South
22	Hull City (R)	42	10	6	26	53	97	0.546	26	Relegation to the Third Division North

Rules for classification: 1) Points; 2) Goal average; 3) Goals scored
(C) Champions; (P) Promoted; (R) Relegated

=== Third Division North ===
Pos	Team	Pld	W	D	L	GF	GA	GAv	Pts	Promotion or relegation
1	Grimsby Town (C, P)	46	31	6	9	76	29	2.621	68	Promotion to the Second Division
2	Derby County	46	28	7	11	110	55	2.000	63	
3	Accrington Stanley	46	25	9	12	92	57	1.614	59	
4	Hartlepools United	46	26	5	15	81	60	1.350	57	
5	Southport	46	23	11	12	66	53	1.245	57	
6	Chesterfield	46	25	4	17	94	66	1.424	54	
7	Stockport County	46	21	9	16	90	61	1.475	51	
8	Bradford City	46	18	13	15	78	64	1.219	49	
9	Scunthorpe & Lindsey United	46	20	8	18	75	63	1.190	48	
10	Workington	46	19	9	18	75	63	1.190	47	
11	York City	46	19	9	18	85	72	1.181	47	
12	Rochdale	46	17	13	16	66	84	0.786	47	
13	Gateshead	46	17	11	18	77	84	0.917	45	
14	Wrexham	46	16	10	20	66	73	0.904	42	
15	Darlington	46	16	9	21	60	73	0.822	41	
16	Tranmere Rovers	46	16	9	21	59	84	0.702	41	
17	Chester	46	13	14	19	52	82	0.634	40	
18	Mansfield Town	46	14	11	21	84	81	1.037	39	
19	Halifax Town	46	14	11	21	66	76	0.868	39	
20	Oldham Athletic	46	10	18	18	76	86	0.884	38	
21	Carlisle United	46	15	8	23	71	95	0.747	38	
22	Barrow	46	12	9	25	61	83	0.735	33	
23	Bradford (Park Avenue)	46	13	7	26	61	122	0.500	33	Re-elected
24	Crewe Alexandra	46	9	10	27	50	105	0.476	28	Re-elected

Source: rsssf.com
(C) Champions; (P) Promoted

=== Third Division South ===
Pos	Team	Pld	W	D	L	GF	GA	GAv	Pts	Promotion or relegation
1	Leyton Orient (C, P)	46	29	8	9	106	49	2.163	66	Promotion to the Second Division
2	Brighton & Hove Albion	46	29	7	10	112	50	2.240	65	
3	Ipswich Town	46	25	14	7	106	60	1.767	64	
4	Southend United	46	21	11	14	88	80	1.100	53	
5	Torquay United	46	20	12	14	86	63	1.365	52	
6	Brentford	46	19	14	13	69	66	1.045	52	
7	Norwich City	46	19	13	14	86	82	1.049	51	
8	Coventry City	46	20	9	17	73	60	1.217	49	
9	Bournemouth & Boscombe Athletic	46	19	10	17	63	51	1.235	48	
10	Gillingham	46	19	10	17	69	71	0.972	48	
11	Northampton Town	46	20	7	19	67	71	0.944	47	
12	Colchester United	46	18	11	17	76	81	0.938	47	
13	Shrewsbury Town	46	17	12	17	69	66	1.045	46	
14	Southampton	46	18	8	20	91	81	1.123	44	
15	Aldershot	46	12	16	18	70	90	0.778	40	
16	Exeter City	46	15	10	21	58	77	0.753	40	
17	Reading	46	15	9	22	70	79	0.886	39	
18	Queens Park Rangers	46	14	11	21	64	86	0.744	39	
19	Newport County	46	15	9	22	58	79	0.734	39	
20	Walsall	46	15	8	23	68	84	0.810	38	
21	Watford	46	13	11	22	52	85	0.612	37	
22	Millwall	46	15	6	25	83	100	0.830	36	
23	Crystal Palace	46	12	10	24	54	83	0.651	34	Re-elected
24	Swindon Town	46	8	14	24	34	78	0.436	30	Re-elected

(C) Champions; (P) Promoted

=== Top goalscorers ===
First Division

- Nat Lofthouse (Bolton Wanderers) – 32 goals

Second Division

- Willie Gardiner (Leicester City) – 34 goals

Third Division North

- Bob Crosbie (Grimsby Town) – 36 goals

Third Division South

- Sammy Collins (Torquay United) – 40 goals
