= Peter Taylor (footballer, born 1928) =

English footballer and manager (1928–1990)

Personal information
- Full name: Peter Thomas Taylor
- Date of birth: 2 July 1928
- Place of birth: Nottingham, England
- Date of death: 4 October 1990 (aged 62)
- Place of death: Mallorca, Spain
- Height: 6 ft 2 in (1.88 m)
- Position: Goalkeeper

Youth career
- Christchurch
- Mapperley Methodists
- 1942–1944: Nottingham Forest

Senior career*
Years	Team	Apps	(Gls)
1944–1945	Nottingham Forest	0	(0)
1945–1955	Coventry City	86	(0)
1955–1961	Middlesbrough	140	(0)
1961–1962	Port Vale	1	(0)
1962–1965	Burton Albion		
Total		227	(0)

Managerial career
- 1962–1965: Burton Albion
- 1965–1967: Hartlepools United (assistant)
- 1967–1973: Derby County (assistant)
- 1973–1974: Brighton & Hove Albion (assistant)
- 1974–1976: Brighton & Hove Albion
- 1976–1982: Nottingham Forest (assistant)
- 1982–1984: Derby County
- * Club domestic league appearances and goals

Peter Thomas Taylor (2 July 1928 – 4 October 1990) was an English football player and manager. A goalkeeper with a modest playing career, he went on to work in management alongside Brian Clough at Derby County and Nottingham Forest, winning the Football League with both clubs and the European Cup twice with Nottingham Forest.

He joined Coventry City in 1945 and spent the 1953–54 season as Coventry's first-choice goalkeeper but was otherwise mostly used as a reserve player. He was sold to Middlesbrough for £3,500 in 1955 and kept goal for the Second Division club for four full seasons after being promoted to the first-team in the 1956–57 campaign. He lost his first-team place in 1960 and in June 1961, joined Port Vale for a £750 fee. He took a free transfer to non-League Burton Albion in May 1962, where he ended his playing career. Throughout his playing career, he built for his future management career by learning from Coventry manager Harry Storer and building a close relationship with Middlesbrough striker Brian Clough, six years his junior.

He was appointed as manager of Burton Albion in October 1962 after impressing the chairman with his knowledge of the game. He built a strong team and led the club to victory in the Southern League Cup in 1964. In 1965–66 season, Clough appointed him as his assistant at Hartlepools United, and Taylor helped Clough to rebuild the playing squad with a decent eighth place in the Third Division in the 1966–67 season. The pair moved on to Derby County in May 1967, taking the club to the Second Division title in 1968–69, then the First Division title in 1971–72, and the semi-finals of the European Cup in 1973. The duo resigned in October 1973 after their strained relationship with the club's board of directors became unworkable. Clough and Taylor moved on to Brighton & Hove Albion in November 1973, and Taylor stayed on as manager after Clough left Brighton in July 1974.

In July 1976, Taylor left Brighton to work alongside Clough at Nottingham Forest. Repeating their achievement at Derby by winning promotion into the top-flight in 1976–77 and then winning the league title in 1977–78, they then surpassed their previous accomplishments by winning the European Cup in 1979 and 1980. Forest also lifted the Anglo-Scottish Cup, the FA Charity Shield, the European Super Cup, and twice won the League Cup. Taylor retired in May 1982 but returned to the game in November 1982 to manage Derby County. He retired for the second and final time in April 1984.

Following a dispute over Nottingham Forest player John Robertson's transfer in May 1983, he and Clough had not been on speaking terms, and Taylor's sudden death in October 1990 robbed Clough of the chance of reconciliation, something he greatly regretted. In April 2009, a statue of Clough and Taylor was commissioned at Derby's Pride Park Stadium. In October 2015, Nottingham Forest's main stand at the City Ground was renamed the Peter Taylor Stand.

== Playing career ==
=== Nottingham Forest ===
Peter Taylor was born on 2 July 1928, one of eight children in the Meadows, Nottingham to Tom and Jenny Taylor, an engineer and housewife, respectively. He met his future wife, Lily Thorpe, at the age of 14, who persuaded him to play for her father's team, local non-League side Christchurch. He later moved on to play for Mapperley Methodists before he was spotted by Nottingham Forest and signed to their youth team, the Forest Colts. He made his first-team debut for the club as an amateur in a wartime fixture against local rivals Notts County at Meadow Lane in 1944, at the age of 16.

=== Coventry City ===
He signed with Coventry City on his 17th birthday, though was initially only a part-time player as his father insisted that he also complete an apprenticeship in bricklaying. Under the stewardship of Harry Storer, Coventry finished seventh in the Second Division in 1950–51, and Taylor made his debut in the Football League on the final day of the season, breaking Alf Wood's run of 261 consecutive first-team appearances. The Birmingham Sports Argus described how "if Peter's role [back-up goalkeeper to Wood] has denied him the glamour of a glorious achievement in action, he has his share of personal glamour. He's a tall, fair-haired good looker and so comely that he was described as the film star of Highfield Road. Is single too." Taylor did not stay single for long, however, and married Lily Thorpe in June 1951.

Coventry were relegated in 1951–52, with Taylor having made 29 appearances. Coventry finished sixth in the Third Division South in 1952–53, with Taylor only appearing eight times. It proved to be Storer's final season as manager, and Taylor later cited Storer as his managerial mentor and would go on to quote Storer numerous times throughout his career. Taylor played 42 games as Coventry posted a 14th-place finish under Jack Fairbrother in 1953–54, then played ten matches as they finished ninth in 1954–55. Taylor decided to leave the club after losing his first-team place to future Coventry City Hall of Famer and England international Reg Matthews.

=== Middlesbrough ===
Taylor was sold to Middlesbrough in the summer of 1955 for £3,500 by new Coventry manager Jesse Carver, following an assessment of the playing staff by Carver and new coach George Raynor. It was at Middlesbrough that Taylor first met his future managerial partner Brian Clough, who was then fourth-choice striker at Ayresome Park. Taylor spotted Clough's potential and helped him to achieve a place in the first-team. Taylor initially contacted Storer, now manager of Derby County, to try and get him to sign Clough. Storer had told him he had spent the club's budget on signing Martin McDonnell and Paddy Ryan. Manager Bob Dennison led "Boro" to 14th in the Second Division in 1955–56, seeing both Clough and Taylor only as "useful reserves". The pair spent their spare time coaching schoolboys to boost their wages and to gain experience. Clough went on to become the club's star striker with 197 goals in 213 league games, and though Taylor would also break into the first-team after replacing Rolando Ugolini, he later said he was only ever an "average goalkeeper".

Bob Dennison, although one of my favourite people, was too unambitious for Brian [Clough], and his staff were in the same easygoing mould. Harold Shepherdson, the England trainer, and coaches like Micky Fenton and Jimmy Gordon were nice men running a pleasant club that treated players decently while getting nowhere.

— Though Middlesbrough provided a good environment for a self-described "average goalkeeper", Taylor felt Clough warranted a place in England's top-flight and national team.

=== Port Vale ===
In June 1961, Port Vale manager Norman Low paid Middlesbrough £750 for Taylor's services. Largely unneeded at Vale Park, Ken Hancock being a virtual ever-present from 1960 to 1964, his only appearance was in a 2–1 Third Division defeat at Bradford Park Avenue on 3 February 1962. He left on a free transfer for Burton Albion in May 1962, where he began his management career.

== Management career ==
=== Burton Albion ===
In October 1962, Taylor was offered the manager's job at Burton Albion after impressing chairman Trevor Grantham with his knowledge and theories on the game. In summer 1963 he oversaw a complete overhaul of the playing staff, only retaining four players, and completely rebuilt the squad. He signed strikers Richie Barker and Stan Round, who would score a combined 308 goals for the club, and remain the club's two highest goalscorers (as of 2021). He survived calls for his resignation after a defeat to Kidderminster Harriers in the FA Cup and went on to create one of the most successful sides in Burton's history, beating Weymouth to win the Southern League Cup in 1964. In 1965, he walked out on a newly signed £34-a-week three-year contract at Burton to become Clough's assistant manager at Hartlepools United on wages of £24 a week. He later admitted the decision, which he took against the advice of his friends and family, was "against all logic". His successor, Alex Tait, led Burton to promotion out of the Southern League Division One in 1965–66.

=== Hartlepools United ===
"'I've been offered the managership of Hartlepools and I don't fancy it. But if you'll come, I'll consider it.' Then he banged the phone down."

— In his autobiography, Taylor recalled Clough's initial phone call in 1965, the first time the pair had spoken in four years.

Before their arrival, Hartlepools had been forced to apply for re-election to the Football League five times in the previous six years. Taylor stated that the squad were all free transfer signings and some of the players struggled with "drink, debt or abandoned wives". The two gradually turned around the club's fortunes. They started by painting Victoria Park. Taylor had little chance to show his skills in the transfer market as the club only had £7,500 to spend, £4,000 of which went on centre-half Johnny Gill. Other signings included two of Taylor's former players at Burton, defender Tony Parry and goalkeeper Les Green; Parry would go on to win the club's Player of the Year award. The pair went on to lead the club to an eighth-place finish in the Fourth Division in 1966–67 after replacing most of the playing staff, an improvement on 1965–66 when the pair had only managed an 18th-place finish. On 15 November 1966, the then chairman, Ernest Ord, who was known for playing mind games with managers, sacked Taylor saying he couldn't afford to pay him anymore. Clough refused to accept it, so Ord sacked him as well. However, there was a boardroom coup where they refused to ratify the two sackings and which instead saw Ord ousted as chairman. Both Clough and Taylor were reinstated. Clough had initially wanted to quit the club numerous times due to interference from Ord, but Taylor insisted that they stay as they could not walk out on their first job in management. After Ord resigned as chairman, Clough wanted to remain at Hartlepools, but Taylor persuaded him to take the offer to manage Derby.

=== Derby County ===
In May 1967, Clough and Taylor left Hartlepools to join Derby County after being recommended to the club by Len Shackleton. At Derby, Taylor and Clough proceeded to re-build the side, with Taylor instrumental in signing players such as Dave Mackay and Roy McFarland. Future England centre-half McFarland, who he described as an "uncut diamond" from the Third Division, was his first signing for a fee of £24,000. Other signings he initiated included winger John McGovern (whom the pair had signed at Hartlepools and would follow Clough on to Leeds and Nottingham) and full-back John Robson. After the 1967–68 season had finished with the club fifth from bottom in the Second Division, Clough and Taylor had released 16 players and numerous more staff members, including "a tea lady who laughed after a bad defeat".

Derby were promoted to the First Division in 1968–69, prompting chairman Sydney Bradley to state that "Brian and Peter built an ocean liner out of a shipwreck". Derby finished fourth in 1969–70, and then strengthened again from a player Taylor had scouted, signing midfielder Archie Gemmill from Preston North End for £64,000. Most signings involved scouting from Taylor, with the only two transfers he had played no part in being Clough's former Sunderland teammates Colin Todd and John O'Hare. Following a ninth-place finish in 1970–71, Derby went on to win the League Championship in 1971–72 – the first in the club's history. Clough and Taylor continued to strengthen the club in the transfer market however, with Taylor noting that "a manager should always be looking for signs of disintegration in a winning side and then sell the players responsible before possible buyers notice their deterioration".

Derby reached the semi-finals of the European Cup the following season, controversially losing to Juventus; Taylor had spotted Juventus player Helmut Haller talking with referee Gerhard Schulenberg at half-time and described how a "squad of heavies" restrained him after he attempted to overhear the pair's conversation. Clough went on to call the Italian team "cheating bastards". On 15 October 1973, both he and Clough resigned, partially after a dispute with the Derby board over Taylor's crucial but largely undefined role. However, numerous reasons were behind Clough and Taylor's resignation. Taylor, in particular, had been frustrated by what he felt was a lack of support from the club's directors over the pair's transfer policy. The pair had come close to leaving Derby earlier, turning down offers to manage Coventry City and the Greece national team. Fans protested against the board following their resignation, and the players also demanded they be reinstated, but chairman Sam Longson's relationship with Clough and Taylor was irreparable.

"If we had stayed, Derby County would have won the European Cup long before Nottingham Forest and would still be among the premier clubs of England. They are back in the Second Division today because a few interfering directors imagined they could run the show."

— Taylor speaking in 1980.

=== Brighton & Hove Albion ===
Clough was appointed as manager at Third Division Brighton & Hove Albion on 1 November 1973, with Taylor joining as his assistant. Just after the pair were appointed, the team lost 4–0 at home to Walton & Hersham in an FA Cup replay and then 8–2 at home to Bristol Rovers on 1 December. Brighton finished 19th in the final table in the 1973–74 season, narrowly avoiding relegation to the Fourth Division, and the pair began to rebuild the team by signing Peter Grummitt, Andy Rollings, Ian Mellor, Steve Govier and Ken Goodeve; Taylor felt that Clough never settled at Brighton however, and spent too much time away on media commitments. Clough left for Leeds United in July 1974. Still, Taylor refused to go with Clough as he felt Brighton and club chairman Mike Bamber had treated them well, and so the partnership ended after nine years as Taylor stayed at the Goldstone Ground as sole manager. He went on to sign striker Peter Ward and midfielder Brian Horton but admitted that both he and Clough were much more effective as a duo; he felt that he had struggled to make the good players he signed to play to their full potential whilst feeling that Clough had bought and sold poorly as Leeds manager. He stayed on at the South Coast club for a further two seasons, guiding the team to a fourth-place finish in 1975–76, missing promotion by two points. His successor, Alan Mullery, managed to lead the team Taylor left behind to promotion in 1976–77 and then into the top-flight in 1978–79.

=== Nottingham Forest ===
On 16 July 1976, Taylor resigned as Brighton manager and joined once again with Clough, who had by this time moved on to Taylor's hometown club Nottingham Forest after a 44-day tenure as manager of Leeds United. After assessing the players Taylor told Clough "that was a feat by you to finish eighth in the Second Division because some of them are only Third Division players". He then berated John Robertson for allowing himself to become overweight and disillusioned, and got Robertson on a diet and training regime that would help him to become a top international. He also spotted Tony Woodcock playing for the reserves and converted him from an unwanted midfielder into a striker who would win 42 caps for England. In September 1976, he bought striker Peter Withe for £43,000, and sold him on to Newcastle United for £250,000 two years later. Withe was replaced in the starting eleven by Garry Birtles, who Taylor had scouted playing for non-League Long Eaton United; Birtles would also go on to represent England. The first trophy of the Clough and Taylor reign was the 1976–77 Anglo-Scottish Cup. Forest beat Orient 5–1 on aggregate in the two-legged final played in December 1976. Clough valued winning a derided trophy as the club's first silverware since 1959, saying: "Those who said it was a nothing trophy were absolutely crackers. We'd won something, and it made all the difference."

Within a year of Taylor's arrival, Forest were promoted to the First Division after securing the third automatic promotion place in 1976–77. Taylor and Clough then decided to replace goalkeeper John Middleton with Peter Shilton, whom they purchased for £270,000; Taylor reasoned: "Shilton wins you matches." After spending some time secretly following Kenny Burns he concluded that Burns's reputation as a hard drinker and gambler was exaggerated and he sanctioned a £145,000 move for the player, who would become FWA Footballer of the Year in 1977–78 after being converted from centre-forward to a sweeper role. Clough and Taylor were appointed joint-managers of the England youth team in December 1977, but the pair resigned after less than a year in charge as Forest's success meant they struggled to make time also to coach the England players.

In their first season back in the top division, Forest won the Championship by a seven-point margin ahead of runners-up Liverpool, conceding just 24 goals in 42 league games. They won the League Cup with a 1–0 win over Liverpool in the final replay, despite Shilton, David Needham and Archie Gemmill all being ineligible to play as they were cup-tied. In February 1979, Taylor authorised the English game's first £1 million transfer when Forest purchased Trevor Francis from Birmingham City. Taylor later reported that Clough had been holding out for a fee of £925,000 until Taylor rang Birmingham to confirm the deal at £1 million before ringing Clough to say, "We've got Francis, I've just paid their price"; Clough replied simply by saying "Good", and then put down the phone.

Forest started the 1978–79 season by beating Ipswich Town 5–0 for a Charity Shield record win. On 9 December 1978, Liverpool ended Forest's 42 match unbeaten league run dating back to the November the year before. The unbeaten run was the equivalent of a whole season, surpassing the previous record of 35 games held by Burnley in 1920–21. At the end of the season Forest won the European Cup with a 1–0 victory over Malmö FF at the Olympiastadion. They also won the League Cup again after beating Southampton 3–2; Taylor led the team out at Wembley as Clough felt it was Taylor's turn – they always wanted to lead their team out together but were always denied permission by Football League chairman Alan Hardaker. After this success Forest bought Asa Hartford and Frank Gray, though Hartford was sold on after two months after Taylor realised his limited passing range did not fit Forest's style of play. Forest were denied a third consecutive League Cup win in 1980 after a defeat in the final by Wolverhampton Wanderers.

The European Cup was retained in 1980, this time against Kevin Keegan's Hamburger SV at the Santiago Bernabéu Stadium. Clough and Taylor then began the process of breaking up the championship winning team, selling off Martin O'Neill, Ian Bowyer, Garry Birtles, and Larry Lloyd; as a new team was built based around youngsters such as Gary Mills, Stuart Gray, Colin Walsh, and Bryn Gunn. New signings included striker Ian Wallace and Switzerland international Raimondo Ponte. Taylor retired in May 1982 after Forest finished 12th in the league, with recent signings Justin Fashanu and Raimondo Ponte proving to be unsuccessful. Clough would stay at Forest for another 11 seasons, but without Taylor would only add two League Cups and two Full Members Cups to the club's trophy cabinet, and would struggle against alcoholism.

=== Return to Derby County ===
Taylor took over as manager of Derby County in November 1982, to the great surprise of most people in the game. He brought in Roy McFarland as his assistant and signed Archie Gemmill and Bobby Davison. At the time, Derby were going through serious financial problems and were at the bottom of the table, but he steered them to a mid-table position by the end of the season with a 15-match unbeaten run. In the third round of the FA Cup on 8 January 1983 they knocked out Clough's Forest team with a 2–0 win at the Baseball Ground. They reached the fifth round, where they were knocked out by Manchester United.

However, the following season saw the team struggle again. Taylor resigned in early April 1984, with the club third from bottom of the Second Division before Derby were relegated. However, the team did manage to reach the quarter-finals of the FA Cup, and the revenue obtained from the cup run helped to keep the club afloat.

== Relationship with Clough ==
Clough said, "I'm not equipped to manage successfully without Peter Taylor. I am the shop window and he is the goods in the back." The two worked as a pair by complementing each other's strengths, as Clough had a forceful personality and was adept at motivating players, whilst Taylor was more reserved. However, he could spot talented players. Former Hartlepools player Cliff Wright described the pair as "good cop, bad cop. Cloughie would knock you to the ground, verbally at least, and Pete would pick you up and put you back together." As the bigger personality and the man with the title of manager, Clough garnered much greater publicity than Taylor, which caused Taylor to grumble that "I sometimes wonder why he never says to Bell's whisky, for instance, when they're handing out Manager of the Month awards, 'You'll have to present an extra gallon bottle. There are two of us." On a personal level, they were very close and often finished each other's sentences.

Though Taylor's friendship and partnership with Clough had been strong, their relationship sometimes became strained. While at Derby in 1971, Taylor was riled when he learned that Clough had failed to disclose to him that he had received a pay rise of £5,000 from chairman Sam Longson. He was also annoyed that Clough was often away earning extra money from media work while he was left to do a larger share of the work with the players. The relationship worsened in the autumn of 1980 when Taylor published With Clough, by Taylor, an autobiography which was largely based on Taylor's work with Clough. Taylor had not told Clough he was writing the book and did not give him a share of the proceeds. In February 1972 Taylor was approached by and received an offer from Frank O'Farrell to be his number two at Manchester United. The United board rejected the offer because of apparent fear from Busby about Clough mounting a campaign against the club in the media.

Although they initially parted on good terms when Taylor retired in May 1982 and spent time together that summer in Cala Millor the relationship was severely strained when Taylor became manager of Derby County in November 1982, and finally damaged permanently after a dispute over the transfer in May 1983 of John Robertson from Forest to Derby, where Taylor was now managing. Clough was angered that Taylor did not inform him about the deal. Clough attacked Taylor in a tabloid article on 3 July 1983 as being a "rattlesnake", "a snake-in-the-grass" and said that "We pass each other on the A52 going to work on most days of the week. But if his car broke down and I saw him thumbing a lift, I wouldn't pick him up, I'd run him over". The two men would never speak to one another again. Shortly before his death, he did scouting work for Leicester City.

== Death ==
On 4 October 1990, Peter Taylor died suddenly of pulmonary fibrosis while on holiday in Costa De Los Pinos, Mallorca, at the age of 62. When told of Taylor's death by Ron Fenton, Clough did not speak and put the phone down on him. While deeply upset, he also made a phone call to the Taylor family. Clough, along with the rest of his family, attended the funeral 11 days later at St Peter's Church, Widmerpool as did around 250 people, including Colin Todd, David Nish, Roy McFarland, Larry Lloyd, Alan Durban, Jimmy Gordon, Nigel Clough, Arthur Cox, Frank Clark, David Pleat, Jimmy Sirrel, Kevin Hector, Peter Withe and Archie Gemmill. Clough dedicated his 1994 autobiography to Taylor, saying, "To Peter. Still miss you badly. You once said: 'When you get shot of me there won't be as much laughter in your life'. You were right."

== Career statistics ==
=== Playing statistics ===
Appearances and goals by club, season and competition
Club	Season	League			FA Cup		Total	
Club	Season	Division	Apps	Goals	Apps	Goals	Apps	Goals
Coventry City	1950–51	Second Division	1	0	0	0	1	0
Coventry City	1951–52	Second Division	26	0	3	0	29	0
Coventry City	1952–53	Third Division South	8	0	0	0	8	0
Coventry City	1953–54	Third Division South	41	0	1	0	42	0
Coventry City	1954–55	Third Division South	10	0	0	0	10	0
Coventry City	Total		86	0	4	0	90	0
Middlesbrough	1955–56	Second Division	6	0	0	0	6	0
Middlesbrough	1956–57	Second Division	38	0	3	0	41	0
Middlesbrough	1957–58	Second Division	32	0	2	0	34	0
Middlesbrough	1958–59	Second Division	30	0	0	0	30	0
Middlesbrough	1959–60	Second Division	34	0	4	0	38	0
Middlesbrough	Total		140	0	9	0	149	0
Port Vale	1961–62	Third Division	1	0	0	0	1	0
Career total			227	0	13	0	240	0

=== Managerial statistics ===
Managerial record by team and tenure
Team	From	To	Record				
Team	From	To	P	W	D	L	Win %
Brighton & Hove Albion	20 July 1974	16 July 1976	104	42	23	39	40.4
Derby County	8 November 1982	4 April 1984	77	23	23	31	29.9
Total			181	65	46	70	35.9

== Honours ==
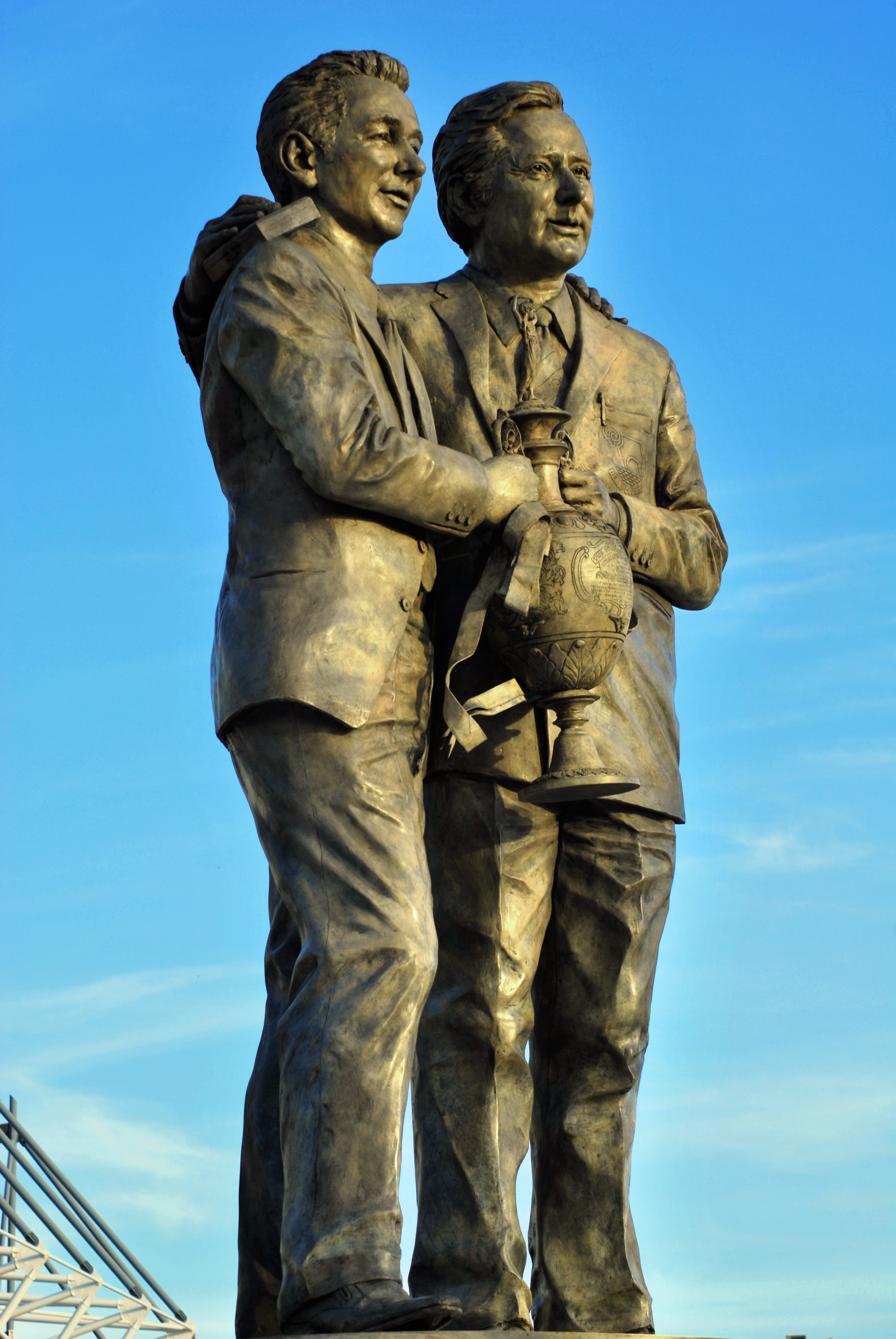
The Brian Clough and Peter Taylor Statue at Pride Park Stadium.

Burton Albion

- Southern League Cup: 1964

Derby County (with Clough)

- Football League Second Division: 1968–69
- Football League First Division: 1971–72

Nottingham Forest (with Clough)

- Football League Second Division third-place promotion: 1976–77
- Anglo-Scottish Cup: 1976–77
- Football League First Division: 1977–78
- League Cup: 1978, 1979
- FA Charity Shield: 1978
- European Cup: 1979, 1980
- European Super Cup: 1979

=== Legacy ===
Clough paid tribute to Taylor when he was awarded the freedom of the city of Nottingham in March 1993, saying that "I have only one regret today, and that is that me mate isn't here with me". Taylor was portrayed by Timothy Spall in The Damned United, a film released in 2009 based on Clough's ill-fated spell at Leeds United. In August 2010, Derby County unveiled a statue of Clough and Taylor at Pride Park Stadium. In September 2015, Nottingham Forest announced that the Main Stand at the City Ground would be renamed the Peter Taylor Stand as part of the club's 150th anniversary celebrations.
