= Ronnie Dicks =

English footballer (1924–2004)

Personal information
- Full name: Ronald William Dicks
- Date of birth: 13 April 1924
- Place of birth: Kennington, London, England
- Date of death: 30 January 2004 (aged 79)
- Place of death: Middlesbrough, England
- Position: Wing half

Senior career*
Years	Team	Apps	(Gls)
- Dulwich Hamlet
1943–1958	Middlesbrough	316	(10)
Total		316+	(10+)
- * Club domestic league appearances and goals

Ronald William Dicks (13 April 1924 – 30 January 2004) was an English professional footballer who played primarily as a wing half. He spent his entire professional career with Middlesbrough, where he made 316 Football League appearances.

== Career ==
Dicks was born in Kennington, London. Having previously played as an amateur for Dulwich Hamlet, Dicks signed as an amateur for Middlesbrough in April 1943, as he was performing military service in the Royal Artillery nearby at Marske Aerodrome, and signed a professional contract shortly after. He played wartime football for Middlesbrough and was then stationed in Burma following the end of the Second World War.

After his return from military service, he made his league debut for Middlesbrough in August 1947. He made 316 league appearances between then and his retirement in 1958, playing largely at wing half but also acting as a utility player.

== After football ==
Following his retirement in 1958, he continued to live in Middlesbrough. He set up a furniture company and later worked in a sports shop.

== Personal life ==
He was the older brother of fellow footballer and football manager Alan Dicks, who played for Chelsea and Southend United, and managed Bristol City, amongst others.

He died on 30 January 2004, in James Cook University Hospital in Middlesbrough, having outlived his wife Margaret.

== Career statistics ==
Appearances and goals by club, season and competition
Club	Season	League			FA Cup		Total	
Club	Season	Division	Apps	Goals	Apps	Goals	Apps	Goals
Middlesbrough	1947–48	First Division	22	2	1	0	23	2
Middlesbrough	1948–49	First Division	19	2	0	0	19	2
Middlesbrough	1949–50	First Division	22	0	4	0	26	0
Middlesbrough	1950–51	First Division	35	1	1	0	36	1
Middlesbrough	1951–52	First Division	27	0	3	0	30	0
Middlesbrough	1952–53	First Division	10	0	1	0	11	0
Middlesbrough	1953–54	First Division	32	0	2	0	34	0
Middlesbrough	1954–55	Second Division	39	2	1	0	40	2
Middlesbrough	1955–56	Second Division	36	0	2	0	38	0
Middlesbrough	1956–57	Second Division	41	2	3	0	44	2
Middlesbrough	1957–58	Second Division	25	1	0	0	25	1
Middlesbrough	1958–59	Second Division	8	0	0	0	8	0
Career total			316	10	18	0	334	10
