= 1955–56 Football League =

57th season of the Football League

The Football League
- Season: 1955–56
- Champions: Manchester United

The 1955–56 season was the 57th completed season of The Football League. Both major football honours went to Manchester this year, with United winning the First Division title and City bringing home the FA Cup.

== Final league tables ==
Beginning with the season 1894–95, clubs finishing level on points were separated according to goal average (goals scored divided by goals conceded), or more properly put, goal ratio. In case one or more teams had the same goal difference, this system favoured those teams who had scored fewer goals. The goal average system was eventually scrapped beginning with the 1976–77 season.

From the 1922–23 season, the bottom two teams of both Third Division North and Third Division South were required to apply for re-election.

== First Division ==
First Division
- Season: 1955–56
- Champions: Manchester United; 4th English title
- Relegated: Huddersfield Town; Sheffield United
- European Cup: Manchester United
- Matches: 462
- Goals: 1,529 (3.31 per match)
- Top goalscorer: Nat Lofthouse; 32
- Biggest home win: Luton Town 8–2 Sunderland (19 November 1955); Bolton Wanderers 6–0 Birmingham City (10 December 1955); Blackpool 6–0 Aston Villa (14 January 1956)
- Biggest away win: Cardiff City 1–9 Wolverhampton Wanderers (3 September 1955)
- Highest scoring: Blackpool 7–3 Sunderland (3 September 1955); Cardiff City 1–9 Wolverhampton Wanderers (3 September 1955); Luton Town 8–2 Sunderland (19 November 1955)

Pos	Team	Pld	W	D	L	GF	GA	GAv	Pts	Qualification or relegation
1	Manchester United (C)	42	25	10	7	83	51	1.627	60	Qualification for the European Cup preliminary round
2	Blackpool	42	20	9	13	86	62	1.387	49	
3	Wolverhampton Wanderers	42	20	9	13	89	65	1.369	49	
4	Manchester City	42	18	10	14	82	69	1.188	46	
5	Arsenal	42	18	10	14	60	61	0.984	46	
6	Birmingham City	42	18	9	15	75	57	1.316	45	
7	Burnley	42	18	8	16	64	54	1.185	44	
8	Bolton Wanderers	42	18	7	17	71	58	1.224	43	
9	Sunderland	42	17	9	16	80	95	0.842	43	
10	Luton Town	42	17	8	17	66	64	1.031	42	
11	Newcastle United	42	17	7	18	85	70	1.214	41	
12	Portsmouth	42	16	9	17	78	85	0.918	41	
13	West Bromwich Albion	42	18	5	19	58	70	0.829	41	
14	Charlton Athletic	42	17	6	19	75	81	0.926	40	
15	Everton	42	15	10	17	55	69	0.797	40	
16	Chelsea	42	14	11	17	64	77	0.831	39	
17	Cardiff City	42	15	9	18	55	69	0.797	39	
18	Tottenham Hotspur	42	15	7	20	61	71	0.859	37	
19	Preston North End	42	14	8	20	73	72	1.014	36	
20	Aston Villa	42	11	13	18	52	69	0.754	35	
21	Huddersfield Town (R)	42	14	7	21	54	83	0.651	35	Relegation to the Second Division
22	Sheffield United (R)	42	12	9	21	63	77	0.818	33	Relegation to the Second Division

Source: World Football
Rules for classification: 1) Points; 2) Goal average; 3) Goals scored
(C) Champions; (R) Relegated

=== Results ===
Home \ Away	ARS	AST	BIR	BLP	BOL	BUR	CAR	CHA	CHE	EVE	HUD	LUT	MCI	MUN	NEW	POR	PNE	SHU	SUN	TOT	WBA	WOL
Arsenal		1–0	1–0	4–1	3–1	0–1	3–1	2–4	1–1	3–2	2–0	3–0	0–0	1–1	1–0	1–3	3–2	2–1	3–1	0–1	2–0	2–2
Aston Villa	1–1		0–0	1–1	0–2	2–0	2–0	1–1	1–4	2–0	3–0	1–0	0–3	4–4	3–0	1–3	3–2	3–2	1–4	0–2	3–0	0–0
Birmingham City	4–0	2–2		1–2	5–2	1–2	2–1	4–0	3–0	6–2	5–0	0–0	4–3	2–2	3–1	3–2	0–3	0–2	1–2	3–0	2–0	0–0
Blackpool	3–1	6–0	2–0		0–0	1–1	2–1	5–0	2–1	4–0	4–2	3–2	0–1	0–0	5–1	2–3	2–6	1–1	7–3	0–2	5–1	2–1
Bolton Wanderers	4–1	1–0	6–0	1–3		0–1	4–0	1–3	4–0	1–1	2–2	4–0	1–3	3–1	3–2	4–0	0–0	2–1	0–3	3–2	4–0	2–1
Burnley	0–1	2–0	3–2	0–2	2–0		0–2	2–1	5–0	0–1	2–0	3–1	2–2	0–0	3–1	3–0	1–2	1–1	4–0	2–0	1–2	1–2
Cardiff City	1–2	1–0	2–1	1–0	1–0	2–2		3–1	1–1	3–1	1–2	2–0	4–1	0–1	1–1	2–3	3–1	3–2	3–1	0–0	1–3	1–9
Charlton Athletic	2–0	3–1	2–0	1–2	3–1	2–1	0–0		1–2	0–2	4–1	2–2	5–2	3–0	0–2	6–1	2–1	3–2	2–1	1–2	5–1	0–2
Chelsea	2–0	0–0	1–2	2–1	0–2	0–0	2–1	3–1		6–1	0–0	0–0	2–1	2–4	2–1	1–5	0–1	1–0	2–3	2–0	2–0	2–3
Everton	1–1	2–1	5–1	1–0	1–0	1–1	2–0	3–2	3–3		5–2	0–1	1–1	4–2	0–0	0–2	0–4	1–4	1–2	2–1	2–0	2–1
Huddersfield Town	0–1	1–1	1–1	3–1	3–1	1–0	1–2	4–0	1–3	1–0		0–2	3–3	0–2	2–6	1–0	2–2	1–2	4–0	1–0	1–0	1–3
Luton Town	0–0	2–1	0–1	3–1	0–0	2–3	3–0	2–1	2–2	2–2	1–2		3–2	0–2	4–2	1–0	2–1	2–1	8–2	2–1	0–2	5–1
Manchester City	2–2	2–2	1–1	2–0	2–0	1–3	3–1	0–2	2–2	3–0	1–0	3–2		1–0	1–2	4–1	0–2	3–1	4–2	1–2	2–0	2–2
Manchester United	1–1	1–0	2–1	2–1	1–0	2–0	1–1	5–1	3–0	2–1	3–0	3–1	2–1		5–2	1–0	3–2	3–1	2–1	2–2	3–1	4–3
Newcastle United	2–0	2–3	2–2	1–2	3–0	3–1	4–0	4–1	1–1	1–2	1–1	4–0	3–1	0–0		2–1	5–0	4–2	3–1	1–2	0–3	3–1
Portsmouth	5–2	2–2	0–5	3–3	3–3	3–1	1–1	4–0	4–4	1–0	5–2	0–0	2–4	3–2	0–2		0–2	1–1	2–1	4–1	1–1	2–1
Preston North End	0–1	0–1	1–1	3–3	0–1	4–2	1–2	2–2	2–3	0–1	1–2	2–1	0–3	3–1	4–3	2–1		0–2	2–2	3–3	0–1	2–0
Sheffield United	0–2	2–2	0–3	2–1	1–3	1–2	2–1	0–0	2–1	1–1	3–1	0–4	1–1	1–0	2–1	1–3	3–1		2–3	2–0	2–2	3–3
Sunderland	3–1	5–1	1–0	0–0	0–0	4–4	1–1	3–2	4–3	0–0	4–1	1–2	0–3	2–2	1–6	4–2	2–2	3–2		3–2	2–1	1–1
Tottenham Hotspur	3–1	4–3	0–1	1–1	0–3	0–1	1–1	2–3	4–0	1–1	1–2	2–1	2–1	1–2	3–1	1–1	0–4	3–1	2–3		4–1	2–1
West Bromwich Albion	2–1	1–0	0–2	1–2	2–0	1–0	2–1	3–3	3–0	2–0	1–2	3–1	0–4	1–4	1–1	4–0	3–2	2–1	3–0	1–0		1–1
Wolverhampton Wanderers	3–3	0–0	1–0	2–3	4–2	3–1	0–2	2–0	2–1	1–0	4–0	1–2	7–2	0–2	2–1	3–1	2–1	3–2	3–1	5–1	3–2	

Updated to match(es) played on unknown. Source: Ian Laschke: Rothmans Book of Football League Records 1888–89 to 1978–79. Macdonald and Jane’s, London & Sydney, 1980.
Legend: Blue = home team win; Yellow = draw; Red = away team win.

=== Maps ===
Locations of the Football League First Division London teams 1955–1956
Locations of the Football League First Division 1955–1956 teams

== Second Division ==
Second Division
- Season: 1955–56
- Champions: Sheffield Wednesday
- Promoted: Sheffield Wednesday; Leeds United
- Relegated: Plymouth Argyle; Hull City
- Matches: 462
- Goals: 1,628 (3.52 per match)
- Top goalscorer: Willie Gardiner (34 goals)

Pos	Team	Pld	W	D	L	GF	GA	GAv	Pts	Qualification or relegation
1	Sheffield Wednesday (C, P)	42	21	13	8	101	62	1.629	55	Promotion to the First Division
2	Leeds United (P)	42	23	6	13	80	60	1.333	52	Promotion to the First Division
3	Liverpool	42	21	6	15	85	63	1.349	48	
4	Blackburn Rovers	42	21	6	15	84	65	1.292	48	
5	Leicester City	42	21	6	15	94	78	1.205	48	
6	Bristol Rovers	42	21	6	15	84	70	1.200	48	
7	Nottingham Forest	42	19	9	14	68	63	1.079	47	
8	Lincoln City	42	18	10	14	79	65	1.215	46	
9	Fulham	42	20	6	16	89	79	1.127	46	
10	Swansea Town	42	20	6	16	83	81	1.025	46	
11	Bristol City	42	19	7	16	80	64	1.250	45	
12	Port Vale	42	16	13	13	60	58	1.034	45	
13	Stoke City	42	20	4	18	71	62	1.145	44	
14	Middlesbrough	42	16	8	18	76	78	0.974	40	
15	Bury	42	16	8	18	86	90	0.956	40	
16	West Ham United	42	14	11	17	74	69	1.072	39	
17	Doncaster Rovers	42	12	11	19	69	96	0.719	35	
18	Barnsley	42	11	12	19	47	84	0.560	34	
19	Rotherham United	42	12	9	21	56	75	0.747	33	
20	Notts County	42	11	9	22	55	82	0.671	31	
21	Plymouth Argyle (R)	42	10	8	24	54	87	0.621	28	Relegation to the Third Division South
22	Hull City (R)	42	10	6	26	53	97	0.546	26	Relegation to the Third Division North

Rules for classification: 1) Points; 2) Goal average; 3) Goals scored
(C) Champions; (P) Promoted; (R) Relegated

=== Results ===
Home \ Away	BAR	BLB	BRI	BRR	BRY	DON	FUL	HUL	LEE	LEI	LIN	LIV	MID	NOT	NTC	PLY	PTV	ROT	SHW	STK	SWA	WHU
Barnsley		2–1	0–0	4–3	3–3	2–2	3–0	2–1	2–1	0–1	1–0	0–5	0–4	1–1	3–1	1–2	1–2	3–2	0–3	1–0	3–2	1–1
Blackburn Rovers	5–1		4–6	2–0	3–1	1–1	1–0	2–0	2–3	2–3	0–2	3–3	2–1	2–2	2–0	2–1	7–1	3–1	2–2	3–0	3–0	4–1
Bristol City	2–0	2–0		1–1	3–1	4–1	2–1	5–2	0–1	1–1	5–1	2–1	2–0	0–0	1–3	6–0	0–0	5–2	3–2	0–1	2–1	3–1
Bristol Rovers	1–1	1–0	0–3		4–2	4–2	2–2	4–2	4–1	2–1	3–0	1–2	7–2	4–1	2–0	2–1	1–2	1–4	4–2	4–2	1–2	1–1
Bury	3–0	0–4	1–1	0–1		5–1	1–5	3–2	1–0	3–1	3–3	1–4	1–1	1–2	4–0	7–1	2–2	2–1	2–5	1–0	2–4	1–1
Doncaster Rovers	1–1	2–2	3–2	2–1	2–3		4–2	3–0	1–2	6–2	2–0	1–0	0–1	1–3	1–1	3–1	3–0	1–1	2–2	2–4	3–1	2–1
Fulham	5–1	3–0	3–0	3–5	3–1	4–0		5–0	1–2	3–2	3–0	3–1	4–1	4–3	1–1	2–1	1–4	1–1	1–2	2–0	4–1	3–1
Hull City	4–1	0–3	1–3	1–2	2–3	1–1	2–2		1–4	2–4	2–1	1–2	2–2	0–3	2–0	0–1	2–1	0–3	2–2	3–2	1–4	3–1
Leeds United	3–1	1–2	2–1	2–1	1–0	3–0	6–1	1–0		4–0	1–0	4–2	2–0	3–0	1–0	4–2	1–1	4–1	2–1	1–0	2–2	3–3
Leicester City	0–0	0–2	2–2	4–2	5–0	3–0	2–1	1–2	5–2		4–0	3–1	1–1	5–2	4–0	5–1	4–1	3–1	1–2	3–1	6–1	2–1
Lincoln City	4–0	3–0	2–0	2–0	4–2	1–1	6–1	2–0	1–1	7–1		2–0	1–2	1–3	2–0	1–0	1–0	1–1	2–2	2–1	3–1	1–1
Liverpool	1–1	1–2	2–1	0–2	4–2	1–2	7–0	3–0	1–0	3–1	2–1		1–1	5–2	2–1	4–1	4–1	2–0	0–3	2–2	4–1	3–1
Middlesbrough	1–1	1–0	2–1	0–1	1–3	4–1	1–1	5–1	5–3	4–3	4–2	1–2		3–2	3–0	1–2	1–1	0–1	2–2	1–3	4–1	2–0
Nottingham Forest	1–0	1–1	0–2	1–1	0–2	5–0	1–0	2–1	2–0	2–0	2–2	1–3	2–4		0–2	3–1	2–2	1–0	0–1	2–3	2–1	0–0
Notts County	2–2	1–2	3–2	5–2	2–1	3–2	3–4	0–2	2–1	1–1	2–2	2–1	5–0	1–3		3–0	0–0	1–2	1–1	1–3	1–5	0–1
Plymouth Argyle	3–0	1–0	5–0	0–1	1–4	2–2	0–0	1–1	4–3	0–1	1–4	4–0	4–0	1–2	1–1		1–1	3–1	1–1	0–1	0–1	0–1
Port Vale	1–2	4–1	2–0	1–1	1–1	2–0	2–1	0–1	2–0	2–3	1–1	1–1	3–2	0–2	3–1	3–1		4–1	0–1	1–0	3–0	2–1
Rotherham United	0–0	3–2	1–3	1–0	1–3	3–3	2–3	0–2	0–2	3–1	2–2	0–1	2–1	2–1	1–1	0–0	1–0		2–3	0–1	2–3	3–2
Sheffield Wednesday	3–0	5–1	2–1	4–2	3–3	5–2	2–3	4–1	4–0	1–1	5–3	1–1	3–1	1–2	1–0	5–2	4–0	0–2		4–0	2–2	1–1
Stoke City	2–1	1–2	4–2	1–2	0–2	5–2	1–2	4–1	2–1	2–0	3–0	3–2	2–5	1–1	0–2	4–1	1–1	1–0	2–0		5–0	3–0
Swansea Town	3–1	2–1	2–1	1–2	5–3	2–0	2–0	4–1	1–1	6–1	0–2	2–1	2–1	0–1	5–1	2–2	0–0	4–1	2–1	0–0		4–2
West Ham United	4–0	2–3	3–0	2–1	3–2	6–1	2–1	1–1	1–1	1–3	2–4	2–0	1–0	1–2	6–1	4–0	0–2	1–1	3–3	2–0	5–1	

Updated to match(es) played on unknown. Source: Ian Laschke: Rothmans Book of Football League Records 1888–89 to 1978–79. Macdonald and Jane’s, London & Sydney, 1980.
Legend: Blue = home team win; Yellow = draw; Red = away team win.

=== Maps ===
Locations of the Football League Second Division 1955–1956 teams

== Third Division North ==
Football League Third Division North
- Season: 1955–56
- Champions: Grimsby Town (2nd title)
- Failed re-election: none
- Matches: 552
- Goals: 1,771 (3.21 per match)
- Top goalscorer: Bob Crosbie (Grimsby Town), 36

Pos	Team	Pld	W	D	L	GF	GA	GAv	Pts	Promotion or relegation
1	Grimsby Town (C, P)	46	31	6	9	76	29	2.621	68	Promotion to the Second Division
2	Derby County	46	28	7	11	110	55	2.000	63	
3	Accrington Stanley	46	25	9	12	92	57	1.614	59	
4	Hartlepools United	46	26	5	15	81	60	1.350	57	
5	Southport	46	23	11	12	66	53	1.245	57	
6	Chesterfield	46	25	4	17	94	66	1.424	54	
7	Stockport County	46	21	9	16	90	61	1.475	51	
8	Bradford City	46	18	13	15	78	64	1.219	49	
9	Scunthorpe & Lindsey United	46	20	8	18	75	63	1.190	48	
10	Workington	46	19	9	18	75	63	1.190	47	
11	York City	46	19	9	18	85	72	1.181	47	
12	Rochdale	46	17	13	16	66	84	0.786	47	
13	Gateshead	46	17	11	18	77	84	0.917	45	
14	Wrexham	46	16	10	20	66	73	0.904	42	
15	Darlington	46	16	9	21	60	73	0.822	41	
16	Tranmere Rovers	46	16	9	21	59	84	0.702	41	
17	Chester	46	13	14	19	52	82	0.634	40	
18	Mansfield Town	46	14	11	21	84	81	1.037	39	
19	Halifax Town	46	14	11	21	66	76	0.868	39	
20	Oldham Athletic	46	10	18	18	76	86	0.884	38	
21	Carlisle United	46	15	8	23	71	95	0.747	38	
22	Barrow	46	12	9	25	61	83	0.735	33	
23	Bradford (Park Avenue)	46	13	7	26	61	122	0.500	33	Re-elected
24	Crewe Alexandra	46	9	10	27	50	105	0.476	28	Re-elected

Source: rsssf.com
(C) Champions; (P) Promoted

=== Results ===
Home \ Away	ACC	BRW	BRA	BPA	CRL	CHE	CHF	CRE	DAR	DER	GAT	GRI	HAL	HAR	MAN	OLD	ROC	SCU	SOU	STP	TRA	WRK	WRE	YOR
Accrington Stanley		2–0	2–0	7–0	1–0	4–0	5–1	5–1	2–1	2–0	2–2	0–1	2–2	1–0	3–1	2–2	3–0	2–0	4–2	3–1	0–0	5–1	3–1	1–3
Barrow	3–1		3–1	2–2	0–0	1–2	3–1	5–0	0–1	1–2	4–0	0–0	2–2	3–2	4–1	4–1	2–0	2–2	0–2	2–0	1–1	2–0	0–3	0–1
Bradford City	2–1	1–1		5–0	0–0	1–1	3–5	3–1	3–0	2–1	3–1	0–2	2–0	2–0	4–2	0–0	2–2	4–3	2–0	4–1	5–0	2–0	4–3	3–1
Bradford Park Avenue	1–0	3–2	1–1		2–1	1–1	0–5	2–0	3–0	2–4	3–1	2–1	1–1	1–3	0–3	4–1	3–3	2–0	0–3	2–0	4–5	4–0	4–2	2–1
Carlisle United	0–4	2–0	0–0	4–1		4–1	1–1	4–1	2–0	0–3	2–1	1–2	2–2	0–3	5–2	3–1	1–2	1–2	4–0	4–1	0–3	2–4	0–1	3–1
Chester	1–1	1–0	1–1	0–0	3–3		2–1	0–0	2–1	2–5	3–0	2–0	1–0	0–1	4–3	3–2	0–0	3–5	1–3	1–4	0–0	1–0	2–1	2–2
Chesterfield	0–1	2–0	1–1	5–1	2–1	2–1		8–0	2–1	2–0	3–0	1–0	3–0	2–3	2–1	1–0	7–2	2–0	5–1	2–3	2–0	2–4	2–0	3–1
Crewe Alexandra	0–3	0–1	1–4	4–2	3–1	0–0	0–3		1–1	2–1	1–0	0–0	1–4	1–3	2–1	1–2	2–0	1–2	1–1	3–1	4–0	2–1	1–2	1–2
Darlington	2–0	4–2	1–1	4–1	3–5	0–1	2–1	4–1		1–0	0–0	0–1	1–2	0–0	3–1	2–1	2–0	1–0	0–1	0–0	6–2	2–2	2–2	1–4
Derby County	6–2	2–1	4–1	4–0	3–0	3–1	3–0	3–3	6–2		4–1	1–3	4–1	3–2	4–0	2–0	2–0	2–2	2–0	2–0	0–0	2–2	2–0	3–2
Gateshead	4–0	3–2	4–1	3–0	2–3	1–1	3–3	4–1	0–1	2–4		2–0	1–1	2–1	3–0	1–3	4–1	1–0	2–0	2–1	3–3	4–3	2–1	3–2
Grimsby Town	3–0	3–0	2–0	2–0	1–0	6–1	3–0	5–1	1–0	2–1	3–1		4–0	1–0	2–0	5–1	1–1	0–1	2–0	3–0	1–0	1–2	1–0	2–1
Halifax Town	2–0	1–0	3–2	6–0	2–2	0–1	3–0	2–0	3–0	2–2	3–3	0–1		0–2	1–1	5–1	1–1	0–3	0–1	1–0	0–2	2–0	1–1	2–4
Hartlepools United	0–0	1–0	1–0	3–1	3–0	3–1	3–0	6–1	3–0	2–0	3–1	1–2	3–2		4–2	1–0	1–0	0–2	1–0	0–0	4–0	1–0	3–2	0–1
Mansfield Town	3–2	4–0	0–0	5–0	0–1	3–0	0–1	1–1	3–3	1–1	3–1	0–2	3–1	5–1		2–0	6–0	3–2	0–1	2–2	6–0	0–0	6–1	3–1
Oldham Athletic	1–3	6–1	1–1	5–1	2–2	4–1	2–2	1–1	3–3	1–1	1–2	1–1	1–3	3–2	1–1		2–2	2–1	1–1	3–2	4–1	0–1	1–1	2–2
Rochdale	1–1	5–1	3–1	4–2	5–2	4–2	1–5	1–0	1–0	0–5	1–1	2–0	2–1	1–4	1–1	4–4		3–2	1–3	0–0	1–3	1–0	1–0	3–1
Scunthorpe & Lindsey United	2–3	2–0	2–0	4–2	4–0	2–1	2–0	1–1	0–1	0–2	1–1	0–1	1–0	5–1	3–0	2–1	1–2		0–1	1–5	2–1	3–1	1–1	1–1
Southport	1–1	2–1	3–1	3–0	3–0	1–0	1–0	5–0	0–1	2–5	2–0	2–0	2–0	0–0	1–1	1–1	2–0	2–2		1–1	1–0	0–0	1–1	3–3
Stockport County	1–2	4–1	1–0	0–0	8–1	2–1	2–1	2–1	2–1	2–1	1–2	0–0	3–1	4–0	7–2	0–0	0–0	3–2	4–0		7–0	4–5	4–0	4–1
Tranmere Rovers	4–1	1–1	1–1	4–1	0–1	4–0	0–1	2–1	0–1	0–1	1–1	0–1	2–1	2–2	1–0	0–3	2–1	2–1	1–2	2–1		2–0	0–2	2–1
Workington	0–0	6–1	2–1	4–0	4–0	0–0	0–1	1–0	2–0	0–3	6–1	0–0	2–0	5–1	2–1	4–3	0–1	1–2	2–3	0–1	3–0		3–1	0–0
Wrexham	1–4	0–0	2–1	1–0	5–2	0–0	3–0	4–2	2–1	3–1	1–1	1–0	1–2	1–3	2–0	1–1	0–0	0–1	2–1	0–1	3–1	0–1		4–5
York City	0–1	3–2	0–2	5–0	3–1	3–0	3–1	1–1	4–0	1–0	1–0	3–4	5–0	3–0	1–1	2–0	1–2	0–0	0–1	1–0	2–4	1–1	1–3	

Updated to match(es) played on unknown. Source: Ian Laschke: Rothmans Book of Football League Records 1888–89 to 1978–79. Macdonald and Jane’s, London & Sydney, 1980.
Legend: Blue = home team win; Yellow = draw; Red = away team win.

=== Maps ===
Locations of the Football League Third Division North teams 1955–1956

== Third Division South ==
Football League Third Division South
- Season: 1955–56
- Champions: Leyton Orient (1st title)
- Failed re-election: none
- Matches: 552
- Goals: 1,772 (3.21 per match)
- Top goalscorer: Sammy Collins (Torquay United), 40

Pos	Team	Pld	W	D	L	GF	GA	GAv	Pts	Promotion or relegation
1	Leyton Orient (C, P)	46	29	8	9	106	49	2.163	66	Promotion to the Second Division
2	Brighton & Hove Albion	46	29	7	10	112	50	2.240	65	
3	Ipswich Town	46	25	14	7	106	60	1.767	64	
4	Southend United	46	21	11	14	88	80	1.100	53	
5	Torquay United	46	20	12	14	86	63	1.365	52	
6	Brentford	46	19	14	13	69	66	1.045	52	
7	Norwich City	46	19	13	14	86	82	1.049	51	
8	Coventry City	46	20	9	17	73	60	1.217	49	
9	Bournemouth & Boscombe Athletic	46	19	10	17	63	51	1.235	48	
10	Gillingham	46	19	10	17	69	71	0.972	48	
11	Northampton Town	46	20	7	19	67	71	0.944	47	
12	Colchester United	46	18	11	17	76	81	0.938	47	
13	Shrewsbury Town	46	17	12	17	69	66	1.045	46	
14	Southampton	46	18	8	20	91	81	1.123	44	
15	Aldershot	46	12	16	18	70	90	0.778	40	
16	Exeter City	46	15	10	21	58	77	0.753	40	
17	Reading	46	15	9	22	70	79	0.886	39	
18	Queens Park Rangers	46	14	11	21	64	86	0.744	39	
19	Newport County	46	15	9	22	58	79	0.734	39	
20	Walsall	46	15	8	23	68	84	0.810	38	
21	Watford	46	13	11	22	52	85	0.612	37	
22	Millwall	46	15	6	25	83	100	0.830	36	
23	Crystal Palace	46	12	10	24	54	83	0.651	34	Re-elected
24	Swindon Town	46	8	14	24	34	78	0.436	30	Re-elected

(C) Champions; (P) Promoted

=== Results ===
Home \ Away	ALD	B&BA	BRE	B&HA	COL	COV	CRY	EXE	GIL	IPS	LEY	MIL	NPC	NOR	NWC	QPR	REA	SHR	SOU	STD	SWI	TOR	WAL	WAT
Aldershot		1–3	4–1	0–3	1–0	2–2	1–1	1–0	2–2	0–3	1–1	2–1	1–0	2–0	0–0	1–2	4–4	2–0	3–2	3–3	1–1	1–2	2–1	1–1
Bournemouth & Boscombe Athletic	2–2		0–0	2–0	3–1	0–1	1–0	0–0	1–2	1–1	3–1	4–0	0–0	0–0	0–1	1–0	2–1	2–0	1–3	4–1	4–0	2–0	2–0	4–0
Brentford	2–0	2–1		4–2	2–2	1–1	3–0	2–0	1–4	3–2	1–0	2–2	1–1	2–1	1–2	2–0	2–2	1–1	2–1	2–1	1–2	1–3	2–2	0–0
Brighton & Hove Albion	5–2	4–1	3–0		2–0	2–1	5–0	1–0	5–0	3–0	1–1	2–1	4–1	4–0	6–0	1–1	3–1	3–2	5–0	4–0	2–0	3–2	3–0	2–3
Colchester United	4–0	1–0	0–3	3–3		2–0	2–4	5–1	1–1	3–3	2–1	1–2	2–1	2–0	3–2	4–1	0–3	2–0	3–2	3–6	5–0	3–2	1–1	4–1
Coventry City	1–1	3–1	2–1	3–2	2–0		1–3	2–2	2–0	3–1	3–0	5–1	3–0	0–1	5–3	4–1	0–0	2–1	2–0	0–0	6–0	1–2	1–0	3–0
Crystal Palace	1–0	1–3	0–2	1–2	1–1	3–0		0–1	1–3	1–0	1–2	2–2	1–0	2–3	2–0	1–1	2–3	0–1	0–2	1–2	0–2	3–0	2–0	1–2
Exeter City	2–1	2–0	2–3	0–5	0–0	2–3	6–1		2–1	2–2	1–1	3–1	2–0	3–1	1–1	2–0	0–2	3–0	3–2	0–1	1–2	0–0	1–1	1–2
Gillingham	2–0	2–1	1–2	1–0	2–1	1–1	1–1	2–1		0–0	0–1	4–3	3–2	0–2	3–1	0–2	2–0	3–1	1–2	2–3	4–0	1–3	0–1	3–0
Ipswich Town	2–1	1–0	1–1	2–1	3–1	1–0	3–3	2–2	1–1		2–0	6–2	3–2	1–0	4–1	4–1	3–3	2–1	4–2	3–0	6–2	0–2	5–2	0–0
Leyton Orient	8–3	3–0	2–1	0–1	6–0	3–1	8–0	1–1	2–0	1–2		2–1	3–1	1–1	2–2	7–1	1–0	5–2	4–0	3–0	4–0	3–2	4–0	3–1
Millwall	3–3	4–0	4–0	2–4	0–1	0–2	1–1	2–0	5–0	0–5	5–0		2–4	4–1	1–0	2–0	4–0	1–2	3–2	5–0	1–1	3–2	3–2	1–1
Newport County	0–1	1–0	1–2	1–0	0–0	4–2	0–1	1–2	3–2	2–1	3–0	1–4		0–1	2–2	2–1	2–3	1–2	1–0	2–0	1–0	2–1	2–0	0–1
Northampton Town	3–2	2–1	1–0	3–0	0–2	2–1	1–1	3–0	0–2	0–5	0–1	4–0	5–0		1–1	5–2	1–2	1–0	3–1	1–1	2–1	2–0	3–1	1–3
Norwich City	0–1	0–2	1–0	3–3	1–1	1–0	3–1	2–1	5–1	3–2	2–2	4–1	2–3	4–1		1–0	2–1	3–1	1–4	7–2	4–1	0–0	3–2	4–1
Queens Park Rangers	2–2	0–1	1–1	2–1	6–2	1–2	0–3	1–0	2–2	1–1	0–1	4–0	0–0	3–2	2–3		3–3	1–1	4–0	1–2	1–0	3–1	3–2	3–2
Reading	0–5	0–2	5–2	0–2	1–3	1–0	1–0	1–2	1–2	1–5	0–1	4–1	3–0	4–1	2–2	3–1		0–1	1–1	4–1	0–1	0–3	2–0	6–1
Shrewsbury Town	3–3	1–1	1–1	2–1	2–1	3–0	2–0	2–0	3–1	1–1	1–4	3–1	5–0	1–1	6–0	1–1	3–0		2–0	1–1	1–1	1–2	2–1	0–0
Southampton	3–1	3–2	1–1	1–2	3–0	3–0	3–1	5–0	1–1	2–2	1–2	3–0	3–3	2–3	2–5	4–0	5–2	1–1		0–0	2–1	6–2	4–1	2–0
Southend United	3–2	4–1	2–2	1–2	4–0	3–0	4–3	6–0	2–2	2–3	0–0	3–1	4–1	2–0	3–1	5–1	1–0	1–0	2–1		0–0	2–3	3–2	1–0
Swindon Town	1–1	2–2	0–1	0–0	3–1	1–1	0–0	0–1	0–1	0–1	1–2	1–0	1–2	0–1	1–1	0–1	0–0	2–1	1–1	1–1		2–1	1–2	0–0
Torquay United	5–0	0–0	3–1	0–0	1–2	0–0	1–1	3–1	1–1	2–2	1–3	3–0	1–1	3–1	1–1	2–0	0–0	5–0	3–2	2–2	4–0		3–2	4–1
Walsall	4–2	0–0	1–2	2–2	0–0	2–0	4–0	3–1	2–1	1–3	0–2	2–1	3–3	2–0	2–0	2–2	1–0	1–0	1–3	3–1	4–0	1–4		2–1
Watford	1–1	0–2	0–2	1–3	1–1	2–1	0–2	2–3	0–1	0–2	0–4	4–2	1–1	2–2	1–1	0–1	1–0	3–4	1–0	3–2	2–1	2–1	4–2	

Updated to match(es) played on unknown. Source: Ian Laschke: Rothmans Book of Football League Records 1888–89 to 1978–79. Macdonald and Jane’s, London & Sydney, 1980.
Legend: Blue = home team win; Yellow = draw; Red = away team win.

=== Maps ===
Locations of the Football League Third Division South London teams 1955–1956
Locations of the Football League Third Division South teams 1955–1956

== Attendances ==
=== Division One ===
No.	Club	Average
1	Everton FC	42,768
2	Arsenal FC	42,034
3	Manchester United	39,254
4	Tottenham Hotspur FC	38,042
5	Newcastle United FC	37,666
6	Sunderland AFC	35,888
7	Wolverhampton Wanderers FC	35,185
8	Chelsea FC	34,141
9	Birmingham City FC	33,683
10	Manchester City FC	32,198
11	Aston Villa FC	29,826
12	Bolton Wanderers FC	27,964
13	West Bromwich Albion FC	26,794
14	Cardiff City FC	26,624
15	Portsmouth FC	26,260
16	Blackpool FC	26,016
17	Charlton Athletic FC	24,872
18	Preston North End FC	24,657
19	Sheffield United FC	23,581
20	Burnley FC	23,397
21	Luton Town FC	21,455
22	Huddersfield Town AFC	20,024

=== Division Two ===
No.	Club	Average
1	Liverpool FC	37,224
2	Leicester City FC	28,134
3	Bristol City FC	26,575
4	Sheffield Wednesday FC	26,247
5	Leeds United FC	24,445
6	Bristol Rovers FC	23,860
7	Blackburn Rovers FC	23,049
8	Stoke City FC	19,850
9	Fulham FC	19,597
10	Swansea City AFC	19,487
11	Port Vale FC	18,985
12	Middlesbrough FC	17,866
13	West Ham United FC	17,679
14	Plymouth Argyle FC	17,594
15	Nottingham Forest FC	16,225
16	Hull City AFC	15,419
17	Notts County FC	15,401
18	Barnsley FC	14,721
19	Lincoln City FC	13,215
20	Rotherham United FC	12,469
21	Doncaster Rovers FC	12,414
22	Bury FC	11,919

== See also ==
- 1955-56 in English football
