= Ronnie Burbeck =

English footballer (1934–2025)

Personal information
- Full name: Ronald Thomas Burbeck
- Date of birth: 27 February 1934
- Place of birth: Leicester, England
- Date of death: 31 January 2025 (aged 90)
- Place of death: Leicester, England
- Position: Winger

Youth career
- 1949–1952: Leicester City

Senior career*
Years	Team	Apps	(Gls)
1952–1956	Leicester City	3	(0)
1956–1963	Middlesbrough	139	(24)
1963–1964	Darlington	18	(1)
1964–1966	Hereford United	61	(18)

International career
1952	England U18		
- * Club domestic league appearances and goals

Ronald Thomas Burbeck (27 February 1934 – 31 January 2025) was an English footballer who scored 25 goals from 160 appearances in the Football League playing as a winger for Leicester City, Middlesbrough and Darlington. He went on to play in the Southern League for Hereford United.

== Football career ==
Burbeck was born in Leicester, and began his football career with his hometown club, Leicester City. In July 1951, he was one of 20 youngsters selected by the Football Association for an England Youth training camp, and in October that same year, the 17-year-old Burbeck was selected to represent the North in an amateur international trial. He played for England Youth against their Scottish and Welsh counterparts in 1952, and was a member of the squad for that year's FIFA Under-18 Tournament.

He made his Leicester debut in the Football League on 15 September 1952 in the Second Division match away to West Ham United, and played twice more, in the 1955–56 season, before moving on to fellow Second Division club Middlesbrough in 1956. He made his debut in a 3–1 win against Port Vale on 6 October, and in his sixth match, against Nottingham Forest, created the second goal of Brian Clough's first senior hat-trick. Burbeck remained in the starting eleven for 54 consecutive matches in all competitions, making way in December 1957 for the debut of future England international Eddie Holliday. He regained his place, only to lose it again after breaking his wrist in January 1959. He returned to the team towards the end of the season, and on 22 October 1960 scored twice in a 6–6 draw at Charlton Athletic; it was only the second time that such a scoreline had occurred in the Football League. He finished his Middlesbrough career in 1963, with 24 goals from 139 League matches and another 5 goals from 13 cup ties.

His league career ended with 18 appearances and a goal in the 1963–64 Third Division season with Darlington,.

He then joined Southern League club Hereford United in 1964. He spent 3 seasons at Edgar Street, making a total of 61 appearances and scoring 18 goals.

== Cricket ==
Burbeck played twice for Leicestershire II in the Minor Counties Cricket Championship in 1958.

== Death ==
Burbeck died in Leicester on 31 January 2025, at the age of 90.
