= Jack Taylor (footballer, born 1924) =

English footballer

Personal information
- Full name: John Ephraim Taylor
- Date of birth: 11 September 1924
- Place of birth: Chilton, England
- Date of death: 9 August 1970 (aged 45)
- Place of death: Luton, England
- Position: Inside forward

Senior career*
Years	Team	Apps	(Gls)
- Stockton
1949–1952	Luton Town	85	(29)
1952–1954	Wolverhampton Wanderers	10	(1)
1954–1957	Notts County	53	(19)
1957–1958	Bradford (Park Avenue)	12	(6)
Total		160	(55)
- * Club domestic league appearances and goals

John Ephraim Taylor (11 September 1924 – 9 August 1970) was an English professional footballer who played as an inside forward.

== Career ==
Born in Chilton, Taylor played for Stockton, Luton Town, Wolverhampton Wanderers, Notts County and Bradford (Park Avenue).
