= Phil White (footballer) =

English footballer

Personal information
- Full name: Philip George John White
- Date of birth: 29 December 1930
- Place of birth: Fulham, London, England
- Date of death: June 2000 (age 69)
- Place of death: Kingston upon Thames, England
- Position: Winger

Senior career*
Years	Team	Apps	(Gls)
–1953	Wealdstone		
1953–1964	Leyton Orient	217	(28)
- * Club domestic league appearances and goals

Philip John George White (29 December 1930 – June 2000) was an English professional footballer who played as a winger in the Football League for Leyton Orient and in non-League football for Wealdstone.
