= Brian Jordan (footballer) =

English footballer (1932–2018)

Personal information
- Full name: Brian Athol Jordan
- Date of birth: 31 January 1932
- Place of birth: Bentley, West Riding of Yorkshire, England
- Date of death: 27 December 2018 (aged 86)
- Place of death: Doncaster, South Yorkshire, England
- Height: 5 ft 11 in (1.80 m)
- Position: Half-back

Senior career*
Years	Team	Apps	(Gls)
1951–????	Derby County	0	(0)
- Denaby United
1953–1958	Rotherham United	38	(0)
1958–1960	Middlesbrough	5	(0)
1960–1961	York City	8	(0)
Total		51	(0)
- * Club domestic league appearances and goals

Brian Athol Jordan (31 January 1932 – 27 December 2018) was an English professional footballer who played as a half-back in the Football League for Rotherham United, Middlesbrough and York City, in non-League football for Denaby United, and was on the books of Derby County without making a league appearance.

He died in 2018.
