= Charlie Atkinson (footballer) =

English footballer

Personal information
- Full name: Charles Atkinson
- Date of birth: 17 December 1932
- Place of birth: Hull, England
- Date of death: 25 November 2010 (aged 77)
- Place of death: Pudsey, England
- Position: Wing half

Youth career
- Marist Old Boys
- 1950–1953: Hull City

Senior career*
Years	Team	Apps	(Gls)
1953–1956	Hull City	37	(2)
1956–1964	Bradford Park Avenue	339	(50)
1964–1965	Bradford City	16	(1)
- Real Santos
Total		392	(53)
- * Club domestic league appearances and goals

Charles Atkinson (17 December 1932 – 25 November 2010) was an English professional footballer who played as a wing half.

== Career ==
Born in Hull, Atkinson played for Marist Old Boys, Hull City, Bradford Park Avenue and Bradford City. He was a wing-half. Atkinson played for his hometown club before he joined Bradford Park Avenue's where he became their record Football League appearance holder. He finished his professional playing career with their wool city rivals Bradford City, before playing for Real Santos in Bradford.

Atkinson became president of Park Avenue before he retired due to ill-health in 2007.

== Personal life ==
Atkinson also had trials for Yorkshire at cricket.

He lived in Pudsey. He died on 25 November 2010 at the age of 77 from ill-health following a previous fall when he cracked his skull and had to have a brain operation.
