= Norman Lawson =

English footballer and cricketer

Personal information
- Full name: Norman Lawson
- Date of birth: 6 April 1935
- Place of birth: Houghton-le-Spring, England
- Date of death: 25 September 2011 (aged 76)
- Place of death: Sketty, Wales
- Position: Winger

Senior career*
Years	Team	Apps	(Gls)
- Hednesford Town
1955–1958	Bury	56	(8)
1958–1960	Swansea Town	24	(3)
1960	Watford	0	(0)
1960–1963	Kettering Town		
1963–1964	Hereford United		
- Merthyr Tydfil
- Ton Pentre
Total		80	(11)

Managerial career
- Merthyr Tydfil
- Ton Pentre
- * Club domestic league appearances and goals

Norman Lawson (6 April 1935 – 25 September 2011) was an English footballer and cricketer.

== Career ==
=== Football career ===
Lawson played as a winger, spending his early career with Hednesford Town, Bury and Swansea Town. He later played for Watford, Kettering Town, Hereford United and Merthyr Tydfil, before becoming player-manager of Ton Pentre.

=== Cricket career ===
Lawson played club cricket for Swansea Civil Service, Sketty Church, AWCO and Sketty Quins clubs, while he was Captain of the Welsh over-50 team.

== Later life and death ==
Lawson died on 25 September 2011, aged 75, at Hill House Hospital in Sketty.
