= Don Roby =

English footballer

Personal information
- Date of birth: 15 November 1933
- Place of birth: Wigan, England
- Date of death: 10 June 2013 (aged 79)
- Position: Right half

Senior career*
Years	Team	Apps	(Gls)
1950–1961	Notts County	226	(37)
1961–1965	Derby County	70	(6)
- Burton Albion
- Loughborough United
Total		296	(43)
- * Club domestic league appearances and goals

Don Roby (15 November 1933 – 10 June 2013) was an English professional footballer who played as a right half.

== Career ==
Born in Wigan, Roby played for Notts County, Derby County, Burton Albion and Loughborough United.
