= Bobby Corbett =

English footballer

Personal information
- Full name: Robert Corbett
- Date of birth: 16 March 1922
- Place of birth: Newcastle Upon Tyne, England
- Date of death: October 1988 (aged 66)
- Place of death: Newcastle Upon Tyne, England
- Position: Left back

Youth career
- Newcastle United

Senior career*
Years	Team	Apps	(Gls)
1946–1951	Newcastle United	46	(1)
1951–1957	Middlesbrough	92	(0)
1957–1958	Northampton Town	8	(1)
Total		146	(2)
- * Club domestic league appearances and goals

Robert Corbett (16 March 1922 – October 1988) was an English footballer who played as a defender. He was the brother of George Corbett, also a professional footballer. He began playing at non-league club Throckley Welfare, later moving to Newcastle United and made his professional debut in 1946 against Barnsley F.C. after the conclusion of the Second World War. He was sold to neighbouring club Middlesbrough in 1951 for £9000, where he made 92 appearances over five seasons. He finished his career with a two-year spell at Northampton Town.

Corbett won an FA Cup winners medal with Newcastle in the 1951 FA Cup Final after defeating Blackpool 2–0. He played alongside other notable players such as Jackie Milburn and Charlie Crowe.

Corbett died in October 1988 at the age of 66 after spending his retirement living in North Walbottle.

== Honours ==
=== As a player ===
Newcastle United

- FA Cup: 1950–51
