= Esmond Million =

English footballer (born 1938)

Personal information
- Date of birth: 15 March 1938 (age 88)
- Place of birth: Ashington, England
- Position: Goalkeeper

Youth career
- Amble Juniors

Senior career*
Years	Team	Apps	(Gls)
1956–1962	Middlesbrough	52	(0)
1962–1963	Bristol Rovers	38	(0)
- * Club domestic league appearances and goals

Esmond Million (born 15 March 1938) is a former football goalkeeper.

== Playing career ==
Million played for Middlesbrough from 1956 to 1962. He joined Bristol Rovers in 1962.

In April 1963, he took a £300 bribe to throw a match. The ploy failed and Million was exposed amid the 1964 British football match-fixing scandal. After having been banned from football for life, he emigrated with his family to Canada where he became active in professional ice hockey. He would eventually return to Britain and is now thought to be living in Tunbridge Wells, Kent.
