= Ken McPherson =

English footballer

Personal information
- Date of birth: 25 March 1927
- Place of birth: Hartlepool, England
- Date of death: 5 February 2018 (aged 90)
- Position: Centre forward

Youth career
- Horden Colliery Welfare

Senior career*
| Years | Team | Apps | (Gls) |
| 1950–1953 | Notts County | 26 | (10) |
| 1953–1955 | Middlesbrough | 33 | (15) |
| 1955–1958 | Coventry City | 88 | (38) |
| 1958–1961 | Newport County | 128 | (51) |
| 1961–1965 | Swindon Town | 107 | (3) |
| Total | | 382 | (117) |
- * Club domestic league appearances and goals

Ken McPherson (25 March 1927 – 5 February 2018) was an English professional footballer. A centre-forward, he began his career with Notts county in 1950 before moving on to Middlesbrough in 1957 and Coventry City in 1955.

In 1958 McPherson joined Newport County and went on to make 128 league appearances for the club, scoring 51 goals. He moved then moved to Swindon Town where he made 107 appearances between 1961 and 1965.
