= Jimmy Jackson (footballer, born 1931) =

Scottish footballer

Personal information
- Date of birth: 26 March 1931
- Place of birth: Glasgow, Scotland
- Date of death: 2 March 2013 (aged 81)
- Position: Striker

Youth career
- Mapperley Celtic

Senior career*
Years	Team	Apps	(Gls)
1948–1958	Notts County	113	(47)
1953–1954	→ Toronto		
- Headington United
- * Club domestic league appearances and goals

James Jackson (26 March 1931 – 2 March 2013) was a Scottish footballer who played mainly for Notts County.

Jackson made over 120 appearances for Notts County, scoring 50 goals, in two spells with the club. In between, he briefly played in Canada for Toronto.
