= Bob Crosbie =

Scottish footballer

Personal information
- Full name: Robert Crichton Crosbie
- Date of birth: 2 September 1925
- Place of birth: Glasgow, Scotland
- Date of death: 18 February 1994 (aged 68)
- Place of death: Glasgow, Scotland
- Position: Striker

Senior career*
| Years | Team | Apps | (Gls) |
| 1947–1949 | Bury | 9 | (5) |
| 1949–1953 | Bradford Park Avenue | 139 | (72) |
| 1953–1955 | Hull City | 61 | (22) |
| 1955–1957 | Grimsby Town | 65 | (45) |
| 1957–1958 | Queen of the South | 21 | (11) |
| Total | | 295 | (155) |
- * Club domestic league appearances and goals

Robert Crichton "Bob" Crosbie (2 September 1925 – 18 February 1994) was a Scottish footballer who played for Bury, Bradford Park Avenue, Hull City, Grimsby Town and Queen of the South.
