= Joe Birbeck =

English footballer

Personal information
- Full name: Joseph Birbeck
- Date of birth: 15 April 1932
- Place of birth: Stanley, County Durham, England
- Date of death: 11 March 2016 (aged 83)
- Place of death: Stanley, England
- Position: Wing half

Senior career*
Years	Team	Apps	(Gls)
1951–1953	Evenwood Town		
1953–1959	Middlesbrough	38	(0)
1959–1960	Grimsby Town	18	(0)
1960–196?	South Shields		
- * Club domestic league appearances and goals

Joseph Birbeck (15 April 1932 – 11 March 2016) was an English professional footballer who played as a wing half in the Football League for Middlesbrough and Grimsby Town.
