= Lindy Delapenha =

Jamaican football player and journalist (1927–2017)

Personal information
- Full name: Lloyd Lindbergh Delapenha
- Date of birth: 20 May 1927
- Place of birth: Spanish Town, Colony of Jamaica, British Empire
- Date of death: 26 January 2017 (aged 89)

Senior career*
Years	Team	Apps	(Gls)
1948–1950	Portsmouth	8	(1)
1950–1958	Middlesbrough	260	(90)
1958–1960	Mansfield Town	115	(27)
1960	Hereford United		
1964	Burton Albion		
- * Club domestic league appearances and goals

Lloyd Lindbergh "Lindy" Delapenha (20 May 1927 – 26 January 2017) was a Jamaican footballer and sports journalist. He was the first Jamaican to play professional football in England. Between 1948 and 1960, he played league football for Portsmouth, Middlesbrough and Mansfield Town. Despite limited appearances for Portsmouth in the 1948/1949 and 1949/1950 seasons, he nevertheless played a part in the club's two title-winning sides and with it became the first black player to win a First Division championship medal.

== Playing career ==
Delapenha started playing competitive football at the age of 11 when he played for Wolmer's Schools. He scored his first goal for Wolmer's against St. George's College, Jamaica in the Manning Cup competition. Delapenha then attended Munro College in Jamaica where he was a multi-sport athlete. As a schoolboy, Delapenha took part in 16 events over a one-and-a-half-day period in England. He then served with the British Armed Forces in the Middle East following World War II. During his service, an English football scout saw him playing football for the British Army.

This gained him a trial with Arsenal, but he did not sign for the club, and in April 1948 he joined Portsmouth. There, he became the first Jamaican to play professional football in England. Although it is claimed he was the first non-white player to appear in the English Football League First Division, he was actually predated by several other non-white players, including Arthur Wharton, who played a First Division match for Sheffield United as far back as 1894–95. He was, however, the first Black player at several of the clubs he played for: Portsmouth (debut, 13 November 1948); Middlesbrough (debut, 6 May 1950); Mansfield Town (debut, 23 August 1958); and Burton Albion (debut, 18 August 1962).

In April 1950, after a successful few years with Portsmouth, he transferred to Middlesbrough where his career took off. He played on the wing or inside-forward, and became Boro's leading scorer in the 1951–52, 1953–54 and 1955–56 seasons. In total he scored 93 league and FA Cup goals in 270 appearances.

He moved to Mansfield Town in June 1958, contributing 27 goals in 115 appearances over two years, before retiring from League football in 1960. Delapenha played non-league football for Hereford United and Burton Albion. He won the Southern League Cup in 1964 with Burton.

== Later life ==
Having returned to Jamaica in 1964, Delapenha played cricket for a short time and represented Boys' Town at football, taking them from Division 3 up to Division 1. He also coached his alma mater, Wolmer's Schools in athletics and football in the mid 1960s. Soon after, he became director of sports at the Jamaica Broadcasting Corporation. At the JBC, he had various roles including co-ordinating coverage of cricket, the Commonwealth Games, and helped bring international football to Jamaica. He stayed there for 30 years before JBC was sold and his services were no longer required.

He died on 26 January 2017 at the age of 89, after a stroke.
