= Joe Scott (footballer, born 1930) =

English footballer (1930–2018)

Personal information
- Full name: Joseph Cumpson Scott
- Date of birth: 9 January 1930
- Place of birth: Fatfield, England
- Date of death: 30 January 2018 (aged 88)
- Height: 5 ft 10 in (1.78 m)
- Position: Inside forward

Senior career*
| Years | Team | Apps | (Gls) |
| 1949–???? | Newcastle United | 0 | (0) |
- Spennymoor United
| 1952–1954 | Luton Town | 13 | (2) |
| 1954–1959 | Middlesbrough | 93 | (26) |
| 1959–1960 | Hartlepools United | 62 | (8) |
| 1960–1961 | York City | 17 | (2) |
- Ashington
| Total | | 185 | (38) |
- * Club domestic league appearances and goals

Joseph Cumpson Scott (9 January 1930 – 30 January 2018) was an English professional footballer who played as an inside forward in the Football League for Luton Town, Middlesbrough, Hartlepools United and York City, in non-League football for Spennymoor United and Ashington, and was on the books of Newcastle United without making a league appearance.
