= Ray Bilcliff =

English footballer

Personal information
- Full name: Raymond Bilcliff
- Date of birth: 24 May 1931
- Place of birth: Blaydon, England
- Date of death: 10 March 2009 (aged 77)
- Place of death: Blidworth, England
- Position: Full back

Senior career*
| Years | Team | Apps | (Gls) |
| 1948–1951 | Spennymoor Juniors | | |
| 1951–1961 | Middlesbrough | 182 | (0) |
| 1961–1964 | Hartlepools United | 117 | (0) |
| Total | | 299 | (0) |
- * Club domestic league appearances and goals

Raymond Bilcliff (24 May 1931 – 10 March 2009) was an English professional footballer who played in the Football League for Hartlepools United and Middlesbrough.
