= Dicky Robinson =

English footballer

Personal information
- Full name: Richard Robinson
- Date of birth: 19 January 1927
- Place of birth: Whitburn, England
- Date of death: 19 April 2009 (aged 82)
- Place of death: Barrow-in-Furness, England
- Position: Defender

Senior career*
Years	Team	Apps	(Gls)
1945–1959	Middlesbrough	390	(1)
1959–1963	Barrow	139	(0)
- * Club domestic league appearances and goals

Richard Robinson (19 January 1927 – 19 April 2009) was a football player from England. Robinson signed for Middlesbrough after being watched by their manager David Jack.

Jack had spotted Dicky playing for local team Marsden Welfare Juniors. Dicky played in the Colts for Middlesbrough and guested for Dunfermline Athletic, whilst working as a Bevin Boy in Scotland at the end of World War II.

His debut for Middlesbrough was in the 1–0 away win against Newcastle United on 7 October 1944 as a 17-year-old in wartime competition, and he played in Boro's first post-war game against Manchester City aged 18. He went on to play a total of 390 games in the league and 26 in the FA Cup for Middlesbrough. He scored only one goal in his career – against local rivals Sunderland. After the game, he travelled home on the Sunderland team bus!

During his time at Middlesbrough, Dicky went on two FA tours with the England team to Switzerland, Portugal and Scandinavia, yet never gained a full cap. He was supposed to stand in for the injured Neil Franklin in England's 10–0 victory against Portugal in 1947, but Franklin declared himself fit 30 minutes before the start.

Dicky also went on to gain the following English League representative honours:

- 30 April 1947 English League v League of Ireland (Dublin)
- 22 October 1947 English League v Irish League (Windsor Park Belfast)
- 20 September 1948 English League v Irish League (Anfield)
- 29 November 1950 English League v Scottish League (Ibrox)
- 10 October 1951 English League v League of Ireland (Goodison Park)

During his time at Middlesbrough, Dicky also won the Players 'Footballers Association' Golf Championship at Childwall, Southport in 1951, with his manager David Jack acting as his caddy. The trophy was presented to him by Arthur Drury, the Football League Chairman.

He transferred to Barrow AFC in 1959–60 season from Middlesbrough, where he continued to play, notching up another 151 league and FA Cup games, until injury forced him out of playing the game in 1963. He carried on from 1964 to 1969 as trainer for Barrow, and then retired from the game having played in a total of 567 league and cup games.

Dicky died in April 2009, aged 82.
