= Sam Lawrie =

Scottish footballer

Personal information
- Full name: Samuel Lawrie
- Date of birth: 15 December 1934
- Place of birth: Glasgow, Scotland
- Date of death: 26 August 1979 (aged 44)
- Place of death: Bradford, England
- Position: Right winger

Youth career
- Bedlay Juniors

Senior career*
Years	Team	Apps	(Gls)
1952–1956	Middlesbrough	35	(5)
1956–1962	Charlton Athletic	193	(70)
- Montreal Concordia
1962–1966	Bradford Park Avenue	73	(16)
Total		302	(91)
- * Club domestic league appearances and goals

Samuel Lawrie (15 December 1934 – 26 August 1979) was a Scottish professional footballer who played as a right winger. Lawrie made over 300 appearances in the Football League between 1952 and 1966.

== Career ==
Born in Glasgow, Lawrie played with Bedlay Juniors, Middlesbrough, Charlton Athletic, Montreal Concordia and Bradford Park Avenue.

== Death ==
Lawrie died on 26 August 1979, at the age of 44.
