= Ray Barnard =

English footballer

Personal information
- Full name: Raymond Scholey Barnard
- Date of birth: 16 April 1933
- Place of birth: Middlesbrough, England
- Date of death: 7 July 2017 (aged 84)
- Place of death: Lincoln, England
- Position: Full back

Youth career
- –: Middlesbrough

Senior career*
| Years | Team | Apps | (Gls) |
| 1951–1960 | Middlesbrough | 113 | (0) |
| 1960–1963 | Lincoln City | 43 | (0) |
| 1963–1966 | Grantham | 84 | (2) |
| 1966–19?? | Lincoln Claytons | | |
- * Club domestic league appearances and goals

Raymond Scholey Barnard (16 April 1933 – 7 July 2017) was an English footballer who made 156 appearances in the Football League playing for Middlesbrough and Lincoln City. He then helped Grantham win the 1963–64 Midland League title, and finished his career with Lincoln Claytons. He played as a full back.
