= Billy Day =

English footballer (1936–2018)

Personal information
- Date of birth: 27 December 1936
- Place of birth: Middlesbrough, England
- Date of death: 21 January 2018 (aged 81)
- Place of death: Middlesbrough, England
- Position: Right winger

Senior career*
Years	Team	Apps	(Gls)
1955–1962	Middlesbrough	120	(18)
1961–1963	Newcastle United	13	(1)
1962–1964	Peterborough United	18	(2)
- Cambridge United
- * Club domestic league appearances and goals

William Day (27 December 1936 – 21 January 2018) was an English footballer who played for Middlesbrough and Newcastle United. He was part of the Boro attack which included Brian Clough and Alan Peacock. Whilst undertaking his national service in Germany, the club used to fly him home of the morning of match days and back again after matches. As an outside right, he wasn't a prolific goalscorer but he created many goals for his teammates.

Following his retirement, Day became a bookmaker and could be seen at racecourses in the north of England. He died in Middlesbrough on 21 January 2018, at the age of 81.

== Sources ==
- Billy Day at Post War English & Scottish Football League A–Z Player's Transfer Database
