= Rolando Ugolini =

Italian footballer

Personal information
- Full name: Rolando Ugolini
- Date of birth: 4 June 1924
- Place of birth: Lucca, Italy
- Date of death: 10 April 2014 (aged 89)
- Place of death: Edinburgh, Scotland
- Position: Goalkeeper

Senior career*
Years	Team	Apps	(Gls)
1943–1943	Heart of Midlothian	0	(0)
1944–1948	Celtic	4	(0)
1948–1957	Middlesbrough	320	(0)
1957–1960	Wrexham	83	(0)
1960–1962	Dundee United	43	(0)
1962–1963	Berwick Rangers	1	(0)
Total		451	(0)
- * Club domestic league appearances and goals

Rolando Ugolini (4 June 1924 – 10 April 2014) was a footballer, who played as a goalkeeper for a number of British clubs.

Born in Lucca, Italy, Ugolini moved to Scotland at the age of three and grew up in Armadale, West Lothian, where he played for the local club, Armadale Thistle. He appeared as a triallist in the North-Eastern League with Heart of Midlothian. He began his senior career with Celtic, before spending nine years with Middlesbrough. Spells at Wrexham and Dundee United were followed by a final game with Berwick Rangers.

Ugolini died on 10 April 2014. He was 89 years old.
