= Derek McLean =

English footballer (1932–2025)

John Derek McLean (21 December 1932 – 31 January 2025) was an English professional footballer who played for Middlesbrough and Hartlepool United. He died at the James Cook University Hospital in Middlesbrough, on 31 January 2025, at the age of 92.
