= Willie Gardiner =

Scottish footballer

Personal information
- Full name: William Silcock Gardiner
- Date of birth: 15 August 1929
- Place of birth: Larbert, Scotland
- Date of death: 5 January 2007 (aged 77)
- Place of death: Stirling, Scotland
- Position: Forward

Senior career*
Years	Team	Apps	(Gls)
- Bo'ness United
1951–1955	Rangers	25	(16)
1955–1958	Leicester City	69	(48)
1958–1959	Reading	8	(2)
- Sudbury Town
- * Club domestic league appearances and goals

William Silcock Gardiner (15 August 1929 – 5 January 2007) was a Scottish footballer who played as a forward for Rangers, Leicester City, Reading and Sudbury Town.

Born in Larbert, Gardiner started career in reserve football in Scotland with Rangers but got little opportunity to play first-team football with the likes of Willie Paton, Billy Simpson and the veteran Willie Thornton all in contention, although he had a strong scoring record when he was selected. He moved to England and signed for Leicester City for £4,000 under manager Dave Halliday.

He was a prolific goalscorer. In three seasons he scored 48 league goals in 69 games and was the leading goalscorer in the Second Division in the 1955–56 season. He lost his starting place in 1957 and was then playing reserve team football. In 1958 he signed for Reading, his time there being hampered by two serious injuries. He finished his career with Sudbury Town and later found employment as telephone exchange operator for British Telecom.
