= 1960–61 Middlesbrough F.C. season =

Middlesbrough
1960–61 season
- Chairman: Eric Thomas
- Manager: Bob Dennison
- Stadium: Ayresome Park
- Division Two: 5th
- FA Cup: Round 3
- League Cup: Round 1
- Top goalscorer: League: Brian Clough (34); All: Clough (36)
Home colours	Away colours

The 1960–61 season was Middlesbrough's 78th year in existence and 7th consecutive season in the Division Two. Also the club competed in the FA Cup and the inaugural League Cup.

== Summary ==
During summer Goalkeeper Peter Taylor left the club after five seasons, Port Vale manager Norman Low paid Middlesbrough £750 for Taylor's services. In his sixth season as manager Bob Dennison took off Boro to the 5th place just ten points below promotion to Division One. Forward Brian Clough scored 34 goals with another brilliant partnership among Alan Peacock and aimed by assists from Derek McLean. Scottish Forward Willie Fernie lost its position as starter. Full back Mick McNeil delivered another decent performance. In spite of a premier class offensive line, Boro again collapsed due to a weak defensive allowing a lot of goals against both Bob Appleby and Esmond Million. Also, the squad reached the FA Cup third round being eliminated by Manchester United. After six years and several transfer requests Forward Brian Clough left the club transferred out to Boro rivals Sunderland F.C.

== Squad ==
Note: Flags indicate national team as defined under FIFA eligibility rules; some limited exceptions apply. Players may hold more than one non-FIFA nationality.

Pos.	Nation	Player
GK	ENG	Bob Appleby
GK	ENG	Esmond Million
DF	ENG	Mick McNeil
DF	ENG	Ken Thomson
DF	ENG	Derek Stonehouse
DF	ENG	Ray Bilcliff
DF	ENG	Derrick Wilkie
DF	ENG	Gordon Jones
DF	ENG	Billy Horner
MF	ENG	Ray Henderson
MF	SCO	Don Walker
MF	ENG	Dennis Windross
MF	SCO	Ray Yeoman

Pos.	Nation	Player
MF	WAL	Bill Harris
FW	ENG	Ron Burbeck
FW	ENG	Eddie Holliday
FW	ENG	Ronnie Waldock
FW	ENG	Derek McLean
FW	ENG	Brian Clough (c)
FW	ENG	Alan Peacock
FW	SCO	Willie Fernie
FW	ENG	Alan Rodgerson
FW	SCO	Willie Hamilton
FW	ENG	Joe Livingstone
FW	ENG	Billy Day
FW	ENG	Arthur Kaye

=== Transfers ===
In
Pos.	Name	from	Type
MF	Arthur Kaye	Blackpool F.C.	
DF	Gordon Jones		
FW	Willie Hamilton	Sheffield United	
DF	Billy Horner		
FW	Joe Livingstone		

Out
Pos.	Name	To	Type
GK	Peter Taylor	Port Vale F.C.	
DF	Brian Phillips	Mansfield Town	
DF	Ray Barnard	Lincoln City F.C.	
MF	Carl Taylor	Aldershot F.C.	
DF	Norman Liggitt		
DF	Len Walker	Spennymoor United A.F.C.	

== Results ==
=== Second Division ===
==== League table ====
Pos	Team	Pld	W	D	L	GF	GA	GAv	Pts	Qualification or relegation
3	Liverpool	42	21	10	11	87	58	1.500	52	
4	Norwich City	42	20	9	13	70	53	1.321	49	
5	Middlesbrough	42	18	12	12	83	74	1.122	48	
6	Sunderland	42	17	13	12	75	60	1.250	47	
7	Swansea Town	42	18	11	13	77	73	1.055	47	Qualification for the European Cup Winners' Cup preliminary round

Rules for classification: 1) Points; 2) Goal average; 3) Goals scored

==== Results by round ====
Round	1	2	3	4	5	6	7	8	9	10	11	12	13	14	15	16	17	18	19	20	21	22	23	24	25	26	27	28	29	30	31	32	33	34	35	36	37	38	39	40	41	42
Ground	A	H	H	A	A	H	A	A	H	H	H	A	H	A	H	A	H	A	H	H	H	H	A	H	A	A	H	A	A	H	A	H	A	A	H	A	A	H	H	A	H	A
Result	W	L	D	L	W	W	D	D	L	W	D	D	W	D	W	D	W	L	D	W	D	W	W	D	L	W	W	L	W	W	L	D	D	L	W	L	L	W	W	L	W	L
Position	8	11	13	16	14	10	9	6	9	7	8	8	6	7	5	6	5	8	7	7	7	5	5	5	7	5	4	6	5	4	5	4	4	6	4	5	6	5	4	5	4	5

Source: https://www.11v11.com/teams/middlesbrough/tab/matches/season/1961/
A = Away; H = Home; W = Win; D = Draw; L = Loss; = Champions, Promoted to 1961-62 Division One; = Promoted to 1961–62 Division One; = Relegated to 1961–62 Division Three

==== Matches ====
- .- Source: Middlesbrough match record: 1961

20 August 1960 1	Bristol Rovers	2–3	Middlesbrough	Bristol
	Peter Hooper 41'; Doug Hillard 74'	8	7', 79' Alan Peacock; 60'Eddie Holliday	Stadium: Eastville Stadium; Attendance: 20,093; Referee: ET Jennings

24 August 1960 2	Middlesbrough	1–2	Derby County	Middlesbrough
	Derek McLean 56'	11	Peter Thompson; George Darwin	Stadium: Ayresome Park; Attendance: 18,348; Referee: E Crawford

27 August 1960 3	Middlesbrough	1–1	Liverpool	Middlesbrough
	Alan Peacock 16'	13	81' Kevin Lewis	Stadium: Ayresome Park; Attendance: 21,236; Referee: A Hawcroft

31 August 1960 4	Derby County	1–0	Middlesbrough	Derby
	Ray Swallow	16		Stadium: Baseball Ground; Attendance: 19,019; Referee: JS McLoughlin

3 September 1960 5	Rotherham United	1–2	Middlesbrough	Rotherham
	Keith Kettleborough 27'	14	20' Brian Clough; 25' Alan Peacock	Stadium: Millmoor; Attendance: 10,569; Referee: J Mitchell

10 September 1960 6	Middlesbrough	5–0	Southampton	Middlesbrough
	Dennis Windross 16'; Brian Clough 18', 80'; Alan Peacock 47'; Bill Harris 85'	10		Stadium: Ayresome Park; Attendance: 16,760; Referee: JE Carr

15 September 1960 7	Scunthorpe United	1–1	Middlesbrough	Scunthorpe
	Barrie Thomas 43'	9	74' Brian Clough	Stadium: Old Show Ground; Attendance: 13,852; Referee: J Powell

17 September 1960 8	Leeds United	4–4	Middlesbrough	Leeds
	Derek Stonehouse 19' (o.g.); Freddie Goodwin 35'; Bobby Cameron 42' (pen.); Johnny McCole 62'	6	6' Ray Henderson; 16', 63' Brian Clough; 50' Derek McLean	Stadium: Elland Road; Attendance: 17,799; Referee: RH Windle

21 September 1960 9	Middlesbrough	1–3	Scunthorpe United	Middlesbrough
	Ray Henderson	9		Stadium: Ayresome Park; Attendance: 19,744; Referee: J Powell

24 September 1960 10	Middlesbrough	1–0	Sunderland	Middlesbrough
	Brian Clough 56'	7		Stadium: Ayresome Park; Attendance: 27,458; Referee: A Murdoch

1 October 1960 11	Middlesbrough	2–2	Brighton & Hove Albion	Middlesbrough
	Brian Clough 8'; Ray Henderson 82'	8	51' Mike Tiddy; 53' Adrian Thorne	Stadium: Ayresome Park; Attendance: 15,700; Referee: JW Bullough

8 October 1960 12	Plymouth Argyle	3–3	Middlesbrough	Plymouth
	George Kirby 30'; Alex Jackson 46'; Jim McAnearney 71'	8	8' Ron Burbeck; 16', 42' Brian Clough	Stadium: Home Park; Attendance: 19,894; Referee: PG Brandwood

15 October 1960 13	Middlesbrough	2–0	Norwich City	Middlesbrough
	Ray Henderson 30'; Brian Clough 75'	6		Stadium: Ayresome Park; Attendance: 14,737; Referee: J Bellwood

22 October 1960 14	Charlton Athletic	6–6	Middlesbrough	Charlton (London)
	Eddie Werge 14'; Dennis Edwards 20', 44', 69'; Stuart Leary 27'; Johnny Summers 89'	7	15', 30', 62' Brian Clough; 17', 50' Ron Burbeck; 28' Derek McLean	Stadium: The Valley; Attendance: 10,064; Referee: GW Pullin

29 October 1960 15	Middlesbrough	3–1	Sheffield United	Middlesbrough
	Bill Harris 20' (pen.); Brian Clough 70'; Derek McLean 89'	5	Derek 'Doc' Pace 35'	Stadium: Ayresome Park; Attendance: 23,070; Referee: AW Luty

5 November 1960 16	Stoke City	1–1	Middlesbrough	Stoke-on-Trent
	Derrick Ward 28'	6	57' (pen.) Bill Harris	Stadium: Victoria Ground; Attendance: 9,019; Referee: A Holland

12 November 1960 17	Middlesbrough	3–1	Swansea Town	Middlesbrough
	Brian Clough 8'; Alan Peacock 38', 47'	5	37' Graham Williams	Stadium: Ayresome Park; Attendance: 17,178; Referee: LJ Tirebuck

19 November 1960 18	Luton Town	6–1	Middlesbrough	Luton
	Les Spencer 2'; Mike Tracey 6'; Allan Brown 10', 57'; Gordon Turner 16' (pen.), 51' (pen.)	8	52' Ronnie Waldock	Stadium: Kenilworth Road; Attendance: 12,579; Referee: A Edge

26 November 1960 19	Middlesbrough	1–1	Lincoln City	Middlesbrough
	Bill Harris 40'	7	35' Roy Chapman	Stadium: Ayresome Park; Attendance: 13,053; Referee: J Powell

10 December 1960 20	Middlesbrough	2–1	Huddersfield Town	Middlesbrough
	Bill Harris 63' (pen.); Brian Clough 85'	7	8' (o.g) Mick McNeil	Stadium: Ayresome Park; Attendance: 9,948; Referee: M Dixon

17 December 1960 21	Middlesbrough	1–1	Bristol Rovers	Middlesbrough
	Arthur Kaye 73'	7	35' Peter Hooper	Stadium: Ayresome Park; Attendance: 11,759; Referee: KR Tuck

26 December 1960 22	Middlesbrough	2–0	Leyton Orient	Middlesbrough
	Brian Clough 71'; Arthur Kaye 80'	5		Stadium: Ayresome Park; Attendance: 15,996; Referee: A Murdoch

31 December 1960 23	Liverpool	3–4	Middlesbrough	Liverpool
	Alan A'Court 21'; Kevin Lewis 35', 56'	5	6' (o.g.) John Molyneux; 20' Alan Peacock; 78', 88' Brian Clough	Stadium: Anfield; Attendance: 34,645; Referee: JE Carr

14 January 1961 24	Middlesbrough	2–2	Rotherham United	Middlesbrough
	Lol Morgan 53' (o.g); Brian Clough 81'	5	24' (pen.) Peter Perry; 70' Alan Kirkman	Stadium: Ayresome Park; Attendance: 15,638; Referee: CF Duxbury

21 January 1961 25	Southampton	3–2	Middlesbrough	Southampton
	Terry Paine 3'; Derek Reeves 22'; Harry Penk 36'	7	34' (pen.) Bill Harris; 89' Alan Peacock	Stadium: The Dell; Attendance: 18,560; Referee: RE Smith

28 January 1961 26	Portsmouth	0–3	Middlesbrough	Portsmouth
		5	14', 68', 88' Brian Clough	Stadium: Fratton Park; Attendance: 7,272; Referee: JG Williams

4 February 1961 27	Middlesbrough	3–0	Leeds United	Middlesbrough
	Alan Peacock 13'; Brian Clough 33', 78'	4		Stadium: Ayresome Park; Attendance: 16,593; Referee: P Rhodes

11 February 1961 28	Sunderland	2–0	Middlesbrough	Sunderland
	Harry Hooper 9'; Willie McPheat 20'	6		Stadium: Roker Park; Attendance: 53,254; Referee: JA Cattlin

18 February 1961 29	Brighton & Hove Albion	0–1	Middlesbrough	Brighton
			16' Alan Peacock	Stadium: Goldstone Ground; Attendance: 16,286; Referee: AJ Robottom

25 February 1961 30	Middlesbrough	3–1	Plymouth Argyle	Middlesbrough
	Willie Hamilton 13'; Ray Yeoman 85'; Don Walker 89' (pen.)	4	47' Ken Maloy	Stadium: Ayresome Park; Attendance: 16,606; Referee: H Webb

4 March 1961 31	Norwich City	4–1	Middlesbrough	Norwich
	Jimmy Hill 38'; Terry Allcock 46', 81'; Bill Punton 51'	5	47' Arthur Kaye	Stadium: Carrow Road; Attendance: 25,610; Referee: AJ Sturgeon

11 March 1961 32	Middlesbrough	2–2	Charlton Athletic	Middlesbrough
	Alan Peacock 67'; Mick McNeil 83'	4	25', 55' Dennis Edwards	Stadium: Ayresome Park; Attendance: 15,126; Referee: E Crawford

14 March 1961 33	Leyton Orient	1–1	Middlesbrough	Leyton (London)
	Terry McDonald 42'	4	24' Clough	Stadium: Brisbane Road; Attendance: 11,658; Referee: JW Bullough

18 March 1961 34	Huddersfield Town	1–0	Middlesbrough	Huddersfield
	Les Massie 69'	6		Stadium: Leeds Road; Attendance: 11,788; Referee: RJ Simons

25 March 1961 35	Middlesbrough	1–0	Stoke City	Middlesbrough
	Brian Clough 46'	4		Stadium: Ayresome Park; Attendance: 8,736

31 March 1961 36	Ipswich Town	3–1	Middlesbrough	Ipswich
		5		Attendance: 22,239

1 April 1961 37	Lincoln City	5–2	Middlesbrough	Lincoln
	Jeff Smith 23' (pen.); Neville Bannister 30'; Roy Chapman 42', 66', 72'	6	27' Brian Clough; 47' Alan Peacock	Stadium: Sincil Bank; Attendance: 5,115

3 April 1961 38	Middlesbrough	3–1	Ipswich Town	Middlesbrough
	Ray Yeoman 25'; Bill Harris 88' (pen.); Brian Clough 89'	5	85' Ted Phillips	Stadium: Ayresome Park; Attendance: 12,996; Referee: LJ Tirebuck

8 April 1961 39	Middlesbrough	2–1	Luton Town	Middlesbrough
	Brian Clough 34', 48'	4	46' Roly Legate	Stadium: Ayresome Park; Attendance: 13,017

15 April 1961 40	Swansea Town	3–2	Middlesbrough	Swansea
	Roy Saunders 23'; Reg Davies 48'; Brayley Reynolds 54'		22' Alan Peacock; 61' Brian Clough	Stadium: Vetch Field; Attendance: 15,335; Referee: JA Cattlin

22 April 1961 41	Middlesbrough	3–0	Portsmouth F.C.	Middlesbrough
	Ronnie Waldock 15', 79'; Brian Clough 31'	4		Stadium: Ayresome Park; Attendance: 9,339; Referee: AW Sparling

29 April 1961 42	Sheffield United	4–1	Middlesbrough	Sheffield
	Derek 'Doc' Pace 34', 82'; Len Allchurch 54'; Billy Russell 76'	5	68' Derek McLean	Stadium: Bramall Lane; Attendance: 18,868

=== FA Cup ===
7 January 1961 Round 3	Manchester United	3–0	Middlesbrough	Greater Manchester
	Noel Cantwell 43'; Alex Dawson 76', 89'			Stadium: Old Trafford; Attendance: 49,184; Referee: KG Aston

=== League Cup ===
3 October 1960 Round 1	Middlesbrough	3–4	Cardiff City	Middlesbrough
	Brian Clough 21', 78'; Alan Peacock 89'		Peter Donnelly (pen.)Trevor Edwards; Colin Hudson; Brian Walsh	Stadium: Ayresome Park; Attendance: 15,695

== Statistics ==
=== Squad statistics ===
No.	Pos	Nat	Player	Total		Football League Division Two		FA Cup		Football League Cup	
No.	Pos	Nat	Player	Apps	Goals	Apps	Goals	Apps	Goals	Apps	Goals
	GK	(England) ENG	Bob Appleby	25	0	23	0	1	0	1	0
	DF	(England) ENG	Mick McNeil	41	1	39	1	1	0	1	0
	DF	(England) ENG	Ken Thomson	40	0	38	0	1	0	1	0
	DF	(England) ENG	Derek Stonehouse	22	0	21	0	1	0	0	0
	MF	(Scotland) SCO	Ray Yeoman	44	2	42	2	1	0	1	0
	MF	(Wales) WAL	Bill Harris	32	7	31	7	0	0	1	0
	FW	(England) ENG	Ron Burbeck	22	3	20	3	1	0	1	0
	FW	(England) ENG	Derek McLean	20	5	20	5	0	0	0	0
	FW	(England) ENG	Brian Clough	42	36	40	34	1	0	1	2
	FW	(England) ENG	Alan Peacock	37	16	35	15	1	0	1	1
	FW	(England) ENG	Arthur Kaye	21	3	20	3	1	0	0	0
	GK	(England) ENG	Esmond Million	19	0	19	0	0	0	0	0
	FW	(England) ENG	Ronnie Waldock	22	3	21	3	1	0	0	0
	DF	(England) ENG	Gordon Jones	18	0	17	0	0	0	1	0
	FW	(England) ENG	Eddie Holliday	18	1	17	1	0	0	1	0
	MF	(Scotland) SCO	Don Walker	13	1	12	1	1	0	0	0
	FW	(England) ENG	Billy Day	9	0	9	0	0	0	0	0
	FW	(Scotland) SCO	Willie Hamilton	8	1	8	1	0	0	0	0
	DF	(England) ENG	Ray Bilcliff	8	0	8	0	0	0	0	0
	MF	(England) ENG	Ray Henderson	7	4	7	4	0	0	0	0
	DF	(England) ENG	Billy Horner	4	0	4	0	0	0	0	0
	MF	(England) ENG	Dennis Windross	3	1	3	1	0	0	0	0
	FW	(Scotland) SCO	Willie Fernie	4	0	3	0	0	0	1	0
	DF	(England) ENG	Derrick Wilkie	2	0	2	0	0	0	0	0
	FW	(England) ENG	Joe Livingstone	2	0	2	0	0	0	0	0
	FW	(England) ENG	Alan Rodgerson	1	0	1	0	0	0	0	0

- Source: https://www.11v11.com/teams/middlesbrough/tab/players/season/1961/
