= 1959–60 Middlesbrough F.C. season =

Middlesbrough
1959–60 season
- Chairman: Eric Thomas
- Manager: Bob Dennison
- Stadium: Ayresome Park
- Division Two: 5th
- FA Cup: 3rd round
- Top goalscorer: League: Brian Clough (39); All: Clough (40)
Home colours	Away colours

The 1959–60 season was Middlesbrough's 77th year in existence and 6th consecutive season in the Division Two. Also the club competed in the FA Cup.

== Summary ==
In his fifth season as manager Bob Dennison took off Boro to the 5th place just 10 points below promotion to Division One. Forward Brian Clough scored 40 goals with another brilliant partnership among Alan Peacock and aimed by assists from Scottish Forward Fernie. Clough was the Division Two topscorer again for the second consecutive season. The midfield was hit by injuries with Harris and Hilliday delivered a decent performance, meanwhile Day and Burbeck were out for several rounds. McNeil clinched the left back position as starter. In spite of a premier class offensive line, Boro again collapsed due to a weak defensive hit by injuries of Stonehouse and Phillips not being regular starters among Bilcliff and McNeil allowing a lot of goals against both Goalkeepers Taylor and Million. Also, the squad reached the FA Cup third round being eliminated by Sheffield Wednesday.

== Squad ==
Note: Flags indicate national team as defined under FIFA eligibility rules; some limited exceptions apply. Players may hold more than one non-FIFA nationality.

Pos.	Nation	Player
GK	ENG	Peter Taylor
GK	ENG	Esmond Million
GK	ENG	Bob Appleby
DF	ENG	Ray Bilcliff
DF	ENG	Brian Phillips
DF	ENG	Derek Stonehouse
DF	ENG	Ray Barnard
DF	ENG	Mick McNeil
DF	SCO	Ken Thomson
DF	ENG	Derrick Wilkie
DF	ENG	Norman Liggitt
DF	ENG	Len Walker
MF	ENG	Carl Taylor

Pos.	Nation	Player
MF	WAL	Bill Harris
MF	SCO	Ray Yeoman
MF	SCO	Don Walker
MF	ENG	Dennis Windross
FW	ENG	Ron Burbeck
FW	ENG	Eddie Holliday
FW	SCO	Willie Fernie
FW	ENG	Brian Clough (c)
FW	ENG	Alan Peacock
FW	ENG	Alan Rodgerson
FW	ENG	Derek McLean
FW	ENG	Ronnie Waldock
MF	ENG	Billy Day

=== Transfers ===
In
Pos.	Name	from	Type
GK	Bob Appleby		
DF	Ken Thomson	Stoke City	
MF	Don Walker	Leicester City	
FW	Ronnie Waldock	Plymouth Argyle	
DF	Derrick Wilkie		
MF	Dennis Windross		
DF	Norman Liggitt		
DF	Len Walker		

Out
Pos.	Name	To	Type
MF	Ronnie Dicks		retired
DF	Dicky Robinson	Barrow A.F.C.	
DF	Ernie Walley	Tottenham Hotspur	
DF	Brian Jordan	York City	
FW	Joe Scott	Hartlepools United	
DF	Joe Birbeck	Grimsby Town F.C.	
FW	George Crook		
MF	Billy Wilkinson		

== Results ==
=== Second Division ===
==== League table ====
Pos	Team	Pld	W	D	L	GF	GA	GAv	Pts
3	Liverpool	42	20	10	12	90	66	1.364	50
4	Sheffield United	42	19	12	11	68	51	1.333	50
5	Middlesbrough	42	19	10	13	90	64	1.406	48
6	Huddersfield Town	42	19	9	14	73	52	1.404	47
7	Charlton Athletic	42	17	13	12	90	87	1.034	47

Rules for classification: 1) Points; 2) Goal average; 3) Goals scored

==== Results by round ====
Round	1	2	3	4	5	6	7	8	9	10	11	12	13	14	15	16	17	18	19	20	21	22	23	24	25	26	27	28	29	30	31	32	33	34	35	36	37	38	39	40	41	42
Ground	H	A	A	H	H	H	A	A	H	A	H	H	A	H	A	H	A	H	A	H	A	A	A	H	H	A	H	A	H	A	A	H	A	H	A	H	A	H	H	A	A	H
Result	D	L	W	D	W	W	W	D	W	L	W	D	L	W	L	W	L	W	L	W	W	L	W	W	W	D	D	L	W	D	D	L	L	W	L	W	W	W	L	D	L	D
Position	14	20	11	7	6	5	4	2	2	4	3	3	4	4	5	4	4	4	4	4	4	5	4	4	4	4	4	4	4	3	3	3	4	4	6	4	3	3	3	3	6	5

Source: https://www.11v11.com/teams/middlesbrough/tab/matches/season/1960/
A = Away; H = Home; W = Win; D = Draw; L = Loss; = Champions, Promoted to 1959-60 Division One; = Promoted to 1959–60 Division One; = Relegated to 1959–60 Division Three

==== Matches ====
- .- Source: https://www.11v11.com/teams/middlesbrough/tab/matches/season/1960/

22 August 1959 1	Middlesbrough	0–0	Portsmouth	Middlesbrough
		14		Stadium: Ayresome Park; Attendance: 26,122; Referee: K Dagnall

26 August 1959 2	Cardiff City	2–0	Middlesbrough	Cardiff
	Johnny Watkins 52'; Graham Moore 62'	20		Stadium: Ninian Park; Attendance: 23,052; Referee: W Clements

29 August 1959 3	Derby County	1–7	Middlesbrough	Derby
	Jack Parry 28'	11	15', 44', 56', 63' Peacock; 48' Billy Day; 75' Eddie Holliday; 80' Bill Harris	Stadium: Baseball Ground; Attendance: 19,537; Referee: FV Stringer

2 September 1959 4	Middlesbrough	1–1	Cardiff City	Middlesbrough
	Bill Harris 82' (pen.)	7	60' Johnny Watkins	Stadium: Ayresome Park; Attendance: 29,122; Referee: L Howarth

5 September 1959 5	Middlesbrough	6–2	Plymouth Argyle	Middlesbrough
	Clough 50', 59', 63', 66'; Peacock 80', 89'	6	Wilf Carter 58'; Wally Bellett 84'	Stadium: Ayresome Park; Attendance: 22,562; Referee: LN Peake

9 September 1959 6	Middlesbrough	4–0	Hull City	Middlesbrough
	Ray Yeoman 22'; Clough 28'; Billy Day 46'; Bill Harris 70' (pen.)	5		Stadium: Ayresome Park; Attendance: 28,368

12 September 1959 7	Liverpool	1–2	Middlesbrough	Liverpool
	Billy Liddell 7'	4	74' Brian Phillips; 85' Bill Harris	Stadium: Anfield; Attendance: 39,000; Referee: RJ Leafe

14 September 1959 8	Hull City	3–3	Middlesbrough	Kingston-upon-Hull
	Bill Bradbury 7', 27'; Mike Bowering 48'	2	6', 86' Peacock; 43' Clough	Stadium: Boothferry Park; Attendance: 22,024

19 September 1959 9	Middlesbrough	3–0	Charlton Athletic	Middlesbrough
	Clough 27', 38', 70'	2		Stadium: Ayresome Park; Attendance: 30,918; Referee: TH Cooper

26 September 1959 10	Bristol City	2–0	Middlesbrough	Bristol
	Jimmy Rogers 5'; Alan Williams 57'	4		Stadium: Ashton Gate; Attendance: 21,640; Referee: JS Pickles

3 October 1959 11	Middlesbrough	3–1	Scunthorpe United	Middlesbrough
	Willie Fernie 18'; Clough 50', 63'	3	67' Barrie Thomas	Stadium: Ayresome Park; Attendance: 27,979; Referee: F Cowen

10 October 1959 12	Middlesbrough	1–1	Sunderland	Middlesbrough
	Eddie Holliday 19'	3	59' Amby Fogarty	Stadium: Ayresome Park; Attendance: 47,297; Referee: J Cook

17 October 1959 13	Aston Villa	1–0	Middlesbrough	Birmingham
	Stan Lynn 66'	4		Stadium: Villa Park; Attendance: 35,362

24 October 1959 14	Middlesbrough	3–2	Lincoln City	Middlesbrough
	Derek McLean 34', 54'; Clough 79'	4	26', 70' Andy Graver	Stadium: Ayresome Park; Attendance: 24,007; Referee: R Ryalls

31 October 1959 15	Leyton Orient	5–0	Middlesbrough	Leyton (East London)
	Eddie Brown 15', 43', 80'; Ken Facey 41' (pen.); Tommy Johnston 82'	5		Stadium: Brisbane Road; Attendance: 15,600

7 November 1959 16	Middlesbrough	1–0	Huddersfield Town	Middlesbrough
	Eddie Holliday 1'	4		Stadium: Ayresome Park; Attendance: 23,077; Referee: W Crossley

14 November 1959 17	Ipswich Town	1–0	Middlesbrough	Ipswich
	Ray Crawford 69'	4		Stadium: Portman Road; Attendance: 12,975; Referee: JH Brooks

21 November 1959 18	Middlesbrough	5–1	Bristol Rovers	Middlesbrough
	Clough 14', 44', 48'; Billy Day 64'; Bill Harris 75'	4	80' Alfie Biggs	Stadium: Ayresome Park; Attendance: 24,357; Referee: A Holland

28 November 1959 19	Swansea Town	3–1	Middlesbrough	Swansea
	Graham Williams 47'; Herbie Williams 51'; Colin Webster 68'	4	44' Eddie Holliday	Stadium: Vetch Field; Attendance: 13,889; Referee: KA Collinge

5 December 1959 20	Middlesbrough	4–1	Brighton & Hove Albion	Middlesbrough
	Brian Clough 7', 68'; Eddie Holliday 46'; Bill Harris 53' (pen.)	4	13' Denis Foreman	Stadium: Ayresome Park; Attendance: 19,677; Referee: E Crawford

12 December 1959 21	Stoke City	2–5	Middlesbrough	Stoke-on-Trent
	Bobby Howitt 50'; Frank Bowyer 80'	4	60', 67', 73' Clough; 35' Eddie Holliday; 37' Billy Day	Stadium: Victoria Ground; Attendance: 15,195; Referee: K Dagnall

19 December 1959 22	Portsmouth	6–3	Middlesbrough	Portsmouth
	Mick McNeil 1' (o.g.); Ron Saunders 41', 89'; Basil Hayward 67', 83'; Harry Harris 78'	5	10' Clough; 50' (pen.) Bill Harris; 63' Billy Day	Stadium: Fratton Park; Attendance: 9,912

26 December 1959 23	Rotherham United	0–2	Middlesbrough	Rotherham
	Alan Peacock 33'; Derek McLean 51'	4		Stadium: Millmoor; Attendance: 19,980; Referee: L Howarth

28 December 1959 24	Middlesbrough	3–0	Rotherham United	Middlesbrough
	Eddie Holliday 79'; Bill Harris 84' (pen.); Brian Clough 85'	4		Stadium: Ayresome Park; Attendance: 36,184; Referee: P Rhodes

2 December 1960 25	Middlesbrough	3–0	Derby County	Middlesbrough
	Derek McLean 11'; Brian Clough 81', 86'	4		Stadium: Ayresome Park; Attendance: 32,575

16 January 1960 26	Plymouth Argyle	2–2	Middlesbrough	Plymouth
	Jim McAnearney 31'; Johnny Williams 89'	4	Alan Peacock 21'; Brian Clough 71'	Stadium: Home Park; Attendance: 20,854; Referee: RE Smith

23 January 1960 27	Middlesbrough	3–3	Liverpool	Middlesbrough
	Brian Clough 6', 48'; Bill Harris 83' (pen.); Roger Hunt 41'	4	12' (o.g.) Ken Thomson; 35' Dave Hickson	Stadium: Ayresome Park; Attendance: 28,800; Referee: RH Windle

6 February 1960 28	Charlton Athletic	1–0	Middlesbrough	Charlton (London)
	Billy Kiernan 8'	4		Stadium: The Valley; Attendance: 16,487; Referee: H Horner

13 February 1960 29	Middlesbrough	6–3	Bristol City	Middlesbrough
	Brian Clough 6', 68', 89'; Bill Harris 27' (pen.); Derek McLean 32', 70'	4	40' Jimmy Rogers; 54' Malcolm Graham; 85' (pen.) Tommy Cavanagh	Stadium: Ayresome Park; Attendance: 17,871; Referee: LJ Tirebuck

20 February 1960 30	Scunthorpe United	1–1	Middlesbrough	Scunthorpe
	Barrie Thomas 5'	3	44' (o.g.) Jack Haigh	Stadium: Old Show Ground; Attendance: 10,817; Referee: JS McLoughlin

27 February 1960 31	Sunderland	2–2	Middlesbrough	Sunderland
	Ernie Taylor 11'; Alan O'Neill 48'	3	16' Ronnie Waldock; 54' (pen.) Bill Harris	Stadium: Roker Park; Attendance: 37,059; Referee: J Kelly

5 March 1960 32	Middlesbrough	0–1	Aston Villa	Middlesbrough
		3	14' Gerry Hitchens	Stadium: Ayresome Park; Attendance: 39,432

12 March 1960 33	Lincoln City	5–2	Middlesbrough	Lincoln
	John McClelland 20'; Derek Hawksworth 24', 85'; Bert Linnecor 26'; Roy Chapman 39'	4	21', 64' Brian Clough	Stadium: Sincil Bank; Attendance: 9,780

19 March 1960 34	Middlesbrough	2–0	Swansea Town	Middlesbrough
	Ronnie Waldock 75'; Brian Clough 85'	4		Stadium: Ayresome Park; Attendance: 15,719; Referee: AW Sparling

26 March 1960 35	Huddersfield Town	2–0	Middlesbrough	Huddersfield
	Kevin McHale 2'; Les Massie 46'	6		Stadium: Leeds Road; Attendance: 13,887; Referee: D Martin
Note: Last match of Goalkeeper Peter Taylor with Middlesbrough as starter.

2 April 1960 36	Middlesbrough	4–1	Ipswich Town	Middlesbrough
	Alan Peacock 25'; Eddie Holliday 40'; Brian Clough 83', 84'	4	3' Jimmy Leadbetter	Stadium: Ayresome Park; Attendance: 13,336; Referee: KA Collinge

9 April 1960 37	Bristol Rovers	0–2	Middlesbrough	Bristol
		3	25' Eddie Holliday; 41' Brian Clough	Stadium: Eastville Stadium; Attendance: 15,847; Referee: J Finney

16 April 1960 38	Middlesbrough	1–0	Stoke City	Middlesbrough
	Brian Clough 34'	3		Stadium: Ayresome Park; Attendance: 17,394; Referee: E Crawford

18 April 1960 39	Middlesbrough	1–2	Sheffield United	Middlesbrough
	Brian Clough 89'; Derek 'Doc' Pace 65'	3	61' Ron Simpson	Stadium: Ayresome Park; Attendance: 18,113; Referee: H Webb

19 April 1960 40	Sheffield United	0–0	Middlesbrough	Sheffield
		3		Stadium: Bramall Lane; Attendance: 13,667; Referee: SB Stoakes

23 April 1960 41	Brighton & Hove Albion	3–2	Middlesbrough	Brighton
	Keith Abbis 7', 48'; Ian McNeill 46'	6	54' (o.g.) Roy Jennings; 67' Brian Clough	Stadium: Goldstone Ground; Attendance: 17,526; Referee: IR Rosekilly

30 April 1960 42	Middlesbrough	2–2	Leyton Orient F.C.	Middlesbrough
	Alan Peacock 18', 38'; Tommy Johnston 83'	5	50' Eddie Brown	Stadium: Ayresome Park; Attendance: 13,044

=== FA Cup ===
9 January 1960 3	Sheffield Wednesday	2–1	Middlesbrough	Sheffield
	Tom McAnearney 35' (pen.); Keith Ellis 46'		89' Brian Clough	Stadium: Hillsborough Stadium; Attendance: 49,580; Referee: KJ Seddon

== Statistics ==
=== Squad statistics ===
No.	Pos	Nat	Player	Total		Football League Division Two		FA Cup		Other	
No.	Pos	Nat	Player	Apps	Goals	Apps	Goals	Apps	Goals	Apps	Goals
	GK	(England) ENG	Peter Taylor	35	0	34	0	1	0	0	0
	DF	(England) ENG	Ray Bilcliff	22	0	22	0	0	0	0	0
	DF	(England) ENG	Brian Phillips	19	1	19	1	0	0	0	0
	DF	(England) ENG	Mick McNeil	43	0	42	0	1	0	0	0
	MF	(Wales) WAL	Bill Harris	36	11	35	11	1	0	0	0
	MF	(Scotland) SCO	Ray Yeoman	43	1	42	1	1	0	0	0
	FW	(England) ENG	Billy Day	19	5	19	5	0	0	0	0
	FW	(Scotland) SCO	Willie Fernie	40	1	39	1	1	0	0	0
	FW	(England) ENG	Brian Clough	42	40	41	39	1	1	0	0
	FW	(England) ENG	Alan Peacock	36	13	35	13	1	0	0	0
	FW	(England) ENG	Eddie Holliday	42	9	41	9	1	0	0	0
	GK	(England) ENG	Bob Appleby	5	0	5	0	0	0	0	0
	DF	(Scotland) SCO	Ken Thomson	19	0	18	0	1	0	0	0
	FW	(England) ENG	Derek McLean	17	6	16	6	1	0	0	0
	DF	(England) ENG	Derek Stonehouse	15	0	14	0	1	0	0	0
	MF	(England) ENG	Ron Burbeck	9	0	9	0	0	0	0	0
	MF	(Scotland) SCO	Don Walker	9	0	9	0	0	0	0	0
	FW	(England) ENG	Ronnie Waldock	8	2	8	2	0	0	0	0
	DF	(England) ENG	Ray Barnard	6	0	6	0	0	0	0	0
	GK	(England) ENG	Esmond Million	3	0	3	0	0	0	0	0
	DF	(England) ENG	Derrick Wilkie	2	0	2	0	0	0	0	0
	FW	(England) ENG	Alan Rodgerson	1	0	1	0	0	0	0	0
	MF	(England) ENG	Carl Taylor	1	0	1	0	0	0	0	0
	MF	(England) ENG	Dennis Windross	1	0	1	0	0	0	0	0
	DF	(England) ENG	Norman Liggitt	0	0	0	0	0	0	0	0
	DF	(England) ENG	Len Walker	0	0	0	0	0	0	0	0

- Source: https://www.11v11.com/teams/middlesbrough/tab/players/season/1960/
