= 1957–58 Middlesbrough F.C. season =

Middlesbrough
1957–58 season
- Chairman: Eric Thomas
- Manager: Bob Dennison
- Stadium: Ayresome Park
- Division Two: 7th
- FA Cup: Fourth Round
- Top goalscorer: League: Brian Clough (40); All: Clough (41)
Home colours	Away colours

The 1957–58 season was Middlesbrough's 75th year in existence and 4th consecutive season in the Division Two. Also the club competed in the FA Cup.

== Summary ==
In his fourth season as manager Bob Dennison took off Boro to the 7th place nine points below promotion to Division One. Forward Brian Clough repeated another great performance with 41 goals scored −40 in Division Two just 3 below topscorer T.Johnston (Leyton Orient/Blackburn Rovers)- forming a brilliant partnership with Alan Peacock now in his first season as starter. Dennison reinforced the midfield with Holliday as left winger, meanwhile McLean retained his position as right winger providing the duo a lot of assists. As central midfielders, Harris and Burbeck completed a decent campaign, on the contrary the defensive line was chaotic -even with the arrival of central back Brian Phillips- allowing a lot of goals against both Goalkeepers Taylor and Million. Also, the squad reached the FA Cup fourth round being eliminated by Stoke City.

== Squad ==
Note: Flags indicate national team as defined under FIFA eligibility rules; some limited exceptions apply. Players may hold more than one non-FIFA nationality.

Pos.	Nation	Player
GK	ENG	Peter Taylor
GK	ENG	Esmond Million
DF	ENG	Frank Mulholland
DF	ENG	Ray Bilcliff
DF	ENG	Brian Phillips
DF	ENG	Ronnie Dicks (c)
DF	ENG	Dicky Robinson
DF	ENG	Derek Stonehouse
DF	ENG	Tom Brown
DF	ENG	Joe Birbeck
MF	ENG	Ray Henderson

Pos.	Nation	Player
MF	WAL	Bill Harris
MF	ENG	Carl Taylor
FW	ENG	Ron Burbeck
FW	ENG	Billy Day
FW	ENG	Derek McLean
FW	ENG	Brian Clough
FW	ENG	Alan Peacock
FW	IRL	Arthur Fitzsimons
FW	ENG	Joe Scott
FW	JAM	Lindy Delapenha
FW	ENG	Eddie Holliday

=== Transfers ===
In
Pos.	Name	from	Type
DF	Joe Birbeck		loan ended
FW	Eddie Holliday		
MF	Carl Taylor		
MF	Ray Henderson		

Out
Pos.	Name	To	Type
MF	Bobby Corbett	Northampton Town	
MF	Sam Lawrie	Charlton Athletic	
FW	Doug Cooper		

== Results ==
=== Second Division ===
==== League table ====
Pos	Team	Pld	W	D	L	GF	GA	GAv	Pts
5	Fulham	42	20	12	10	97	59	1.644	52
6	Sheffield United	42	21	10	11	75	50	1.500	52
7	Middlesbrough	42	19	7	16	83	74	1.122	45
8	Ipswich Town	42	16	12	14	68	69	0.986	44
9	Huddersfield Town	42	14	16	12	63	66	0.955	44

Rules for classification: 1) Points; 2) Goal average; 3) Goals scored

==== Results by round ====
Round	1	2	3	4	5	6	7	8	9	10	11	12	13	14	15	16	17	18	19	20	21	22	23	24	25	26	27	28	29	30	31	32	33	34	35	36	37	38	39	40	41	42
Ground	A	H	H	A	A	H	H	A	A	A	H	H	A	H	A	H	A	H	A	H	A	H	A	H	A	H	A	H	A	A	H	A	H	H	A	H	A	H	H	A	A	H
Result	L	D	D	W	W	W	D	L	D	L	W	W	W	W	L	W	L	W	D	L	L	L	L	L	D	W	W	W	L	D	W	L	W	W	W	W	L	W	L	L	W	L
Position	20	16	17	11	8	3	3	4	7	9	8	7	3	4	6	5	6	6	5	7	9	9	10	14	14	13	12	12	12	13	10	12	11	9	8	7	7	7	7	8	7	7

Source: https://www.11v11.com/teams/middlesbrough/tab/matches/season/1956/
A = Away; H = Home; W = Win; D = Draw; L = Loss; = Champions, Promoted to 1956-57 Division One; = Promoted to 1956–57 Division One; = Relegated to 1956–57 Division Three

==== Matches ====
- .- Source: Middlesbrough match record: 1958

24 August 1957 1	Stoke City	4–1	Middlesbrough	Stoke-on-Trent
	King 47', 64'; Oscroft 61'; Kelly 75'	20	9' Clough	Stadium: Victoria Ground; Attendance: 23,398; Referee: F Cowen

28 August 1957 2	Middlesbrough	2–2	Rotherham United	Middlesbrough
	Ronnie Dicks 30'; Burbeck 46'	16	38' Stephens; 56' Brown	Stadium: Ayresome Park; Attendance: 28,696; Referee: JS Swain

31 August 1957 3	Middlesbrough	0–0	Bristol City	Middlesbrough
		17		Stadium: Ayresome Park; Attendance: 21,834; Referee: E Crawford

5 September 1957 4	Rotherham United	1–4	Middlesbrough	Rotherham
	Webster 62'	11	28', 70' Clough; 50' Fitzsimons; 55' McLean	Stadium: Millmoor; Attendance: 13,195

7 September 1957 5	Cardiff City	0–2	Middlesbrough	Cardiff, Wales
		8	28', 88' Clough	Stadium: Ninian Park; Attendance: 14,013; Referee: ER Hill

18 September 1957 6	Middlesbrough	5–0	Doncaster Rovers	Middlesbrough
	Clough; Clough; Clough; Clough; Burbeck	3		Stadium: Ayresome Park

14 September 1957 7	Middlesbrough	2–2	Liverpool	Middlesbrough
	Peacock 75'; McLean 79'	3	47' Melia; 70' Rowley	Stadium: Ayresome Park; Attendance: 30,645; Referee: M Dixon

18 September 1957 8	Doncaster Rovers	2–3	Middlesbrough	Doncaster
	Ewing 55'; Kelly 86'; Mooney 89'	4	19' McLean; 51' Peacock	Stadium: Belle Vue; Attendance: 9,237; Referee: D Martin

21 September 1957 9	Barnsley	1–1	Middlesbrough	Barnsley
	Frank Beaumont 30'	7	25' Peacock	Stadium: Oakwell; Attendance: 11,577; Referee: J Mitchell

28 September 1957 10	Leyton Orient	4–0	Middlesbrough	Leyton (East London)
	Len Julians,,,	9		Stadium: Brisbane Road; Attendance: 18,487; Referee: CH Sant

5 October 1957 11	Middlesbrough	2–0	Charlton Athletic	Middlesbrough
	Clough 39'; Fitzsimons 60'	8		Stadium: Ayresome Park; Attendance: 28,123; Referee: A Murdoch

12 October 1957 12	Middlesbrough	2–0	Fulham	Middlesbrough
	Clough 44', 89'	7		Stadium: Ayresome Park; Attendance: 31,752; Referee: KR Tuck

19 October 1957 13	Swansea Town	1–4	Middlesbrough	Swansea
	Steve Leavy 15'	3	30', 79' McLean; 57' Burbeck; 86' Clough	Stadium: Vetch Field; Attendance: 8,905; Referee: J Mitchell

26 October 1957 14	Middlesbrough	3–2	Derby County	Middlesbrough
	Clough 3'; Fitzsimons 17'; McLean 84'	4	10' Upton; 24' Parry	Stadium: Ayresome Park; Attendance: 30,531; Referee: LJ Tirebuck

2 November 1957 15	Bristol Rovers	5–0	Middlesbrough	Bristol
	Jones 3', 83'; Petherbridge 43', 63'; Bradford 44'	6		Stadium: Eastville Stadium; Attendance: 20,390; Referee: A Bond

9 November 1957 16	Midlesbrough	3–1	Lincoln City	Middlesbrough
		5		Stadium: Ayresome Park

16 November 1957 17	Notts County	2–0	Middlesbrough	Nottingham
	Tommy Asher 43'; Jackie Lane 60'			Stadium: Meadow Lane; Attendance: 13,800; Referee: A Holland

23 November 1957 18	Middlesbrough	5–2	Ipswich Town	Middlesbrough
	Clough 17'; Billy Day 30'; Clough 44'; Clough 71'; Clough 81'	6	60' Tommy Garneys; 88' (pen.) Ted Phillips	Stadium: Ayresome Park; Attendance: 20,522; Referee: LJ Hamer

30 November 1957 19	Blackburn Rovers	3–3	Middlesbrough	Blackburn
	Roy Vernon 14'; Ally MacLeod 32', 84'	5	11' (o.g.) Matt Woods; 49' Billy Day; 69' Ron Burbeck	Stadium: Ewood Park; Attendance: 29,248; Referee: JV Sherlock

7 December 1957 20	Middlesbrough	1–2	Sheffield United	Middlesbrough
	Ray Henderson 10'	7	33' Derek Hawksworth; 88' Alf Ringstead	Stadium: Ayresome Park; Attendance: 22,207; Referee: AW Sparling

14 December 1957 21	West Ham United	2–1	Middlesbrough	Upton Park
	John Bond (pen.); Malcolm Musgrove	9	64' (o.g.) Noel Cantwell	Stadium: Boleyn Ground; Attendance: 20,737; Referee: BAE Buckle

21 December 1957 22	Middlesbrough	1–3	Stoke City	Middlesbrough
	George Kelly; Tim Coleman	9	65' Clough	Stadium: Ayresome Park; Attendance: 22,354

25 December 1957 23	Huddersfield Town F.C.	1–0	Middlesbrough	Huddersfield
	Les Massie	10		Stadium: Leeds Road; Attendance: 16,281

26 December 1957 24	Middlesbrough	0–1	Huddersfield Town	Middlesbrough
		14	62' Bob Ledger	Stadium: Ayresome Park; Attendance: 22,964; Referee: L Howarth

28 December 1957 25	Bristol City	0–0	Middlesbrough	Bristol
		14		Stadium: Ashton Gate; Attendance: 23,124; Referee: A Bond

11 January 1958 26	Middlesbrough	4–1	Cardiff City	Middlesbrough
	Peacock 43', 70', 81'; Bill Harris 47' (pen.)	13	48' Brian Walsh	Stadium: Ayresome Park; Attendance: 23,115; Referee: F Collinge

18 January 1958 27	Liverpool	0–2	Middlesbrough	Liverpool
		12	50'Clough; 87' Burbeck	Stadium: Anfield; Attendance: 39,246

1 February 1958 28	Middlesbrough	3–1	Barnsley	Middlesbrough
	Clough, Peacock	12	Malcolm Graham	Stadium: Ayresome Park; Attendance: 19,498

15 February 1958 29	Charlton Athletic	6–2	Middlesbrough	Charlton (London)
	Buck Ryan 15'; Johnny Summers 35', 46', 73'; Peter Firmani 68'; Billy Kiernan 70'	12	78', 85' Clough	Stadium: The Valley; Attendance: 26,198; Referee: W Hickson

22 February 1958 30	Ipswich Town	1–1	Middlesbrough	Ipswich
	Tommy Garneys 63' (pen.)	13	12' Clough	Stadium: Portman Road; Attendance: 17,768; Referee: JG Williams

1 March 1958 31	Middlesbrough	2–1	Swansea Town	Middlesbrough
	Clough 7', 75'	10	88' Pat Terry	Stadium: Ayresome Park; Attendance: 23,312; Referee: J Powell

8 March 1958 32	Derby County	2–1	Middlesbrough	Derby
	Gordon Brown 42', 48'	12	50' Clough	Stadium: Baseball Ground; Attendance: 17,419; Referee: ES Oxley

15 March 1958 33	Middlesbrough	4–3	Bristol Rovers	Middlesbrough
	Peacock 38', 61'; Clough 66', 76'	11	42', 74' Ward; 90' Bradford	Stadium: Ayresome Park; Attendance: 21,274; Referee: JV Sherlock

19 March 1958 34	Middlesbrough	2–0	Leyton Orient	Middlesbrough
	Peacock 53', 81'	9		Stadium: Ayresome Park; Attendance: 20,346; Referee: J Cook

22 March 1958 35	Lincoln City	3–2	Middlesbrough	Lincoln
8	Harbertson 29'; Brook 37'	8	9' Eddie Holliday; 62' Derek McLean; 65' Clough	Stadium: Sincil Bank; Attendance: 8,901; Referee: KR Tuck

29 March 1958 36	Middlesbrough	3–1	Notts County	Middlesbrough
	Clough 64', 82'; Peacock 65'	7	63' Jackie Lane	Stadium: Ayresome Park; Attendance: 14,879; Referee: JH Clough
Note: Million saved Lane`s penalty, but Lane scored from the rebound

4 April 1958 37	Grimsby Town	4–1	Middlesbrough	Cleethorpes
	Tommy Briggs,, Ron Rafferty	7	30' (pen.) Bill Harris	Stadium: Blundell Park; Attendance: 17,579

7 April 1958 38	Middlesbrough	5–1	Grimsby Town	Middlesbrough
	Clough 15', 54', 63'; Alan Peacock 47'; Bill Harris 56' (pen.)	7	Ron Stockin	Stadium: Ayresome Park; Attendance: 22,546

12 April 1958 39	Middlesbrough	2–3	Blackburn Rovers	Middlesbrough
	Clough 23', 53'	7	, Peter Dobing; Roy Vernon	Stadium: Ayresome Park; Attendance: 31,771; Referee: AW Luty

19 April 1958 40	Sheffield United	3–2	Middlesbrough	Sheffield
	Derek 'Doc' Pace; Derek Hawksworth (pen.); Alf Ringstead	8	37' Carl Taylor; 72' Alan Peacock	Stadium: Bramall Lane; Attendance: 20,967

21 April 1958 41	Fulham	0–1	Middlesbrough	Fulham (West London)
		7	25' Clough	Stadium: Craven Cottage; Attendance: 26,148

26 April 1958 42	Middlesbrough	1–3	West Ham United	Middlesbrough
	Arthur Fitzsimons 24'	7	Malcolm Musgrove; Vic Keeble; John Dick	Stadium: Ayresome Park; Attendance: 30,526; Referee: TH Cooper

=== FA Cup ===
4 January 1958 3	Middlesbrough	5–0	Derby County	Middlesbrough
	Billy Day 43'; Eddie Holliday 44'; Alan Peacock 72', 74'; Clough 84'			Stadium: Ayresome Park; Attendance: 29,530; Referee: ET Jennings

25 January 1958 4	Stoke City	3–1	Middlesbrough	Stoke-on-Trent
	Dennis Wilshaw 32', 35', 81'		15' Clough	Stadium: Victoria Ground; Attendance: 43,756; Referee: CW Kingston

== Statistics ==
=== Squad statistics ===
No.	Pos	Nat	Player	Total		Football League Division Two		FA Cup		Other	
No.	Pos	Nat	Player	Apps	Goals	Apps	Goals	Apps	Goals	Apps	Goals
	GK	(England) ENG	Peter Taylor	34	0	32	0	2	0	0	0
	DF	(England) ENG	Ray Bilcliff	42	0	40	0	2	0	0	0
	DF	(England) ENG	Brian Phillips	42	0	40	0	2	0	0	0
	DF	(England) ENG	Dicky Robinson	23	0	23	0	0	0	0	0
	MF	(Wales) WAL	Bill Harris	41	3	39	3	2	0	0	0
	MF	(England) ENG	Ronnie Dicks	25	1	25	1	0	0	0	0
	FW	(England) ENG	Ron Burbeck	24	6	24	6	0	0	0	0
	FW	(England) ENG	Derek McLean	36	7	34	7	2	0	0	0
	FW	(England) ENG	Brian Clough	42	43	40	41	2	2	0	0
	FW	(England) ENG	Alan Peacock	24	16	22	14	2	2	0	0
	FW	(England) ENG	Eddie Holliday	24	2	22	1	2	1	0	0
	GK	(England) ENG	Esmond Million	10	0	10	0	0	0	0	0
	FW	(Republic of Ireland) IRL	Arthur Fitzsimons	21	4	21	4	0	0	0	0
	DF	(England) ENG	Joe Birbeck	22	0	20	0	2	0	0	0
	FW	(England) ENG	Billy Day	20	3	18	2	2	1	0	0
	FW	(Jamaica) JAM	Lindy Delapenha	17	0	17	0	0	0	0	0
	DF	(England) ENG	Derek Stonehouse	11	0	11	0	0	0	0	0
	DF	(England) ENG	Tom Brown	12	0	10	0	2	0	0	0
	FW	(England) ENG	Joe Scott	5	0	5	0	0	0	0	0
	MF	(England) ENG	Carl Taylor	4	1	4	1	0	0	0	0
	MF	(England) ENG	Ray Henderson	3	1	3	1	0	0	0	0
	DF	(England) ENG	Frank Mulholland	2	0	2	0	0	0	0	0

- Source: https://www.11v11.com/teams/middlesbrough/tab/matches/season/1958/
