= Statue of Brian Clough =

Statue of Brian Clough may refer to:

- Statue of Brian Clough, Middlesbrough
- Statue of Brian Clough, Nottingham
