= Malcolm Stephens =

English footballer

Personal information
- Full name: Malcolm Keith Stephens
- Date of birth: 17 February 1930
- Place of birth: Doncaster, England
- Date of death: 6 February 2005 (aged 74)
- Place of death: Plymouth, England
- Position: Inside forward

Senior career*
Years	Team	Apps	(Gls)
1954–1957	Brighton & Hove Albion	29	(14)
1957–1958	Rotherham United	12	(3)
1958–1959	Doncaster Rovers	10	(2)
Total		51	(19)
- * Club domestic league appearances and goals

Malcolm Keith Stephens (17 February 1930 – 6 February 2005) was an English professional footballer who played as an inside forward in the Football League for Brighton & Hove Albion, Rotherham United and Doncaster Rovers.

== Life and career ==
Stephens was born in 1930 in Doncaster, which was then in the West Riding of Yorkshire. Described as a "stocky little inside forward", he joined Brighton & Hove Albion straight from his Royal Navy service, and scored at a rate of a goal every other game. However, in competition with Albert Mundy and Denis Foreman, he was unable to establish himself as a first-team regular, and moved on to Rotherham United and then Doncaster Rovers. He died in Plymouth, Devon, in 2005 at the age of 74.
