= Bertie Foreman =

English cricketer (born 2004)

Personal information
- Full name: Albert Michael Foreman
- Born: 13 May 2004 (age 22)
- Batting: Left-handed
- Bowling: Right-arm off break

Domestic team information
- Years: Team
- 2023–2025: Sussex (squad no. 13)
- 2025: → Worcestershire (on loan)
- 2026: Kent
- FC debut: 17 September 2024 Sussex v Gloucestershire
- LA debut: 22 August 2023 Sussex v Worcestershire

Career statistics
Competition	First-class	List A	T20
Matches	5	9	1
Runs scored	124	220	–
Batting average	15.50	31.42	–
100s/50s	0/0	0/0	–/–
Top score	49	48	–
Balls bowled	713	360	12
Wickets	8	6	1
Bowling average	50.00	54.50	25.00
5 wickets in innings	0	0	0
10 wickets in match	0	0	0
Best bowling	2/65	1/31	1/25
Catches/stumpings	6/–	3/–	0/–
- Source: Cricinfo, 27 September 2026

Albert Michael Foreman (born 13 May 2004) is an English cricketer who most recently played for Kent County Cricket Club. He is a right handed off spin bowler and left-handed batsman.

== Early life ==
He played as a youngster for St James's Montefiore in Ditchling. Foreman later played for Horsham Cricket club

== Career ==
He signed a rookie contract with Sussex County Cricket Club in October 2022. In August 2023, he extended his rookie contract with Sussex. He made his List-A cricket debut for Sussex on the 20 August 2023 against Worcester in the 2023 One-Day Cup.

In the winter of 2023-24 he played for Manly Warringahs in NSW Premier Cricket and was awarded the O’Reilly Medal for the first-grade men’s player of the year. He was the leading wicket-taker in the competition with 50 wickets at an average of 17.16 including three five-wicket hauls. He was named player of the match on five occasions throughout the season with best bowling figures of 7-38 against Penrith. With Manly he qualified for the grand final.

He signed a two-year professional contract with Sussex in April 2024. He was released by Sussex at the end of the 2025 season. In May 2026, he signed a two-month contract with Kent.

== International career ==
He made his debut for England Under-19s in August 2022. That year, he featured in two Test matches and one ODI against Sri Lanka Under-19s. Playing for England under-19s at the Allan Border Field on February 1, 2023, he scored 58 not out and took five wickets playing against Australia U19.

== Personal life ==
He is the grandson of former Sussex cricketer and Brighton and Hove Albion footballer Denis Foreman.
