= Statue of Brian Clough, Nottingham =

2008 sculpture

Coordinates: 52°57′15″N 1°08′58″W

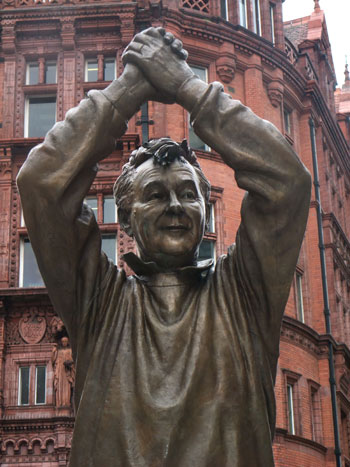

A statue of English football player and manager Brian Clough was unveiled on 6 November 2008 in Nottingham, the city where he was the manager of Nottingham Forest.

== Fundraising ==
As manager of Nottingham Forest, Clough won a league title and two European Cups. He died on 20 September 2004, aged 69. In June 2005, a campaign for funding was initiated, and it reached half of its £60,000 target by March 2006. In December that year, the campaign reached £59,000, along with an additional £5,000 each from Nottingham Forest and Nottingham City Council.

== Design ==
In January 2008, three miniature statues were displayed at Nottingham Council House, for the public to choose the design that would be built at full scale. The winning design, by Les Johnson of Hampshire, depicted Clough with his hands above his head, and would be cast eight foot tall. On 6 November, Clough's widow unveiled the statue. One thousand six-inch miniatures were sold at £100 each, to raise money for charity.

== Subsequent events ==
In May 2009, a 23-year-old vandalised several businesses with spray paint as well as the statue, causing it £200 of damage. He was jailed for 360 days for criminal damage. In October 2022, activists held a silent protest at the statue to draw attention to 5% of statues being of women. The statue was again vandalised in April 2025 with a pro-transgender message, after the For Women Scotland Ltd v The Scottish Ministers decision.
