= Mick McNeil =

English footballer (1940–2025)

Michael McNeil

Personal information
- Date of birth: 7 February 1940
- Place of birth: Middlesbrough, England
- Date of death: 22 October 2025 (aged 85)
- Position: Left-back

Senior career*
Years	Team	Apps	(Gls)
1957–1964	Middlesbrough	178	(3)
1964–1972	Ipswich Town	146	(4)
1972–1976	Cambridge City		
Total		324	(7)

International career
1960–1961	England	9	(0)
- * Club domestic league appearances and goals

Michael McNeil (7 February 1940 – 22 October 2025) was an English footballer who played as a left-back for Middlesbrough and Ipswich Town. He made nine appearances for England in 1960 and 1961. During his career he made 178 Football League appearances for Middlesbrough and almost 150 appearances for Ipswich Town.

== Playing career ==
McNeil was born in Middlesbrough; after leaving school, the Middlesbrough Boys player was studying to become an analytical chemist. He was spotted by Middlesbrough coach Jimmy Gordon and he signed for Boro.

He made his Middlesbrough debut aged 18, in a game versus Brighton, in which Boro won 6–4. He soon lost his place, but the next season he moved to left-back and made the position his own, retaining it for the next two seasons. Despite Middlesbrough being in the Second Division, McNeil was called up by the England national team, having already represented the under-23 side. He was only 21 when he won his last cap.

The emergence of other talents at Middlesbrough, including left-back Gordon Jones, saw McNeil shuffled around the defensive line to central defence, and then to right-back, before Cyril Knowles' arrival saw him retake his former position at left-back.

Following 193 appearances and 3 goals in all competitions, McNeil's sale to Ipswich Town in 1964 was greeted with derision by the fans, having also lost Alan Peacock and Knowles recently. However, McNeil had suffered injuries of late, and had disagreements with manager Raich Carter, causing him to hand in a transfer request.

While at Ipswich, McNeil won promotion. In 1971, in his early 30s, he quit the game to set up a highly successful sports outfitters in Bury St Edmunds.

== Death ==
On 23 October 2025, it was announced by Middlesbrough F.C. and Ipswich Town F.C. that McNeil had died earlier that week. He was 85.
