= Billy Horner =

English footballer and manager

Personal information
- Full name: William Horner
- Date of birth: 7 September 1942 (age 84)
- Place of birth: Cassop, England
- Height: 5 ft 8 in (1.73 m)
- Position: Central defender

Senior career*
Years	Team	Apps	(Gls)
1960–1969	Middlesbrough	187	(11)
1969–1975	Darlington	218	(5)

Managerial career
- 1974–1975: Darlington
- 1976–1983: Hartlepool United
- 1984–1986: Hartlepool United
- * Club domestic league appearances and goals

William Horner (born 7 September 1942 in Cassop, England) is an English footballer and manager.

Horner played at Middlesbrough from 1960 to 1969, primarily as a defender. He moved on to Darlington where he played until 1975.

He joined York City as a coach in 1971 under Tom Johnston and was released in January 1972 following a behind the scenes player's dispute.

He was player-manager of Darlington during the 1974–75 season, in which the club had to apply for re-election. He left the club at the end of the season and was appointed as coach to Darlington's arch-rivals Hartlepool. In October 1976, he took over as manager, and had two separate spells in this role: one from 1976 to 1983 and the other from 1983 to 1986. Although Hartlepool applied for re-election to the League on three occasions, Horner also guided the club to a respectable 9th-place finish in 1980–81, during which the club had been promotion contenders. In his second spell at the club, Hartlepool finished 7th in 1985–86, in which they had also been a promotion contender for much of the season.

== Managerial stats ==
Team	From	To	Record				
Team	From	To	G	W	L	D	Win %
Darlington	August 1974	May 1975	46	13	23	10	28.3
Hartlepool United	October 1976	March 1983	307	95	135	77	30.9
Hartlepool United	December 1983	November 1986	94	30	43	21	31.9
