= Brian Clough =

English football player and manager (1935–2004)

Brian Clough OBE
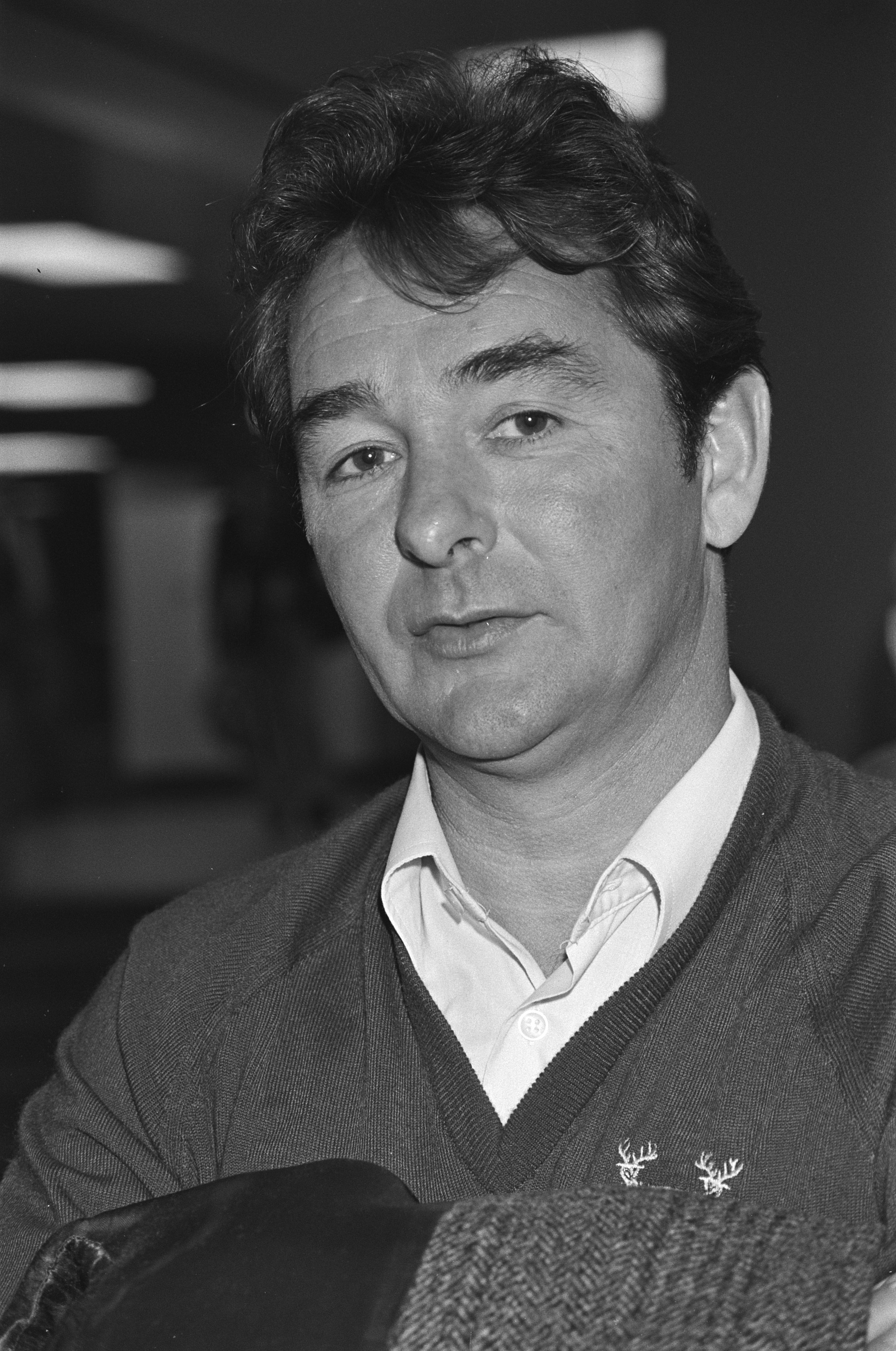
- Clough as Nottingham Forest manager in 1980

Personal information
- Full name: Brian Howard Clough
- Date of birth: 21 March 1935
- Place of birth: Middlesbrough, England
- Date of death: 20 September 2004 (aged 69)
- Place of death: Derby, England
- Height: 5 ft 10 in (1.78 m)
- Position: Striker

Youth career
- 1951–1953: Middlesbrough
- 1953–1955: Billingham Synthonia

Senior career*
| Years | Team | Apps | (Gls) |
| 1955–1961 | Middlesbrough | 213 | (197) |
| 1961–1964 | Sunderland | 61 | (54) |
| Total | | 274 | (251) |

International career
| 1957–1958 | England U23 | 3 | (1) |
| 1957 | England B | 1 | (1) |
| 1959 | England | 2 | (0) |

Managerial career
- 1965–1967: Hartlepools United
- 1967–1973: Derby County
- 1973–1974: Brighton & Hove Albion
- 1974: Leeds United
- 1975–1993: Nottingham Forest
- * Club domestic league appearances and goals

Brian Howard Clough (/klʌf/ KLUF; 21 March 1935 – 20 September 2004) was an English football player and manager, primarily known for his successes as a manager with Derby County and Nottingham Forest. He won the European Cup twice with Nottingham Forest and is one of four managers to have won the English league with two different clubs. He is widely regarded as one of the greatest managers of all time. Charismatic, outspoken and often controversial, his achievements with Derby and Forest, two clubs with little prior history of success, are rated among the greatest in football history. His teams were also noted for playing attractive football and for their good sportsmanship. Despite applying several times and being a popular choice for the job, he was never appointed England manager and has been dubbed the "greatest manager England never had".

Clough played as a striker for Middlesbrough and Sunderland, scoring 251 league goals in 274 matches; he remains one of the Football League's highest goalscorers. He won two England caps. He entered management after his playing career was ended by a serious injury at the age of 29. As a manager, Clough was closely associated with Peter Taylor, who served as his assistant manager at several clubs in the 1960s, 1970s and 1980s. He is also remembered for giving frequent radio and television interviews in which he made controversial remarks about players, other managers and the overall state of the game. In 1965, he took the manager's job at Fourth Division Hartlepools United and appointed Peter Taylor as his assistant, the start of an enduring partnership that would bring them success at several clubs over the next two decades. In 1967, the duo moved on to Second Division Derby County who, in 1968–69, were promoted as Second Division champions and, three years later, crowned champions of England for the first time in the club's history. In 1973, they reached the semi-finals of the European Cup. By this point, Clough's relationship with chairman Sam Longson had deteriorated; he and Taylor resigned.

An eight-month spell in charge of Third Division club Brighton & Hove Albion followed, before Clough (without Taylor) returned north in the summer of 1974 to become manager of Leeds United. This was widely regarded as a surprise appointment, given his previous outspoken criticism of the Leeds players and their manager Don Revie. He was sacked after just 44 days in the job, but within months, he had joined Second Division Nottingham Forest, where he was re-united with Taylor in the summer of 1976. In 1977, Forest were promoted to the top flight and the following season won the league title (the first and so far only in the club's history), making Clough one of only four managers to have won the English league with two clubs. Forest also won two consecutive European Cups (in 1979 and 1980) and two League Cups (1978 and 1979), before Taylor retired in 1982. Clough stayed on as Forest manager for another decade, winning two more League Cups (1989 and 1990) and reaching the FA Cup final in 1991, but could not emulate his earlier successes. Forest were relegated from the Premier League in 1993, after which Clough retired from football. In 2002, Clough was among the six managers who were inaugural inductees into the English Football Hall of Fame.

== Early life ==
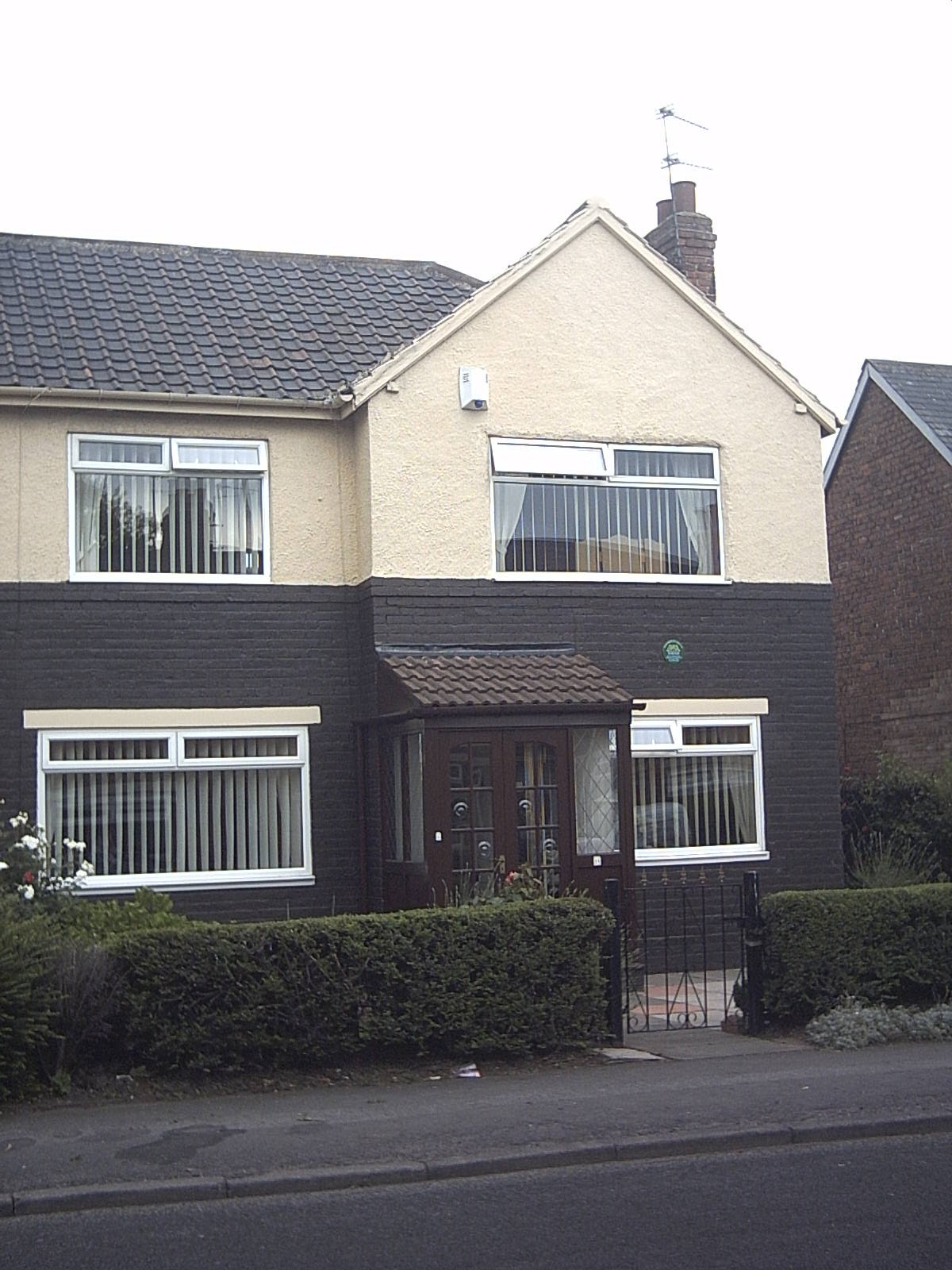
Clough's birthplace house, 11 Valley Road, in Grove Hill, Middlesbrough

Brian Howard Clough was born on 21 March 1935 at 11 Valley Road, an inter-war council house in Grove Hill, Middlesbrough, North Riding of Yorkshire, He was the sixth of nine children of a local sweet shop worker, later sugar boiler and then manager. The eldest, Elizabeth, died on 11 February 1927 of septicaemia at the age of three. When talking of his childhood he said he "adored it in all its aspects. If anyone should be grateful for their upbringing, for their mam and dad, I'm that person. I was the kid who came from a little part of paradise." On his upbringing in Middlesbrough, Clough claimed that it was "not the most well-appointed place in the world, but to me it was heaven". "Everything I have done, everything I've achieved, everything that I can think of that has directed and affected my life – apart from the drink – stemmed from my childhood. Maybe it was the constant sight of Mam, with eight children to look after, working from morning until night, working harder than you or I have ever worked."

Clough failed his Eleven-plus examination and attended Marton Grove Secondary Modern School. He later admitted in his autobiography, Walking on Water, that he had neglected his lessons in favour of sport, although at school he became Head Boy. He also said that cricket, rather than football, was his first love as a youngster, and that he would have rather scored a test century at Lord's than a hat-trick at Wembley. He left school in 1950 without any qualifications, to work at ICI and did his national service in the RAF Regiment between 1953 and 1955.

== Playing career ==
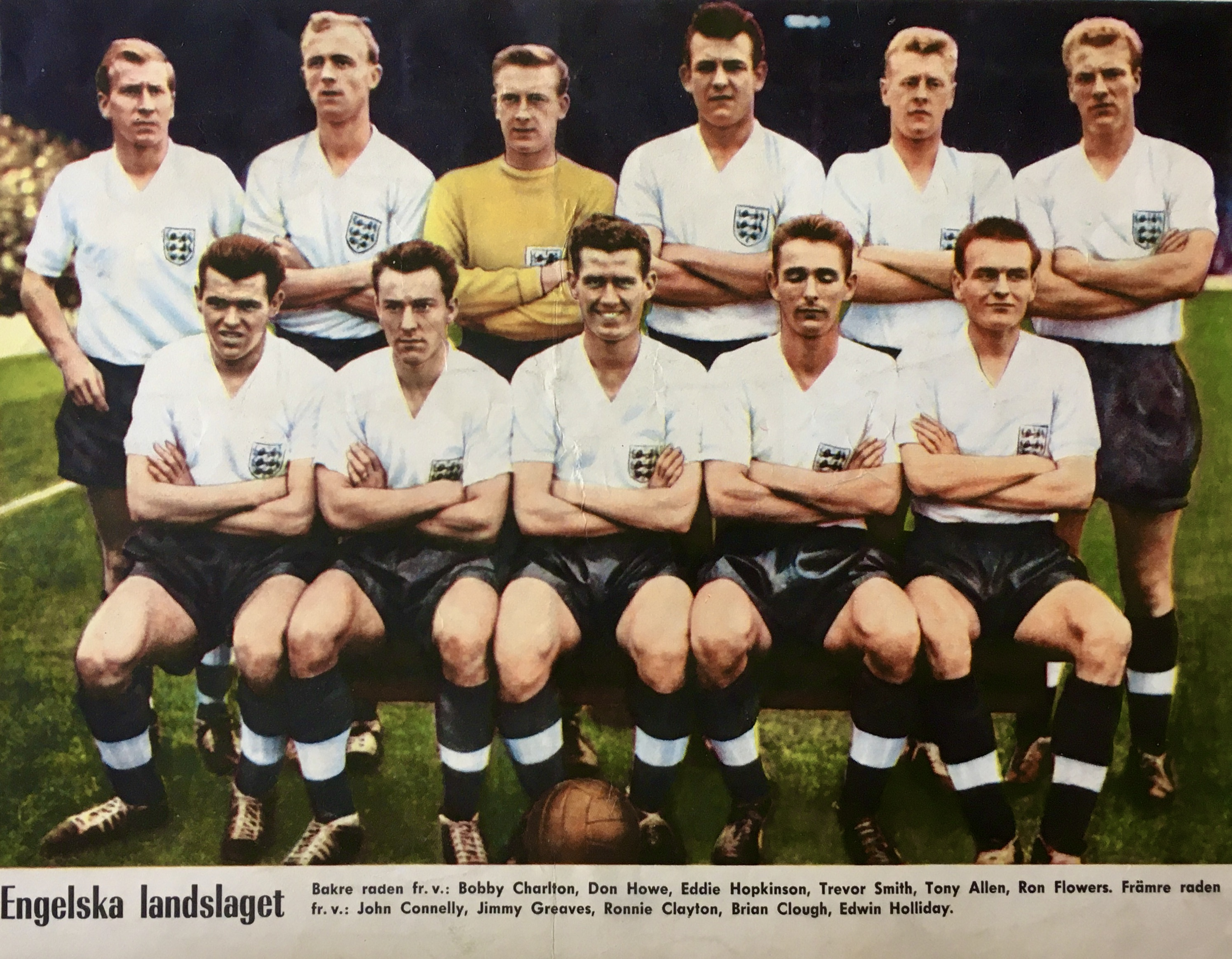
Clough (seated, second from right) with the England national football team at Wembley Stadium, 28 October 1959.

"I played with some great players and I think Cloughie was a great finisher. He was a powerful lad and both his timing and positional play were excellent. You placed him in that bracket as Roger Hunt, but in more modern terms he was very similar to Mark Hughes when it came to volleying. The one thing, right or wrong, that he insisted on was that he played down the middle because, he reasoned, that was where he scored, not out wide so why should I run wide. That was his only failing. When he played for England he wanted people to play like Boro did but when you've got people around like Bobby Charlton and Jimmy Greaves, you can't tell those guys I will just stop in the middle."

— Clough's Middlesbrough teammate Alan Peacock.

Clough played for Great Broughton Juniors and, while working for ICI, Billingham Synthonia (scoring three goals in four games) before his national service in the RAF between 1953 and 1955. He combined playing football in the forces, though he was never selected for the RAF National team, and playing for the Boro third team when on leave.

=== Middlesbrough ===
Following this, he became a prolific striker for his home town club Middlesbrough since his debut in the 1955–56 season and an impressive 1956–57 season now as starter, scoring 204 goals in 222 league matches for Boro, including 40 or more goals in four consecutive seasons, being Division Two topscorer in two of them: 1958–59 and 1959–60. However, Clough also regularly submitted transfer requests since the 1957–58 season and had a tense relationship with some of his fellow players. He was especially irked by Boro's leaky defence, which conceded goals as regularly as he scored them. In the 1960–61 season after a 6–6 draw against Charlton Athletic, Clough sarcastically asked his teammates how many goals they would have to score in order to win a match. He also publicly accused some of his teammates of betting against the team and deliberately letting in goals. While at Middlesbrough, Clough became acquainted with goalkeeper Peter Taylor, with whom he would later form a successful managerial partnership at several clubs.

=== Sunderland ===
In July 1961, one of Clough's transfer requests was finally accepted and he moved to Boro's local rivals Sunderland for £55,000 scoring 34 goals in the 1961–62 season. With Sunderland, Clough scored a total of 63 goals in 74 matches. In the 1962–63 season, Clough had scored 24 league goals by December as Sunderland pushed for promotion. In a match against Bury at Roker Park on 26 December 1962, in icy conditions and torrential rain, Clough was put through on goal and collided with goalkeeper, Chris Harker. Clough tore the medial and cruciate ligaments in his knee, an injury which in that era usually ended a player's career. He returned two years later, but could manage only three games and then retired from playing at the age of 29.

Clough's manager at Sunderland was Alan Brown, a disciplinarian credited as a big influence on Clough. Brown inspired fear, imposed a strict code of conduct and would fine players for minor transgressions. He once upbraided Clough for talking to a friend during a training session. Such traits would later be adopted by Clough himself when he became a manager.

Of the players who have scored over 200 goals in the English leagues, Clough has the highest goals-per-game ratio of 0.916, and has the second highest ratio in the list that includes the Scottish leagues.

=== England ===
Clough played twice for the England national football team, against Wales on 17 October 1959 and Sweden on 28 October 1959, without scoring, although hitting the crossbar and post against Sweden.

== Management career ==
=== Hartlepools United ===
After a short spell coaching the Sunderland youth team, in October 1965, Clough was offered the manager's job at Hartlepools United (from 1977 the club became known as Hartlepool United). He accepted and immediately asked Peter Taylor (then managing non-league Burton Albion) to join him as his assistant. At the age of 30, Clough was then the youngest manager in the league. Hartlepools were perennial strugglers and had repeatedly had to apply for re-election to the Football League, having finished in the bottom two of the Fourth Division five times in the past six seasons. Such was the club's perilous financial state in the 1965–66 season, Clough had to tour local pubs raising money to keep the club afloat and even applied for a coach driver's licence to drive the team to away matches.

On 15 November 1966, the then chairman, Ernest Ord, who was known for playing mind games with managers, sacked Clough's assistant Peter Taylor, claiming he could not afford to pay him anymore. Clough refused to accept it so Ord sacked him as well. However, there was a boardroom coup where the other board members refused to ratify the two sackings and which instead saw Ord ousted as chairman. Both Clough and Taylor were reinstated. Hartlepools' fortunes gradually improved and the club finished in a creditable eighth place in 1966–67. Their Hartlepools team featured three players who would play for Clough and Taylor at other clubs in the future: Les Green, who would be goalkeeper in Derby's promotion-winning side of 1969, Tony Parry who Clough signed for Derby in 1972 in what is seen as a helpful gesture to his former club who needed funds from transfers and a 16-year-old John McGovern, who would later be signed by Clough at Derby County, Leeds United and Nottingham Forest, winning several major trophies in the process. On 14 May 1967, the two men then joined Second Division side Derby County as manager and assistant manager. They took charge on 1 June 1967. In the following season, Hartlepools were promoted for the first time in their history.

=== Derby County ===
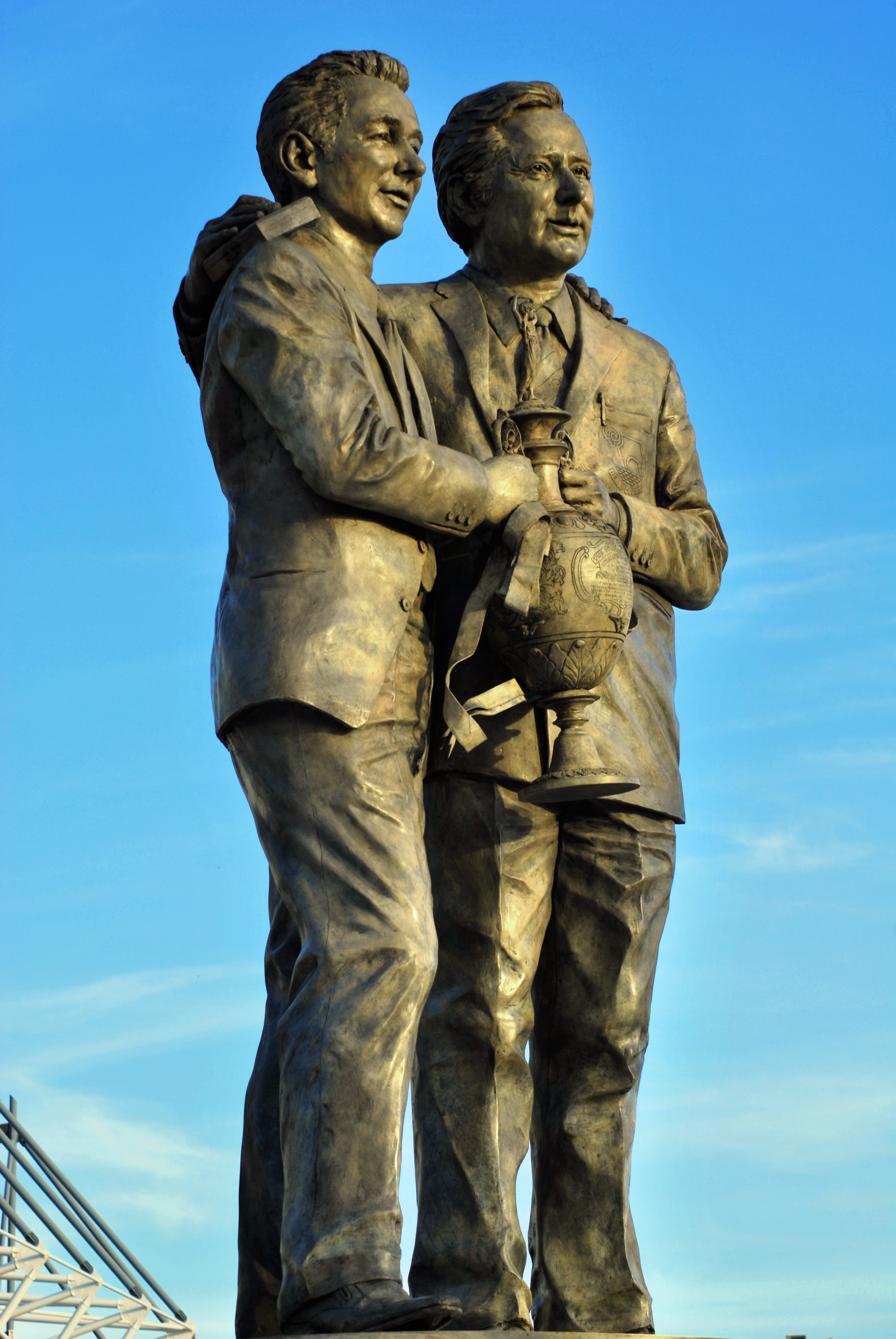
Brian Clough and Peter Taylor Statue at Pride Park

Derby County had been rooted in the Second Division for a decade before Clough's arrival, and had been outside the top flight for a further five years, their only major trophy being the FA Cup in 1946.

In Clough's first season, the club finished one place lower than in the previous season, but he had started to lay the foundations for his future success by signing several new players, among them Roy McFarland, John O'Hare, John McGovern, Alan Hinton and Les Green. Of the inherited squad, 11 players departed and only four were retained: Kevin Hector, Alan Durban, Ron Webster and Colin Boulton. Clough also sacked the club secretary, the groundsman and the chief scout, along with two tea ladies he caught laughing after a Derby defeat. With the additional signings of Dave Mackay and Willie Carlin in 1968–69, Clough and Taylor's management led Derby to become champions of the Second Division, establishing the club record of 22 matches without defeat on the way and the team was promoted to the First Division for the 1969–70 season.

Clough was universally seen as a hard but fair manager, who insisted on clean play from his players and brooked no stupid questions from the press. He insisted on being called "Boss" and earned great respect from his peers for his ability to turn a game to his and his team's advantage. Derby's first season back in the First Division saw them finish fourth, their best league finish for over twenty years, but, due to financial irregularities, the club was banned from Europe the following season and fined £10,000.

In 1970–71, the club finished ninth. In February 1971, Clough bolstered his squad by signing Colin Todd for a British record £175,000 on the same day Clough had denied that Derby were about to buy Todd. In the 1971–72 season, after tussling with Liverpool, Leeds United and Manchester City for the title, Derby finally topped the league table by one point after playing their final match, a 1–0 win over Liverpool. Manchester City did temporarily top the league after playing their last match, but had a slim chance of winning the title due to outstanding fixtures between the clubs directly below them. Peter Taylor took the players on holiday to Mallorca as the clubs beneath them played their final matches. Clough was not with the squad, instead holidaying in the Isles of Scilly with his family and elderly parents. Both Liverpool and Leeds United had a chance to overtake Derby by winning their final matches (played a week later due to fixture congestion) but Leeds lost to Wolves and Liverpool drew at Arsenal, meaning Derby were league champions for the first time in their 88-year history. The team and management were on holiday when receiving the news they were champions.

==== Feud with the Derby County board of directors ====
On 27 April 1972, less than two weeks before taking Derby to the league title, Clough and Taylor had briefly resigned for a few hours to manage Coventry City before changing their minds after Longson offered them more money. In August, Clough refused to go on an arranged pre-season tour of the Netherlands and West Germany unless he could take his family with him. Longson told him that it was a working trip and not a holiday, so Clough put Taylor in charge of the tour instead and refused to go. The club did not contest the FA Charity Shield that year.

On 24 August 1972, Clough and Taylor signed David Nish from Leicester City for a then-record transfer fee of £225,000, without consulting the Derby board. Afterwards, Jack Kirkland, a director, warned Clough and Taylor there would be no more expensive buys like Nish. Then, in early September 1972, after the team had defeated Liverpool 2–1 at the Baseball Ground, Clough criticised the Derby County fans, stating that "They started chanting only near the end when we were a goal in front. I want to hear them when we are losing. They are a disgraceful lot". In the same interview, Clough also verbally attacked the club's board of directors for their policies. The following day, board chairman Sam Longson apologised to the fans and dissociated himself from Clough's remarks.

That 1972–73 season, Derby failed to retain their title, finishing seventh, but reached the semi-finals of the European Cup in April 1973, when they were knocked out by Juventus 3–1 on aggregate. During the first leg in Turin, Clough was aggrieved by the performance of the match referee, whom he believed had been influenced and possibly bribed to favour the Italian side. After the game, Clough refused to speak to the Italian reporters, saying: "No cheating bastards do I talk to. I will not talk to any cheating bastards". He instructed Brian Glanville to translate what he had said to them and questioned the Italian nation's courage in the Second World War.

It was these sorts of frequent, outspoken comments – particularly against football's establishment, such as the FA and club directors, and figures in the game such as Matt Busby, Alan Hardaker, Alf Ramsey, Don Revie and Len Shipman, along with players such as Billy Bremner, Norman Hunter and Peter Lorimer – combined with Clough's increased media profile, that eventually led to his falling out with the Rams' chairman, Sam Longson, and the Derby County board of directors. Longson, who agreed with Revie's sentiments on Clough after the Leeds manager said "We all know that he can walk on water. If he is not criticising Sir Alf Ramsey it has to be somebody else", said if Clough wants to get out of football and speak his mind "I will not stand in his way".

On 5 August 1973, Clough put his name to an article in the Sunday Express headlined "I Would Put Leeds in Division Two – Brian Clough lashes Soccer's bosses for letting off Don Revie's 'bad boys,'" which savaged Leeds United's disciplinary record, stating that Revie should be fined for encouraging his players in their unsporting behaviour and Leeds relegated to the Second Division. Clough also said that "The men who run football have missed the most marvellous chance of cleaning up the game in one swoop" and went on to say "The trouble with football's disciplinary system is that those who sat in judgement being officials of other clubs might well have a vested interest." Revie had been fined £3000, effectively a suspended fine as it would not be collected if Leeds improved their disciplinary record, which enraged Clough, who likened the light punishment to "breathalysing a drunken driver, getting a positive reading, giving him the keys back and telling him to watch it on his way home".

Days afterwards, Clough was charged with bringing the game into disrepute, but he was cleared on 14 November after he had later resigned from Derby. In September 1973, Clough travelled to West Ham United's Upton Park and personally made a £400,000 bid for Bobby Moore, a player he long admired, and Trevor Brooking. West Ham manager Ron Greenwood informed Clough that neither was available but that he would pass his offer onto the West Ham board of directors anyway. Clough never told Derby's chairman, secretary or any other board members at Derby about the bid. Longson found out four months later during a chance conversation with Eddie Chapman, West Ham's secretary at the time, but by then Clough was no longer the Derby County manager.

==== Resignation from Derby County ====
During the 1973–74 season, on 11 October 1973, Longson called for the sackings of both Clough and Taylor at a board meeting, but did not gain the support that was needed. Earlier that week, Longson had demanded that Clough stop writing newspaper articles and making television appearances, and prohibited both Clough and Taylor drinking alcohol on Derby County premises. Two days later, following a 1–0 win against Manchester United at Old Trafford, club director Jack Kirkland demanded to know what Taylor's exact role within the club was, and instructed Taylor to meet him at the ground two days later to explain. On the same day, Longson accused Clough of making a V-sign at Matt Busby and chairman Louis Edwards and demanded that he apologise. Clough refused, and admitted later that he did make a V-sign, but it was aimed at Longson, not Busby or Edwards: he blamed Longson for providing too few tickets and seating for players' and staff's wives, including his own and Taylor's.

Clough and Taylor hoped to oust Longson as chairman, as they had done with Ord seven years earlier, but failed. Both Clough and Taylor resigned on the evening of 15 October 1973, and the resignation was accepted by Sam Longson the following morning, to widespread uproar from Rams fans, who demanded the board's resignation along with Clough and Taylor's reinstatement at the following home game against Leicester City four days later. That evening, Clough appeared on Parkinson and attacked football directors for their apparent "lack of knowledge" of football.

That week, Clough, as a television football pundit, memorably called Poland goalkeeper Jan Tomaszewski a "circus clown in gloves" before the crucial World Cup qualifier with England at Wembley. The match, which England had to win in order to qualify for the 1974 World Cup finals, ended 1–1, and Tomaszewski made numerous magnificent saves, some of them unconventionally, to ensure his nation qualified for the finals at England's expense. At half-time Clough had said, "Keep calm. Put the kettle on, mother. Don't worry — the goals are going to come". At full-time the commentator Brian Moore quizzed Clough on his comments on the Polish goalkeeper, "You call him a clown, Brian, but he saved his side", Clough insisted "Would you want him in your team every week?" Tomaszewski revealed he and Clough met years later, and that "Clough apologised for what he had said about me. We shook hands and I said thank you, because only great people can admit to mistakes."

The six years at Derby County had brought Clough to the attention of the wider football world. According to James Lawton, "Derby was the wild making of Brian Clough. He went there a young and urgent manager who had done impressive work deep in his own little corner of the world at Hartlepools. He left surrounded by fascination and great celebrity: abrasive, infuriating, but plugged, immovably, into a vein of the nation."

=== Brighton & Hove Albion ===
Such was the loyalty to Clough that, along with himself and Taylor, scouts and backroom staff completed the walk out, following the pair for their brief spell with Brighton & Hove Albion. He proved less successful on the south coast than with his previous club, winning only 12 of his 32 games in charge of the Third Division side. Whereas nineteen months earlier he led Derby County to the league title and eight months earlier Clough was managing a team playing Juventus in the European Cup, he was now managing a club who, just after his appointment as manager, lost to non-league Walton & Hersham 4–0 at home in an FA Cup replay. On 1 December 1973, his side lost 8–2 at home to Bristol Rovers. Brighton eventually finished in 19th place that 1973–74 season.

=== Leeds United ===
Clough left Brighton less than a year after his appointment, in July 1974, to become manager of Leeds United, following Don Revie's departure to become manager of England, though this time Taylor did not join him. Clough's move was very surprising given his previous outspoken criticism of both Revie, for whom Clough made no secret of his deep disdain, and the successful Leeds team's playing style, which Clough had publicly branded "dirty" and "cheating". Furthermore, he had called for Leeds to be demoted to the Second Division as a punishment for their poor disciplinary record.

He lasted in the job only 44 days before he was sacked by the Leeds directors on 12 September 1974, after alienating many of Leeds' star players. During one of the first training sessions he took for Leeds United, he reportedly said "You can all throw your medals in the bin because they were won by cheating." Until Darko Milanič's winless six games in 2014, he had the unenviable record of being Leeds United's least successful permanent manager, winning only one match from six games. Leeds were fourth from bottom in 19th position with only four points from a possible twelve, their worst start since their last relegation campaign fifteen years earlier. His pay-off was estimated at £98,000, a huge amount at the time.

On the evening of his dismissal, Clough discussed his short reign at Elland Road with Yorkshire Television's Calendar news programme. Revie also participated in the live broadcast, the two ex-managers spending as much time debating management practice with each other as with the host Austin Mitchell. Describing this televised interview as the culmination of the bitter rivalry between the two men, journalist Roger Hermiston stated: "It was like watching a bickering couple about to get a divorce."

=== Nottingham Forest ===
Clough replaced Allan Brown as manager of Nottingham Forest on 6 January 1975, just over sixteen weeks after the end of his 44-day tenure as manager of Leeds United. Clough brought Jimmy Gordon to be his club trainer, as Gordon had been for him at Derby and Leeds. Forest won Clough's first game in charge, an FA Cup third round replay against Tottenham Hotspur, with Scottish centre-forward Neil Martin scoring the only goal.

Ian Bowyer was already at Forest and had won domestic and European trophies with Manchester City. Clough signed Scottish duo John McGovern and John O'Hare in February from Leeds United, having been bought by Clough the previous year during his ill-fated 44-day managerial stint there; both players had been part of Clough's title-winning team at Derby. He then brought John Robertson and Martin O'Neill back into the fold after they had requested transfers under Brown. Viv Anderson had previously made his debut for the first team and became a regular under Clough. Tony Woodcock, early in his career, was at Forest but was then unrated by Clough and was to be loaned to Lincoln City. Forest were 13th in English football's second tier when Clough joined. They finished 16th at the end of the season. Forest signed Frank Clark in July 1975 on a free transfer. The following 1975–76 season, Forest finished eighth in Clough's first full season in charge. It was in this season Clough made McGovern long standing club captain, taking over from a game in which Bob Chapman and Liam O'Kane were both injured.

On 16 July 1976, Peter Taylor re-joined Clough as his Assistant Manager, which he had been when winning the league at Derby. Taylor included being the club's talent spotter in his role. After assessing the players Taylor told Clough "that was a feat by you to finish eighth in the Second Division because some of them are only Third Division players". Taylor berated John Robertson for allowing himself to become overweight and disillusioned. He got Robertson on a diet and training regime that would help him become a European Cup winner. Taylor turned Woodcock from a reserve midfielder into a 42-cap England striker. In September 1976, he bought striker Peter Withe to Forest for £43,000, selling him to Newcastle United for £250,000 two years later. Withe was eventually replaced in the starting team by Garry Birtles who Taylor had scouted playing for non-league Long Eaton United. Birtles also went on to represent England. In October 1976, Clough, acting on Peter Taylor's advice, signed Larry Lloyd for £60,000 after an initial loan period.

Together Clough and Taylor took Forest to new heights. The first trophy of the Clough and Taylor reign was the 1976–77 Anglo-Scottish Cup. Forest defeated Orient 5–1 on aggregate in the two-legged final played in December 1976. Clough valued winning a derided trophy as the club's first silverware since 1959. He said, "Those who said it was a nothing trophy were absolutely crackers. We'd won something, and it made all the difference."

On 7 May, Alan Moore's own goal meant Forest in their last league game of the season defeated Millwall 1–0 at the City Ground. This kept Forest in the third promotion spot in the league table and dependent on Bolton Wanderers dropping points in three games in hand in the fight for third place. On 14 May Kenny Hibbitt's goal from his rehearsed free kick routine with Willie Carr gave Wolves a 1–0 win at Bolton. Bolton's defeat reached the Forest team mid-air en route to an end of 1976–77 season break in Mallorca. Forest's third place promotion from the Second Division was the fifth-lowest points tally of any promoted team in history, 52 (two points for a win in England until 1981).

Taylor secretly followed Kenny Burns and concluded Burns' reputation as a hard drinker and gambler was exaggerated. Taylor sanctioned his £150,000 July signing. Burns became FWA Footballer of the Year in 1977–78 after being moved from centre-forward to centre-back. On 20 August 1977, Forest started their return to the top league campaign with a 3–1 win at Everton. Following the game there was a knock on the dressing room door, as recalled by John McGovern:

"That dressing room was usually sacrosanct. Clough wouldn't even let in the chairman, but when he swung open the door his face changed. 'Come in,' he said, 'delighted to see you.' We couldn't see who it was at first, but he said it like it must be the pope or the prime minister. 'Bill, I’m just giving them a rollicking, telling them how poor they were, but I think you should do it.’ And it was Bill Shankly. Clough sat down with the rest of us and suddenly it was Shankly, this legend of the game, giving the team-talk for the next 15 minutes, with his hands in his pockets, in the classic gunslinger pose."

Bill Shankly, retired from management since 1974, and Clough had enormous mutual respect for each other, and impressed by the Forest display at Goodison, Shankly told their players: "You can win it. Don't just be in the First Division, go and win it. Keep playing like that and you can win the championship." Three further wins in league and cup followed without conceding a goal. Then came five early September goals conceded in losing 3–0 at Arsenal and defeating Wolves 3–2 at home. Peter Shilton then signed for a record fee for a goalkeeper of £325,000. Taylor reasoned: "Shilton wins you matches." 20 year old John Middleton was first team goalkeeper pre-Shilton. Middleton later in the month went in part exchange with £25,000 to Derby County for Archie Gemmill transferring to Forest. Gemmill was another Scottish former 1972 Derby title winner.

Forest lost only three of their first sixteen league games, the last of which was at Leeds United on 19 November 1977. They lost only one further game all season, an 11 March FA Cup sixth round defeat at West Bromwich Albion. Forest won the 1977–78 Football League, seven points ahead of runners-up Liverpool. Forest became one of the few teams (and the most recent team to date) to win the First Division title the season after winning promotion from the Second Division. (Note: The others were Liverpool in 1906, Everton in 1932, Tottenham Hotspur in 1951 and Ipswich Town in 1962. Forest remain the only club to achieve this feat having not been promoted as champions.) This made Clough the third of four managers to win the English league championship with two different clubs. (Note: The others are Tom Watson, Herbert Chapman and Kenny Dalglish.) Forest conceded just 24 goals in 42 league games. They defeated Liverpool 1–0 in the 1978 Football League Cup final replay, despite cup-tied Shilton, Gemmill and December signing David Needham not playing. Chris Woods chalked up two clean sheets in the final covering Shilton's league cup absence. McGovern missed the replay through injury, and Burns lifted the trophy as the stand-in captain. Robertson's penalty was the only goal of the game.

Forest started season 1978–79 by defeating Ipswich Town 5–0 for an FA Community Shield record win. In the 1978–79 European Cup they were drawn to play the trophy winners of the two previous seasons, Liverpool. Home goals by Birtles and Colin Barrett put Forest through 2–0 on aggregate. On 9 December 1978 Liverpool ended Forest's 42 match undefeated league run dating back to the November the year before. The undefeated run was the equivalent of a whole season, surpassing the previous record of 35 games held by Burnley in 1920–21. The record stood until it was surpassed by Arsenal in August 2004, a month before Clough's death. Arsenal played 49 league games without defeat.

In February 1979, Taylor authorised the English game's first £1 million transfer, signing Trevor Francis from Birmingham City. In the April European Cup semi final home first leg against 1. FC Köln, Forest were two goals behind after twenty minutes. Forest scored three to edge ahead, but Köln equalised. Thus the German side started the second leg ahead on the away goals rule. Ian Bowyer's goal, the only one of the game, put Forest through. Günter Netzer asked afterwards, "Who is this McGovern? I have never heard of him, yet he ran the game." Forest defeated Malmö 1–0 in Munich's Olympiastadion in the 1979 European Cup final. Francis on his European debut scored with a back post header from Robertson's cross. In addition, Forest defeated Southampton in the final 3–2 to retain the League Cup. Birtles scored twice, and Woodcock once. Forest finished second in the 1978–79 Football League, eight points behind Liverpool.

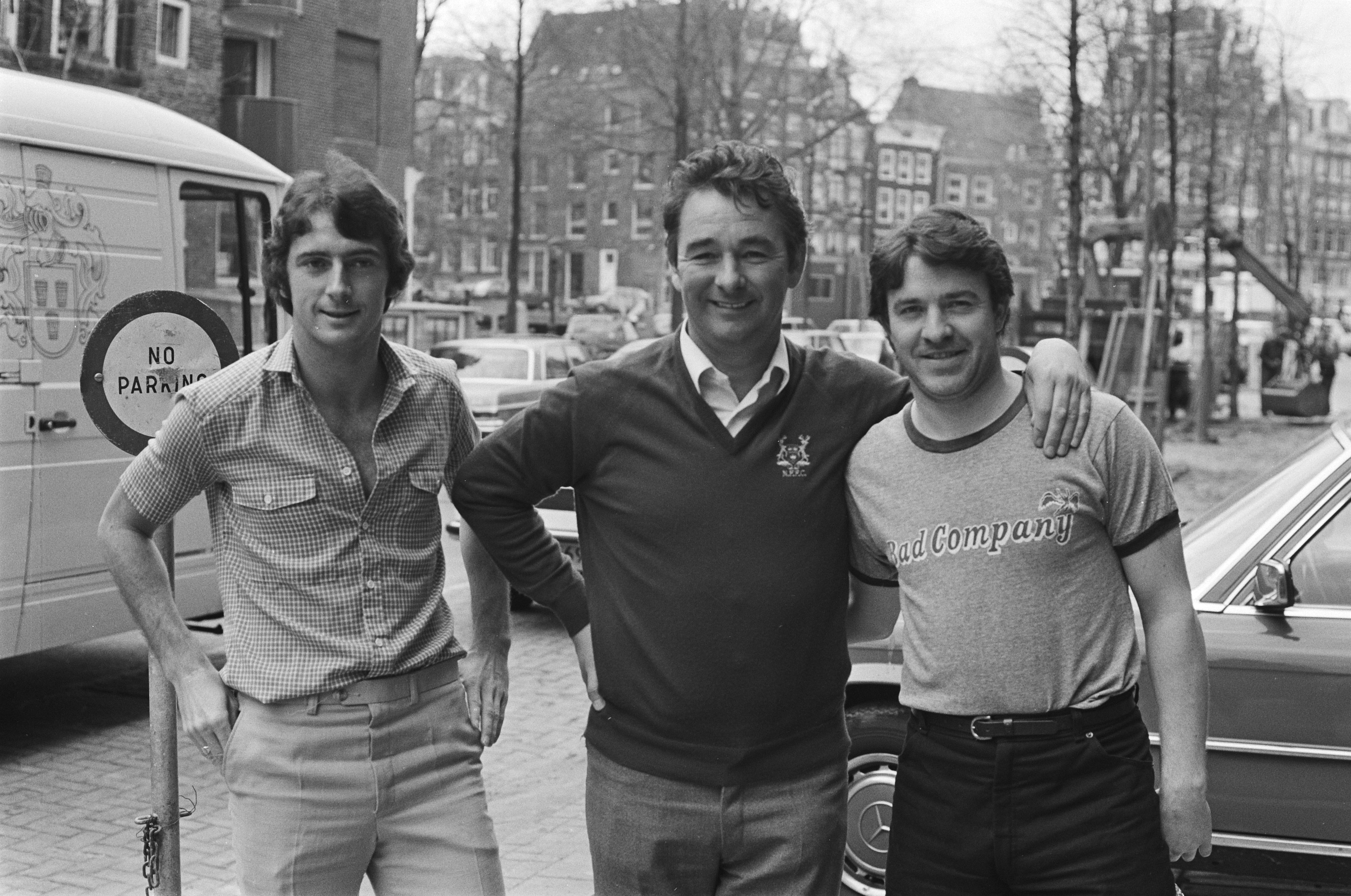
Trevor Francis, Clough and John Robertson in 1980

In the 1979–80 season Forest declined to play in the home and away 1979 Intercontinental Cup against Paraguay's Club Olimpia. Forest defeated F.C. Barcelona 2–1 on aggregate in the 1979 European Super Cup in January and February 1980. Charlie George scored the only goal in the home first leg. Burns scored an equaliser in the return in Spain. In the 1979–80 Football League Cup, Forest reached a third successive final. A defensive mix up between Needham and Shilton let Wolves' Andy Gray tap in to an empty net. Forest missed numerous scoring chances and lost 1–0. In the 1979–80 European Cup quarter final, Forest won 3–1 at Dynamo Berlin to overturn a 1–0 home defeat. In the semi-final they defeated Ajax 2–1 on aggregate. They defeated Hamburg 1–0 in the 1980 European Cup final at Madrid's Santiago Bernabéu Stadium to retain the trophy. Robertson scored after exchanging passes with Birtles. Forest finished fifth in the 1979–80 Football League.

The next 1980–81 season in the European Cup first round, Forest lost 2–0 on aggregate, losing 1–0 both at home and away to CSKA Sofia. McGovern subsequently said the double defeat by CSKA affected the team's self-confidence, in that they had lost out to "modestly talented" opponents. Forest lost the 1980 European Super Cup on away goals after a 2–2 aggregate draw against Valencia, with Bowyer scoring both Forest goals in the home first leg. On 11 February 1981, Forest lost 1–0 in the 1980 Intercontinental Cup against Uruguayan side Club Nacional de Football. The match was played for the first time at the neutral venue National Stadium in Tokyo before 62,000 fans.

The League and European Cup winning squad was broken up to capitalise on player sale value. Clough and Taylor both later said this was a mistake. The rebuilt side, comprising youngsters and signings such as Ian Wallace, Raimondo Ponte and Justin Fashanu, did not challenge for trophies. Taylor said in 1982,

"For many weeks now I don't believe I've been doing justice to the partnership and I certainly haven't been doing justice to Nottingham Forest the way I felt. And consequently after a great deal of thought, there was no option. I wanted to take an early retirement. That's exactly what I've done."

Jimmy Gordon retired in the same close season.

After clinching a decent fifth place in the 1982–83 season, the next campaign 1983–84 the club -returning to the continental competitions after two years- was defeated by Anderlecht in the UEFA Cup semi finals in controversial circumstances. Several contentious refereeing decisions went against Forest. Over a decade later it emerged that before the match the referee Guruceta Muro received a £27,000 "loan" from Anderlecht's chairman Constant Vanden Stock. In 1997 UEFA subsequently banned Anderlecht for one year from European competition. Muro died in a car crash in 1987.

After three seasons (1984–85, 1985–86 and 1986–87) without trophies, Forest defeated Sheffield Wednesday on penalties in the Football League Centenary Tournament final in April 1988 after drawing 0–0. Forest finished third in the league in the 1987–88 season and reached the FA Cup semi-finals. Stuart Pearce won the first of his five successive selections for the PFA Team of the Year.

On 18 January 1989, Clough joined the fray of a City Ground pitch invasion by hitting two of his own team's fans when on the pitch. The football authorities fined Clough and issued him with a touchline ban. Forest defeated QPR 5–2 in that 1988–89 Football League Cup tie.

Forest defeated Everton 4–3 after extra time in the 1989 Full Members' Cup final. They came back to defeat Luton Town 3–1 in the League Cup final. Nigel Clough scored two and Neil Webb one. Forest chased a unique cup treble in the 1988–89 season, but tragedy struck a week after the League Cup win. Forest and Liverpool met for the second season in a row in the FA Cup semi-finals. The Hillsborough disaster claimed the lives of 97 Liverpool fans, and the match was abandoned after six minutes. When the rescheduled game took place, Forest struggled and Liverpool won 3–1. Forest finished third in the First Division for a second successive year. However, they were unable to compete in the UEFA Cup as English clubs were still banned from European competitions following the Heysel Stadium Disaster. Des Walker won the first of his four successive selections for the PFA Team of the Year.

Nigel Jemson scored as Forest defeated Oldham Athletic 1–0 to retain the League Cup in 1990. Clough reached his only FA Cup final in 1991. Pearce put Forest ahead after sixteen minutes, direct from a free kick against Tottenham Hotspur at Wembley. Spurs won 2–1 after an extra-time own goal by Walker. Roy Keane declared himself fit to play in the final and was selected in preference to Steve Hodge. Keane later admitted he was not fit to play and that was why he had such an insignificant role in the final. English clubs were re-admitted to Europe for the 1990–91 season. English places in the competition were initially limited. 1990 League Cup winners Forest were not included. The only UEFA Cup place that season went to league runners-up Aston Villa.

In the summer of 1991, Millwall's league top scorer Teddy Sheringham set Forest's record signing fee at £2.1 million. In that 1991–92 season Forest defeated Southampton 3–2 after extra time in the Full Members' Cup final. Brian McClair's solitary Manchester United goal defeated Forest in the 1992 Football League Cup final. Forest had played in seven domestic cup finals at Wembley in five seasons, winning five. Forest finished eighth in the league that season to earn a place in the new FA Premier League.

Walker transferred in the summer 1992 to Italian side Sampdoria. On 16 August 1992, Forest defeated Liverpool 1–0 at home in the first ever televised live Premier League game. Sheringham scored the only goal against Liverpool. Only one week later, Sheringham transferred to Tottenham. Forest's form slumped, meaning Clough's 18-year managerial reign ended in May 1993 with Forest relegated from the inaugural Premier League. In the final game of the season away to Ipswich, Forest lost 2–1, with Clough's son, Nigel, scoring the last goal of the Brian Clough era at Nottingham Forest. Relegation was followed by Keane's £3.75 million then-British record fee transfer to Manchester United.

=== Links with other jobs ===
Clough was a popular choice to be appointed England manager throughout the 1970s and 1980s. However, it was widely felt that the FA were unwilling to consider appointing him on account of his numerous outspoken comments about the English football authorities. He was interviewed for the job twice, in 1977 and 1982, but lost out to Ron Greenwood and Bobby Robson respectively. Such was the demand for Clough to be given the job that incumbent manager Robson told then-FA chairman Sir Bert Millichip: 'I'm having a rough time and everybody wants Brian – give the job to him. If he's successful, everybody's happy. If he fails, that's the end of the clamour for Brian Clough to be England manager'."

Clough was still a popular choice to be given the job of England manager before Graham Taylor's appointment in 1990. Clough himself quipped: "I'm sure the England selectors thought, if they took me on and gave me the job, I'd want to run the show. They were shrewd because that's exactly what I would have done." He has been called the "greatest manager England never had." In 1977, Clough was reportedly interested in the Everton manager's job, but Gordon Lee was appointed instead.

Following Mike England's dismissal as manager of Wales in February 1988, Clough was offered the position as manager of Wales on a part-time basis, something later done with John Toshack. Clough was keen on the chance to become an international manager, but the directors of Nottingham Forest refused to let him split his loyalties. According to Hamish Woodward writing in Atletifo Sports, Clough used the Wales job to earn himself an improved contract with Nottingham Forest. In April 1986, Clough had declared that he intended to spend the rest of his managerial career with Nottingham Forest. In June 1986, Clough was linked with the job of Scotland manager, but the vacancy was filled by Andy Roxburgh (a long-serving member of the Scotland coaching set-up) instead. Clough had also been linked with the Republic of Ireland job the previous year, before it was filled by fellow Englishman Jack Charlton.

=== Rift with Peter Taylor ===
Peter Taylor, Clough's friend and long-time assistant at Hartlepools, Derby, Brighton and Forest, retired from football in 1982, bringing to an end their partnership. Several events had strained their friendship in the past: while at Derby, Taylor was riled when he learned that Clough had accepted a pay rise from Sam Longson without telling him; Taylor did not get one. Then, in 1980, Taylor released a book, With Clough, By Taylor, which detailed their partnership, but he had not told Clough that he was writing the book. Six months after retiring, Taylor was appointed Derby County manager. When their teams met in the FA Cup third round on 8 January 1983 at the Baseball Ground, the two managers ignored each other and did not speak. Derby won the match 2–0, a result which Forest players said was the angriest they had seen Clough react to, which was compounded when Forest's Willie Young shook hands with Taylor after the game before getting on the coach, with Clough then running to the back of the coach where Young was sitting to ask him: "Did you shake hands with that shithouse Taylor?"

When Taylor signed John Robertson from Forest without informing Clough on 21 May 1983, it was, according to Robertson, "the straw that broke the camel's back" and the two men would never speak again. In a tabloid article, Clough called Taylor a "snake in the grass" and declared that "if his car broke down and I saw him thumbing a lift, I wouldn't pick him up, I'd run him over." Taylor retorted that Clough's outbursts were "the sort of thing I have come to expect from a person I now regard with great distaste."

The rift had not been repaired by the time Taylor died in October 1990, but Clough and his family attended Taylor's funeral. According to Taylor's daughter Wendy, Clough was "deeply upset" by Taylor's death and telephoned her when he heard the news. Clough dedicated his autobiography in 1994 to Taylor, and he also paid tribute to him when he was given the freedom of Nottingham, as he did in September 1999 when a bust was unveiled of Clough at the City Ground.

=== Corruption allegations ===
Clough was implicated in the 1990s "bungs" scandal in English football. A "bung" was a euphemism for illicit payments made between parties to ensure player transfer deals went through. In 1995 George Graham, then Arsenal manager, lost his job over payments during the transfer of two Scandinavian players in 1992.

Clough became involved in the scandal in June 1993 when he was named in court by Alan Sugar, then chairman of Tottenham Hotspur. Sugar, who was the club's major shareholder, was taking legal action to sack Terry Venables, the club's chief executive. Sugar testified in court that during the 1992 transfer of Teddy Sheringham from Nottingham Forest to Tottenham, Venables had told him that Clough "liked a bung". Sugar said he sanctioned a cash payment of £58,750, which he believed would be paid to an agent, but instead was handed over to Ronnie Fenton, Clough's assistant at Forest.

After an inquiry by the FA, Clough was charged with misconduct but the case was dropped due to his ill health. Former Premier League chief executive Rick Parry, who led the investigation into Clough, said: "On the balance of evidence, we felt he was guilty of taking bungs. The evidence was pretty strong." A former Forest chief scout Alan Hill confirmed Clough had made illegal payments to players and backroom staff in breach of FA rules. Clough always denied the allegations, saying "Asking me what it's like to make money out of transfers is like asking 'What's it like to have VD?' I don't know, I've never had it."

== Later life ==
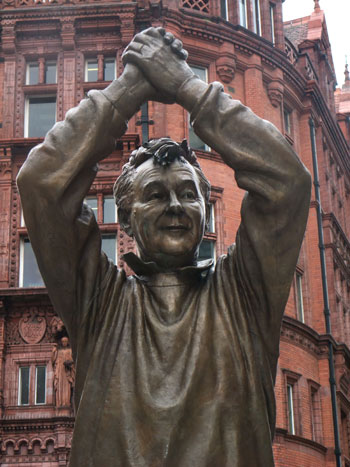
A statue of Clough in Nottingham. The statue was funded by fans of Nottingham Forest and unveiled in 2008.

Much of Clough's retirement was spent concentrating on his fight against alcoholism, ill-health and corruption allegations. His battle with alcoholism dated back to the 1970s and was chronicled in part by Duncan Hamilton in his award-winning book Provided You Don't Kiss Me: 20 Years With Brian Clough. He considered applying for the job as manager of Wolverhampton Wanderers on the sacking of Graham Taylor on 13 November 1995. Nothing came of it, however, and Clough's managerial career was over.

In November 1994, Clough caused controversy over comments he made about the Hillsborough disaster. He wrote in his autobiography: "I will always remain convinced that those Liverpool fans who died were killed by Liverpool people. They brought the tragedy on themselves—they were drunk, unruly and disorderly." He defended the comments in an interview with Clive Anderson. In 2001, he said: "I now accept the investigations have made me realise I was misinformed. I wasn't trying to be vindictive or unsympathetic, but my opinion has altered over the years. It was never my intention to hurt anyone."

Nottingham Forest honoured him by renaming the City Ground's largest stand, the Executive Stand, the Brian Clough Stand. Clough was made an inaugural inductee of the English Football Hall of Fame in 2002 in recognition of his success and influence as a manager. In 1993, he was awarded the freedom of the city of Nottingham. In 2003, the city of Derby followed suit. He wrote a column for FourFourTwo magazine up until his death.

== Personal life and family ==
Clough was a lifelong socialist, often appearing on miners' picket lines, donating large sums to trade union causes, canvassing for his local MP, and being the chairman of the Anti-Nazi League. On two occasions, he was approached by the Labour Party to stand as a parliamentary candidate in general elections, but he declined in order to continue his managerial career in football. To accusations that he was a champagne socialist, Clough responded: "Of course I'm a champagne socialist. The difference between me and a good Tory is he keeps his money while I share mine."

On 4 April 1959, Clough married Barbara Glasgow in Middlesbrough; he later said that marrying Barbara was "the best thing I ever did". They went on to have three children: Simon, born on 15 June 1964, Nigel, born on 19 March 1966, and Elizabeth, born on 31 May 1967. During the 1980s the Clough family went on to mentor a couple of underprivileged youngsters from Sunderland, brothers Craig and Aaron Bromfield after a chance encounter in the North East prior to a Forest fixture. Craig at one point ended up living with the Cloughs for a significant period of time, coming to see Brian as a second father—the arrangement ending when Craig was found to have been stealing from the family. Craig later published a book on his experience. Nigel also became a professional footballer and played under his father at Forest in the 1980s and 1990s. He then moved into management and, in January 2009, followed in his father's footsteps when he was appointed manager of Derby County.

In 2011, his family and friends contributed memories to a book entitled The Day I Met Brian Clough, which also included recollections from fans and journalists. His widow, Barbara, died on 20 July 2013 at the age of 75. Her death was revealed to have been the result of a head injury sustained when she fell over in a car park of a hospital where she was being treated for cancer.

A lover of cricket, Clough was good friends with Yorkshire and England cricketer Geoffrey Boycott.

Clough was appointed an Officer of the Order of the British Empire (OBE) in the 1991 Birthday Honours for services to association football.

== Death ==
Clough died of stomach cancer on 20 September 2004, on Ward 30, in Derby City Hospital, at the age of 69, having been admitted a few days earlier. Such was his popularity, fans of Derby County and Nottingham Forest, usually fierce rivals, mourned together following his death. A memorial service was held at Derby's Pride Park Stadium on 21 October 2004 which was attended by more than 14,000 people. It was originally to have been held at Derby Cathedral, but had to be moved because of demand for tickets.

== Legacy ==
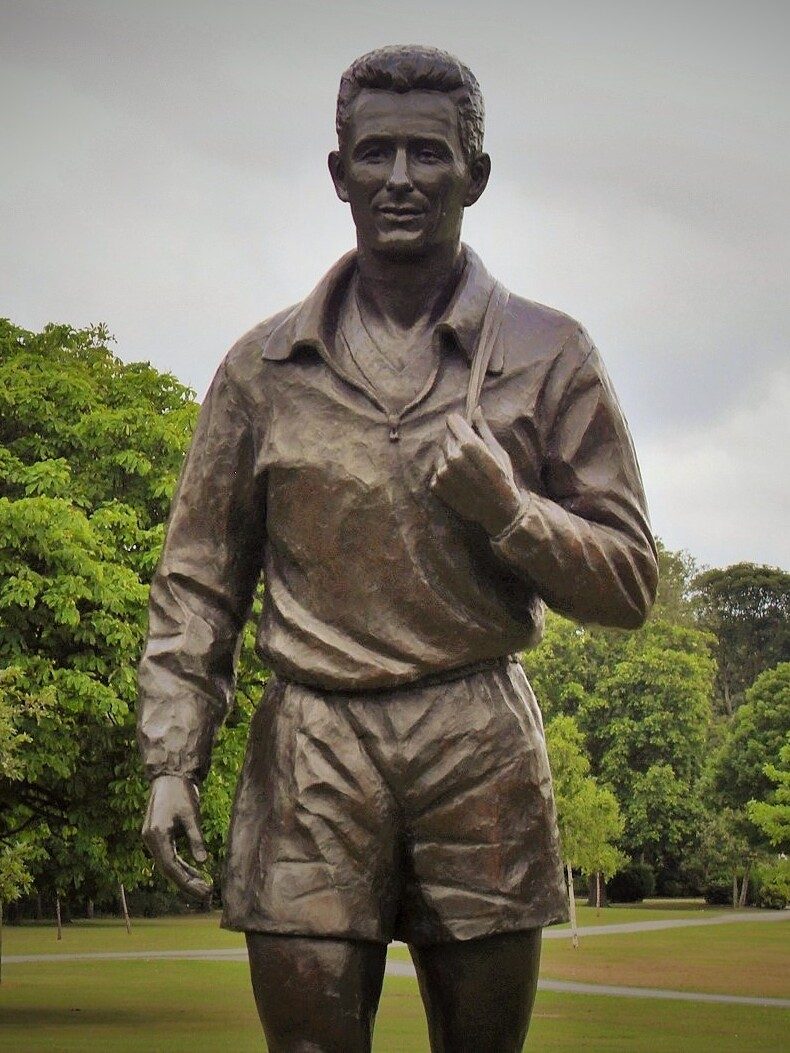
Statue of Brian Clough, Middlesbrough

In August 2005, the stretch of the A52 linking Nottingham and Derby was renamed Brian Clough Way. His widow Barbara expressed her gratitude to Nottingham City Council, saying: "Brian would have been amazed but genuinely appreciative". Since the opening of the Nottingham Express Transit system, tram No. 215 has been named Brian Clough.

After a long process of fundraising, Clough's home town of Middlesbrough commissioned a statue of him, which was unveiled on 16 May 2007. Although there was a movement to erect a statue in his birthplace at Grove Hill, the site chosen was the town's Albert Park, through which he usually walked on his way from home to Ayresome Park, Middlesbrough's former stadium.

In August 2008, a tribute website was set up in honour of Clough with the backing of his family. This helped to raise money for a statue of Clough, which was erected in Nottingham's Old Market Square on 6 November 2008. In December 2006, the Brian Clough Statue Fund in Nottingham announced it had raised £69,000 in just 18 months for a statue of Clough in the city. The winning statue was selected from a choice of three designs in January 2008. The site chosen for the statue was at the junction of King Street and Queen Street in the centre of Nottingham. On 6 November 2008, the statue was unveiled by Clough's widow Barbara, in front of a crowd of more than 5,000 people. The tribute website brianclough.com is still attracting visitors from around the world and was praised by Barbara Clough on its tenth anniversary in 2010. Barbara Clough said she hoped it would "continue to be a success for many years". In 2007 and 2008, a redevelopment scheme building new houses on the old Middlesbrough General Hospital site named roads after famous former Middlesbrough F.C. players, including Willie Maddren, George Camsell and Clough.

Derby County and Nottingham Forest competed for the inaugural Brian Clough Trophy at Pride Park on 31 July 2007. In future, any league, cup or friendly game played between Derby and Forest will automatically become a Brian Clough Trophy game. Proceeds from the games will go to charities in the East Midlands.

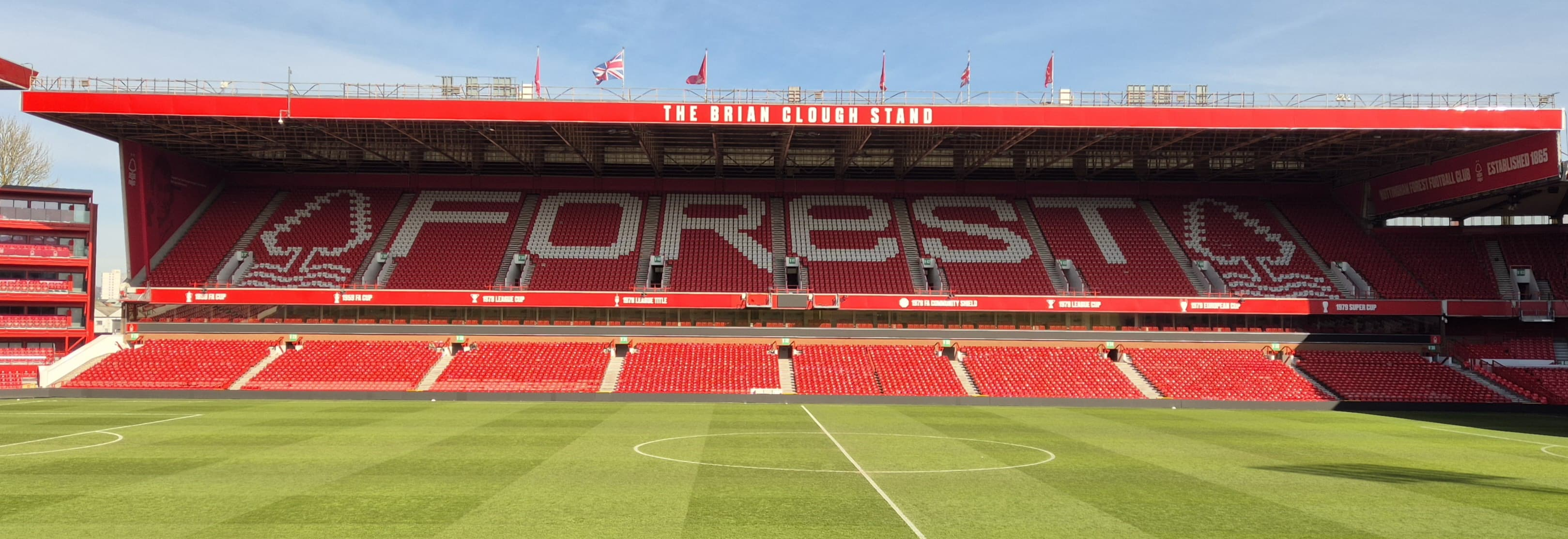
The Brian Clough Stand, City Ground. Named after Brian Clough.

In April 2009, Derby County announced that they would erect a statue of Clough and Peter Taylor at Pride Park, with sculptor Andy Edwards, who previously produced the Steve Bloomer bust already in the stadium, commissioned for the statue. The Brian Clough and Peter Taylor Monument was officially unveiled in a family service on 27 August 2010 and publicly on 28 August 2010.

== The Damned United ==
The story of Clough's turbulent 44-day spell in charge of Leeds United was the subject of a novel by David Peace titled The Damned Utd, published in 2006, which focuses on the rivalry between Clough and Don Revie. Despite critical acclaim, the novel was also the subject of controversy for its perceived negative portrayal of Clough as an obsessive, and for some historical inaccuracies. The publishers of the novel were successfully sued by Irish midfielder and former Leeds player Johnny Giles. He wrote: "Many of the things Peace talks about in the book never happened and, for that reason, I felt it necessary to go to the courts to establish that this was fiction based on fact and nothing more". The Clough family expressed disappointment at the publication of the book. It includes a scene with Clough in the Elland Road car park burning Revie's old desk, for which there is no factual source.

The book was later adapted into a film called The Damned United, starring Michael Sheen and released in 2009. It too was successfully sued for defamation, this time by Dave Mackay, who in 2010 received an apology and an undisclosed sum from the producers. The Clough family declined to co-operate with the film, despite efforts by the film-makers to lighten the dark tone of the novel.

== Bloody Southerners ==
In 2018, a book chronicling Clough and Taylor's hitherto unwritten time in management at Brighton & Hove Albion, Bloody Southerners: Clough and Taylor's Brighton & Hove Albion Odyssey, was written by Spencer Vignes and published by Biteback Publishing. Clough and Taylor had joined Brighton in November 1973, and Vignes speaks to the Brighton players who played under them. Clough himself only stayed for a few months, before heading to Leeds United at the end of the season. Taylor, meanwhile, chose to honour his contract with club chairman Mike Bamber, and stayed on as sole manager until the end of the 1975/76 season.

== Career statistics ==
=== As a player ===
Appearances and goals by club, season and competition
| Club | Season | League | | | FA Cup | | League Cup | | Total | |
| Club | Season | Division | Apps | Goals | Apps | Goals | Apps | Goals | Apps | Goals |
|---|---|---|---|---|---|---|---|---|---|---|
| Middlesbrough | 1955–56 | Second Division | 9 | 3 | 0 | 0 | — | | 9 | 3 |
| Middlesbrough | 1956–57 | Second Division | 41 | 38 | 3 | 2 | — | | 44 | 40 |
| Middlesbrough | 1957–58 | Second Division | 40 | 40 | 2 | 2 | — | | 42 | 42 |
| Middlesbrough | 1958–59 | Second Division | 42 | 43 | 1 | 0 | — | | 43 | 43 |
| Middlesbrough | 1959–60 | Second Division | 41 | 39 | 1 | 1 | — | | 42 | 40 |
| Middlesbrough | 1960–61 | Second Division | 40 | 34 | 1 | 0 | 1 | 2 | 42 | 36 |
| Middlesbrough | Total | | 213 | 197 | 8 | 5 | 1 | 2 | 222 | 204 |
| Sunderland | 1961–62 | Second Division | 34 | 29 | 4 | 0 | 5 | 5 | 43 | 34 |
| Sunderland | 1962–63 | Second Division | 24 | 24 | 0 | 0 | 4 | 4 | 28 | 28 |
| Sunderland | 1963–64 | Second Division | 0 | 0 | 0 | 0 | 0 | 0 | 0 | 0 |
| Sunderland | 1964–65 | First Division | 3 | 1 | 0 | 0 | 0 | 0 | 3 | 1 |
| Sunderland | Total | | 61 | 54 | 4 | 0 | 9 | 9 | 74 | 63 |
| Career total | | | 274 | 251 | 12 | 5 | 10 | 11 | 296 | 267 |

=== As a manager ===
Managerial record by team and tenure
| Team | From | To | Record | | | | |
| Team | From | To | P | W | D | L | Win % |
|---|---|---|---|---|---|---|---|
| Hartlepools United | 29 October 1965 | 5 June 1967 | 85 | 37 | 14 | 34 | 43.53 |
| Derby County | 5 June 1967 | 15 October 1973 | 332 | 161 | 78 | 93 | 48.49 |
| Brighton & Hove Albion | 1 November 1973 | 20 July 1974 | 34 | 12 | 9 | 13 | 35.29 |
| Leeds United | 30 July 1974 | 12 September 1974 | 8 | 1 | 4 | 3 | 12.50 |
| Nottingham Forest | 3 January 1975 | 8 May 1993 | 994 | 464 | 263 | 267 | 46.68 |
| Total | | | 1,453 | 675 | 368 | 410 | 46.46 |

== Honours ==
=== Player ===
Middlesbrough

- North Riding Senior Cup: 1954–55

England

- British Home Championship: 1959–60

Individual

- Football League Second Division top goalscorer: 1958–59, 1959–60
- Northern Echo Middlesbrough's Greatest XI (1876–2017)

=== Manager ===
Derby County

- Football League First Division: 1971–72
- Football League Second Division: 1968–69
- Texaco Cup: 1971–72
- Watney Cup: 1970

Nottingham Forest

- Football League First Division: 1977–78
- Football League Second Division third-place promotion: 1976–77
- Football League Cup: 1977–78, 1978–79, 1988–89, 1989–90; runner-up: 1979–80, 1991–92
- Full Members' Cup: 1988–89, 1991–92
- FA Charity Shield: 1978
- European Cup: 1978–79, 1979–80
- European Super Cup: 1979
- Anglo-Scottish Cup: 1976–77
- Football League Centenary Tournament: 1988
- FA Cup runner-up: 1990–91

Individual

- Manager of the Year: 1977–78
- Officer of the Order of the British Empire: 1991
- LMA Hall of Fame inductee: 1989
- PFA Merit Award: 1992
- English Football Hall of Fame inductee: 2002
- Freedom of the City of Derby 3 May 2003.
- ESPN 3rd Greatest Manager of All-Time: 2013
- France Football 15th Greatest Manager of All-Time: 2019
- World Soccer 17th Greatest Manager of All-Time: 2013
- Made in Derby Walk of Fame: 2018
- NFFCNA Hall Of Fame inductee: 2019

== See also ==
- List of English football championship winning managers
- List of longest managerial reigns in association football
- List of football managers with the most matches
