= Don Walker (footballer, born 1935) =

Scottish footballer

Personal information
- Full name: Donald Hunter Walker
- Date of birth: 10 September 1935
- Place of birth: Edinburgh, Scotland
- Date of death: 21 December 2011 (aged 76)
- Place of death: Isle of Man
- Height: 5 ft 10 in (1.78 m)
- Position: Wing half

Senior career*
Years	Team	Apps	(Gls)
1953–1955	Broughton Star		
1955	Tranent Juniors		
1955–1959	Leicester City	32	(1)
1959–1963	Middlesbrough	23	(1)
1963–1964	Grimsby Town	15	(1)
1964	Ashford Town (Kent)		
1964–196?	Rugby Town		
- * Club domestic league appearances and goals

Donald Hunter Walker (10 September 1935 – 21 December 2011) was a Scottish professional footballer, who played as a wing half.
