= Denis Foreman =

South African cricketer and footballer

Personal information
- Full name: Denis Joseph Foreman
- Born: 1 February 1933; Cape Town, South Africa
- Died: 23 July 2016 (aged 83); Portslade, England
- Batting: Right-handed
- Bowling: Right-arm off-spin

Domestic team information
- Years: Team
- 1951–1952: Western Province
- 1952–1966: Sussex

Career statistics
| Competition | First-class |
|---|---|
| Matches | 130 |
| Runs scored | 3277 |
| Batting average | 18.20 |
| 100s/50s | 1/15 |
| Top score | 104 |
| Balls bowled | 638 |
| Wickets | 9 |
| Bowling average | 30.33 |
| 5 wickets in innings | 0 |
| 10 wickets in match | 0 |
| Best bowling | 4/64 |
| Catches/stumpings | 124/0 |
- Source: CricketArchive, 26 January 2016
Association football career
- Position: Inside forward
Senior career*
| Years | Team | Apps | (Gls) |
| –1952 | Hibernian (South Africa) | | |
| 1952–1961 | Brighton & Hove Albion | 211 | (63) |
| 1961–19?? | Hastings United | | |
| Total | | 211 | (63) |
- * Club domestic league appearances and goals

Denis Joseph Foreman (1 February 1933 – 23 July 2016) was a South African cricketer and footballer.

Foreman played cricket for Sussex from 1952 to 1967. He appeared in 130 first-class matches as a right-handed batsman who bowled occasional off-breaks. He scored 3,277 runs with a highest score of 104 against Nottinghamshire in 1967.

He also played 212 matches for Brighton and Hove Albion between 1953 and 1962, scoring 63 goals as an inside forward.

== Personal life ==
His grandson Bertie Foreman is also a Sussex cricketer.
