= Dennis Windross =

English footballer

Personal information
- Full name: Dennis Windross
- Date of birth: 12 May 1938
- Place of birth: Guisborough, England
- Date of death: 9 October 1989 (aged 51)
- Height: 5 ft 10 in (1.78 m)
- Positions: Forward; wing half

Youth career
- –: Blackett Hutton
- –: Middlesbrough

Senior career*
| Years | Team | Apps | (Gls) |
| 1956–1960 | Middlesbrough | 4 | (1) |
| 1960–1961 | Brighton & Hove Albion | 18 | (2) |
| 1961–1962 | Darlington | 25 | (4) |
| 1962–1964 | Doncaster Rovers | 51 | (4) |
| Total | | 98 | (11) |
- * Club domestic league appearances and goals

Dennis Windross (12 May 1938 – 9 October 1989) was an English footballer who scored 11 goals from 98 appearances in the Football League playing as a forward or wing half for Middlesbrough, Brighton & Hove Albion, Darlington and Doncaster Rovers. He was a scorer in Doncaster's record League win, by ten goals to nil against his former club Darlington on 25 January 1964.
