= Bob Appleby (footballer) =

English footballer (1940–2024)

Personal information
- Full name: Robert Appleby
- Date of birth: 15 January 1940
- Place of birth: Warkworth, England
- Date of death: 25 April 2024 (aged 84)
- Position: Goalkeeper

Youth career
- Amble Welfare
- 1957–1960: Middlesbrough

Senior career*
Years	Team	Apps	(Gls)
1960–1967	Middlesbrough	99	(0)
- Hereford United
- Carlisle United
Total		99+	(0+)
- * Club domestic league appearances and goals

Robert Appleby (15 January 1940 – 25 April 2024) was an English professional footballer who played as a goalkeeper.

== Career ==
Born in Warkworth, Appleby moved from Amble Welfare to Middlesbrough aged 17, initially playing with their Reserves before making his first-team debut in April 1960. He was a first-team regular for two seasons, and made nearly 100 appearances before moving to Hereford United in 1967. He also played for Carlisle United.

Appleby was known for making bird noises during games, and for having a shotgun in his van, which he once used to shoot pigeons over the training pitch.
