= Ronnie Waldock =

English footballer

Ronald Waldock (born 6 December 1932) is an English former professional footballer. Born in Heanor in Derbyshire, he played for Coventry City, Sheffield United, Scunthorpe United, Plymouth Argyle, Middlesbrough and Gillingham between 1950 and 1964.
