= Carl Taylor (footballer) =

English footballer

Personal information
- Full name: Carl Wilson Taylor
- Date of birth: 20 January 1937 (age 89)
- Place of birth: Kirkby Stephen, England
- Position: Outside right

Senior career*
Years	Team	Apps	(Gls)
- Kirkby Stephen
1953–1954	Wolverhampton Wanderers	0	(0)
1954–1955	Penrith		
1957–1960	Middlesbrough	11	(1)
1960–1962	Aldershot	78	(13)
1962–1963	Darlington	18	(1)
- * Club domestic league appearances and goals

Carl Wilson Taylor (born 20 January 1937) is an English former footballer who played as an outside right in the Football League for Middlesbrough, Aldershot and Darlington. He also played non-league football for Penrith and Burton Albion.

== Life and career ==
Taylor was born in Kirkby Stephen, which was then in Westmorland, in 1937. He represented the county at youth level, and played in the Westmorland League for his hometown club, from where, just after his 16th birthday, he was invited to join First Division club Wolverhampton Wanderers. By 1954, he was back home and playing for Northern League club Penrith.

Taylor turned professional with Second Division Middlesbrough in January 1956. He made his first-team debut in November 1957, deputising for Lindy Delapenha away to Notts County, and scored on his second appearance five months later, in a 3–2 defeat at Sheffield United, but played only infrequently thereafter, Billy Day being preferred when his National Service commitments allowed.

Having played just once for Middlesbrough's first team in the 1959–60 season, Taylor moved on to Fourth Division club Aldershot. According to a profile on an Aldershot F.C. historical website, he was "a talented player who was able to shoot with both feet and was the provider of accurate crosses from dead ball [and] tight marking situations." He was a regular for Aldershot for just over two seasons, with 13 goals from 78 league appearances. He submitted a transfer request, and in September 1962 signed for fellow fourth-tier club Darlington, for whom he scored once in 18 league matches.

On the recommendation of Brian Clough, Southern League club Burton Albion signed Taylor from Darlington – he had played alongside both Clough and Burton's manager, Peter Taylor, at Middlesbrough – but it was not a successful move. After leaving football, Taylor ran a building firm in his native Kirkby Stephen.
