= Ray Yeoman =

Scottish footballer and manager

Personal information
- Full name: Ramon Irvine Yeoman
- Date of birth: 13 May 1934
- Place of birth: Perth, Scotland
- Date of death: 15 March 2004 (aged 69)
- Place of death: Middlesbrough, England
- Position: Wing half

Senior career*
Years	Team	Apps	(Gls)
1953–1958	Northampton Town	169	(4)
1958–1964	Middlesbrough	210	(3)
1964–1968	Darlington	104	(2)

Managerial career
- 1968–1970: Darlington
- * Club domestic league appearances and goals

Ramon Irvine Yeoman (13 May 1934 – 15 March 2004), nicknamed Yogi, was a Scottish football player and manager. He made nearly 500 appearances in the Football League playing as a wing half for Northampton Town, Middlesbrough and Darlington, and managed the latter club from 1968 to 1970.

== Career ==
Yeoman began his career with Northampton Town. He also spent five years at Middlesbrough, holding the most number of consecutive appearances (210), until this was surpassed by Gordon Jones.

He went on to manage Darlington, where he had an excellent understanding and a special relationship with his former team-mate Alan Sproates. Yeoman was sacked by Darlington after they just missed out on promotion. He joined Sunderland as youth team coach and was part of the FA Cup win against Leeds United in the 1973 FA Cup Final.

He later became a scout for Everton and Ipswich Town.

== Death ==
Yeoman was born in Perth but lived in Teesside until his death in 2004. Both he and his wife are buried there.

== Honours ==
=== As a coach ===
Sunderland

- FA Cup winner: 1973

== Managerial statistics ==
Team	From	To	Record				
Team	From	To	G	W	L	D	Win %
Darlington	March 1968	May 1970	108	36	38	34	33.3
