= Bob Dennison (footballer, born 1912) =

English footballer and manager

Personal information
- Full name: Robert Smith Dennison
- Date of birth: 6 March 1912
- Place of birth: Amble, England
- Date of death: 19 June 1996 (aged 84)
- Place of death: Margate Kent, England
- Position: Centre half

Senior career*
Years	Team	Apps	(Gls)
19??–1929	Radcliffe Welfare United		
1929–1934	Newcastle United	11	(2)
1934–1935	Nottingham Forest	15	(5)
1935–1945	Fulham	31	(0)
1945–1947	Northampton Town	55	(0)

Managerial career
- 1949–1954: Northampton Town
- 1954–1963: Middlesbrough
- 1963–1967: Hereford United
- 1972: Coventry City (caretaker manager)
- * Club domestic league appearances and goals

Robert Smith Dennison (6 March 1912 – 19 June 1996) was an English professional footballer who made 112 appearances in the Football League playing for Newcastle United, Nottingham Forest, Fulham and Northampton Town. He then went into management, with Northampton Town, Middlesbrough, Hereford United and Coventry City, where he was chief scout and spent three months as caretaker manager after Noel Cantwell's dismissal in 1972.
