= Brian Phillips (footballer) =

English footballer and manager

Personal information
- Date of birth: 9 November 1931
- Place of birth: Cadishead, England
- Date of death: 28 March 2012 (aged 80)
- Place of death: Mansfield, England
- Position: Centre half

Youth career
- Lancashire Steel

Senior career*
Years	Team	Apps	(Gls)
1950–1954	Altrincham		
1954–1960	Middlesbrough	121	(2)
1960–1963	Mansfield Town	103	(3)
Total		224	(5)

Managerial career
- 1975–1978: Notts FA
- Clipstone Welfare
- Retford Town
- Rainworth Miners Welfare
- Rainworth Miners Welfare
- * Club domestic league appearances and goals

Brian Phillips (9 November 1931 – 28 March 2012) was an English professional footballer who played as a centre half.

== Career ==
Born in Cadishead, Phillips played for Lancashire Steel, Altrincham, Middlesbrough and Mansfield Town, before being banned for his involvement in the 1964 British betting scandal.

After being re-instated in 1971, Phillips began a managerial career. He took charge of the Notts FA representative side from 1975 to 1978, and managed a number of non-league clubs including Clipstone Welfare and Retford Town. He also had two spells as manager of Rainworth Miners Welfare, leading them to the 1982 FA Vase Final.

== Later life and death ==
Phillips died on 28 March 2012, at the age of 80, following a longstanding illness.
