= Bill Harris (Welsh footballer) =

Welsh footballer and manager

Personal information
- Full name: William Charles Harris
- Date of birth: 31 October 1928
- Place of birth: Swansea, Wales
- Date of death: 30 November 1989 (aged 61)
- Place of death: Middlesbrough, England
- Position: Wing half

Senior career*
Years	Team	Apps	(Gls)
	Swansea City	0	(0)
1949–1950	Llanelli		
1950–1954	Hull City	131	(6)
1954–1965	Middlesbrough	360	(69)
1965–1966	Bradford City	9	(1)

International career
- Wales

Managerial career
- 1965–1966: Bradford City
- 1967–1969: Stockton
- * Club domestic league appearances and goals

William Charles Harris (31 October 1928 – 30 November 1989) was a Welsh footballer, who played for his national side and Middlesbrough and later became a manager.

== Career ==
Bill Harris started his footballing career with local club Swansea City but failed to graduate beyond the third team and so moved to Llanelli in 1949. After just six months at the club he signed for Hull City for £2,000. He played 131 games for Hull before a move to Middlesbrough in March 1954 for £15,000. Harris, a wing half, played 378 games, scoring 72 goals for Middlesbrough and was capped for Wales. He won his first Welsh cap against Austria in May 1954 in Vienna but had to wait three years for his second cap. Harris had the distinction of scoring a goal in just 11 seconds in a 5-1 FA cup win against Shrewsbury Town in 1962.

In March 1965, he joined Bradford City as their third player-manager following the departure of Bob Brocklebank. He took charge at a struggling club, during its darkest days, and in his first season, the club had finished 19th in Division Four. The following season the club's problems continued and Harris resigned a year after he took over with the club heading towards re-election.

His stay also signalled the end of his playing career, when he was injured during a 7–1 defeat to Crewe Alexandra and was advised to stop playing.

In November 1967, he returned to Teesside as manager-coach of non-league Stockton, before he retired in May 1969. He later worked for an insurance firm in Middlesbrough. He died in Middlesbrough in 1989 after suffering several strokes.
