= Alan Peacock =

English footballer (1937–2025)

Personal information
- Date of birth: 29 October 1937
- Place of birth: Middlesbrough, North Riding of Yorkshire, England
- Date of death: 29 June 2025 (aged 87)
- Place of death: Middlesbrough, North Riding of Yorkshire, England
- Position: Forward

Senior career*
Years	Team	Apps	(Gls)
1954–1964	Middlesbrough	218	(125)
1964–1967	Leeds United	54	(27)
1967–1968	Plymouth Argyle	11	(1)
Total		283	(153)

International career
1962–1965	England	6	(3)
- * Club domestic league appearances and goals

Alan Peacock (29 October 1937 – 29 June 2025) was an English footballer who played as a forward.

== Club career ==
Peacock spent the majority of his career at Middlesbrough, also playing for Leeds United and Plymouth Argyle. He joined Middlesbrough in 1954 and became a regular in the side in 1958 alongside Brian Clough. Clough scored the majority of the goals, partly due to Peacock's unselfish attitude in front of goal. Clough joined Sunderland in 1961 and the following season Peacock scored 24 in 34 games.

In 1964, he moved to Leeds United for £55,000 to help Don Revie's team with promotion, which was achieved that season with Peacock scoring 8 goals in 14 games. He stayed at Leeds for a further three seasons scoring 30 goals in 65 games, yet more frequent injuries forced his sale to Plymouth Argyle for £10,000 in 1967 where he played only one season before being forced to retire due to injuries in 1968.

== International career ==
Peacock's high scoring rate earned him a place in the 1962 World Cup England squad. He made his international debut in the Group Four victory over Argentina. Since then only Allan Clarke in 1970 has made his debut in a World Cup finals match. In total, he earned 6 caps and scored 3 goals for England, two of which came in a 4–0 victory over Wales in November 1962.

== Personal life, illness and death ==
Peacock returned to his hometown after retirement. Peacock wore the number 9 shirt and sold his newsagents shop in Ormesby, Middlesbrough, having owned it for forty years.

Peacock was diagnosed with dementia in 2018. He died in Middlesbrough, North Riding of Yorkshire, England on 29 June 2025, aged 87.

== Honours ==
Leeds United

- FA Cup runner-up: 1964–65
