= Colin Grainger =

English footballer (1933–2022)

Personal information
- Full name: Colin Grainger
- Date of birth: 10 June 1933
- Place of birth: Havercroft, West Yorkshire, England
- Date of death: 19 June 2022 (aged 89)
- Place of death: Skelmanthorpe, Yorkshire, England
- Height: 5 ft 10 in (1.78 m)
- Position: Outside left

Youth career
- 194?–1949: South Elmsall
- 1949–1950: Wrexham

Senior career*
Years	Team	Apps	(Gls)
1950–1953	Wrexham	5	(0)
1953–1957	Sheffield United	88	(26)
1957–1960	Sunderland	120	(14)
1960–1961	Leeds United	41	(6)
1961–1964	Port Vale	39	(6)
1964–1966	Doncaster Rovers	40	(3)
1966	Macclesfield Town	3	(0)
1969–1972	Newmillerdam		
1972–1978	Woolley Miners Welfare		
Total		336	(55)

International career
1956	The Football League XI	2	(1)
1956–1957	England	7	(3)

Managerial career
- 1969–1972: Newmillerdam (player-manager)
- * Club domestic league appearances and goals

Colin Grainger (10 June 1933 – 19 June 2022) was an English footballer, as well as being a former singer and recording artist. As a footballer, he played as an outside left and had a 16-year career in the Football League from 1950 to 1966. He came from a footballing family: brother Jack Grainger, brother-in-law Jim Iley, and first cousins Dennis Grainger, Jack Grainger and Edwin Holliday all played professionally. He got married in 1956 and had two children.

Raised in the mining village of Havercroft, he was working as a car mechanic when he was signed on apprentice forms at Third Division North club Wrexham in July 1949. He turned professional the following year and made his first-team debut in February 1951. Though National Service prevented him from establishing himself at the club, he still managed to build a reputation as an exciting young prospect. He was purchased by Sheffield United for a £2,500 fee in June 1953. A regular in the starting eleven in the First Division, he was called up for the first of his seven England caps in May 1956. His international career lasted just 11 months, though he did score two goals against Brazil and one against West Germany. He was also twice selected for The Football League XI.

His career then declined as he struggled with an ankle injury sustained on England duty, and he was sold to Sunderland for £17,000 plus Sam Kemp (valued at £6,000) in February 1957. Sunderland were relegated out of the First Division at the end of the 1957–58 season, and he was sold to Leeds United of the Second Division for a club record £15,000 in July 1960. His damaged ankle hindered his form at Leeds, and he was sold to Third Division side Port Vale in October 1961 for £6,000. He helped Vale to knock former club Sunderland out of the FA Cup the following January but missed the end of the season with a groin injury that dogged him for the remainder of his time at Vale Park. He was not retained at the end of the 1963–64 season and signed with Fourth Division side Doncaster Rovers in August 1964. He made 41 appearances across the 1964–65 campaign, though he was dropped the following season and was released in the summer of 1966. He then had a brief spell with Macclesfield Town in the Cheshire County League, before retiring to focus on his singing career. He later spent 1969 to 1972 as player-manager of non-League village team Newmillerdam, before playing for Woolley Miners Welfare in the Yorkshire League from 1972 to 1978.

Grainger performed his first professional music gig in 1956, supporting the Hilltoppers. He appeared on television and radio and also had a ghostwritten column in the Sport Express. He was signed with the His Master's Voice label and released "This I Know"/"Are You" as a single in 1958. His footballing career restricted his singing opportunities, though he did share a bill with the Beatles in June 1963. He ended his singing career in August 1970 to focus on his new career in sales. He also supplemented his income scouting for a succession of clubs: Barnsley, Leeds United, Huddersfield Town, Oldham Athletic, Bury and Sheffield United.

== Early and personal life ==
Born in the mining village of Havercroft on 10 June 1933, his father – Daniel Grainger (1894–1967) – was a coal miner at Monckton Colliery. He had five older brothers: Leslie (born 1920), George (born 1922), Jack (born 1924), Eric (born 1926) and Horace (born 1929), though Leslie and George both died before he was born from diphtheria. His mother, Lily Grainger (née Holliday; 1900–79), gave birth to a total of seven children, with the one daughter also named Lily (born 1935). He represented Barnsley boys' team during the 1946–47 season, alongside future Munich air disaster victim Tommy Taylor and cricket umpire Dickie Bird. He attended Ryhill Junior, Ryhill Middle School, and then Felkirk Secondary School. After leaving school at the age of 15, he was employed as a car mechanic on wages that initially started on £1-a-week.

Grainger came from a footballing family, and his younger brother, Jack, spent ten years at Rotherham United just after World War II. His younger sister, Lily, went on to marry Jim Iley, who played as a wing-half for Sheffield United, Tottenham Hotspur and Nottingham Forest. His cousin, also named Jack Grainger, played in the Football League for Barnsley and Southport in the 1930s. Jack's younger brother, Dennis, played for Leeds United and Wrexham in the late 1940s. Another cousin, Edwin Holliday, went on to represent England whilst playing for Middlesbrough in 1959.

Grainger married Doreen Rowe on 3 January 1956. They had a son, Colin Junior, born on 3 July 1956. A daughter, Kim, followed on 27 February 1964. Grainger wrote his autobiography, The Singing Winger, which was published by deCoubertin Books on 17 October 2019.

== Club career ==
=== Wrexham ===
Grainger spent his youth with South Elmsall Boys before being invited for a trial at Wrexham in July 1949. He impressed Wrexham manager Les McDowall enough to earn a professional footballing apprenticeship on wages of £5-a-week. He spent the 1949–50 season playing for the reserve team in the Cheshire County League. McDowall moved on to manage Manchester City in June 1950 and invited Grainger to take a tour of Maine Road in an attempt to poach him away from Wrexham, an attempt that was thwarted when the Wrexham board heard of the news and reassured Grainger that he would be sold to a bigger club if he first proved himself at Wrexham. However, he was called up for National Service in 1951 and spent the next two years serving in the Royal Air Force. He turned professional with Wrexham on his 17th birthday, seeing an increase in wages to £8-a-week, in addition to a £10 signing-on fee. He made his first-team debut on 24 February 1951, taking Billy Tunnicliffe's spot at outside-left in a Third Division North match against Hartlepools United at the Racecourse Ground, which ended in a 1–0 home victory. His National Service limited his first-team chances under manager Peter Jackson. He failed to make an appearance in the 1951–52 season, before playing just four games of the 1952–53 campaign.

=== Sheffield United ===
On 27 June 1953, Grainger was signed by Second Division champions Sheffield United for a fee of £2,500. United manager Reg Freeman had signed his brother Jack at Rotherham United six years previously. He was placed on the maximum wage of £20-a-week and received a £10 signing-on fee. Demobbed from National Service in October, he made his first-team debut in a 1–1 draw with Charlton Athletic at Bramall Lane on 14 November, taking the place of Derek Hawksworth at outside-left. He played with his wrist in plaster as he suffered a fracture just before his demobilisation. He featured in only two further First Division matches in the 1953–54 season.

He scored his first goal in the Football League in a 4–1 home win over Tottenham Hotspur on 30 October 1954, having got the better of right-back Alf Ramsey, with one journalist reporting that "Ramsey never even attempted to match [Grainger] in speed". He scored his second goal for the "Blades" in a 3–0 home win over Manchester United two weeks later, this time getting the better of right-back Bill Foulkes. United went on to secure their First Division status with a 2–1 victory at Blackpool on 30 April, with Grainger scoring one of the goals. Another goal on the final day of the 1954–55 season took his tally to six goals in 25 appearances and helped to secure a 5–2 win over Portsmouth to leave United 13th in the table.

Freeman died of cancer in August 1955, and the team struggled at the start of the 1955–56 campaign. However, Grainger scored both goals in a 2–0 home victory over Tottenham Hotspur on 5 September, providing Joe Mercer his first win as a manager. He impressed Birmingham City manager Arthur Turner sufficiently in a 2–0 Christmas Eve victory that Mercer was forced to reject a transfer offer, as he told the press that "The answer [to enquiries for Grainger] will always be the same: no!" However, United struggled in the second half of the season and were relegated with a 3–1 defeat at Tottenham Hotspur on 28 April, Grainger scoring United's goal before centre-back Howard Johnson was forced off with injury to leave United with only ten men.

United opened the 1956–57 Second Division campaign away at Rotherham United, the first match where the two Grainger brothers would play on opposite teams, and it was the away side who claimed a 4–0 victory, with Grainger scoring two goals. As an England international playing in the second tier he found the league relatively easy, and on 1 September he secured his first career hat-trick in a 6–1 win at Barnsley after taking the bus to Oakwell as it was near the family home in Havercroft. However, an injury picked up on England duty caused him to miss six weeks going into the new year and upon his recovery Mercer informed him that the club's directors had ordered him to sell Grainger for the best possible price as quickly as possible. Wolverhampton Wanderers made an offer of £23,000, but could not pay the full amount immediately, and so Sheffield United instead accepted an offer of £17,000 plus Sam Kemp (valued at £6,000) from Sunderland. Grainger was firmly against the move, but the Sheffield United board of directors were determined to bring in a large fee to pay off creditors and Mercer illegally handed him £300 as recompense.

=== Sunderland ===
Grainger's arrival at Sunderland's Roker Park in February 1957 came at a difficult time as Bill Murray's 18-year reign as manager was coming to an end. The club was freely spending money, paying out £22,000 for Don Revie in addition to the £23,000 fee for Grainger, but were struggling near the bottom of the First Division. Sunderland spent the second half of the 1956–57 season in the bottom four and lost their final three matches, but avoided relegation as they ended the season one position and three points ahead of relegated Cardiff City. Sunderland were also charged by The Football Association with making illegal payments to players and chairman Bill Ditchburn was handed a lifetime ban from football whilst the club were fined £5,000 and Murray resigned his post.

Murray's successor as manager, Alan Brown, alienated senior players such as Billy Bingham, Don Revie and Len Shackleton, leaving Grainger to later comment that "Brown's presence had created discordance out of harmony, anxiety out of tranquillity" and "football felt like work and training felt like prison". Having been dropped to the reserves a month in the 1957–58 season, Grainger and goalkeeper Ray Daniel requested transfers. However, he stayed on Wearside and despite beating Portsmouth on the last day of the season, Sunderland occupied the final relegation place after finishing level on points with Portsmouth but with an inferior goal average; it was the first relegation in Sunderland's history since they became founder members of the Football League in 1890 and was the last time Grainger would play in the top-flight.

Grainger scored the club's first goal in the Second Division on 23 August 1958, in a 3–1 defeat at Lincoln City. He broke his collarbone in a 1–0 win over Huddersfield Town, causing him to miss five matches at a crucial time when his form was good. He was being considered again for the England squad. He totalled three goals from 37 games in the 1958–59 campaign, finding that he gelled well with new signing Ernie Taylor.

He played 41 of the club's 42 league matches in the 1959–60 season, missing only a trip to Brighton & Hove Albion on 2 January, but Sunderland laboured to a 16th-place finish. Grainger became further disillusioned and handed in a transfer request after the board of directors rejected his request for a loan to invest in a newsagent's shop in South Shields. He refused to play any matches for Sunderland in the 1960–61 season, leaving him labelled as a "rebel footballer" in the press, whilst Stan Anderson, Ernie Taylor, Alan O'Neill and Reg Pearce also demanded interviews with the board of directors to voice their dissatisfaction in the running of the club.

=== Leeds United ===
Grainger was sold to Leeds United for a club record fee of £15,000 in July 1960, a team that had just been relegated to the Second Division, and he was given an illegal signing-on fee. Manager Jack Taylor freed him of any defensive responsibilities, with left-back Grenville Hair fit and competent enough not to need any assistance from his outside-left. However, Grainger was not able to take full advantage of this tactic as his right ankle had deteriorated to the point that it needed heavy strapping. He suffered a lack of speed and confidence as a result. He did though show promising form early into his brief time at Elland Road, scoring his first goal for the club in his fourth game, a 4–4 draw at Bristol Rovers, following up with his second goal five days later in a 4–2 win at Southampton. With the maximum wage abolished in January 1961, he signed a new contract of £20-a-week. Don Revie succeeded Jack Taylor as manager in March and Grainger was in the starting eleven for Revie's first game as manager, a 3–1 loss at Charlton Athletic. However, he was dropped after suffering a knee injury and then worsened the injury in a reserve team game against Derby County. A surgeon discovered tissue damage underneath the kneecap and removed the cartilage, leaving Grainger to recover over the summer. He was still out of action at the start of the 1961–62 campaign, and with the club desperate for funds and Albert Johanneson performing well in his absence, Revie made Grainger available for transfer.

=== Port Vale ===
Grainger signed with Third Division side Port Vale when manager Norman Low paid £6,000 for his services in October 1961. Second Division Preston North End were also willing to pay the £6,000 fee, but refused to pay a signing-on fee, whilst Port Vale offered Grainger wages of £30-a-week with bonuses and a £300 signing-on fee as they wanted to match Potteries derby rivals Stoke City's ambition in re-signing Stanley Matthews. His debut was described as a 'triumphant' one as he scored in a 4–1 win over Torquay United at Vale Park on 21 October. On 27 January, he helped his new team to a 0–0 draw at former club Sunderland in the FA Cup fourth round and before the match gave his teammates placebo pills in order to boost their confidence. Four days later they completed the giant-killing with a 3–1 win at home and Grainger later commented that it was his best performance either playing for or against Sunderland. The club failed to replicate this form in the league however, and Grainger picked up a groin injury during one of coach Eric Jones's notoriously strenuous fitness sessions. He took a cortisone injection to get him through the fifth round defeat at Fulham on 17 February and then ruled himself out of action for the rest of the 1961–62 season; Vale went on to end the campaign in a disappointing 12th-position.

Low preferred Stan Edwards at outside-left at the start of the 1962–63 campaign, but Grainger was returned to the starting line-up for the third match of the season and scored in a 2–0 win over Reading. A harshly cold winter known as the "Big Freeze" savaged the footballing season and Vale went from 22 December to 2 March without fulfilling a league fixture; however, this aided Grainger as he was able to rest and heal his groin problem rather than rely on cortisone injections to mask the pain. He was however, in conflict with new manager Freddie Steele, who told him the pain in his groin was just psychological. The Big Freeze's resulting fixture congestion was too much for Grainger to cope with and he again injured his groin in a 2–1 defeat to Barnsley on 29 March and could only feature in three of the club's final 15 games as Vale went on to finish in third place, four points shy of a promotion spot.

He started the opening game of the 1963–64 season, a 1–0 defeat at Shrewsbury Town, but then missed the next seven months due to his groin injury, and Ron Smith was signed as a long-term replacement on the left-wing. Grainger played two games in March and then again returned to reserve team football. He was not offered a new contract in the summer.

=== Doncaster Rovers ===
Grainger signed with Doncaster Rovers on 7 August 1964, having been signed by outgoing manager Oscar Hold on £30-a-week wages and a £1,000 signing-on fee. Whilst training with Barnsley over the summer, chairman Joe Richards had offered to match Doncaster's contract offer, but Grainger declined as he already had a verbal agreement with Doncaster. New player-manager Bill Leivers gave debuts to Grainger and five other new signings on the opening day of the 1964–65 season, a 5–2 defeat away at Bradford (Park Avenue). However, their form soon improved. Grainger was able to manage his groin injury well enough to make 41 appearances throughout the campaign. This was despite his reputation as a former England international bringing him rough treatment from opposition defenders, so much so that he reacted to Brighton & Hove Albion winger Wally Gould's late tackles by punching Gould in the face, earning himself a red card and 21 day suspension. He then lost his first-team place at Belle Vue and featured just six times during the 1965–66 season, but turned down an offer from Football League chairman Alan Hardaker to represent Irish club Drumcondra in the European Cup. Grainger played an official game in the Football League for the final time on 15 October, away at Tranmere Rovers, but did start in another game seven days later that was abandoned because of fog. He was made available for transfer in December. Doncaster won the Fourth Division title. However, Grainger was not eligible for a medal as he had only played five league games of the 1965–66 season and was not retained in the summer.

=== Later career ===
Grainger was offered a contract by Yorkshire League club Bridlington Town, Wellington Town of the Cheshire County League, and Southern League side Poole Town. However, he instead chose to sign with Cheshire County League side Macclesfield Town after agreeing a contract of £17-a-week and £300 signing-on fee from manager Albert Leake. However, he played just four matches at Moss Rose before asking to be released in October in order to focus on his singing career. After retiring from football in 1966, he became a sales representative and later an area manager in Yorkshire. He did however, go on to serve non-League Newmillerdam as player-manager from 1969 to 1972 and went on play for Woolley Miners Welfare in the Yorkshire League from 1972 to 1978, helping the club to win promotion from Division 2 in the 1972–73 campaign and featuring in both the FA Trophy and FA Vase competitions.

In 1978, Grainger accepted an offer from Billy Bingham to scout for Mansfield Town in the North East and recommended Chris Waddle to the club, though they did not act on his recommendation. He later scouted for Allan Clarke at Barnsley and Leeds United, for Mick Buxton at Huddersfield Town and for Neil Warnock at Oldham Athletic, Bury and Sheffield United.

== International career ==
On 25 April 1956, Grainger was selected for a Football League representative match against the Irish League in Belfast, which ended in a 5–2 defeat. He earned his first England cap on 9 May 1956 in a friendly with Brazil at Wembley Stadium. He scored within the opening minutes with his first touch of the ball and in the 83rd-minute headed in England's fourth. Of his debut against Brazil, Grainger said: "When you think of the talent in that England team, with Duncan Edwards, Billy Wright and Stanley Matthews, you delight in what might have been. We will never know how good the team could have been because Munich cheated us. But in 1956, we scored four against Brazil at Wembley, and we even missed two penalties. That was how superior we were that day. Two years later, Brazil won the World Cup." He picked up two further caps in a tour of Scandinavia, in a 0–0 draw with Sweden and 5–2 victory in Finland. It was during this tour that his reputation as a singer became established after Nat Lofthouse asked him to sing at a bar attended by football journalists. The tour ended in a trip to Berlin to face West Germany on 26 May, the World Cup champions of 1954, a game England won 3–1 and that won Grainger praise from the British and German press, with England manager Walter Winterbottom effusing that "I was extremely pleased with Colin Grainger".

Grainger was selected for the British Home Championship match in Belfast against Northern Ireland on 6 October 1956 and forced goalkeeper Harry Gregg into some excellent saves to keep the game as a 1–1 draw. He was again selected for The Football League XI v Irish League match on 31 October despite suffering from a toe injury, scoring in what ended as a 3–2 victory at St James' Park. He won a sixth England cap in a 3–1 victory over Wales on 14 November, but was forced to leave the game early with a twisted ankle after stretching to receive a pass from Johnny Haynes. His seventh and final cap for England came against Scotland at Wembley on 6 April 1957, the final game of the 1956–57 British Home Championship, which ended in a 2–1 victory to secure the title for England. He provided the cross for Derek Kevan to score England's first goal of the game but otherwise felt he performed poorly and was never selected again. He never fully recovered to the standard he was at before his ankle injury, and the outside-left spot at the 1958 FIFA World Cup was taken by Alan A'Court.

== Musical career ==
Grainger signed a contract with talent agent Len Young in 1956. His first gig was as a support act to American group the Hilltoppers in Sheffield, for which he was paid £50, singing three songs from the back catalogues of Al Jolson, Nat King Cole and Billy Eckstine. Due to his footballing career he was forced to turn down the offer to join the Hilltoppers on a financially lucrative tour of the US. His performance earned him a television appearance on ITV and a regular column in the Sport Express that was written by Brian Glanville. In summer 1957 he toured England and received vocal training from talent agent Joe Collins, father of actress Joan Collins. He then performed with Jack Hylton and his orchestra on ITV's After Hours show, presented by Hughie Green, and also did a television show for the BBC with Winifred Atwell, Eric Robinson and Matt Monro. He went on to be signed to the His Master's Voice label, releasing "This I Know"/"Are You" as a single in 1958.

In February 1958, he signed a contract with MCA, which was £250 a week for the summer. He was offered the opportunity of touring Australia with comedian Nat Jackley in the summer of 1960 but turned it down as it would interfere with his pre-season football training. On 13 June 1963, he shared a bill with the Beatles in Stockport, who received the same £50 fee as Grainger after having agreed to the gig some months earlier before their recent chart success with "Please Please Me" and "From Me to You". He gave his final performance in Leeds in August 1970 when he retired from performing to focus on his career in sales.

During his time as a footballer, he was known as 'the singing winger' due to his vocal talent and performing at pubs and clubs. Of his singing career, Grainger said: "I was far more nervous before a gig than before a match. In football, you're one man of 11, but in singing, you're one man of one." Entertainment magazine The Stage described him as "a very pleasing vocalist, notable for a small style and ability to sustain long notes".

== Later life ==
He became a widower and moved into a care home in Kirklees in March 2020, which led to the local council leader stating that "I was amazed when I heard that we have such a footballing legend who is in our care". He died on 19 June 2022, aged 89.

== Career statistics ==
=== Club ===
Appearances and goals by club, season and competition
Club	Season	League			FA Cup		Other		Total	
Club	Season	Division	Apps	Goals	Apps	Goals	Apps	Goals	Apps	Goals
Wrexham	1950–51	Third Division North	1	0	0	0	0	0	1	0
Wrexham	1951–52	Third Division North	0	0	0	0	0	0	0	0
Wrexham	1952–53	Third Division North	4	0	0	0	0	0	4	0
Wrexham	Total		5	0	0	0	0	0	5	0
Sheffield United	1953–54	First Division	3	0	0	0	—		3	0
Sheffield United	1954–55	First Division	25	6	0	0	—		25	6
Sheffield United	1955–56	First Division	39	8	4	1	—		43	9
Sheffield United	1956–57	Second Division	21	12	3	0	—		24	12
Sheffield United	Total		88	26	7	1	0	0	95	27
Sunderland	1956–57	First Division	13	1	0	0	—		13	1
Sunderland	1957–58	First Division	30	4	1	0	—		31	4
Sunderland	1958–59	Second Division	36	3	1	0	—		37	3
Sunderland	1959–60	Second Division	41	6	2	0	—		43	6
Sunderland	Total		120	14	4	0	0	0	124	14
Leeds United	1960–61	Second Division	41	6	2	0	0	0	43	6
Port Vale	1961–62	Third Division	11	1	7	0	0	0	18	1
Port Vale	1962–63	Third Division	25	5	3	2	1 (Note: Appearances in League Cup)	0	29	7
Port Vale	1963–64	Third Division	3	0	0	0	0	0	3	0
Port Vale	Total		39	6	10	2	1	0	50	8
Doncaster Rovers	1964–65	Fourth Division	35	3	3	0	3	0	41	3
Doncaster Rovers	1965–66	Fourth Division	5	0	0	0	1	0	6	0
Doncaster Rovers	Total		40	3	3	0	4	0	47	3
Macclesfield Town	1966–67	Cheshire County League	3	0	0	0	1	0	4	0
Career total			336	55	26	3	6	0	368	58

=== International ===
Appearances and goals by national team and year
National team	Year	Apps	Goals
England	1956	6	3
England	1957	1	0
Total		7	3

== Honours ==
England

- British Home Championship: 1956–57

Woolley Miners Welfare

- Yorkshire League Division 2 promotion: 1972–73
