= John Grainger =

John Grainger may refer to:

- John Grainger (antiquarian), Irish cleric and antiquarian
- John Harry Grainger, architect and civil engineer
- John Grainger (footballer, born 1912), English professional footballer
- John Grainger (footballer, born 1924), English professional footballer
- John Grainger (politician) (1803–1872), real estate investor and member of the South Australian Legislative Council

== See also ==
- Jack Grainger (disambiguation)
- John Granger, speaker and writer
- John Granger (footballer), Scottish footballer
