= 2019–20 Manchester City F.C. season =

English football club season

Manchester City
2019–20 season
- Owner: City Football Group
- Chairman: Khaldoon Al Mubarak
- Manager: Pep Guardiola
- Stadium: City of Manchester Stadium
- Premier League: 2nd
- FA Cup: Semi-finals
- EFL Cup: Winners
- FA Community Shield: Winners
- UEFA Champions League: Quarter-finals
- Top goalscorer: League: Raheem Sterling (20); All: Raheem Sterling (31)
- Highest home attendance: 54,512 vs. Sheffield United, 29 December 2019
- Lowest home attendance: 37,143 vs. Southampton, 29 October 2019
- Average home league attendance: 53,097 (Note: The last six matches were played behind closed doors due to the COVID-19 pandemic.)
Home colours	Away colours	Third colours

The 2019–20 season was Manchester City's 118th season of competitive football, 91st season in the top flight of English football and 23rd season in the Premier League. In addition to the league, the club competed in the FA Cup, as holders of both competitions. They also entered the UEFA Champions League, hoping to win the team's first European trophy since 1970. At the start of the season, City defeated Liverpool to win their second consecutive and sixth overall Community Shield. The Citizens also successfully retained the EFL Cup, making it their third consecutive League Cup win and their fifth in seven seasons.

The season covered the period from 1 July 2019 to 31 August 2020, having been extended from 30 June 2020 for an indefinite period following the suspension of all elite sport in the UK in March 2020 as part of the response to the COVID-19 pandemic. The domestic season resumed on 17 June, and concluded on 26 July, while the Champions League resumed on 7 August.

This was the first season since 2007–08 without former captain Vincent Kompany, who departed to Anderlecht.

== Kits ==
Supplier: Puma / Sponsor: Etihad Airways (Front) / Nexen Tire (Sleeves)

Home	Home alternate	Away	Third	Special retro kit (Note: Used in the Community Shield against Liverpool.)	2020–21 home kit (Note: Used in the FA Cup semi-finals again Arsenal, in league games 37 and 38 against Watford and Norwich City respectively, in the Champions League Round of 16 return leg against Real Madrid and in the quarter-final against Lyon.)

== Season review ==
Manchester City began the season as unprecedented holders of all four domestic competitions. Their first successful defence came on 4 August, as they defeated Liverpool on penalties at Wembley in the 2019 FA Community Shield, the traditional curtain raiser to the season.

Acknowledging that City would be judged by their Champions League performance after all, Pep Guardiola said that the new season's main objective would be to win the European title. The Cityzens progressed to the knockout phase as comfortable group winners and faced old foes Real Madrid there. City won the away game 2–1, but the remainder of the tournament was indefinitely postponed due to the COVID-19 pandemic. Eventually, UEFA announced that the tournament would be resumed in August 2020 behind closed doors. After eight domestic trophies were clinched with Guardiola, fans eagerly await the team's first European title since 1970. The home match against Madrid was scheduled for 7 August. Thanks to goals from Raheem Sterling and Gabriel Jesus, the Citizens once again defeated Madrid 2–1, achieving a 4–2 victory on aggregate and advancing to the quarter-finals. However, Manchester City once again exited the competition at the next stage, losing 1–3 to Lyon on 15 August in a one-off game held at the neutral Estádio José Alvalade in Lisbon.

In the Premier League, City were unable to maintain their consistency from the previous two seasons. Key players Aymeric Laporte and Leroy Sané endured extended injury layoffs from the beginning of the season until early 2020. Laporte's absence in particular impacted the team's defensive capabilities and their effectiveness against opposition set up to quickly counterattack on the break. City already dropped more league points (19) by the end of December 2019 than they had in their entire previous two seasons.

For the second year in a row, City were the first top European team to reach 100 goals scored in all competitions when they beat Fulham 4–0 in an FA Cup fourth-round match on 26 January 2020.

On 14 February 2020, UEFA stated its intention to ban Manchester City from the all UEFA club competitions for the 2020–21 and 2021–22 seasons for alleged breaches of the UEFA Financial Fair Play Regulations. UEFA noted the club's right to appeal at the Court of Arbitration for Sport (CAS), and Manchester City then submitted an appeal on 26 February 2020. As part of the appeal registration, the Court of Arbitration for Sport stated a date for the final decision would be in the first half of July 2020. The appeal was heard on 8 June 2020 and upheld on 13 July, with the ban overturned.

On 1 March 2020, City won their third EFL Cup in a row and their fourth in five seasons, defeating Aston Villa 2–1 at Wembley Stadium in the final.

In March, the season became affected by the COVID-19 pandemic. On 10 March, the match between Manchester City and Arsenal, due to be played the next day, was postponed after a number of Arsenal players made close contact with Olympiacos owner Evangelos Marinakis, who had tested positive for infection with the coronavirus, when the two teams had met in the Europa League 13 days earlier. On 12 March, it was revealed that three Leicester City players were self-isolating. Manchester City also announced that their defender Benjamin Mendy was also self-isolating, after a family member displayed symptoms of the virus. Later in the evening, it was confirmed that Arsenal head coach Mikel Arteta had tested positive for coronavirus. On 13 March, following an emergency meeting between the Premier League, The Football Association (FA), the English Football League and the FA Women's Super League, it was unanimously decided to suspend professional football in England until at least 4 April 2020. On 19 March, the suspension was extended to at least 30 April 2020. At the same time, the FA agreed to extend the season indefinitely, past the scheduled end date of 1 June.

In late May 2020, the UK Government began to ease the lockdown measures, which had been taken to combat the COVID-19 contagion, and it was duly announced on 28 May that the Premier League clubs had agreed to play the remaining 92 Premier League and FA Cup fixtures in empty stadiums and with modified rules to minimise contagion from 17 June 2020 onward. City restarted the season with a postponed game in hand against Arsenal on 17 June, winning 3–0. On 25 June, City lost 2–1 away to Chelsea, and as a result Liverpool were confirmed as 2019–20 Premier League champions with seven rounds of games to be played. A week later, on 2 July, City were able to assuage some of the disappointment of losing the Premier League title to their rivals when they beat Liverpool 4–0 in a home league match, with a fifth goal in stoppage time disallowed by the VAR, also avenging November's controversial 1–3 loss.

In beating Newcastle United 5–0 on 8 July, City achieved a pass completion rate of 93.7% – the highest accuracy on record in the Premier League since 2003–04 (when detailed passing statistics were first measured). Riyad Mahrez reaching 10 Premier League goals in the season in the same game also ensured City would be the first English top-flight side to have five different players score at least 10 league goals in a single season since Everton in 1984–85 (Sterling, De Bruyne, Agüero, Jesus, Mahrez). The 5–0 away victory against Brighton & Hove Albion on 11 July then confirmed that City would finish the season as runners-up to Liverpool in the league. The Blues scored 102 league goals in 2019–20; it was the fifth time they reached a century of goals after 1936–37, 1957–58, 2013–14 and 2017–18, an English record.

In the restarted FA Cup, City defeated Newcastle 2–0 away from home on 28 June, advancing to the semi-finals where they faced Arsenal at Wembley. However, inform Aubameyang scored a brace and lukewarm City were shut out, being denied an opportunity to defend their title in a showcase final. The Gunners went on to win a record 14th FA Cup title in the final, defeating Chelsea.

The end of the 2019–20 season marked the end of David Silva's ten-year stint with the club. Silva's final appearance in the Champions League quarter-final defeat to Lyon was his 436th for City; in doing so he entered the top 10 all-time appearance makers for the club, as well as becoming the first modern-era player to reach this level in 34 years. Silva also ended his career at City as the club's most decorated player at the time, with fourteen league and cup winner medals. Due to COVID-19 precautions, Silva's final appearances had to be played behind closed doors. City hoped there would be an opportunity in the following season for fans to return in order to give him a proper sendoff.

Kevin De Bruyne was recognised in the end of season awards for his performances at City, being named the Premier League Player of the Season and PFA Players' Player of the Year, despite Liverpool winning the Premier League title that year. De Bruyne had already won the club's own Player of the Season Award for the third time in five years, and the Premier League's Playmaker of the Season award for providing a league-leading 20 assists, equalling the record of most assists in a Premier League season set by Thierry Henry in 2002–03.

== Pre-season and friendlies ==
Win Draw Loss Manchester City played a number of pre-season matches in 2019, including the 2019 Premier League Asia Trophy in China.

17 July 2019 PL Asia Trophy Semi-final	Manchester City	4–1	West Ham United	Nanjing, China
20:30 CST	D. Silva 33'; Nmecha 36' (pen.); Sterling 59', 72'	Report	Noble 26' (pen.)	Stadium: Nanjing Olympic Sports Centre; Referee: Craig Pawson (England)

20 July 2019 PL Asia Trophy Final	Wolverhampton Wanderers	0–0 (3–2 p)	Manchester City	Shanghai, China
19:30 CST	Coady (yellow card) 76'	Report		Stadium: Hongkou Football Stadium; Referee: Martin Atkinson (England)
	Penalties
	Coady (penalty missed); Bennett (penalty scored); Kilman (penalty missed); Perry (penalty scored); Vinagre (penalty scored)		(penalty missed) Gündoğan; (penalty missed) D. Silva; (penalty scored) Danilo; (penalty scored) García; (penalty missed) Nmecha

24 July 2019 Friendly	Kitchee SC	1–6	Manchester City	Causeway Bay, Hong Kong
20:00 HKT	Law Tsz Chun 85'	Report	D. Silva 13'; Sané 40', 55'; Sterling 43'; Touaizi 80'; Pozo 88'	Stadium: Hong Kong Stadium

27 July 2019 EuroJapan Cup	Yokohama F. Marinos	1–3	Manchester City	Yokohama, Japan
19:30 JST	Endo 23', (yellow card) 29'; Park (yellow card) 36'	Report	De Bruyne 18'; Sterling 40'; Nmecha 90+2'	Stadium: Nissan Stadium; Attendance: 65,052

== Competitions ==
Win Draw Loss

=== Overview ===
Competition	Record							
Competition	Pld	W	D	L	GF	GA	GD	Win %
Premier League	38	26	3	9	102	35	+67	68.42
FA Cup	5	4	0	1	11	3	+8	80.00
EFL Cup	6	5	0	1	14	5	+9	83.33
FA Community Shield	1	0	1	0	1	1	+0	0.00
UEFA Champions League	9	6	2	1	21	9	+12	66.67
Total	59	41	6	12	149	53	+96	69.49

Source: Competitions

=== FA Community Shield ===
Due to winning both the 2018–19 Premier League and 2018–19 FA Cup, Manchester City faced Premier League runners-up Liverpool in the FA Community Shield. Manchester City were the defending champions and successfully defended their title.

4 August 2019 Final	Liverpool	1–1 (4–5 p)	Manchester City	London
15:00 BST	Matip 77'	Report	Sterling 12'; De Bruyne (yellow card) 33'	Stadium: Wembley Stadium; Attendance: 77,565; Referee: Martin Atkinson
	Penalties
	Shaqiri (penalty scored); Wijnaldum (penalty missed); Lallana (penalty scored); Oxlade-Chamberlain (penalty scored); Salah (penalty scored)		(penalty scored) Gündoğan; (penalty scored) B. Silva; (penalty scored) Foden; (penalty scored) Zinchenko; (penalty scored) Gabriel Jesus
Note: Manchester City manager Pep Guardiola was cautioned (yellow card) in the 42nd minute. Live on BT Sport

=== Premier League ===
Manchester City entered the 2019–20 Premier League as two-time defending champions.

==== League table ====
Pos	Team	Pld	W	D	L	GF	GA	GD	Pts	Qualification or relegation
1	Liverpool (C)	38	32	3	3	85	33	+52	99	Qualification for the Champions League group stage
2	Manchester City	38	26	3	9	102	35	+67	81	Qualification for the Champions League group stage
3	Manchester United	38	18	12	8	66	36	+30	66	Qualification for the Champions League group stage
4	Chelsea	38	20	6	12	69	54	+15	66	Qualification for the Champions League group stage
5	Leicester City	38	18	8	12	67	41	+26	62	Qualification for the Europa League group stage

Source: Premier League
Rules for classification: 1) Points; 2) Goal difference; 3) Goals scored; 4) If the champions, relegated teams or qualified teams for UEFA competitions cannot be determined by rules 1 to 3, rules 4.1 to 4.3 are applied – 4.1) Points gained in head to head record between such teams; 4.2) Away goals scored in head to head record between such teams; 4.3) Play-offs
(C) Champions

==== Results summary ====
Overall								Home						Away					
Pld	W	D	L	GF	GA	GD	Pts	W	D	L	GF	GA	GD	W	D	L	GF	GA	GD
38	26	3	9	102	35	+67	81	15	2	2	57	13	+44	11	1	7	45	22	+23

Source: Premier League

==== Results by matchday ====
Matchday	1	2	3	4	5	6	7	8	9	10	11	12	13	14	15	16	17	18	19	20	21	22	23	24	25	26	27	28	29	30	31	32	33	34	35	36	37	38
Ground	A	H	A	H	A	H	A	H	A	H	H	A	H	A	A	H	A	H	A	H	H	A	H	A	A	H	A	A	H	H	A	H	A	H	A	H	A	H
Result	W	D	W	W	L	W	W	L	W	W	W	L	W	D	W	L	W	W	L	W	W	W	D	W	L	W	W	L	W	W	L	W	L	W	W	W	W	W
Position	1	3	2	2	2	2	2	2	2	2	2	4	3	3	3	3	3	3	3	3	3	2	2	2	2	2	2	2	2	2	2	2	2	2	2	2	2	2

Source: Premier League
A = Away; H = Home; W = Win; D = Draw; L = Loss

==== Fixtures ====
On 13 June 2019, the Premier League fixtures were announced.

10 August 2019 1	West Ham United	0–5	Manchester City	Stratford
12:30 BST	Balbuena (yellow card) 61'; Felipe Anderson (yellow card) 62'	Report	Gabriel Jesus 25'; Sterling 51', 75', 90+1', (yellow card) 90+3'; Agüero 86' (pen.); Walker (yellow card) 87'	Stadium: London Stadium; Attendance: 59,870; Referee: Mike Dean
Note: Live on BT Sport

17 August 2019 2	Manchester City	2–2	Tottenham Hotspur	Manchester
17:30 BST	Sterling 20', (yellow card) 26'; Agüero 35'	Report	Lamela 23'; Lucas 56'	Stadium: City of Manchester Stadium; Attendance: 54,503; Referee: Michael Oliver
Note: Live on Sky Sports

25 August 2019 3	Bournemouth	1–3	Manchester City	Bournemouth
14:00 BST	H. Wilson 45+3'; Lerma (yellow card) 56'	Report	Walker (yellow card) 10'; Ederson (yellow card) 13'; Agüero 15', 64'; Sterling 43'; Otamendi (yellow card) 90'	Stadium: Vitality Stadium; Attendance: 10,486; Referee: Andre Marriner
Note: Live on Sky Sports

31 August 2019 4	Manchester City	4–0	Brighton & Hove Albion	Manchester
15:00 BST	De Bruyne 2'; Laporte (yellow card) 36'; Agüero 42', 55'; B. Silva 79'	Report	Dunk (yellow card) 83'	Stadium: City of Manchester Stadium; Attendance: 54,386; Referee: Jon Moss

14 September 2019 5	Norwich City	3–2	Manchester City	Norwich
17:30 BST	McLean 18', (yellow card) 64'; Cantwell 28', (yellow card) 87'; Byram (yellow card) 45+2'; Pukki 50'	Report	Agüero 45'; B. Silva (yellow card) 69'; Rodri 88'	Stadium: Carrow Road; Attendance: 27,035; Referee: Kevin Friend
Note: Live on Sky Sports

21 September 2019 6	Manchester City	8–0	Watford	Manchester
15:00 BST	D. Silva 1'; Agüero 7' (pen.); Mahrez 12'; B. Silva 15', 48', 60', (yellow card) 19'; Otamendi 18'; Angeliño (yellow card) 81'; De Bruyne 84'	Report	Femenía (yellow card) 59'; Deulofeu (yellow card) 59'	Stadium: City of Manchester Stadium; Attendance: 54,273; Referee: Mike Dean

28 September 2019 7	Everton	1–3	Manchester City	Liverpool
17:30 BST	Calvert-Lewin 33'; Schneiderlin (yellow card) 59'; Mina (yellow card) 70'	Report	Gabriel Jesus 24'; Rodri (yellow card) 38'; Otamendi (yellow card) 51'; Mahrez 71'; Sterling 84'	Stadium: Goodison Park; Attendance: 39,222; Referee: Michael Oliver
Note: Live on Sky Sports

6 October 2019 8	Manchester City	0–2	Wolverhampton Wanderers	Manchester
14:00 BST	Rodri (yellow card) 50'; Cancelo (yellow card) 50'; Ederson (yellow card) 62'; Gündoğan (yellow card) 71'; Fernandinho (yellow card) 76'	Report	Traoré 80', 90+4'; Neves (yellow card) 84'; Moutinho (yellow card) 86'	Stadium: City of Manchester Stadium; Attendance: 54,435; Referee: Craig Pawson

19 October 2019 9	Crystal Palace	0–2	Manchester City	Selhurst
17:30 BST	Milivojević (yellow card) 13'	Report	Gabriel Jesus 39'; D. Silva 41'; Sterling (yellow card) 46'	Stadium: Selhurst Park; Attendance: 25,480; Referee: Anthony Taylor
Note: Live on Sky Sports

26 October 2019 10	Manchester City	3–0	Aston Villa	Manchester
12:30 BST	Sterling 46'; Fernandinho (yellow card) 57' (yellow-red card) 87'; D. Silva 65'; Gündoğan 70', (yellow card) 81'	Report	Grealish (yellow card) 36'	Stadium: City of Manchester Stadium; Attendance: 54,506; Referee: Graham Scott
Note: Live on BT Sport

2 November 2019 11	Manchester City	2–1	Southampton	Manchester
15:00 GMT	Sterling (yellow card) 40'; Agüero 70'; Walker 86'; Gündoğan (yellow card) 89'; Ederson (yellow card) 90+5'	Report	Ward-Prowse 13'; Højbjerg (yellow card) 18'	Stadium: City of Manchester Stadium; Attendance: 53,922; Referee: Lee Mason

10 November 2019 12	Liverpool	3–1	Manchester City	Liverpool
16:30 GMT	Fabinho 6'; Salah 13'; Mané 51'	Report	Rodri (yellow card) 65'; B. Silva 78'; Gabriel Jesus (yellow card) 90+5'	Stadium: Anfield; Attendance: 53,324; Referee: Michael Oliver
Note: Live on Sky Sports

23 November 2019 13	Manchester City	2–1	Chelsea	Manchester
17:30 GMT	De Bruyne 29'; Mahrez 37'; Gündoğan (yellow card) 90+2'	Report	Kanté 21'; Jorginho (yellow card) 61'	Stadium: City of Manchester Stadium; Attendance: 54,486; Referee: Martin Atkinson
Note: Live on Sky Sports

30 November 2019 14	Newcastle United	2–2	Manchester City	Newcastle
12:30 GMT	Willems 25'; Manquillo (yellow card) 73'; Shelvey 88'	Report	Sterling 22'; Gündoğan (yellow card) 24'; Fernandinho (yellow card) 53'; De Bruyne 82'	Stadium: St James' Park; Attendance: 49,937; Referee: Chris Kavanagh

3 December 2019 15	Burnley	1–4	Manchester City	Burnley
20:15 GMT	Hendrick (yellow card) 86'; Brady 89'	Report	B. Silva (yellow card) 15'; Gabriel Jesus 24', 50'; Rodri 68'; Mahrez 87'	Stadium: Turf Moor; Attendance: 20,101; Referee: Jon Moss

7 December 2019 16	Manchester City	1–2	Manchester United	Manchester
17:30 GMT	B. Silva (yellow card) 22'; De Bruyne (yellow card) 79'; Otamendi 85'; Walker (yellow card) 90+4'	Report	Rashford 23' (pen.); Martial 29'; De Gea (yellow card) 54'; Pereira (yellow card) 74'	Stadium: City of Manchester Stadium; Attendance: 54,403; Referee: Anthony Taylor

15 December 2019 17	Arsenal	0–3	Manchester City	Holloway
16:30 GMT	Papastathopoulos (yellow card) 72'	Report	De Bruyne 2', 40'; Sterling 15'; Fernandinho (yellow card) 17'; Rodri (yellow card) 34'; Gündoğan (yellow card) 61'; Mendy (yellow card) 62'	Stadium: Emirates Stadium; Attendance: 60,031; Referee: Paul Tierney

21 December 2019 18	Manchester City	3–1	Leicester City	Manchester
17:30 GMT	Mahrez 30'; Gündoğan 43' (pen.), (yellow card) 71'; De Bruyne (yellow card) 59'; Gabriel Jesus 69'	Report	Vardy 22'; Söyüncü (yellow card) 35'; Ndidi (yellow card) 51'	Stadium: City of Manchester Stadium; Attendance: 54,415; Referee: Mike Dean

27 December 2019 19	Wolverhampton Wanderers	3–2	Manchester City	Wolverhampton
19:45 GMT	Traoré 55'; Jiménez 82'; Doherty 89'	Report	Ederson (red card) 12'; Sterling (penalty missed) 25' 25', 50'; Otamendi (yellow card) 60'	Stadium: Molineux; Attendance: 31,737; Referee: Martin Atkinson

29 December 2019 20	Manchester City	2–0	Sheffield United	Manchester
18:00 GMT	Agüero 52'; B. Silva (yellow card) 59'; De Bruyne 82'	Report	Stevens (yellow card) 85'	Stadium: City of Manchester Stadium; Attendance: 54,512; Referee: Chris Kavanagh

1 January 2020 21	Manchester City	2–1	Everton	Manchester
17:30 GMT	Gabriel Jesus 51', 58'	Report	Mina (yellow card) 30'; Delph (yellow card) 69'; Richarlison 71'; Davies (yellow card) 79'; Calvert-Lewin (yellow card) 86'	Stadium: City of Manchester Stadium; Attendance: 54,407; Referee: Andre Marriner

12 January 2020 22	Aston Villa	1–6	Manchester City	Birmingham
16:30 GMT	El Ghazi (yellow card) 53', (goal) 90+1' (pen.); Grealish (yellow card) 80'	Report	Mahrez 18', 24'; Agüero 28', 57', 81'; Gabriel Jesus 45+1'; Fernandinho (yellow card) 50'	Stadium: Villa Park; Attendance: 41,823; Referee: Jon Moss

18 January 2020 23	Manchester City	2–2	Crystal Palace	Manchester
15:00 GMT	Mendy (yellow card) 58'; Agüero 82', 87'	Report	McArthur (yellow card) 13'; Ayew (yellow card) 26'; Tosun 39'; Fernandinho 90' (o.g.)	Stadium: City of Manchester Stadium; Attendance: 54,439; Referee: Graham Scott

21 January 2020 24	Sheffield United	0–1	Manchester City	Sheffield
19:30 GMT	Bešić (yellow card) 13'; Norwood (yellow card) 24'; Fleck (yellow card) 43'; McBurnie (yellow card) 84'	Report	Gabriel Jesus (penalty missed) 36'; Fernandinho (yellow card) 45+2'; Rodri (yellow card) 53'; Agüero 73', (yellow card) 83'	Stadium: Bramall Lane; Attendance: 31,285; Referee: Lee Mason

2 February 2020 25	Tottenham Hotspur	2–0	Manchester City	Tottenham
16:30 GMT	Alderweireld (yellow card) 42'; Bergwijn 63'; Lo Celso (yellow card) 66'; Son 71'	Report	Sterling (yellow card) 12'; Walker (yellow card) 33'; Gündoğan (penalty missed) 40'; Zinchenko (yellow card) 42' (yellow-red card) 60'; Rodri (yellow card) 90+4'	Stadium: Tottenham Hotspur Stadium; Attendance: 61,022; Referee: Mike Dean

19 February 2020 26	Manchester City	2–0	West Ham United	Manchester
19:30 GMT	Rodri 30'; De Bruyne 62'	Report	Masuaku (yellow card) 45'	Stadium: City of Manchester Stadium; Attendance: 52,159; Referee: Kevin Friend
Note: Match originally scheduled for 9 February 2020 but delayed due to poor weather conditions caused by Storm Ciara.

22 February 2020 27	Leicester City	0–1	Manchester City	Leicester
17:30 GMT		Report	Agüero (penalty missed) 62'; Gabriel Jesus 80'	Stadium: King Power Stadium; Attendance: 32,068; Referee: Paul Tierney

8 March 2020 28	Manchester United	2–0	Manchester City	Manchester
16:30 GMT	Martial 30'; Fred (yellow card) 42'; Maguire (yellow card) 90+5'; McTominay 90+6'	Report	Fernandinho (yellow card) 29'; Rodri (yellow card) 30'; Cancelo (yellow card) 59'; Gabriel Jesus (yellow card) 90+8'	Stadium: Old Trafford; Attendance: 73,288; Referee: Mike Dean

17 June 2020 29	Manchester City	3–0	Arsenal	Manchester
20:15 BST	Sterling 45+2'; De Bruyne 51' (pen.); Rodri (yellow card) 79'; Foden 90+1'	Report	David Luiz (red card) 49'; Tierney (yellow card) 76'	Stadium: City of Manchester Stadium; Attendance: 0 Referee: Anthony Taylor
Note: The match was initially postponed from 1 March to 11 March due to Manchester City's involvement in the 2020 EFL Cup Final. Later, it was again postponed following fears that Arsenal personnel had come into contact with Olympiacos owner Evangelos Marinakis, who was carrying the coronavirus. The match was ultimately rescheduled to 17 June.

22 June 2020 30	Manchester City	5–0	Burnley	Manchester
20:00 BST	Foden 22', 63'; Mahrez 43', 45+3' (pen.); D. Silva 51'; Cancelo (yellow card) 62'	Report	Brownhill (yellow card) 43'	Stadium: City of Manchester Stadium; Attendance: 0 Referee: Andre Marriner
Note: The match was postponed on 13 March due to concerns over the coronavirus pandemic, and rescheduled to 22 June.

25 June 2020 31	Chelsea	2–1	Manchester City	London
20:15 BST	Pulisic 36'; Alonso (yellow card) 38'; Willian 78' (pen.)	Report	De Bruyne 55', (yellow card) 76'; Fernandinho (red card) 77'	Stadium: Stamford Bridge; Attendance: 0 Referee: Stuart Attwell
Note: The match was postponed on 19 March due to concerns over the coronavirus pandemic, and rescheduled to 25 June.

2 July 2020 32	Manchester City	4–0	Liverpool	Manchester
20:15 BST	De Bruyne 25' (pen.); Sterling 35'; Mendy (yellow card) 41'; Foden 45'; Walker (yellow card) 57'; Oxlade-Chamberlain 66' (o.g.)	Report	Gomez (yellow card) 24'; Henderson (yellow card) 90+1'	Stadium: City of Manchester Stadium; Attendance: 0 Referee: Anthony Taylor
Note: The match was postponed on 19 March due to concerns over the coronavirus pandemic, and rescheduled to 2 July.

5 July 2020 33	Southampton	1–0	Manchester City	Southampton
19:00 BST	Adams 16'; Romeu (yellow card) 45'	Report	Fernandinho (yellow card) 57'; Gabriel Jesus (yellow card) 86'	Stadium: St. Mary's Stadium; Attendance: 0 Referee: Andre Marriner
Note: The match was postponed on 19 March due to concerns over the coronavirus pandemic, and rescheduled to 5 July.

8 July 2020 34	Manchester City	5–0	Newcastle United	Manchester
18:00 BST	Gabriel Jesus 10'; Mahrez 21'; Fernández 58' (o.g.); D. Silva 65'; Sterling 90+1'	Report		Stadium: City of Manchester Stadium; Attendance: 0 Referee: Andrew Madley
Note: The match was postponed on 3 April due to concerns over the coronavirus pandemic, and rescheduled to 8 July.

11 July 2020 35	Brighton & Hove Albion	0–5	Manchester City	Falmer
20:00 BST	Bissouma (yellow card) 83'	Report	Sterling 21', 53', 81'; Gabriel Jesus 44'; B. Silva 56'	Stadium: Falmer Stadium; Attendance: 0 Referee: Graham Scott
Note: The match was postponed on 3 April due to concerns over the coronavirus pandemic, and rescheduled to 11 July.

15 July 2020 36	Manchester City	2–1	Bournemouth	Manchester
18:00 BST	D. Silva 6'; Gabriel Jesus 39'; García (yellow card) 90+4'	Report	Kelly (yellow card) 17'; Brooks 88'	Stadium: City of Manchester Stadium; Attendance: 0 Referee: Lee Mason
Note: The match was postponed on 3 April due to concerns over the coronavirus pandemic, and rescheduled to 15 July.

21 July 2020 37	Watford	0–4	Manchester City	Watford
18:00 BST	Mariappa (yellow card) 80'; Hughes (yellow card) 90+1'	Report	Sterling 31', 40', (penalty missed) 40'; Foden 63'; Laporte 66'	Stadium: Vicarage Road; Attendance: 0 Referee: Michael Oliver
Note: The match was postponed on 3 April due to concerns over the coronavirus pandemic, and rescheduled to 21 July.

26 July 2020 38	Manchester City	5–0	Norwich City	Manchester
16:00 BST	Gabriel Jesus 11'; De Bruyne 45+1', 90'; Cancelo (yellow card) 51'; Sterling 79'; Mahrez 83'	Report	Zimmermann (yellow card) 90+1'	Stadium: City of Manchester Stadium; Attendance: 0 Referee: Craig Pawson
Note: The match was postponed on 3 April due to concerns over the coronavirus pandemic, and rescheduled to 26 July.

=== FA Cup ===
Manchester City entered the FA Cup in the third round as defending champions. The third-round draw was made on 2 December 2019. The fourth-round draw was made by Alex Scott and David O'Leary on Monday, 6 January 2020. The draw for the fifth round was made on 27 January 2020, live on The One Show.

4 January 2020 Third round	Manchester City	4–1	Port Vale	Manchester
19:31 GMT	Zinchenko 20'; Agüero 42'; Harwood-Bellis 58'; Foden 76'	Report	Pope 35'	Stadium: City of Manchester Stadium; Attendance: 52,433; Referee: Lee Mason

26 January 2020 Fourth round	Manchester City	4–0	Fulham	Manchester
13:00 GMT	Gündoğan 8' (pen.); B. Silva 19'; Gabriel Jesus 72', 75'	Report	Ream (red card) 6'; Bryan (yellow card) 90+1'	Stadium: City of Manchester Stadium; Attendance: 39,223; Referee: Kevin Friend

4 March 2020 Fifth round	Sheffield Wednesday	0–1	Manchester City	Sheffield
19:45 GMT	Palmer (yellow card) 36'	Report	Agüero 53'; Mahrez (yellow card) 88'	Stadium: Hillsborough Stadium; Attendance: 20,995; Referee: Michael Oliver

28 June 2020 Quarter-finals	Newcastle United	0–2	Manchester City	Newcastle upon Tyne
18:00 BST	Carroll (yellow card) 61'; Joelinton (yellow card) 90+2'	Report	De Bruyne 37' (pen.); Sterling 68'	Stadium: St James' Park; Attendance: 0 Referee: Lee Mason
Note: The match was postponed due to the COVID-19 pandemic, and rescheduled to 28 June.

18 July 2020 Semi-finals	Arsenal	2–0	Manchester City	Wembley
19:45 BST	Aubameyang 19', 71'	Report		Stadium: Wembley Stadium; Attendance: 0 Referee: Jon Moss

=== EFL Cup ===
Manchester City entered the EFL Cup in the third round as defending champions. The third-round draw was confirmed on 28 August 2019, live on Sky Sports. The draw for the fourth round was made on 25 September 2019. The quarter-finals draw was conducted on 31 October, live on BBC Radio 2.

24 September 2019 Third round	Preston North End	0–3	Manchester City	Preston
19:45 BST	Harrop (yellow card) 51'	Report	Sterling 19'; Gabriel Jesus 35'; Ledson 42' (o.g.)	Stadium: Deepdale; Attendance: 22,025; Referee: Lee Mason

29 October 2019 Fourth round	Manchester City	3–1	Southampton	Manchester
19:45 GMT	Otamendi 20'; Agüero 38', 56'	Report	Romeu (yellow card) 33'; Stephens 75'	Stadium: City of Manchester Stadium; Attendance: 37,143; Referee: Jon Moss

18 December 2019 Quarter-finals	Oxford United	1–3	Manchester City	Oxford
19:45 GMT	Taylor 46'	Report	Cancelo 22'; Sterling 51', 70'	Stadium: The Kassam Stadium; Attendance: 11,817; Referee: Andrew Madley

7 January 2020 Semi-finals First Leg	Manchester United	1–3	Manchester City	Manchester
20:00 GMT	Lingard (yellow card) 35'; Fred (yellow card) 52'; Rashford 70'; Williams (yellow card) 73'	Report	B. Silva 17'; Mahrez 33'; Pereira 39' (o.g.); Rodri (yellow card) 63'; Walker (yellow card) 82'	Stadium: Old Trafford; Attendance: 69,023; Referee: Mike Dean

29 January 2020 Semi-finals Second Leg	Manchester City	0–1 (3–2 agg.)	Manchester United	Manchester
19:45 GMT	Rodri (yellow card) 57'; Otamendi (yellow card) 87'	Report	Matić 35', (yellow card) 51' (yellow-red card) 76'; Wan-Bissaka (yellow card) 90+4'	Stadium: City of Manchester Stadium; Attendance: 51,000; Referee: Kevin Friend

1 March 2020 Final	Aston Villa	1–2	Manchester City	London
16:30 GMT	Samatta 41'; Elmohamady (yellow card) 68'; Nakamba (yellow card) 72'; Mings (yellow card) 90+3'	Report	Agüero 20'; Rodri 30', (yellow card) 60'; Sterling (yellow card) 57'	Stadium: Wembley Stadium; Attendance: 82,145; Referee: Lee Mason

=== UEFA Champions League ===
==== Group stage ====
Manchester City entered the competition in the group stage as the reigning Premier League champions. They were drawn in Group C with Shakhtar Donetsk, Dinamo Zagreb and Atalanta.

Pos	Team	Pld	W	D	L	GF	GA	GD	Pts	Qualification	MCI	ATA	SHK	DZG
1	(England) Manchester City	6	4	2	0	16	4	+12	14	Advance to knockout phase	—	5–1	1–1	2–0
2	(Italy) Atalanta	6	2	1	3	8	12	−4	7	Advance to knockout phase	1–1	—	1–2	2–0
3	(Ukraine) Shakhtar Donetsk	6	1	3	2	8	13	−5	6	Transfer to Europa League	0–3	0–3	—	2–2
4	(Croatia) Dinamo Zagreb	6	1	2	3	10	13	−3	5		1–4	4–0	3–3	—

Source: UEFA
Rules for classification: Group stage tiebreakers

18 September 2019 1	Shakhtar Donetsk (Ukraine)	0–3	(England) Manchester City	Kharkiv, Ukraine
20:00 BST		Report	Mahrez 24'; Rodri (yellow card) 29'; Gündoğan 38'; Gabriel Jesus 76'	Stadium: Metalist Stadium; Attendance: 36,675; Referee: Artur Soares Dias (Portugal)

1 October 2019 2	Manchester City (England)	2–0	(Croatia) Dinamo Zagreb	Manchester, England
20:00 BST	Cancelo (yellow card) 19'; Sterling 66'; Fernandinho (yellow card) 90+4'; Foden 90+5'	Report	Perić (yellow card) 69'	Stadium: City of Manchester Stadium; Attendance: 49,046; Referee: Serdar Gözübüyük (Netherlands)

22 October 2019 3	Manchester City (England)	5–1	(Italy) Atalanta	Manchester, England
20:00 BST	Mendy (yellow card) 4'; Agüero 34', 38' (pen.); Sterling 58', 64', 69'; De Bruyne (yellow card) 63'; Foden (yellow card) 76' (yellow-red card) 83'; Otamendi (yellow card) 90+2'	Report	Masiello (yellow card) 10'; Malinovskyi 28' (pen.)	Stadium: City of Manchester Stadium; Attendance: 49,308; Referee: Orel Grinfeld (Israel)

6 November 2019 4	Atalanta (Italy)	1–1	(England) Manchester City	Milan, Italy
20:00 GMT	Djimsiti (yellow card) 27'; Toloi (yellow card) 41'; Iličić (yellow card) 42'; Pašalić 49'; Castagne (yellow card) 79'	Report	Sterling 7'; Gabriel Jesus (penalty missed) 43'; Fernandinho (yellow card) 70'; Bravo (red card) 81'; Mendy (yellow card) 90+2'; B. Silva (yellow card) 90+6'	Stadium: San Siro; Attendance: 34,326; Referee: Aleksei Kulbakov (Belarus)
Note: The match was played at the San Siro in Milan, instead of Atalanta's regular home stadium, the Stadio Atleti Azzurri d'Italia in Bergamo, due to ongoing renovation.

26 November 2019 5	Manchester City (England)	1–1	(Ukraine) Shakhtar Donetsk	Manchester, England
20:00 GMT	Gündoğan 56'; Fernandinho (yellow card) 90+1'	Report	Solomon 69'	Stadium: City of Manchester Stadium; Attendance: 52,020; Referee: Slavko Vinčić (Slovenia)

11 December 2019 6	Dinamo Zagreb (Croatia)	1–4	(England) Manchester City	Zagreb, Croatia
17:55 GMT; 18:55 CET	Olmo 10'; Ademi (yellow card) 34'	Report	Gabriel Jesus 34', 50', 54'; Foden 84'	Stadium: Stadion Maksimir; Attendance: 29,385; Referee: Carlos del Cerro Grande (Spain)

==== Knockout phase ====
The draw for the round of 16 was held on 16 December 2019.

===== Round of 16 =====
26 February 2020 First leg	Real Madrid (Spain)	1–2	(England) Manchester City	Madrid, Spain
21:00 CET	Valverde (yellow card) 48'; Modrić (yellow card) 54'; Isco 60'; Ramos (red card) 86'	Report	Mendy (yellow card) 29'; Gabriel Jesus 78'; De Bruyne 83' (pen.)	Stadium: Santiago Bernabéu; Attendance: 75,615; Referee: Daniele Orsato (Italy)

7 August 2020 Second leg	Manchester City (England)	2–1 (4–2 agg.)	(Spain) Real Madrid	Manchester, England
20:00 BST	Sterling 9'; Gabriel Jesus 68'	Report	Benzema 28'; Modrić (yellow card) 81'	Stadium: City of Manchester Stadium; Attendance: 0 Referee: Felix Brych (Germany)
Note: The match, originally scheduled to be played on 17 March, 21:00 CET (20:00 GMT) at the City of Manchester Stadium, was indefinitely postponed as Real Madrid players were quarantined due to the COVID-19 pandemic in Spain. On 17 June, it was rescheduled to 7 August.

===== Quarter-finals =====
15 August 2020 Quarter-finals	Manchester City (England)	1–3	(France) Lyon	Lisbon, Portugal
21:00 CEST	Fernandinho (yellow card) 29'; Rodri (yellow card) 58'; De Bruyne 69'	Report	Dubois (yellow card) 12'; Cornet 24'; Marcelo (yellow card) 65'; Dembélé 79', 87'	Stadium: Estádio José Alvalade; Attendance: 0 Referee: Danny Makkelie (Netherlands)

== Players ==
N	Pos.	Nat.	Name	Age	Since	App	Goals	Ends	Transfer fee	Notes
1	GK	(Chile)	Claudio Bravo	37	2016	61	0	2020	£15.4m	Second nationality: Spain
2	DF	(England)	Kyle Walker	30	2017	142	3	2024	£45m	
5	DF	(England)	John Stones	26	2016	133	5	2022	£47.5m	
7	FW	(England)	Raheem Sterling	25	2015	243	100	2023	£44m	
8	MF	(Germany)	İlkay Gündoğan	29	2016	164	22	2023	£20m	
9	FW	(Brazil)	Gabriel Jesus	23	2017	153	68	2023	£27m	
10	FW	(Argentina)	Sergio Agüero	32	2011	370	254	2021	£31.5m	All time top goalscorer
11	MF	(Ukraine)	Oleksandr Zinchenko	23	2016	68	2	2024	£1.7m	
14	DF	(France)	Aymeric Laporte	26	2018	84	6	2025	£57m	
16	MF	(Spain)	Rodri	24	2019	52	4	2025	£62.8m	Record signing
17	MF	(Belgium)	Kevin De Bruyne	29	2015	222	57	2023	£54.5m	2nd vice-captain
19	FW	(Germany)	Leroy Sané	24	2016	135	39	2021	£37m	
20	MF	(Portugal)	Bernardo Silva	26	2017	156	30	2025	£43.5m	
21	MF	(Spain)	David Silva	34	2010	436	77	2020	£24m	Captain
22	DF	(France)	Benjamin Mendy	26	2017	53	0	2022	£52m	
25	MF	(Brazil)	Fernandinho	35	2013	314	23	2021	£30m	1st vice-captain
26	FW	(Algeria)	Riyad Mahrez	29	2018	94	25	2023	£60m	
27	DF	(Portugal)	João Cancelo	26	2019	33	1	2025	£60m	
30	DF	(Argentina)	Nicolás Otamendi	32	2015	210	11	2022	£28m	
31	GK	(Brazil)	Ederson	26	2017	144	0	2025	£34.9m	Second nationality: Portugal
33	GK	(England)	Scott Carson	34	2019	0	0	2020	Loan	On loan from Derby County
47	MF	(England)	Phil Foden	20	2017	74	15	2024	Youth system	Academy graduate
50	DF	(Spain)	Eric Garcia	19	2018	23	0	2022	£1.45m	Academy graduate
69	MF	(England)	Tommy Doyle	18	2019	3	0	2021	Youth system	Academy graduate
78	DF	(England)	Taylor Harwood-Bellis	18	2019	4	1	2021	Youth system	Academy graduate

== Transfers and loans ==
=== Transfers in ===
Date	Position	No.	Player	From	Fee	Team	Ref.
1 July 2019	DF	—	(Spain) Oscar Tarensi	(Spain) Espanyol	Undisclosed	Academy	
1 July 2019	CF	—	(England) Daniel Ogwuru	Bolton Wanderers	£100,000	Academy	
3 July 2019	DF	12	(Spain) Angeliño	(Netherlands) PSV Eindhoven	£5,350,000	First team	
4 July 2019	MF	16	(Spain) Rodri	(Spain) Atlético Madrid	£62,800,000	First team	
7 July 2019	MF	–	(England) Samuel Edozie	Millwall	Undisclosed	Academy	
9 July 2019	FW	72	(England) Morgan Rogers	West Bromwich Albion	£4,000,000	Academy	
9 July 2019	GK	–	(United States) Zack Steffen	(United States) Columbus Crew	£7,000,000	First team	
12 July 2019	MF	–	(Norway) Oscar Bobb	(Norway) Vålerenga	Undisclosed	Academy	
14 July 2019	FW	–	(England) Liam Delap	Derby County	Undisclosed	Academy	
1 August 2019	FW	–	(England) Josh Wilson-Esbrand	West Ham United	Undisclosed	Academy	
6 August 2019	MF	–	(England) Kane Taylor	Aston Villa	£129,000	Academy	
7 August 2019	RB	27	(Portugal) João Cancelo	(Italy) Juventus	£60,000,000	First team	
7 August 2019	RW	—	(Portugal) Félix Correia	(Portugal) Sporting CP	£3,200,000	Academy	
7 August 2019	RB	—	(Spain) Pedro Porro	(Spain) Girona	Undisclosed	Academy	
8 August 2019	MF	—	(Japan) Ryotaro Meshino	(Japan) Gamba Osaka	Undisclosed	Academy	
1 January 2020	FW	–	(Serbia) Slobodan Tedić	(Serbia) FK Cukaricki Beograd	Undisclosed	Academy	
9 January 2020	MF	–	(Scotland) Liam Smith	(Scotland) Kilmarnock	£250,000	Academy	
15 January 2020	DF	–	(England) Camron Gbadebo	Leicester City	Compensation	Academy	

=== Transfers out ===
Date	Position	No.	Player	To	Fee	Team	Ref.
1 July 2019	MF	–	(Australia) Luke Brattan	(Australia) Sydney FC	Free transfer	Academy	
1 July 2019	MF	72	(Nigeria) Tom Dele-Bashiru	Watford	Free transfer	Academy	
1 July 2019	DF	77	(England) Cameron Humphreys	(Belgium) Zulte Waregem	Free transfer	Academy	
1 July 2019	DF	4	(Belgium) Vincent Kompany	(Belgium) Anderlecht	Free transfer	First team	
1 July 2019	MF	57	(France) Aaron Nemane	Torquay United	Free transfer	Academy	
1 July 2019	DF	58	(England) Charlie Oliver	Southport	Free transfer	Academy	
1 July 2019	GK	–	(England) Lewis Thomas	Burnley	Undisclosed	Academy	
3 July 2019	CF	–	(Nigeria) Osazee Aghatise	Derby County	Undisclosed	Academy	
4 July 2019	MF	–	(Australia) Anthony Caceres	(Australia) Sydney FC	Undisclosed	Academy	
10 July 2019	CF	–	(England) Sam Bellis	Southampton	Undisclosed	Academy	
11 July 2019	DF	–	(Spain) Pablo Marí	(Brazil) Flamengo	£1,700,000	Academy	
12 July 2019	MF	–	(Wales) Owen Hesketh	Wolverhampton Wanderers	Undisclosed	Academy	
15 July 2019	MF	18	(England) Fabian Delph	Everton	£10,000,000	First team	
16 July 2019	CF	–	(Netherlands) Noah Ohio	(Germany) RB Leipzig	Free transfer	Academy	
16 July 2019	MF	–	(England) Tom Midgley	Newcastle United	Free transfer	Academy	
18 July 2019	MF	89	(England) Taylor Richards	Brighton & Hove Albion	£2,500,000	Academy	
19 July 2019	MF	76	(Spain) Manu García	(Spain) Sporting Gijón	£4,000,000	Academy	
25 July 2019	MF	39	(Brazil) Douglas Luiz	Aston Villa	£15,000,000	Academy	
7 August 2019	RB	3	(Brazil) Danilo	(Italy) Juventus	£34,100,000	First team	
9 August 2019	MF	62	(England) Brandon Barker	(Scotland) Rangers	Undisclosed	Academy	
12 August 2019	CB	15	(France) Eliaquim Mangala	(Spain) Valencia	Free transfer	First team	
16 August 2019	DF	85	(Norway) Colin Rösler	(Netherlands) NAC Breda	Undisclosed	Academy	
2 September 2019	DF	71	(Netherlands) Jeremie Frimpong	(Scotland) Celtic	Undisclosed	Academy	
2 September 2019	CF	80	(Switzerland) Lorenzo González	(Spain) Málaga	Undisclosed	Academy	
28 November 2019	MF	—	(Mexico) Uriel Antuna	(Mexico) Guadalajara	Undisclosed	Academy	
24 January 2020	RW	83	(England) Ian Poveda	Leeds United	Undisclosed	First team	
27 January 2020	MF	59	(England) Henri Ogunby	Burnley	Undisclosed	Academy	

=== Loans in ===
Date	Loan ends	Position	No.	Player	From	Team	Ref.
8 August 2019	15 August 2020 (Note: This loan, planned to end on 30 June, was extended due to the extension of the relevant season amidst the COVID-19 pandemic.)	GK	33	(England) Scott Carson	Derby County	First team	

=== Loans out ===
Date	Loan ends	Position	No.	Player	To	Team	Ref.
17 August 2018	30 June 2020	MF	—	(Australia) Daniel Arzani	(Scotland) Celtic	Academy	
14 January 2019	30 June 2020	DF	—	(Japan) Ko Itakura	(Netherlands) Groningen	Academy	
29 January 2019	28 November 2019 (Note: Uriel Antuna's planned year long loan to LA Galaxy was ended on 28 November when he was transferred to C.D. Guadalajara.)	MF	—	(Mexico) Uriel Antuna	(United States) LA Galaxy	Academy	
1 July 2019	2 January 2020 (Note: Patrick Roberts' planned season-long loan to Norwich was ended on 2 January when he was loaned to Middlesbrough.)	MF	27	(England) Patrick Roberts	Norwich City	First team	
1 July 2019	22 July 2020	MF	38	(England) Jack Harrison	Leeds United	Academy	
1 July 2019	31 January 2020	MF	65	(Wales) Matthew Smith	Queens Park Rangers	Academy	
3 July 2019	30 June 2020	FW	68	(France) Thierry Ambrose	(France) Metz	Academy	
3 July 2019	30 June 2020	MF	—	(Croatia) Ante Palaversa	(Belgium) Oostende	Academy	
9 July 2019	30 June 2020	GK	49	(Kosovo) Arijanet Muric	Nottingham Forest	First team	
9 July 2019	30 June 2020	GK	—	(United States) Zack Steffen	(Germany) Fortuna Düsseldorf	First team	
17 July 2019	1 August 2020	MF	67	(Spain) Paolo Fernandes	(Italy) Perugia	Academy	
17 July 2019	30 June 2020	DF	34	(Netherlands) Philippe Sandler	(Belgium) Anderlecht	First Team	
19 July 2019	31 December 2019	MF	—	(United States) Mix Diskerud	(South Korea) Ulsan Hyundai	Academy	
26 July 2019	30 June 2020	MF	—	(Venezuela) Yangel Herrera	(Spain) Granada	Academy	
31 July 2019	22 July 2020	DF	24	(England) Tosin Adarabioyo	Blackburn Rovers	Academy	
31 July 2019	26 July 2020	FW	29	(Colombia) Marlos Moreno	(Portugal) Portimonense	Academy	
2 August 2019	30 June 2020	MF	—	(Serbia) Ivan Ilić	(Netherlands) NAC Breda	Academy	
2 August 2019	30 June 2020	MF	—	(Serbia) Luka Ilić	(Netherlands) NAC Breda	Academy	
3 August 2019	3 January 2020 (Note: Lukas Nmecha's planned season-long loan to Wolfsburg was ended on 3 January when he was loaned to Middlesbrough.)	FW	43	(Germany) Lukas Nmecha	(Germany) VfL Wolfsburg	Academy	
5 August 2019	4 July 2020	DF	—	(United States) Erik Palmer-Brown	Austria Wien	Academy	
5 August 2019	30 June 2020	MF	—	(Ghana) Thomas Agyepong	(Belgium) Waasland-Beveren	Academy	
8 August 2019	30 June 2020	MF	74	(England) Luke Bolton	Luton Town	Academy	
8 August 2019	19 July 2020	DF	—	(Spain) Pedro Porro	(Spain) Valladolid	Academy	
14 August 2019	30 June 2020	MF	—	(Ghana) Ernest Agyiri	(Cyprus) Enosis Neon Paralimni	Academy	
22 August 2019	30 June 2020	FW	—	(Portugal) Félix Correia	(Netherlands) AZ	Academy	
30 August 2019	30 June 2020	FW	—	(Japan) Ryotaro Meshino	(Scotland) Heart of Midlothian	Academy	
2 September 2019	30 June 2020	MF	81	(France) Claudio Gomes	(Netherlands) PSV Eindhoven	Academy	
2 September 2019	30 June 2020	MF	75	(Spain) Aleix García	(Belgium) Excel Mouscron	Academy	
2 September 2019	30 June 2020	DF	64	(England) Joel Latibeaudiere	(Netherlands) Twente	Academy	
3 September 2019	30 June 2020	FW	—	(Ghana) Mohammed Aminu	(Netherlands) Dordrecht	Academy	
2 January 2020	22 July 2020	MF	27	(England) Patrick Roberts	Middlesbrough	First team	
3 January 2020	22 July 2020	FW	43	(Germany) Lukas Nmecha	Middlesbrough	Academy	
28 January 2020	30 June 2020	GK	32	(England) Daniel Grimshaw	Hemel Hempstead Town	Academy	
31 January 2020	18 August 2020	DF	12	(Spain) Angeliño	(Germany) RB Leipzig	First team	
31 January 2020	22 July 2020	MF	65	(Wales) Matthew Smith	Charlton Athletic	Academy	

=== Overall transfer activity ===
Expenditure

Total: ▼£133,790,000

Income

Total: ▲£64,600,000

Net totals

Total: ▼£77,979,000

== Statistics ==
=== Squad statistics ===
As of 15 August 2020

Appearances (Apps) numbers are for appearances in competitive games only, including sub appearances.
Red card numbers denote: numbers in parentheses represent red cards overturned for wrongful dismissal.

No.	Nat.	Player	Pos.	Premier League				FA Cup				League Cup				Community Shield				Champions League				Total			
No.	Nat.	Player	Pos.	Apps	Goal	Booked	Sent off (straight red)	Apps	Goal	Booked	Sent off (straight red)	Apps	Goal	Booked	Sent off (straight red)	Apps	Goal	Booked	Sent off (straight red)	Apps	Goal	Booked	Sent off (straight red)	Apps	Goal	Booked	Sent off (straight red)
1	(Chile)	Claudio Bravo	GK	4				4				6				1				2			1	17			1
2	(England)	Kyle Walker	DF	29	1	5		2				4		1		1				6				42	1	6	
5	(England)	John Stones	DF	16				3				3				1				1				24			
7	(England)	Raheem Sterling	MF	33	20	5		4	1			5	3	1		1	1			9	6			52	31	6	
8	(Germany)	İlkay Gündoğan	MF	31	2	7		4	1			5				1				9	2			50	5	7	
9	(Brazil)	Gabriel Jesus	FW	34	14	3		4	2			6	1			1				8	6			53	23	3	
10	(Argentina)	Sergio Agüero	FW	24	16	1		2	2			3	3							3	2			32	23	1	
11	(Ukraine)	Oleksandr Zinchenko	MF	19			1	1	1			2				1				2				25	1		1
12	(Spain)	Angeliño	DF	6		1		2				3								1				12		1	
14	(France)	Aymeric Laporte	DF	15	1	1		2												3				20	1	1	
16	(Spain)	Rodri	MF	35	3	8		4				4	1	3		1				8		2		52	4	12	
17	(Belgium)	Kevin De Bruyne	MF	35	13	3		2	1			3				1		1		7	2	1		48	16	5	
19	(Germany)	Leroy Sané	MF	1												1								2			
20	(Portugal)	Bernardo Silva	MF	35	6	5		3	1			6	1			1				7		1		52	8	6	
21	(Spain)	David Silva	MF	27	6			4				3				1				4				39	6		
22	(France)	Benjamin Mendy	DF	19		3		3				2								6		3		30		6	
25	(Brazil)	Fernandinho	MF	30		7	2	1				2								8		4		41		11	2
26	(Algeria)	Riyad Mahrez	MF	33	11			5		1		5	1							7	1			50	13	1	
27	(Portugal)	João Cancelo	DF	17		3		4				4	1							8		1		33	1	4	
30	(Argentina)	Nicolás Otamendi	DF	24	2	4		3				3	1	1		1				8		1		39	3	6	
31	(Brazil)	Ederson	GK	35		3	1	1												8				44		3	1
33	(England)	Scott Carson	GK																								
47	(England)	Phil Foden	MF	23	5			4	1			5				1				5	2		1	38	8		1
50	(Spain)	Eric García	DF	13		1		2				3								2				20		1	
69	(England)	Tommy Doyle	MF	1				1				1												3			
78	(England)	Taylor Harwood-Bellis	DF					1	1			2								1				4	1		
82	(Spain)	Adrián Bernabé	MF									3												3			
Own goals					2								2												4		
Totals					102	60	4		11	1	0		14	6	0		1	1	0		21	13	2		149	81	6

=== Goalscorers ===
Includes all competitive matches. The list is sorted alphabetically by surname when total goals are equal.

No.	Pos.	Player	Premier League	FA Cup	League Cup	Community Shield	Champions League	TOTAL
7	FW	(England) Raheem Sterling	20	1	3	1	6	31
10	FW	(Argentina) Sergio Agüero	16	2	3	0	2	23
9	FW	(Brazil) Gabriel Jesus	14	2	1	0	6	23
17	MF	(Belgium) Kevin De Bruyne	13	1	0	0	2	16
26	FW	(Algeria) Riyad Mahrez	11	0	1	0	1	13
47	MF	(England) Phil Foden	5	1	0	0	2	8
20	MF	(Portugal) Bernardo Silva	6	1	1	0	0	8
21	MF	(Spain) David Silva	6	0	0	0	0	6
8	MF	(Germany) İlkay Gündoğan	2	1	0	0	2	5
16	MF	(Spain) Rodri	3	0	1	0	0	4
30	DF	(Argentina) Nicolás Otamendi	2	0	1	0	0	3
27	DF	(Portugal) João Cancelo	0	0	1	0	0	1
78	DF	(England) Taylor Harwood-Bellis	0	1	0	0	0	1
14	DF	(France) Aymeric Laporte	1	0	0	0	0	1
2	DF	(England) Kyle Walker	1	0	0	0	0	1
11	MF	(Ukraine) Oleksandr Zinchenko	0	1	0	0	0	1
Own goals			2	0	2	0	0	4
Totals			102	11	14	1	21	149

=== Hat-tricks ===
Player	Against	Result	Date	Competition	Ref
(England) Raheem Sterling	West Ham United	5–0 (A)	10 August 2019	Premier League	
(Portugal) Bernardo Silva	Watford	8–0 (H)	21 September 2019	Premier League	
(England) Raheem Sterling	(Italy) Atalanta	5–1 (H)	22 October 2019	UEFA Champions League	
(Brazil) Gabriel Jesus	(Croatia) Dinamo Zagreb	4–1 (A)	11 December 2019	UEFA Champions League	
(Argentina) Sergio Agüero	Aston Villa	6–1 (A)	12 January 2020	Premier League	
(England) Raheem Sterling	Brighton	5–0 (A)	11 July 2020	Premier League	

(H) – Home; (A) – Away

=== Clean sheets ===
The list is sorted by shirt number when total clean sheets are equal. Numbers in parentheses represent games where both goalkeepers participated and both kept a clean sheet; the number in parentheses is awarded to the goalkeeper who was substituted on, whilst a full clean sheet is awarded to the goalkeeper who was on the field at the start of play.

			Clean sheets					
No.	Player	Games Played	Premier League	FA Cup	League Cup	Community Shield	Champions League	TOTAL
31	(Brazil) Ederson	44	16	0	0	0	2	18
1	(Chile) Claudio Bravo	15 (2)	1	3	1	0	0	5
2	(England) Kyle Walker	0 (1)	0	0	0	0	0	0
Totals			17	3	1	0	2	23

== Awards ==
=== Etihad Player of the Month ===
Month	Player	Ref.
August	(Argentina) Sergio Agüero	
September	(Algeria) Riyad Mahrez	
October	(England) Raheem Sterling	
November	(Belgium) Kevin De Bruyne	
December	(Algeria) Riyad Mahrez	
January	(Argentina) Sergio Agüero	
February	(Belgium) Kevin De Bruyne	

=== Premier League Player of the Month ===
Month	Player	Ref.
January	(Argentina) Sergio Agüero	

Agüero's win in January 2020 was at the time his seventh overall, the most in the competition's history.

=== Premier League Goal of the Month ===
Month	Player	Ref.
November	(Belgium) Kevin De Bruyne	
July	(Belgium) Kevin De Bruyne	

=== PFA Players' Player of the Year ===
Season	Player	Ref.
2019–20	(Belgium) Kevin De Bruyne	

=== Premier League Player of the Season ===
Season	Player	Ref.
2019–20	(Belgium) Kevin De Bruyne	

=== UEFA Men's Midfielder of the Season ===
Season	Player	Ref.
2019–20	(Belgium) Kevin De Bruyne	

=== PFA Team of the Year ===
Season	Position	Player	Ref.
2019–20	MF	(Belgium) Kevin De Bruyne	
2019–20	MF	(Spain) David Silva	

=== Etihad Player of the Season ===
Season	Player	Ref.
2019–20	(Belgium) Kevin De Bruyne	

City's player of the season as voted for by the clubs' fans.

=== UEFA Team of the Year ===
Year	Player	Ref
2019	(Belgium) Kevin De Bruyne	

=== UEFA Champions League Squad of the Season ===
Season	Position	Player	Ref.
2019–20	DF	(Spain) Angeliño (Note: Angeliño played in the group stage for Manchester City and in the knockout phase for RB Leipzig while on loan.)	
2019–20	MF	(Belgium) Kevin De Bruyne	
2019–20	FW	(England) Raheem Sterling	

=== Premier League Golden Glove ===
Season	Player	Clean Sheets	Ref.
2019–20	(Brazil) Ederson	16	

=== Premier League Playmaker of the Season ===
Year	Season	Assists	Ref.
2019–20	(Belgium) Kevin De Bruyne	20	

De Bruyne's total of 20 assists for the season also equalled the Premier League record set by Thierry Henry in 2002–03.
