= 1961–62 Port Vale F.C. season =

Port Vale F.C.
1961–62 season
- Chairman: Joe Machin
- Manager: Norman Low
- Stadium: Vale Park
- Football League Third Division: 12th (45 points)
- FA Cup: Fifth Round (eliminated by Fulham)
- League Cup: First Round (eliminated by Blackpool)
- Top goalscorer: League: Arthur Longbottom (16); All: Bert Llewellyn, Arthur Longbottom (20 each)
- Highest home attendance: 28,226 vs. Sunderland, 31 January 1961
- Lowest home attendance: 4,770 vs. Swindon Town, 14 April 1962
- Average home league attendance: 8,993
- Biggest win: 4–0 (twice)
- Biggest defeat: 1–4 vs. Southend United, 16 October 1961
Home colours

The 1961–62 season was Port Vale's 50th season of football in the English Football League, and their third season in the Third Division, under manager Norman Low and chairman Joe Machin. After an opening described by local media as "gloom has descended" — Vale regrouped with several key signings, including Arthur Longbottom, Stan Steele, John Nicholson, Colin Grainger, and Ralph Hunt, while offloading Cliff Portwood to Grimsby Town to balance the books. The squad eventually settled into a mid‑table 12th‑place finish with 45 points.

After holding Sunderland to a goalless draw at Roker Park — where goalkeeper Ken Hancock famously thwarted Brian Clough — they won the replay 3–1 at Vale Park in front of one of their highest home attendances (28,226) and were awarded the Sunday Pictorial "Giant‑Killer Cup". Their progress ended in the Fifth Round with a contentious defeat to Fulham, amid disputed refereeing decisions. In the League Cup, Vale were knocked out in the First Round by Blackpool.

Leading scorers Arthur Longbottom and Bert Llewellyn netted 20 goals each across all competitions. At Vale Park, average attendance stood at approximately 8,993, with a low of 4,770 (versus Swindon) and a standout high of 28,226 for the Sunderland cup tie. Off‑field developments included the opening of an £8,000 social club at Vale Park, aimed at expanding the stadium's community appeal and family focus.

== Overview ==
=== Third Division ===
The pre-season saw Norman Low spend some of the £10,000 in transfer funds he was allocated. He spent £2,000 acquiring inside-forward Arthur Longbottom from Queens Park Rangers. Low then repaid West Bromwich Albion the £10,000 for Stan Steele to bring him back to Vale Park. This meant a 'shock' for the fans, as Cliff Portwood was sold to Grimsby Town for £6,000 to balance the books. Another £2,000 was spent on bringing centre-half John Nicholson from Liverpool. Free signings included winger Stan Edwards (Everton), goalkeeper Peter Taylor (Middlesbrough), and Joe Maloney (Shrewsbury Town). Low declared that the logic behind the signings was to improve the defence and that his side was now 'capable of getting promotion'. To whip the new signings into shape trainer Lol Hamlett took them on a seven-mile run.

The defence began poorly in an opening day 4–2 defeat to Shrewsbury Town at Gay Meadow, whilst the referee also made an error initially blowing up for half-time after just 32 minutes. Maloney was subsequently dropped and sold to Crewe Alexandra for 'a small fee'. The first match at Burslem saw Vale "casually steamroller" Hull City 4–0. On 2 September, John Nicholson made the first of his club record 208 consecutive appearances, that would end on 8 September 1965. On a four-match sequence without a win, The Sentinel commented that "gloom has descended". The mood lifted with a 1–0 win over Bristol City at Ashton Gate on 9 September, in the first of five wins in six games.

On 2 October Czechoslovakia beat Vale 3–1 in front of 22,895 fans at Vale Park, repaying the club for their successful tour of the country at the end of the 1959–60 season. Two days later, Terry Miles had a stone thrown at him in a goalless draw at fourth-placed Reading. Later that month, Dennis Fidler was sold to Grimsby Town for £2,000, and the "Valiants" struggled, losing 4–1 at Southend United on 16 October. Vale then signed Colin Grainger from Leeds United for £6,000, and the former England international scored on his debut in a 4–1 victory over Torquay United. In December, Low further added to his firepower by signing Ralph Hunt from Swindon Town for £3,500. Hunt scored a hat-trick in his second game for the club, a 4–1 win over Shrewsbury Town on 16 December. He also hit the back of the net in the following two victories, including a brace in a 3–1 win at Peterborough United on 23 December. Vale then struggled in the league, losing four games in a row. Around this time rivals Stoke City faced an upsurge in support with the return of Stanley Matthews. Low attempted to tempt Tom Finney out of retirement, but was unsuccessful.

By the end of February, Vale lay four points clear of relegation, and star player Grainger was injured. Beating Barnsley 2–0, they picked up six points out of a possible ten. A 4–0 home win over Lincoln City on 17 March was much needed. Low made a series of team changes that eventually paid off as the team remained unbeaten throughout the opening six games of April, ensuring survival from relegation. At this time, Noel Kinsey's contract was cancelled, as he wished to go into the pottery business in Norwich. At Vale Park, an £8,000 social club was opened, as the club management stated their intention to turn the ground into 'a real family social centre'. On 23 April, Vale defeated Brentford by three goals to nil, though Steele got into a fistfight with the opposing centre-forward George Francis.

They finished the season in 12th position with 45 points, closer to the drop zone than the promotion zone. A weak attack did not support a strong defence. Llewellyn and Longbottom scored twenty goals each in all competitions but received little support.

=== Finances ===
On the financial side, declining attendance failed to prevent a profit of £1,261. This profit came thanks to a hefty £16,250 donation from the Sportsmen's Association and Vale's daily pools. Gate receipts stood at £44,388, whilst expenditures rose to £73,059 despite wages being kept at around £31,000. Peter Taylor was allowed to leave for Burton Albion as he failed to dislodge Ken Hancock; Taylor later became acquainted with Brian Clough at Burton. Low also sold three players for £2,000 each: Brian Jackson to Peterborough United, Ralph Hunt to Newport County, and David Raine to Doncaster Rovers.

In May, the team took a tour of Poland, playing four friendlies, climbing the Tatra Mountains, and sailing on the Tatras River. When one boat capsized, 'the lads told the attendant in colourful Potteries language what they thought of him'. The final game of the tour was a goalless draw with Legia.

=== Cup competitions ===
In the FA Cup, Vale brushed past Bradford Park Avenue with a "storming 1–0 victory" at Horsfall Stadium. In the second round, they faced Crewe Alexandra, who beat 3–0 in a replay, following a 1–1 draw at Gresty Road. Vale then beat Northampton Town 3–1, all the goals coming from Bert Llewellyn. In the fourth round, they travelled to Sunderland's Roker Park, holding the "Mackems" to a goalless draw in front of 49,468 noisy Sunderland fans - not even £50,000 star striker Brian Clough could master the Vale defence as Hancock made an excellent late save to force a replay. For the return, 28,226 witnessed a 3–1 victory for the Vale over the Second Division side in "a magical piece of soccer history". The Vale were missing Hunt due to him being cup-tied and Steele through suspension, but "spat and hissed like angry alley cats" for their win, intimidating tricky winger Harry Hooper. Hancock went down injured with twisted ankle ligaments in the first minute, though played on and was aided by two pain-killing injections at half-time. Jackson opened the scoring after capitalising on a missed clearance on 37 minutes. Harry Poole celebrated his 27th birthday by scoring from 25 yards (23 m) out shortly after the start of the second half. Longbottom made it three after working an opening on 79 minutes. In the fifth round, they were beaten by First Division Fulham at Craven Cottage with a disputed late penalty. The referee also gave the "Cottagers" a goal kick when the ball had in fact crossed the line for a goal – to the fury of the Vale supporters. The team were awarded the Sunday Pictorial Giant-Killer Cup and the players each given a set of gold cufflinks.

In the League Cup, First Division Blackpool took a 2–1 win at Bloomfield Road to dump Vale out of the competition.

== Results ==
=== Football League Third Division ===
==== League table ====
| Pos | Team | Pld | W | D | L | GF | GA | GAv | Pts |
|---|---|---|---|---|---|---|---|---|---|
| 10 | Hull City | 46 | 20 | 8 | 18 | 67 | 54 | 1.241 | 48 |
| 11 | Bradford (Park Avenue) | 46 | 20 | 7 | 19 | 80 | 78 | 1.026 | 47 |
| 12 | Port Vale | 46 | 17 | 11 | 18 | 65 | 58 | 1.121 | 45 |
| 13 | Notts County | 46 | 17 | 9 | 20 | 67 | 74 | 0.905 | 43 |
| 14 | Coventry City | 46 | 16 | 11 | 19 | 64 | 71 | 0.901 | 43 |

==== Results by matchday ====
| Round | 1 | 2 | 3 | 4 | 5 | 6 | 7 | 8 | 9 | 10 | 11 | 12 | 13 | 14 | 15 | 16 | 17 | 18 | 19 | 20 | 21 | 22 | 23 | 24 | 25 | 26 | 27 | 28 | 29 | 30 | 31 | 32 | 33 | 34 | 35 | 36 | 37 | 38 | 39 | 40 | 41 | 42 | 43 | 44 | 45 | 46 |
|---|---|---|---|---|---|---|---|---|---|---|---|---|---|---|---|---|---|---|---|---|---|---|---|---|---|---|---|---|---|---|---|---|---|---|---|---|---|---|---|---|---|---|---|---|---|---|
| Ground | A | H | H | A | A | H | A | H | A | A | H | H | A | H | H | A | A | H | A | A | H | H | A | H | A | H | H | H | A | H | A | H | A | A | H | H | A | H | A | H | A | A | A | H | H | A |
| Result | L | W | L | L | D | D | W | W | W | D | W | W | D | L | W | L | L | W | D | L | D | L | L | W | W | W | D | L | L | L | L | W | L | D | W | W | L | L | D | D | W | W | D | W | L | L |
| Position | 15 | 10 | 12 | 18 | 17 | 16 | 15 | 13 | 11 | 10 | 6 | 5 | 5 | 6 | 6 | 5 | 5 | 5 | 6 | 10 | 6 | 13 | 13 | 11 | 9 | 9 | 10 | 10 | 12 | 13 | 16 | 12 | 15 | 13 | 13 | 10 | 12 | 14 | 16 | 16 | 12 | 12 | 12 | 10 | 12 | 12 |
| Points | 0 | 2 | 2 | 2 | 3 | 4 | 6 | 8 | 10 | 11 | 13 | 15 | 16 | 16 | 18 | 18 | 18 | 20 | 21 | 21 | 22 | 22 | 22 | 24 | 26 | 28 | 29 | 29 | 29 | 29 | 29 | 31 | 31 | 32 | 34 | 36 | 36 | 36 | 37 | 38 | 40 | 42 | 43 | 45 | 45 | 45 |

Source: Statto
A = Away; H = Home; W = Win; D = Draw; L = Loss

==== Matches ====
| 19 August 1961 1 | Shrewsbury Town | 4–2 | Port Vale | Shrewsbury |
| | | Report | Fidler; Longbottom | Stadium: Gay Meadow; Attendance: 8,632 |

| 21 August 1961 2 | Port Vale | 4–0 | Hull City | Burslem |
| 19:15 BST | Poole; Llewellyn; Jackson | Report | | Stadium: Vale Park; Attendance: 11,480 |

| 26 August 1961 3 | Port Vale | 0–1 | Peterborough United | Burslem |
| | | Report | Smith 53' | Stadium: Vale Park; Attendance: 18,797; Referee: F. Cowen |

| 31 August 1961 4 | Hull City | 3–1 | Port Vale | Kingston upon Hull |
| 19:00 BST | Chilton 2'; Clarke 62'; Crickmore 85' | Report | Longbottom | Stadium: Boothferry Park; Attendance: 8,095 |

| 2 September 1961 5 | Northampton Town | 1–1 | Port Vale | Northampton |
| | Terry | Report | Llewellyn | Stadium: County Cricket Ground; Attendance: 9,573 |

| 4 September 1961 6 | Port Vale | 0–0 | Southend United | Burslem |
| | | Report | | Stadium: Vale Park; Attendance: 10,317 |

| 9 September 1961 7 | Bristol City | 0–1 | Port Vale | Ashton Gate, Bristol |
| | | Report | Poole | Stadium: Ashton Gate; Attendance: 10,670 |

| 16 September 1961 8 | Port Vale | 3–2 | Bradford (Park Avenue) | Burslem |
| | Steele; Llewellyn; Longbottom | Report | | Stadium: Vale Park; Attendance: 9,279 |

| 21 September 1961 9 | Notts County | 2–3 | Port Vale | Nottingham |
| | | Report | Jackson; Llewellyn; Poole | Stadium: Meadow Lane; Attendance: 8,676 |

| 23 September 1961 10 | Grimsby Town | 1–1 | Port Vale | Cleethorpes |
| | | Report | Poole | Stadium: Blundell Park; Attendance: 8,910 |

| 25 September 1961 11 | Port Vale | 1–0 | Notts County | Burslem |
| | Whalley | Report | | Stadium: Vale Park; Attendance: 11,707 |

| 30 September 1961 12 | Port Vale | 2–0 | Coventry City | Burslem |
| | Longbottom; Poole | Report | | Stadium: Vale Park; Attendance: 9,821 |

| 4 October 1961 13 | Reading | 0–0 | Port Vale | Reading, Berkshire |
| | | Report | | Stadium: Elm Park; Attendance: 11,779 |

| 7 October 1961 14 | Port Vale | 1–3 | Watford | Burslem |
| | Steele | Report | Bunce; Fairbrother | Stadium: Vale Park; Attendance: 10,120 |

| 9 October 1961 15 | Port Vale | 2–1 | Reading | Burslem |
| | Steele; Longbottom | Report | | Stadium: Vale Park; Attendance: 7,208 |

| 14 October 1961 16 | Bournemouth & Boscombe Athletic | 1–0 | Port Vale | Bournemouth |
| | | Report | | Stadium: Dean Court; Attendance: 13,675 |

| 16 October 1961 17 | Southend United | 4–1 | Port Vale | Southend-on-Sea |
| | | Report | Nicholson | Stadium: Roots Hall; Attendance: 8,090 |

| 21 October 1961 18 | Port Vale | 4–1 | Torquay United | Burslem |
| | Jackson; Grainger; Llewellyn | Report | | Stadium: Vale Park; Attendance: 10,383 |

| 28 October 1961 19 | Lincoln City | 1–1 | Port Vale | Lincoln |
| | | Report | Llewellyn | Stadium: Sincil Bank; Attendance: 4,708 |

| 11 November 1961 20 | Queens Park Rangers | 2–1 | Port Vale | Shepherd's Bush, West London |
| | Bedford; Angell (pen.) | Report | Llewellyn | Stadium: Loftus Road; Attendance: 7,087 |

| 18 November 1961 21 | Port Vale | 1–1 | Halifax Town | Burslem |
| | Longbottom | Report | | Stadium: Vale Park; Attendance: 9,374 |

| 2 December 1961 22 | Port Vale | 0–1 | Crystal Palace | Burslem |
| | | Report | | Stadium: Vale Park; Attendance: 9,761 |

| 9 December 1961 23 | Portsmouth | 1–0 | Port Vale | Portsmouth |
| | White | Report | | Stadium: Fratton Park; Attendance: 11,925 |

| 16 December 1961 24 | Port Vale | 4–1 | Shrewsbury Town | Burslem |
| | Hunt; Jackson | Report | | Stadium: Vale Park; Attendance: 8,837 |

| 23 December 1961 25 | Peterborough United | 1–3 | Port Vale | Peterborough |
| | Bly 13' | Report | Llewellyn 12'; Hunt 36', 37' | Stadium: London Road Stadium; Attendance: 9,294; Referee: R. Harper |

| 26 December 1961 26 | Port Vale | 3–0 | Newport County | Burslem |
| | Llewellyn; Longbottom; Hunt | Report | | Stadium: Vale Park; Attendance: 12,182 |

| 13 January 1962 27 | Port Vale | 1–1 | Northampton Town | Burslem |
| | Llewellyn | Report | Holton | Stadium: Vale Park; Attendance: 8,229 |

| 20 January 1962 28 | Port Vale | 0–2 | Bristol City | Burslem |
| | | Report | | Stadium: Vale Park; Attendance: 7,262 |

| 3 February 1962 29 | Bradford (Park Avenue) | 2–1 | Port Vale | Bradford |
| | | Report | Sproson | Stadium: Park Avenue; Attendance: 9,294 |

| 10 February 1962 30 | Port Vale | 0–2 | Grimsby Town | Burslem |
| | | Report | | Stadium: Vale Park; Attendance: 10,071 |

| 24 February 1962 31 | Watford | 2–0 | Port Vale | Watford |
| | Crisp; Williams | Report | | Stadium: Vicarage Road; Attendance: 7,778 |

| 5 March 1962 32 | Port Vale | 2–0 | Barnsley | Burslem |
| | Longbottom; Steele | Report | | Stadium: Vale Park; Attendance: 4,958 |

| 10 March 1962 33 | Torquay United | 2–0 | Port Vale | Torquay |
| | | Report | | Stadium: Plainmoor; Attendance: 4,565 |

| 12 March 1962 34 | Newport County | 1–1 | Port Vale | Newport, Wales |
| | Moffat | Report | Longbottom | Stadium: Somerton Park; Attendance: 2,524 |

| 17 March 1962 35 | Port Vale | 4–0 | Lincoln City | Burslem |
| | Steele; Longbottom; Edwards | Report | | Stadium: Vale Park; Attendance: 6,239 |

| 19 March 1962 36 | Port Vale | 1–0 | Bournemouth & Boscombe Athletic | Burslem |
| | Llewellyn | Report | | Stadium: Vale Park; Attendance: 8,993 |

| 24 March 1962 37 | Barnsley | 2–1 | Port Vale | Barnsley |
| | | Report | Longbottom | Stadium: Oakwell; Attendance: 4,670 |

| 31 March 1962 38 | Port Vale | 2–3 | Queens Park Rangers | Burslem |
| | Longbottom | Report | Collins; Bedford; Angell (pen.) | Stadium: Vale Park; Attendance: 4,936 |

| 7 April 1962 39 | Halifax Town | 3–3 | Port Vale | Halifax, West Yorkshire |
| | | Report | Steele; Longbottom; Llewellyn | Stadium: The Shay; Attendance: 2,938 |

| 14 April 1962 40 | Port Vale | 1–1 | Swindon Town | Burslem |
| | Longbottom 71' | Report | Atkins 60' | Stadium: Vale Park; Attendance: 4,770; Referee: U. James |

| 16 April 1962 41 | Coventry City | 0–1 | Port Vale | Coventry |
| | | Report | Edwards | Stadium: Highfield Road; Attendance: 5,907 |

| 20 April 1962 42 | Brentford | 1–2 | Port Vale | Brentford, West London |
| | Brooks (pen.) | Report | (og.); Llewellyn | Stadium: Griffin Park; Attendance: 11,175 |

| 21 April 1962 43 | Crystal Palace | 0–0 | Port Vale | Selhurst, Croydon |
| | | Report | | Stadium: Selhurst Park; Attendance: 10,519 |

| 23 April 1962 44 | Port Vale | 3–0 | Brentford | Burslem |
| | Longbottom; Edwards; Steele | Report | | Stadium: Vale Park; Attendance: 5,928 |

| 28 April 1962 45 | Port Vale | 2–3 | Portsmouth | Burslem |
| | Llewellyn | Report | Saunders; Campbell | Stadium: Vale Park; Attendance: 6,186 |

| 30 April 1962 46 | Swindon Town | 1–0 | Port Vale | Swindon |
| | Jackson 39' | Report | | Stadium: County Ground; Attendance: 7,331; Referee: F.P. Clarke |

=== FA Cup ===
| 4 November 1961 R1 | Bradford (Park Avenue) | 0–1 | Port Vale | Bradford |
| | | Report | Jackson | Stadium: Park Avenue; Attendance: 12,127 |

| 25 November 1961 R2 | Crewe Alexandra | 1–1 | Port Vale | Crewe |
| | | Report | Longbottom | Stadium: Gresty Road; Attendance: 13,081 |

| 27 November 1961 Replay | Port Vale | 3–0 | Crewe Alexandra | Burslem |
| | Longbottom; Llewellyn | Report | | Stadium: Vale Park; Attendance: 19,029 |

| 6 January 1962 R3 | Port Vale | 3–1 | Northampton Town | Burslem |
| | Llewellyn | Report | Moran | Stadium: Vale Park; Attendance: 19,444 |

| 27 January 1962 R4 | Sunderland | 0–0 | Port Vale | Sunderland |
| | | Report | | Stadium: Roker Park; Attendance: 49,468; Referee: Harold Hackney |

| 31 January 1962 Replay | Port Vale | 3–1 | Sunderland | Burslem |
| | Jackson 37'; Poole 49'; Llewellyn 80' | Report | McPheat 87' | Stadium: Vale Park; Attendance: 28,226; Referee: Harold Hackney |

| 17 February 1962 R5 | Fulham | 1–0 | Port Vale | Fulham, West London |
| | | Report | | Stadium: Craven Cottage; Attendance: 29,559 |

=== League Cup ===
| 13 September 1961 R1 | Blackpool | 2–1 | Port Vale | Blackpool |
| | | Report | Llewellyn | Stadium: Bloomfield Road; Attendance: 10,494 |

== Squad statistics ==
=== Appearances and goals ===
Key to positions: GK – Goalkeeper; DF – Defender; MF – Midfielder; FW – Forward

| No. | Pos | Nat | Player | Total | | Third Division | | FA Cup | | League Cup | |
| No. | Pos | Nat | Player | Apps | Goals | Apps | Goals | Apps | Goals | Apps | Goals |
|---|---|---|---|---|---|---|---|---|---|---|---|
| | GK | (England) ENG | John Cooke | 1 | 0 | 1 | 0 | 0 | 0 | 0 | 0 |
| | GK | (England) ENG | Ken Hancock | 52 | 0 | 44 | 0 | 7 | 0 | 1 | 0 |
| | GK | (England) ENG | Peter Taylor | 1 | 0 | 1 | 0 | 0 | 0 | 0 | 0 |
| | DF | (England) ENG | Terry Lowe | 6 | 0 | 6 | 0 | 0 | 0 | 0 | 0 |
| | DF | (England) ENG | David Raine | 12 | 0 | 7 | 0 | 5 | 0 | 0 | 0 |
| | DF | (England) ENG | Roy Sproson | 54 | 1 | 46 | 1 | 7 | 0 | 1 | 0 |
| | DF | (England) ENG | Selwyn Whalley | 48 | 1 | 40 | 1 | 7 | 0 | 1 | 0 |
| | MF | (England) ENG | Colin Corbishley | 8 | 0 | 8 | 0 | 0 | 0 | 0 | 0 |
| | MF | (England) ENG | Stan Edwards | 22 | 3 | 22 | 3 | 0 | 0 | 0 | 0 |
| | MF | (England) ENG | Peter Ford | 14 | 0 | 13 | 0 | 0 | 0 | 1 | 0 |
| | MF | (England) ENG | Roy Gater | 5 | 0 | 3 | 0 | 2 | 0 | 0 | 0 |
| | MF | (England) ENG | Colin Grainger | 18 | 1 | 11 | 1 | 7 | 0 | 0 | 0 |
| | MF | (England) ENG | Brian Jackson | 42 | 7 | 34 | 5 | 7 | 2 | 1 | 0 |
| | MF | (England) ENG | Terry Miles | 52 | 0 | 44 | 0 | 7 | 0 | 1 | 0 |
| | MF | (England) ENG | John Nicholson | 50 | 1 | 42 | 1 | 7 | 0 | 1 | 0 |
| | FW | (England) ENG | Derek Edge | 2 | 0 | 2 | 0 | 0 | 0 | 0 | 0 |
| | FW | (England) ENG | Barry Hancock | 6 | 0 | 5 | 0 | 1 | 0 | 0 | 0 |
| | FW | (England) ENG | Ralph Hunt | 14 | 6 | 14 | 6 | 0 | 0 | 0 | 0 |
| | FW | (England) ENG | Bert Llewellyn | 50 | 20 | 42 | 15 | 7 | 4 | 1 | 1 |
| | FW | (England) ENG | Arthur Longbottom | 49 | 20 | 42 | 16 | 6 | 4 | 1 | 0 |
| | FW | (England) ENG | Harry Poole | 45 | 7 | 39 | 6 | 5 | 1 | 1 | 0 |
| | FW | (England) ENG | Stan Steele | 38 | 8 | 35 | 8 | 2 | 0 | 1 | 0 |
Players who featured but departed the club during the season:
| | MF | (England) ENG | Dennis Fidler | 4 | 1 | 4 | 1 | 0 | 0 | 0 | 0 |
| | MF | (England) ENG | Joe Maloney | 1 | 0 | 1 | 0 | 0 | 0 | 0 | 0 |
| | FW | (Wales) WAL | Noel Kinsey | 0 | 0 | 0 | 0 | 0 | 0 | 0 | 0 |

=== Top scorers ===
| Place | Position | Nation | Name | Third Division | FA Cup | League Cup | Total |
|---|---|---|---|---|---|---|---|
| 1 | FW | England | Arthur Longbottom | 16 | 4 | 0 | 20 |
| – | FW | England | Bert Llewellyn | 15 | 4 | 1 | 20 |
| 3 | FW | England | Stan Steele | 8 | 0 | 0 | 8 |
| 4 | FW | England | Harry Poole | 6 | 1 | 0 | 7 |
| – | MF | England | Brian Jackson | 5 | 2 | 0 | 7 |
| 6 | FW | England | Ralph Hunt | 6 | 0 | 0 | 6 |
| 7 | MF | England | Stan Edwards | 3 | 0 | 0 | 3 |
| 8 | MF | England | Colin Grainger | 1 | 0 | 0 | 1 |
| – | MF | England | John Nicholson | 1 | 0 | 0 | 1 |
| – | DF | England | Selwyn Whalley | 1 | 0 | 0 | 1 |
| – | MF | England | Dennis Fidler | 1 | 0 | 0 | 1 |
| – | DF | England | Roy Sproson | 1 | 0 | 0 | 1 |
| – | – | – | Own goals | 1 | 0 | 0 | 1 |
| | | | TOTALS | 65 | 11 | 1 | 77 |

== Transfers ==
=== Transfers in ===
| Date from | Position | Nationality | Name | From | Fee | Ref. |
|---|---|---|---|---|---|---|
| May 1961 | MF | ENG | Stan Edwards | Everton | Free transfer | |
| May 1961 | FW | ENG | Arthur Longbottom | Queens Park Rangers | £2,000 | |
| June 1961 | MF | ENG | Joe Maloney | Shrewsbury Town | Free transfer | |
| June 1961 | GK | ENG | Peter Taylor | Middlesbrough | £750 | |
| July 1961 | FW | ENG | Stan Steele | West Bromwich Albion | £10,000 | |
| July 1961 | MF | ENG | Colin Grainger | Leeds United | £6,000 | |
| August 1961 | DF | ENG | John Nicholson | Liverpool | £2,000 | |
| December 1961 | FW | ENG | Ralph Hunt | Swindon Town | £3,500 | |

=== Transfers out ===
| Date from | Position | Nationality | Name | To | Fee | Ref. |
|---|---|---|---|---|---|---|
| June 1961 | MF | ENG | Joe Maloney | Crewe Alexandra | 'small' | |
| October 1961 | MF | ENG | Dennis Fidler | Grimsby Town | £2,000 | |
| April 1962 | FW | WAL | Noel Kinsey | | Mutual consent | |
| May 1962 | MF | ENG | Colin Corbishley | Chester | Released | |
| May 1962 | FW | ENG | Derek Edge | Crewe Alexandra | Free transfer | |
| May 1962 | GK | ENG | Peter Taylor | Burton Albion | Free transfer | |
| June 1962 | MF | ENG | Roy Gater | Bournemouth & Boscombe Athletic | 'small' | |
| June 1962 | MF | ENG | Brian Jackson | Peterborough United | £2,000 | |
| July 1962 | FW | ENG | Ralph Hunt | Newport County | £2,000 | |
| July 1962 | DF | ENG | David Raine | Doncaster Rovers | £2,000 | |
| Summer 1962 | FW | ENG | Stan March | Macclesfield | Released | |
