= Jack Grainger =

Jack Grainger may refer to:

- Jack Grainger (footballer, born 1912), English professional footballer
- Jack Grainger (footballer, born 1924), English professional footballer

== See also ==
- John Grainger (disambiguation)
