= Dennis Fidler =

English footballer (1938-2015)

Personal information
- Full name: Dennis John Fidler
- Date of birth: 22 June 1938
- Place of birth: Stockport, England
- Date of death: 2 June 2015 (aged 76)
- Place of death: Italy
- Height: 5 ft 9 in (1.75 m)
- Position: Left winger

Youth career
- Manchester United

Senior career*
| Years | Team | Apps | (Gls) |
| 1956–1959 | Manchester City | 5 | (1) |
| 1960–1961 | Port Vale | 38 | (12) |
| 1961–1962 | Grimsby Town | 9 | (3) |
| 1962–1967 | Halifax Town | 143 | (39) |
| 1967–1968 | Darlington | 34 | (3) |
| 1968–1971 | Macclesfield Town | 91 | (24) |
| 1971–1972 | Altrincham | | |
| 1972–1973 | Macclesfield Town | 37 | (5) |
| Total | | 356 | (87) |
- * Club domestic league appearances and goals

Dennis John Fidler (22 June 1938 – 2 June 2015) was an English footballer. A winger, he scored 59 goals in 229 league appearances in an 11-year career in the Football League.

A two-time FA Youth Cup winner with Manchester United, he turned professional at Manchester City in 1957. He joined Port Vale in May 1960 before being sold to Grimsby Town for £2,000 in October 1961. He was promoted out of the Third Division with the "Mariners" in 1961–62 before joining Halifax Town. He spent five years at the club, playing 143 league games, before transferring to Darlington in 1967. The next year he signed with Macclesfield Town and won the Northern Premier League twice as well as the FA Trophy.

== Career ==
Fidler was born in Stockport in 1938. He played for Manchester United as a youth, but never played first-team football. He played alongside names such as Duncan Edwards, Wilf McGuinness and Bobby Charlton as Jimmy Murphy led the United youth side to two successive FA Youth Cup final victories, beating West Bromwich Albion in 1955 and Chesterfield in 1956.

He signed amateur forms with cross-town rivals Manchester City in 1956 and turned professional at Maine Road the following year. Les McDowall gave him his senior debut in October 1957, as he played outside-forward in a 2–2 draw with Luton Town. Fidler replaced Paddy Fagan, who had been away on international duty. Fagan returned in the next match. Fidler had to wait over a year to receive another opportunity, a four-game run in place of Bobby Johnstone. During this spell he scored his first senior goal in a 4–0 win over Leeds United in a First Division match at Elland Road. In February 1959 he made his final appearance for the club, against Wolverhampton Wanderers.

Fidler joined Norman Low's Port Vale in May 1960. He scored on his debut, in a 3–1 defeat to Bury at Gigg Lane on 27 August. He scored again two days later, in a 4–1 win over Shrewsbury Town at Vale Park. He ended the 1960–61 season with 11 goals in 34 Third Division appearances, and also shot two goals in five FA Cup and League Cup games. He opened the 1961–62 season with a goal in a 4–2 defeat to Shrewsbury Town at Gay Meadow but played just three further games before being dropped in September.

He was sold to Tim Ward's Grimsby Town for £2,000 in October 1961. He scored three goals in nine Third Division games, as the "Mariners" won promotion in second place behind Portsmouth in 1961–62. However, his stay at Blundell Park was brief, and he moved on to Halifax Town. Don McEvoy's "Shaymen" finished bottom of the Third Division in 1962–63, and then finished tenth in the Fourth Division in 1963–64. Under Willie Watson's stewardship, Halifax dropped into the re-election zone in 1964–65 before rising to 15th spot in 1965–66. Alan Ball then took the club to 12th place in 1966–67. Fidler scored 40 goals in 143 league games at The Shay. He then joined Ray Yeoman's Darlington and scored three goals in 34 Fourth Division games in the 1967–68 season. He then departed Feethams and joined Macclesfield Town of the Northern Premier League. Whilst with the "Silkmen", he won the league in 1968–69 and 1969–70, and also won the first ever FA Trophy final at Wembley in 1970 with a 2–0 victory over Telford United.

After retiring from football at Moss Rose, he worked in the family wholesale fish business and emigrated to Italy in 1990. He died in Italy in 2015.

== Career statistics ==
Appearances and goals by club, season and competition
| Club | Season | League | | | FA Cup | | Other | | Total | |
| Club | Season | Division | Apps | Goals | Apps | Goals | Apps | Goals | Apps | Goals |
|---|---|---|---|---|---|---|---|---|---|---|
| Manchester City | 1957–58 | First Division | 1 | 0 | 0 | 0 | 0 | 0 | 1 | 0 |
| Manchester City | 1958–59 | First Division | 4 | 1 | 0 | 0 | 0 | 0 | 4 | 1 |
| Manchester City | Total | | 5 | 1 | 0 | 0 | 0 | 0 | 5 | 1 |
| Port Vale | 1960–61 | Third Division | 34 | 11 | 3 | 1 | 2 | 1 | 39 | 13 |
| Port Vale | 1961–62 | Third Division | 4 | 1 | 0 | 0 | 0 | 0 | 4 | 1 |
| Port Vale | Total | | 38 | 12 | 3 | 1 | 2 | 1 | 43 | 14 |
| Grimsby Town | 1961–62 | Third Division | 9 | 3 | 1 | 0 | 0 | 0 | 10 | 3 |
| Halifax Town | 1962–63 | Third Division | 13 | 2 | 0 | 0 | 0 | 0 | 13 | 2 |
| Halifax Town | 1963–64 | Fourth Division | 38 | 10 | 1 | 0 | 3 | 2 | 42 | 12 |
| Halifax Town | 1964–65 | Fourth Division | 43 | 11 | 2 | 0 | 1 | 0 | 46 | 11 |
| Halifax Town | 1965–66 | Fourth Division | 41 | 13 | 1 | 0 | 1 | 0 | 43 | 13 |
| Halifax Town | 1966–67 | Fourth Division | 8 | 3 | 0 | 0 | 2 | 0 | 10 | 3 |
| Halifax Town | Total | | 143 | 39 | 4 | 0 | 7 | 2 | 154 | 41 |
| Darlington | 1966–67 | Third Division | 23 | 3 | 3 | 1 | 0 | 0 | 26 | 4 |
| Darlington | 1967–68 | Third Division | 11 | 0 | 1 | 0 | 2 | 1 | 14 | 1 |
| Darlington | Total | | 34 | 3 | 4 | 1 | 2 | 1 | 40 | 5 |
| Macclesfield Town | 1968–69 | Northern Premier League | 25 | 10 | 2 | 0 | 15 | 4 | 42 | 14 |
| Macclesfield Town | 1969–70 | Northern Premier League | 25 | 4 | 3 | 0 | 26 | 7 | 54 | 11 |
| Macclesfield Town | 1970–71 | Northern Premier League | 34 | 9 | 1 | 0 | 23 | 10 | 58 | 19 |
| Macclesfield Town | Total | | 84 | 23 | 6 | 0 | 64 | 21 | 154 | 44 |
| Career total | | | 313 | 81 | 18 | 2 | 75 | 25 | 406 | 108 |

== Honours ==
Manchester United

- FA Youth Cup: 1955 & 1956

Grimsby Town

- Football League Third Division second-place promotion: 1961–62

Macclesfield Town

- Northern Premier League: 1968–69 & 1969–70
- FA Trophy: 1970
