= Jim Iley =

English footballer and manager

Personal information
- Full name: James Iley
- Date of birth: 15 December 1935
- Place of birth: South Kirkby, England
- Date of death: 17 November 2018 (aged 82)
- Place of death: Bolton, England
- Position: Left half

Youth career
- Pontefract Collieries

Senior career*
Years	Team	Apps	(Gls)
1953–1957	Sheffield United	99	(7)
1957–1959	Tottenham Hotspur	53	(1)
1959–1962	Nottingham Forest	93	(4)
1962–1969	Newcastle United	232	(15)
1969–1972	Peterborough United	68	(4)
Total		545	(31)

International career
	England U23	1	(0)

Managerial career
- 1969–1972: Peterborough United
- 1973–1978: Barnsley
- 1978: Blackburn Rovers
- 1980–1984: Bury
- 1984–1985: Exeter City
- * Club domestic league appearances and goals

James Iley (15 December 1935 – 17 November 2018) was an English football player and manager. He made nearly 550 appearances in the Football League playing as a left half. He was a brother-in-law to Jack and Colin Grainger.

== Career ==
Born in South Kirkby, Iley played for Pontefract Collieries, Sheffield United, Tottenham Hotspur, Nottingham Forest, Newcastle United and Peterborough United. As manager, he took charge of Peterborough (as player-manager), Barnsley, Blackburn Rovers, Bury and Exeter City. He was capped once for England under-23 team, and twice by the Football League representative side.
