= Edwin Holliday =

English footballer (1939–2021)

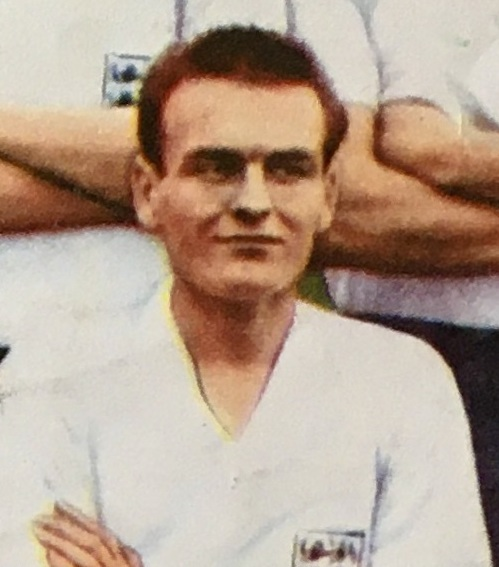
- Holliday with the England national football team at Empire Stadium, London on 28 October 1959.

Personal information
- Full name: Edwin Holliday
- Date of birth: 17 June 1939
- Place of birth: England
- Date of death: 4 October 2021 (aged 82)
- Place of death: Barnsley, England
- Height: 5 ft 9 in (1.75 m)
- Position: Outside left

Youth career
- Middlesbrough

Senior career*
Years	Team	Apps	(Gls)
1956–1962	Middlesbrough	134	(17)
1962–1965	Sheffield Wednesday	55	(12)
1965–1966	Middlesbrough	23	(4)
1966–1968	Hereford United		
1968–1969	Workington	56	(4)
1969–1970	Peterborough United	16	(1)
Total		284	(38)

International career
- England U23
1959	England	3	(0)
- * Club domestic league appearances and goals

Edwin Holliday (17 June 1939 – 4 October 2021) was an English professional footballer who played as an outside left.

== Early and personal life ==
Holliday was born in Leeds, or possibly Barnsley, on 17 June 1939. He married in March 1958.

He was cousins with fellow footballers Colin Grainger, Dennis Grainger and Jack Grainger.

== Club career ==
At club level he played for Middlesbrough, Sheffield Wednesday, Hereford United, Workington and Peterborough United before retiring in 1970 due to injury, having scored 38 goals in 284 Football League appearances. He also played for the Football League representative team on one occasion. He retired following a broken leg.

== International career ==
He earned three caps for the England national team in 1959, and also played for England at under-23 level on five occasions.

== Later life and death ==
Holliday died in hometown Barnsley on 4 October 2021, aged 82.
