= Dennis Grainger =

English footballer

Personal information
- Full name: Dennis Grainger
- Date of birth: 5 March 1920
- Place of birth: Royston, England
- Date of death: 6 June 1986 (aged 66)
- Place of death: Chesterfield, England
- Position: Left winger

Senior career*
Years	Team	Apps	(Gls)
1936–1938	South Kirkby		
1938–1945	Southport	0	(0)
- → Millwall (war guest)
1945–1947	Leeds United	37	(5)
1947–1951	Wrexham	98	(12)
1951–1952	Oldham Athletic	3	(0)
- Bangor City
Total		138	(17)
- * Club domestic league appearances and goals

Dennis Grainger (5 March 1920 – 6 June 1986) was an English professional footballer who played as a left winger.

== Early career ==
Born in Royston, Grainger began his career with South Kirkby before joining Southport on trial in 1937, where his older brother Jack was an established first-team player. After being initially rejected, he re-joined the club on trial in 1938, signing for them as a professional in October 1938. In August 1939 he was given his Football League debut for Southport in a match against Darlington; ironically, his older brother Jack was one of the players who was dropped to accommodate his debut.

== Wartime football ==
During the war he continued to play for Southport when possible, though in 1942 it was evident that his Royal Air Force duties were getting in the way and Southport were forced to look for a replacement. Where possible he combined football with his Royal Air Force commitments and made guest appearances for Millwall, where his form was rewarded with a call up to both the RAF representative football team and the FA XI.

== Post-war career ==
Following the war he transferred to Leeds United in October 1945, for a "substantial" fee, at his own request. When signing for Leeds in October he had already played for the club for most of the season. He signed for Wrexham in November 1947, before moving to Oldham Athletic in June 1951. He finished his career at Bangor City.

== Personal life ==
His brother Jack and cousins Jack and Colin were also professional footballers, while another cousin Edwin Holliday played for England.
