= Roy Gater =

English footballer (1940–2017)

Personal information
- Full name: Roy Gater
- Date of birth: 22 June 1940
- Place of birth: Chesterton, Staffordshire, England
- Date of death: 1 May 2017 (aged 76)
- Place of death: Bournemouth, England
- Position: Half-back

Youth career
- Port Vale

Senior career*
Years	Team	Apps	(Gls)
1960–1962	Port Vale	5	(0)
1962–1968	Bournemouth & Boscombe Athletic	216	(3)
1968–1972	Crewe Alexandra	156	(5)
1972–1974	Weymouth		
1974–197?	Dorchester Town		
197?–197?	Christchurch		
Total		377+	(8+)

Managerial career
- Christchurch
- * Club domestic league appearances and goals

Roy Gater (22 June 1940 – 1 May 2017) was an English footballer who played for Port Vale, Bournemouth & Boscombe Athletic, Crewe Alexandra, Weymouth, Dorchester Town and Christchurch. He made 412 league and cup appearances in a 13-year career in the Football League.

== Career ==
Gater passed through the Port Vale youth team to sign professional forms under Norman Low in April 1960. He made his debut on 4 April 1961, in a 1–1 draw with Coventry City at Highfield Road. He played one further Third Division game in 1960–61, and was also a member of the side that won the Supporters' Clubs' Trophy. He only made three league and two FA Cup appearances at Vale Park during the 1961–62 season. He was sold to Bill McGarry's Bournemouth & Boscombe Athletic for a "small fee" in June 1962. The "Cherries" finished fifth in the Third Division in 1962–63, before new boss Reg Flewin took the club to fourth in 1963–64 and 11th in 1964–65. Freddie Cox then took charge, leading Bournemouth to 18th in 1965–66, 20th in 1966–67, and 12th in 1967–68. In his six years at Dean Court, Gater scored three goals in 216 league appearances. He then transferred to Ernie Tagg's Crewe Alexandra, who would go on to be relegated into the Fourth Division in 1968–69. They finished 15th in 1969–70, before new boss Tom McAnearney took the "Alex" to 15th spot again in 1970–71. The "Railwaymen" then finished bottom of the Football League in 1971–72, before Jimmy Melia failed to lead them out of the re-election zone in 1972–73. In five years at Gresty Road, Gater scored five goals in 156 league games. He moved on to Southern League side Weymouth, Dorchester Town and Christchurch (as player-manager). He later became a coach at Poole Town before returning to Christchurch as manager.

== Career statistics ==
Appearances and goals by club, season and competition
Club	Season	League			FA Cup		League Cup		Total	
Club	Season	Division	Apps	Goals	Apps	Goals	Apps	Goals	Apps	Goals
Port Vale	1960–61	Third Division	2	0	0	0	0	0	2	0
Port Vale	1961–62	Third Division	3	0	2	0	0	0	5	0
Port Vale	Total		5	0	2	0	0	0	7	0
Bournemouth & Boscombe Athletic	1962–63	Third Division	28	0	0	0	0	0	28	0
Bournemouth & Boscombe Athletic	1963–64	Third Division	46	0	1	0	4	0	51	0
Bournemouth & Boscombe Athletic	1964–65	Third Division	30	0	2	0	0	0	32	0
Bournemouth & Boscombe Athletic	1965–66	Third Division	46	0	5	0	2	0	53	0
Bournemouth & Boscombe Athletic	1966–67	Third Division	28	0	0	0	0	0	28	0
Bournemouth & Boscombe Athletic	1967–68	Third Division	22	2	1	0	3	0	26	2
Bournemouth & Boscombe Athletic	1968–69	Third Division	16	1	3	0	0	0	19	1
Bournemouth & Boscombe Athletic	Total		216	3	12	0	9	0	237	3
Crewe Alexandra	1968–69	Third Division	17	1	0	0	0	0	17	1
Crewe Alexandra	1969–70	Fourth Division	42	1	2	0	1	0	45	1
Crewe Alexandra	1970–71	Fourth Division	46	1	3	0	2	0	51	1
Crewe Alexandra	1971–72	Fourth Division	42	2	1	0	2	0	45	2
Crewe Alexandra	1972–73	Fourth Division	9	0	0	0	1	0	10	0
Crewe Alexandra	Total		156	5	6	0	6	0	168	5
Career total			377	8	20	0	15	0	412	8
