= Derek Edge =

English footballer

Personal information
- Full name: Derek Edge
- Date of birth: 14 February 1942
- Place of birth: Baddeley Green, Stoke-on-Trent, England
- Date of death: 23 October 1991 (aged 49)
- Place of death: Stoke-on-Trent, England
- Position: Forward

Youth career
- Stoke City

Senior career*
Years	Team	Apps	(Gls)
1960–1962	Port Vale	2	(0)
1962–1963	Crewe Alexandra	0	(0)
1963–1964	Macclesfield Town	24	(2)
- Stafford Rangers
- * Club domestic league appearances and goals

Derek Edge (14 February 1942 – 23 October 1991) was an English footballer who played in the Football League for Port Vale.

== Career ==
Edge played for Stoke City before joining Potteries derby rivals Port Vale as an amateur before signing as a professional in 1960. After making his debut at Vale Park in a 2–1 win over Reading on 9 October 1961 he also played in the 3–1 defeat to Watford at Vicarage Road on 24 February. These were his only two Third Division appearances of the 1961–62 season for Norman Low. He left on a free transfer in May 1962. He moved on to Crewe Alexandra. He signed with Cheshire County League side Macclesfield Town in March 1963 on a free transfer. The following year, he moved on to Stafford Rangers.

== Career statistics ==
Appearances and goals by club, season and competition
Club	Season	League			FA Cup		Other		Total	
Club	Season	Division	Apps	Goals	Apps	Goals	Apps	Goals	Apps	Goals
Port Vale	1961–62	Third Division	2	0	0	0	0	0	2	0
Crewe Alexandra	1962–63	Fourth Division	0	0	0	0	0	0	0	0
Macclesfield Town	1962–63	Cheshire County League	12	1	0	0	3	0	15	1
Macclesfield Town	1963–64	Cheshire County League	12	1	5	1	4	0	21	2
Macclesfield Town	Total		24	2	5	1	7	0	36	3
