= Jimmy Campbell (footballer, born 1937) =

English footballer

Personal information
- Full name: James Charles Campbell
- Date of birth: 11 April 1937
- Place of birth: St Pancras, London, England
- Date of death: 1994
- Position: Right winger

Senior career*
| Years | Team | Apps | (Gls) |
| – | Maidenhead United | | |
| 1955–1959 | West Bromwich Albion | 31 | (9) |
| 1959–1962 | Portsmouth | 50 | (12) |
| 1962–1964 | Lincoln City | 63 | (16) |
| – | Wellington Town | | |
- * Club domestic league appearances and goals

James Charles Campbell (11 April 1937 – 1994) was an English footballer who scored 37 goals from 144 appearances in the Football League playing on the right wing for West Bromwich Albion, Portsmouth and Lincoln City. He also played non-league football for Maidenhead United and Wellington Town.
