= 2019 Premier League Asia Trophy =

Tournament details
- Host country: China
- Dates: 17 – 20 July
- Teams: 4 (from 1 confederation)
- Venues: 2 (in 2 host cities)

Final positions
- Champions: (England) Wolverhampton Wanderers (1st title)
- Runners-up: (England) Manchester City
- Third place: (England) Newcastle United
- Fourth place: (England) West Ham United

Tournament statistics
- Matches played: 4
- Goals scored: 10 (2.5 per match)
- Top scorer(s): (Portugal) Diogo Jota (England) Raheem Sterling (2 goals each)

The 2019 Premier League Asia Trophy was the ninth edition of the Premier League Asia Trophy. Manchester City, Newcastle United, West Ham United and Wolverhampton Wanderers competed for the Premier League Asia Trophy. It was held in two cities for the first time, Nanjing and Shanghai, from 17 July to 20 July 2019.

Wolverhampton Wanderers won their first title following their 3–2 victory on penalties over Manchester City.

== Results ==
Semi-finals
17 July – Nanjing
(England) Newcastle United	0
(England) Wolverhampton Wanderers	4
17 July – Nanjing
(England) Manchester City	4
(England) West Ham United	1

Final
20 July – Shanghai
(England) Wolverhampton Wanderers (p)	0 (3)
(England) Manchester City	0 (2)
Third place
20 July – Shanghai
(England) Newcastle United	1
(England) West Ham United	0

All kick-off times are local (UTC+08:00)

=== Semi-finals ===
17 July 2019
18:00

Newcastle United (England)	0–4	(England) Wolverhampton Wanderers
	Report	Jota 15', 40'; Gibbs-White 32'; Allan 85' (o.g.)

Nanjing Olympic Sports Centre, Nanjing, China
Referee: Martin Atkinson (England)

17 July 2019
20:30

Manchester City (England)	4–1	(England) West Ham United
D. Silva 33'; Nmecha 36' (pen.); Sterling 59', 72'	Report	Noble 26' (pen.)

Nanjing Olympic Sports Centre, Nanjing, China
Referee: Craig Pawson (England)

=== Third place play-off ===
20 July 2019
17:00

Newcastle United (England)	1–0	(England) West Ham United
Muto 34'	Report

Hongkou Stadium, Shanghai, China
Referee: Guan Xing (China)

=== Final ===
20 July 2019
19:30 CST (UTC+08:00)

Wolverhampton Wanderers (England)	0–0	(England) Manchester City
	Report
Penalties
Coady (penalty missed); Bennett (penalty scored); Kilman (penalty missed); Perry (penalty scored); Vinagre (penalty scored)	3–2	(penalty missed) Gündoğan; (penalty missed) D. Silva; (penalty scored) Danilo; (penalty scored) García; (penalty missed) Nmecha

Hongkou Stadium, Shanghai, China
Referee: Martin Atkinson (England)

Wolverhampton Wanderers	Manchester City

== Goalscorers ==
2 goals

- (Portugal) Diogo Jota
- (England) Raheem Sterling

1 goal

- (England) Morgan Gibbs-White
- (Germany) Lukas Nmecha
- (England) Mark Noble
- (Spain) David Silva
- (Japan) Yoshinori Muto

1 own goal

- (England) Thomas Allan (against Wolverhampton Wanderers)
