= Charlie Crickmore =

English footballer (1942–2018)

Personal information
- Full name: Charles Alfred Crickmore
- Date of birth: 11 February 1942
- Date of death: 11 October 2018 (aged 76)

Senior career*
Years	Team	Apps	(Gls)
1959–1962	Hull City	53	(13)
1962–1966	Bournemouth	128	(17)
1966–1967	Gillingham	53	(13)
1967–1968	Rotherham United	8	(1)
1968–1970	Norwich City	56	(9)
1970–1972	Notts County	59	(11)
Total		357	(64)
- * Club domestic league appearances and goals

Charles Alfred Crickmore (11 February 1942 – 11 October 2018) was an English professional footballer. He played for Hull City, Bournemouth, Rotherham United, Norwich City, Notts County and Gillingham between 1959 and 1972. He won a Football League Fourth Division championship medal in 1970 with Notts County and played in the Gillingham team that gained a surprise draw away to Arsenal in the Football League Cup.
