= Reg Pearce =

English footballer (born 1930)

Personal information
- Full name: Reginald Stanley Pearce
- Date of birth: 12 January 1930
- Place of birth: Liverpool, England
- Height: 5 ft 10 in (1.78 m)
- Position: Wing half

Senior career*
Years	Team	Apps	(Gls)
1953–1954	Winsford United		
1954–1958	Luton Town	75	(5)
1958–1961	Sunderland	61	(4)
1961–1963	Cambridge City	80	(15)
1963–1964	Peterborough United	28	(2)
1964–1966	Cambridge City	47	(5)
- * Club domestic league appearances and goals

Reginald Stanley Pearce (born 12 January 1930) is an English former professional footballer who played as a wing half for Sunderland.
