= Havercroft =

Village in West Yorkshire, England

Coordinates: 53.616764°N 1.402057°W

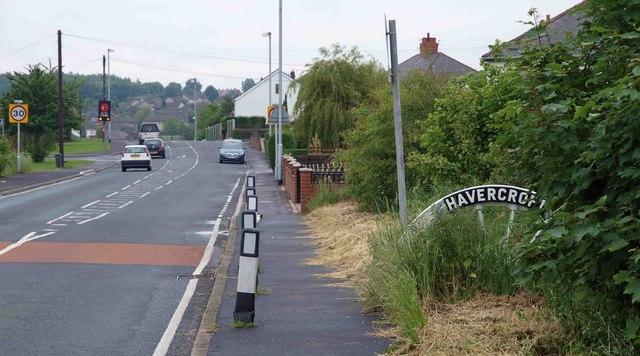
- Entering Havercroft from Fitzwilliam

- Location within West Yorkshire
- Population: 2,256 (2011 census)
- OS grid reference: SE395135
- Civil parish: Havercroft with Cold Hiendley
- Metropolitan borough: City of Wakefield
- Metropolitan county: West Yorkshire
- Region: Yorkshire and the Humber
- Country: England
- Sovereign state: United Kingdom
- Post town: Wakefield
- Postcode district: WF4
- Dialling code: 01226
- Police: West Yorkshire
- Fire: West Yorkshire
- Ambulance: Yorkshire

Havercroft is a small village situated on the B6428 in West Yorkshire, England, approximately 6½ miles north-east of the centre of Barnsley. It forms part of the civil parish of Havercroft with Cold Hiendley, which has a population of 2,103, increasing to 2,256 at the 2011 Census.

Historically Havercroft is part of the West Riding of Yorkshire in the Wapentake of Staincross. The Wapentake almost corresponds with the current Barnsley Metropolitan Area, although a few settlements and townships within the Staincross Wapentake such as Havercroft were put outside the Metropolitan Borough of Barnsley and now lie within the current West Yorkshire Metropolitan Area since April 1974.

In the last 100 years it has grown from a small collection of homes to a thriving village in its own right. For hundreds of years, Havercroft was an agricultural community and the few people who lived here worked in the fields; it does not appear in Domesday Book but it can be traced back on old maps and charters of 1155, when Henry the Second, father of Richard the Lionheart, was King of England. Havercroft now maintains its own school, Havercroft J & I School. The Ryhill & Havercroft Sports Centre is shared with Ryhill as is the local health centre, Rycroft Primary Care Centre. Havercroft also has a 'community hub' known as the Havercroft & Ryhill Community Learning Centre (located in Ryhill) which is also the Havercroft Parish Hall. As well as the Living Hope Community Church established in 1960 at bottom of Cow Lane, which runs a number of community projects. The Havercroft with Cold Hiendley Parish Council meets there and the Centre provides a regular calendar of educational courses & community activities for both Havercroft and its neighbour Ryhill.

Havercroft suffered from high unemployment in the 1980s due to local pit closures. Since then the village has become popular with commuters travelling to nearby towns such as Barnsley, Pontefract and Wakefield.

Havercroft is split into two undistinct sections, Newstead – occupying the higher ground of Newstead hill – and the main village of Havercroft. In terms of the built environment Havercroft is co-terminous with its Ryhill neighbour with the boundary of the two civil parishes following along streetside and garden fence rather than across open fields for much of its length. Cold Hiendley is a hamlet on the west side of the parish, south of Cold Hiendley Reservoir, a small reservoir connected to Wintersett Reservoir.

The parish has a parish council, the lowest tier of local government.
