= 1957–58 Manchester City F.C. season =

English football club season

Manchester City
1957–58 season
- Manager: Les McDowall
- Stadium: Maine Road
- First Division: 5th
- FA Cup: Third Round
- Top goalscorer: League: Joe Hayes (27); All: Joe Hayes (28)
- Highest home attendance: 70,493 vs Manchester United; 28 December 1957
- Lowest home attendance: 20,912 vs Everton; 7 December 1957

The 1957–58 season was Manchester City's 56th season of competitive football and 41st season in the top division of English football. In addition to the First Division, the club competed in the FA Cup.

This season is notable for being the only instance of a top flight club both scoring and conceding 100 goals in a single league season.

== First Division ==
=== League table ===
Pos	Team	Pld	W	D	L	GF	GA	GAv	Pts
3	Tottenham Hotspur	42	21	9	12	93	77	1.208	51
4	West Bromwich Albion	42	18	14	10	92	70	1.314	50
5	Manchester City	42	22	5	15	104	100	1.040	49
6	Burnley	42	21	5	16	80	74	1.081	47
7	Blackpool	42	19	6	17	80	67	1.194	44

Source: World Football
Rules for classification: 1) Points; 2) Goal average; 3) Goals scored

=== Results summary ===
Overall								Home						Away					
Pld	W	D	L	GF	GA	GAv	Pts	W	D	L	GF	GA	Pts	W	D	L	GF	GA	Pts
42	22	5	15	104	100	1.04	49	14	4	3	58	33	32	8	1	12	46	67	17

=== Reports ===
Date	Opponents	H / A	Venue	Result F – A	Scorers	Attendance
28 August 1957	Chelsea	A	Stamford Bridge	3 – 2	Barlow, Hayes, McAdams	43,722
31 August 1957	Manchester United	A	Old Trafford	1 – 4	Barnes	63,103
4 September 1957	Chelsea	H	Maine Road	5 – 2	Barlow (2), Hayes (2), McAdams	27,943
7 September 1957	Nottingham Forest	A	City Ground	1 – 2	Hayes	37,041
11 September 1957	Preston North End	H	Maine Road	2 - 0	Hayes, Fagan	24,439
14 September 1957	Portsmouth	H	Maine Road	2 – 1	Johnstone, Ewing	28,798
18 September 1957	Preston North End	A	Deepdale	1 – 6	Fagan	22,034
21 September 1957	West Bromwich Albion	A	The Hawthorns	2 – 9	Fagan, Clarke	26,222
28 September 1957	Tottenham Hotspur	H	Maine Road	5 – 1	Johnstone (2), Hayes (2), Barlow	22,497
5 October 1957	Birmingham City	A	St Andrews	0 – 4		28,500
9 October 1957	Sheffield Wednesday	H	Maine Road	2 - 0	Barlow, McAdams	24,016
12 October 1957	Leicester City	H	Maine Road	4 – 3	Hayes (2), McAdams, Barlow	29,884
19 October 1957	Blackpool	A	Bloomfield Road	5 – 2	Hayes (2), Barnes, Barlow, McAdams	28,322
26 October 1957	Luton Town	H	Maine Road	2 – 2	McAdams, Barlow	30,633
2 November 1957	Arsenal	A	Highbury	1 – 2	McAdams	43,644
9 November 1957	Bolton Wanderers	H	Maine Road	2 – 1	McAdams, Hayes	34,147
16 November 1957	Leeds United	A	Elland Road	4 – 2	Hayes (2), McAdams, Barnes	23,000
23 November 1957	Wolverhampton Wanderers	H	Maine Road	3 – 4	Barnes (2), McAdams	45,121
30 November 1957	Sunderland	A	Roker Park	1 – 2	McAdams	35,442
7 December 1957	Everton	H	Maine Road	6 – 2	Barnes (3), McAdams (2), Hayes	20,912
14 December 1957	Aston Villa	A	Villa Park	2 – 1	Hayes, (og)	24,000
21 December 1957	Sheffield Wednesday	A	Hillsborough Stadium	5 – 4	Hayes (2), Kirkman (2), Johnstone	23,073
25 December 1957	Burnley	A	Turf Moor	1 – 2	Fagan	27,966
26 December 1957	Burnley	H	Maine Road	4 – 1	Barlow, Kirkman, Hayes, Fagan	47,285
28 December 1957	Manchester United	H	Maine Road	2 – 2	Hayes, Foulkes (og)	70,493
11 January 1958	Nottingham Forest	H	Maine Road	1 – 1	Johnstone	34,837
18 January 1958	Portsmouth	A	Fratton Park	1 – 2	Sambrook	26,254
1 February 1958	West Bromwich Albion	H	Maine Road	4 – 1	McAdams (3), Barlow	38,702
8 February 1958	Tottenham Hotspur	A	White Hart Lane	1 - 5	Hayes	37,539
22 February 1958	Leicester City	A	Filbert Street	4 – 8	Johnstone (2), McAdams, Barnes (pen)	31,017
1 March 1958	Blackpool	H	Maine Road	4 – 3	Barnes, Barlow, McAdams, (og)	30,621
5 March 1958	Birmingham City	H	Maine Road	1 – 1	Barlow	30,565
8 March 1958	Luton Town	A	Kenilworth Road	2 – 1	Sambrook, (og)	16,004
15 March 1958	Arsenal	H	Maine Road	2 – 4	Barlow, Hayes	31,648
22 March 1958	Wolverhampton Wanderers	A	Molineux Stadium	3 – 3	Barlow (2), (og)	34,932
29 March 1958	Leeds United	H	Maine Road	1 – 0	McAdams	21,962
5 April 1958	Bolton Wanderers	A	Burnden Park	2 – 0	Barlow (2)	27,733
7 April 1958	Newcastle United	H	Maine Road	2 – 1	Warhurst, Hayes	33,995
12 April 1958	Sunderland	H	Maine Road	3 – 1	Hayes (2), Hart	31,166
14 April 1958	Newcastle United	A	St James’ Park	1 – 4	Warhurst	53,280
19 April 1958	Everton	A	Goodison Park	5 – 2	Hart (2), Hayes, Sambrook, Barnes	38,000
26 April 1958	Aston Villa	H	Maine Road	1 - 2	Hayes	28,278

== FA Cup ==
=== Reports ===
Date	Round	Opponents	H / A	Venue	Result F – A	Scorers	Attendance
4 January 1958	Third round	West Bromwich Albion	A	The Hawthorns	1 - 5	Hayes	49,669
