= Jack Grainger (footballer, born 1912) =

English footballer

Personal information
- Full name: John Grainger
- Date of birth: 17 July 1912
- Place of birth: Royston, England
- Date of death: 18 January 1976 (aged 63)
- Place of death: Southport, England
- Height: 5 ft 7 1/2 in (1.71 m)
- Position: Full back

Senior career*
| Years | Team | Apps | (Gls) |
- Frickley Colliery
- Royston Athletic
| 1932–1933 | Barnsley | | |
| 1933–1946 | Southport | | |
- → Liverpool (guest)
- Prescot Cables
- Hyde United
- Clitheroe
- Bangor City
- * Club domestic league appearances and goals

John Grainger (17 July 1912 – 18 January 1976) was an English professional footballer who played as a full back.

== Career ==
Born in Royston, Grainger played for Frickley Colliery, Royston Athletic, Barnsley, Southport, Prescot Cables, Hyde United, Clitheroe and Bangor City, as well as playing as a wartime guest for Liverpool.

== Personal life ==
His brother Dennis Grainger and cousins Jack and Colin were also professional footballers.
