= Jack Grainger (footballer, born 1924) =

English footballer

Personal information
- Full name: John Grainger
- Date of birth: 3 April 1924
- Place of birth: Darton, England
- Date of death: 10 January 1983 (aged 58)
- Place of death: Pontefract, England
- Position: Winger

Youth career
- Frickley Colliery

Senior career*
Years	Team	Apps	(Gls)
1947–1957	Rotherham United	352	(112)
1957–1959	Lincoln City	42	(14)
1959	Burton Albion	?	(?)
Total		394	(126)
- * Club domestic league appearances and goals

John Grainger (3 April 1924 – 10 January 1983) was an English professional footballer who played as a winger.

== Career ==
Born in Darton, Grainger began his career at Frickley Colliery before making 394 appearances in the Football League for Rotherham United and Lincoln City between 1947 and 1959.

He later played non-League football for Burton Albion.

== Personal life ==
His brother Colin and cousins Jack, Dennis and Edwin Holliday were also all professional footballers.
