= List of Bury F.C. players (25–99 appearances) =

Appearances and goals are for first-team competitive matches only. Wartime matches are regarded as unofficial and are excluded, as are matches from the abandoned 1939–40 season.

Name	Nationality	Position	Club career	League apps	League goals	Total apps	Total goals	Notes
John Lowe	England	GK	1894–1895	26	0	28	0	
Sam Davies	England	DF	1894–1895	42	5	45	5	
Barney Lee	Scotland	FW	1894–1896	23	11	25	11	
James Henderson	Scotland	FW	1894–1898	87	27	97	32	
Tom Wyllie	Scotland	MF	1895–1897	73	15	81	18	
Tom Pangborn	England	MF	1896–1897	23	1	26	1	
Fred Thompson	England	GK	1896–1902	65	0	75	0	
Jimmy Settle	England	FW	1897–1899	63	28	66	28	
William Brimblecombe	England	MF	1897–1900	57	12	59	12	
Michael Kelly	England	MF	1898–1899	25	7	27	7	
John Berry	England	FW	1898–1903	38	9	40	9	
Tom Gray	England	FW	1902–1903	25	5	27	6	
Hugh Monteith	Scotland	GK	1902–1906	77	0	84	0	
Bob McEwan	Scotland	DF	1903–1904	35	0	38	0	
Herbert Swann	England	FW	1903–1906	40	11	43	12	
Percy Slater	England	DF	1904–1905	28	0	30	0	
Eddie Murphy	England	MF	1905–1906	27	1	29	2	
Amos Kilbourne	England	FW	1905–1907	26	8	28	8	
Fred Bevan	England	FW	1906–1907	31	16	31	16	
Peter Gildea	Scotland	MF	1906–1908	44	4	49	5	
Andy Davidson	Scotland	MF	1906–1908	64	1	69	1	
Frank Booth	England	MF	1907–1909	58	4	61	4	
Johnny McMahon	Scotland	DF	1907–1910	60	0	63	0	
Tommy Rae	Scotland	MF	1907–1911	72	1	74	1	
Harry Pearson	England	MF	1908–1910	31	2	35	3	
Angus McIntosh	England	FW	1908–1910	36	13	39	17	
Dick Parkin	England	DF	1908–1912	71	0	78	0	
Alex Birnie	Scotland	MF	1908–1912	80	2	83	2	
Harold Lee	England	MF	1909–1912	50	4	51	4	
Len Jarvis	England	MF	1909–1912	55	0	59	0	
Billy Lomas	England	FW	1910–1912 1919–1922	67	9	70	10	
Bill Fenner	England	DF	1910–1913	57	0	59	0	
John Brown	Scotland	FW	1911–1914	41	10	43	10	
Wally Smith	England	FW	1911–1914	74	26	80	26	
Tommy Greaves	England	DF	1911–1920	66	0	76	0	
Philip Prior	England	MF	1912–1914	33	0	35	0	
Ted Connor	England	MF	1912–1915	89	4	98	5	
George Brooks	England	MF	1912–1926	71	3	74	3	
William Cameron	Scotland	FW	1913–1914 1919	40	16	44	16	
Joe Smith	England	MF	1913–1915	53	1	59	1	
Jimmy Thomson	Scotland	DF	1913–1915	58	0	61	0	
Alec Mercer	England	FW	1914–1915	29	10	31	10	
Jack Lythgoe	England	FW	1914–1915	38	17	41	18	
Fergie Aitken	Scotland	MF	1919–1921	75	5	78	5	
Jimmy Trotter	England	FW	1919–1922	48	20	50	20	
Billy Ritchie	Scotland	MF	1919–1922	62	15	62	15	
Harry Hird	England	FW	1919–1922	63	19	65	20	
Tommy Cornthwaite	England	GK	1919–1923	90	0	93	0	
Jimmy McCrae	Scotland	MF	1920–1923	84	10	89	11	
Bill Gorman	England	MF	1921–1923	28	1	29	1	
John Callagher	Scotland	DF	1921–1923	60	1	64	1	
Jock Aitken	Scotland	MF	1921–1923	80	8	84	9	
Frank Ward	England	DF	1923–1927	44	0	44	0	
Bill Turner	England	MF	1924–1927	76	0	80	0	
Cyril Matthews	England	MF	1924–1928	67	14	71	16	
Arthur Finney	England	DF	1924–1929	70	1	76	1	
Arthur Gale	England	MF	1926–1929	39	5	42	7	
Jimmy Chambers	Northern Ireland	MF	1926–1930	28	7	31	7	
Harry Dutton	England	MF	1927–1929	37	1	37	1	
David Pratt	Scotland	MF	1927–1929	51	0	57	0	
Martin Davin	Scotland	FW	1927–1930	38	8	40	8	
Bob Pugh	Wales	MF	1929–1930	28	10	30	10	
Harry Hardy	England	GK	1929–1931	27	0	30	0	
Jack Hope	England	FW	1930–1931	34	4	37	5	
George Grass	England	FW	1930–1932	27	7	34	7	
Tommy Mills	England	GK	1931–1933	62	0	66	0	
Duncan Lindsay	Scotland	FW	1931–1934	45	17	49	20	
George Anderson	Scotland	FW	1933–1934	25	10	26	10	
Dan Tremelling	England	GK	1933–1934	57	0	61	0	
Eddie Self	England	MF	1933–1936	32	2	35	2	
Tommy Bagley	England	MF	1933–1937	53	7	57	7	
Sam Earl	England	FW	1934–1936	35	7	38	9	
George Raynor	England	MF	1934–1938	54	4	58	4	
Jack Cope	England	MF	1934–1938	67	2	73	2	
Bill Fairhurst	England	GK	1934–1938	88	0	95	0	
Ernie Matthews	England	FW	1935–1937	73	46	76	48	
Billy Graham	England	FW	1935–1939	81	29	85	30	
Bill Gorman	Republic of Ireland	DF	1936–1938	52	0	54	0	
Alec Ferguson	Scotland	GK	1936–1938	63	0	65	0	
Jack Acquroff	England	FW	1936–1939	56	15	58	16	
Jack Ormandy	England	MF	1936–1939	87	18	92	18	
George Bargh	England	FW	1936–1939	91	13	95	14	
George Davies	England	FW	1937–1938 1946	54	35	61	39	
Bob Hulbert	England	MF	1937–1939	39	15	39	15	
Eddie Quigley	England	FW	1946–1947 1957–1958	52	21	53	21	
Jack Bickerstaffe	England	DF	1946–1948	27	0	28	0	
Don Carter	England	FW	1946–1948	56	27	57	27	
Jimmy Constantine	England	FW	1947–1948	32	14	33	14	
Ken Grieves	Australia	GK	1947–1950	59	0	63	0	
Fred Worthington	England	FW	1947–1951	69	14	71	14	
Dave Massart	England	FW	1947–1951	85	44	89	47	
Johnny Hanlon	England	FW	1948–1950	31	1	33	1	
Johnny Walton	England	FW	1949–1953	55	6	57	6	
Frankie Slynn	England	MF	1950–1952	41	0	42	0	
Jack Hays	England	MF	1951–1952	27	2	28	2	
Jimmy Kirk	Scotland	GK	1951–1954	80	0	84	0	
Johnny Simm	England	MF	1951–1955	47	8	52	9	
Hugh Cameron	Scotland	MF	1952–1953	29	1	29	1	
Stewart Imlach	Scotland	MF	1952–1954	71	14	74	15	
Doug Fletcher	England	FW	1952–1956	67	17	69	18	
Eddie Gleadall	England	MF	1952–1957	74	18	78	19	
Don Wilson	England	DF	1952–1958	62	1	65	1	
Peter Tilley	Northern Ireland	MF	1953–1957	86	12	91	13	
Doug Clarke	England	MF	1954–1955	37	15	37	15	
Bill Redman	England	DF	1954–1955	37	1	37	1	
Cecil Law	Southern Rhodesia	MF	1954–1955	44	5	47	5	
Chris Conway	Scotland	GK	1954–1955	44	0	49	0	
Henry Cockburn	England	MF	1954–1956	36	0	39	0	
Norman Lawson	England	MF	1955–1958	56	8	57	8	
Roy MacLaren	Scotland	GK	1955–1958	86	0	91	0	
Norman Lockhart	Northern Ireland	MF	1956–1958	41	6	43	6	
John Willie Parker	England	FW	1956–1959	82	43	88	46	
Tommy Neill	Scotland	MF	1956–1960	90	8	98	8	
Harry Darbyshire	England	FW	1957–1958	29	12	32	12	
Jim Lovie	Scotland	MF	1957–1960	51	10	55	11	
Ian McIntosh	Scotland	FW	1958–1959	29	14	31	14	
Jimmy Munro	Scotland	MF	1958–1959	41	7	49	7	
Bob Stokoe	England	DF	1960–1964	82	0	92	0	Manager of Bury 1961–1965 & 1977–1978
Frank Beaumont	England	FW	1961–1964	68	12	82	17	
Derek Mayers	England	MF	1962–1963	32	6	36	6	
Jack Threlfall	England	DF	1962–1964	37	1	44	1	
Billy Griffin	England	MF	1962–1966	88	22	98	26	
Ernie Yard	Scotland	MF	1963–1965	45	13	47	13	
Alec Alston	England	FW	1963–1965	85	22	91	22	
Eddie Colquhoun	Scotland	DF	1963–1967	81	2	89	2	
John Bray	England	DF	1965–1966	32	0	33	0	
Jack Maltby	England	FW	1965–1967	57	8	60	8	
Paul Aimson	England	FW	1966–1967	31	11	34	11	
Barry Lowes	England	MF	1966–1967	33	6	36	8	
Alex Dawson	Scotland	FW	1966–1968	50	21	56	21	
Bobby Collins	Scotland	MF	1967–1969	75	6	86	6	
Greg Farrell	Scotland	MF	1967–1969	83	15	93	17	
Paul Hince	England	MF	1968–1970	39	3	40	3	
Alf Arrowsmith	England	FW	1968–1970	48	11	53	12	
Ben Anderson	Scotland	DF	1968–1970	54	6	59	6	
Roy Hughes	England	MF	1968–1971	49	2	49	2	
Ian Towers	England	FW	1968–1971	48	7	52	7	
David Lyon	England	DF	1969–1971	71	0	74	0	
Keith Eccleshare	England	DF	1969–1972	83	0	89	0	
Tony Allen	England	DF	1970–1971	29	0	32	0	
Tommy White	Scotland	FW	1970–1971	48	13	52	15	
Ken Hancock	England	GK	1971–1973	35	0	40	0	
Gareth Williams	Wales	MF	1971–1973	39	4	45	4	
George Heslop	England	DF	1972–1973	38	0	43	1	
Peter Swan	England	DF	1973–1974	35	2	39	2	
Jimmy Nicholson	Northern Ireland	MF	1973–1976	83	0	95	2	
Chris Duffey	England	MF	1974–1975	21	8	28	13	
Hughen Riley	England	MF	1974–1976	51	3	63	5	
George Buchan	Scotland	MF	1974–1976	65	6	72	7	
Ron Phillips	England	MF	1975–1977	72	5	85	8	
Alan Woolfall	England	MF	1975–1978	57	11	68	14	
Gerry Keenan	England	DF	1975–1978	71	3	88	3	
Peter Farrell	England	MF	1976–1978	54	9	60	9	
Alan Suddick	England	MF	1977–1978	34	2	35	2	
Ian Robins	England	FW	1977–1978	49	5	59	10	
Brian Stanton	England	MF	1977–1979	83	13	93	13	
David Gregory	England	FW	1978–1979	52	13	61	23	
John Ritson	England	DF	1978–1980	41	2	53	2	
Ken Beamish	England	FW	1978–1980	49	20	58	22	
Gordon Taylor	England	MF	1978–1980	60	2	72	2	
Ray Lugg	England	MF	1978–1980	71	2	85	3	
Alan Waldron	England	MF	1979–1980	34	0	44	0	
John Waddington	England	DF	1979–1980	47	0	61	1	
Carl Halford	England	MF	1979–1981	31	2	46	3	
Dave Constantine	England	DF	1979–1982	70	2	81	2	
Paul Cruickshank	England	MF	1979–1982	82	4	95	5	
John Farley	England	MF	1980–1981	18	2	27	2	
Neville Southall	Wales	GK	1980–1981	39	0	49	0	
Noel Bradley	England	DF	1980–1982	27	1	31	1	
Mark Hilton	England	MF	1981–1983	32	3	41	4	
Bruce Halliday	England	DF	1982–1983	29	0	29	0	
Franny Firth	England	MF	1982–1983	33	4	35	4	
Stuart Parker	England	FW	1982–1983	34	9	37	9	
Eric Potts	England	MF	1982–1984	51	7	60	7	
Paul Gardner	England	DF	1982–1984	90	0	98	0	
Chris Cutler	England	MF	1982–1985	23	3	29	3	
Gordon Coleman	England	MF	1983–1984	29	0	34	0	
Frank Carrodus	England	MF	1983–1984	34	1	38	1	
Nick Deacy	Wales	FW	1983–1984	31	0	38	0	
Martin Dobson	England	MF	1983–1986	61	4	70	4	Manager of Bury 1984–1989
Gary Buckley	England	MF	1984–1985	31	1	36	2	
Leighton James	Wales	MF	1984–1985	46	5	51	5	
John Kerr	England	FW	1985–1986	31	4	40	6	
Lee Dixon	England	DF	1985–1986	45	6	58	7	
Carl Harris	Wales	MF	1985–1987	38	4	47	4	
Brian Flynn	Wales	MF	1986–1987	19	0	25	1	
Andy Robinson	England	MF	1986–1987	19	0	29	0	
Alan Taylor	England	FW	1986–1988	62	10	78	13	
Ian Fairbrother	England	MF	1987–1988	26	3	27	3	
Nigel Hart	England	DF	1987–1988	45	2	53	2	
Noel Brotherston	Northern Ireland	MF	1987–1988	38	4	54	6	
Mark Higgins	England	DF	1987–1988	68	0	82	0	
Steve Elliott	England	FW	1988–1989	31	11	35	11	
Kenny Clements	England	DF	1988–1990	81	1	97	1	
Chris Withe	England	DF	1989–1990	31	1	37	1	
Andy Feeley	England	DF	1989–1991	57	2	70	2	
Tony Cunningham	Jamaica	FW	1989–1991	58	17	72	22	
Mark Patterson	England	MF	1989–1991 1997–1998	73	12	85	12	
John McGinlay	Scotland	FW	1990–1991	25	9	29	9	
Colin Greenall	England	DF	1990–1992	71	5	84	6	
Ian Wilson	Scotland	MF	1991–1992	23	1	27	1	
Darren Wilson	England	DF	1991–1992	33	1	38	2	
Nigel Smith	England	MF	1991–1992	34	3	41	3	
Lee Anderson	England	DF	1991–1994	29	0	38	0	
Derek Ward	England	DF	1992–1993	28	0	35	0	
Andy Reid	England	DF	1992–1993	33	1	44	1	
Darren Lyons	England	MF	1992–1993	36	7	48	7	
David Adekola	Nigeria	FW	1993–1994	35	12	41	12	
Jimmy Mulligan	Republic of Ireland	FW	1993–1995	20	3	27	3	
Ryan Cross	England	DF	1993–1995	42	0	56	0	
Tony Kelly	England	MF	1993–1995	57	10	68	13	
Lee Bracey	England	GK	1993–1996	67	0	76	0	
John Paskin	South Africa	FW	1994–1996	38	8	48	10	
Trevor Matthewson	England	DF	1994–1996	34	0	49	0	
Phil Stant	England	FW	1994–1996	62	23	74	27	
Shaun Reid	England	MF	1995–1996	21	0	29	0	
Stuart Bimson	England	DF	1995–1996	36	0	44	0	
Adrian Randall	England	MF	1996–1998	34	3	40	3	
Ronnie Jepson	England	FW	1996–1998	47	9	59	12	
Rob Matthews	England	MF	1996–1998	64	11	77	14	
Gordon Armstrong	England	MF	1996–1998	71	4	83	6	
Paul Butler	England	DF	1996–1998	84	4	97	5	
Andy A. Gray	England	MF	1997–1998	21	1	26	4	
Peter Swan	England	DF	1997–1998	37	6	40	6	
Tony Battersby	England	FW	1997–1998	48	8	54	9	
Tony Ellis	England	FW	1997–1999	38	8	42	8	
Matt Barrass	England	DF	1997–2004	84	2	94	2	
Kemajl Avdiu	Sweden	MF	1998–1999	27	1	30	1	
Nigel Jemson	England	FW	1998–1999	29	1	32	1	
Laurent D'Jaffo	Benin	FW	1998–1999	37	8	43	9	
Paul Williams	England	DF	1998–2000	41	1	46	1	
Dean Barrick	England	DF	1998–2000	47	1	57	1	
Paul Barnes	England	FW	1998–2001	54	8	61	8	
Lutel James	England	FW	1998–2001	68	4	78	5	
Baichung Bhutia	India	FW	1999–2001	37	3	46	3	
Darren Bullock	England	MF	1999–2001	53	5	63	9	
Sam Collins	England	DF	1999–2002	82	2	90	2	
Ian Lawson	England	FW	1999–2003	56	18	69	21	
Chris Armstrong	Scotland	DF	2000	33	1	37	1	
Jason Jarrett	England	MF	2000–2002	62	4	70	5	
Nicky Hill	England	DF	2000–2003	22	0	28	0	
Lee Connell	England	DF	2000–2004	58	9	66	9	
Colin Cramb	Scotland	FW	2001 2003	33	8	35	8	
Harpal Singh	England	MF	2001 2003–2004	40	4	45	5	
Jamie Stuart	England	DF	2001–2003	61	1	71	2	
Michael Nelson	England	DF	2001–2003	72	8	84	8	
Paul O'Shaughnessy	England	MF	2001–2004	45	1	51	1	
George Clegg	England	MF	2001–2004	68	9	77	10	
Gareth Seddon	England	FW	2001–2004	79	17	82	18	
Terry Dunfield	Canada	MF	2002–2005	74	5	82	6	
Simon Whaley	England	MF	2002–2006	73	11	85	11	
Joe O'Neill	England	FW	2003–2004	23	3	27	3	
Lee Duxbury	England	MF	2003–2004	37	0	39	0	
Chris Porter	England	FW	2003–2005	71	18	78	20	
Colin Kazim–Richards	Turkey	FW	2004–2005	30	3	32	3	
Neil Edwards	Wales	GK	2005–2006	24	0	26	0	
Matthew Tipton	Wales	FW	2005–2006	24	3	26	3	
Jake Speight	England	FW	2005–2007	30	2	35	2	
Tom Youngs	England	FW	2005–2007	49	7	52	7	
John Fitzgerald	Republic of Ireland	DF	2005–2007	64	3	73	4	
Andy Parrish	England	DF	2005–2008	43	1	51	1	
Kasper Schmeichel	Denmark	GK	2006	29	0	29	0	
Chris Brass	England	DF	2006–2007	29	0	31	0	Manager of Bury 2016–2017
Marc Pugh	England	MF	2006–2007	41	4	47	5	
Andy Mangan	England	FW	2007–2008	20	4	26	4	
Jim Provett	England	GK	2007–2008	32	0	41	0	
Steve Haslam	England	DF	2007–2009	50	1	61	1	
Elliott Bennett	England	DF	2008–2009	65	4	71	4	
Danny Racchi	England	MF	2008–2010	43	0	50	1	
Ryan Cresswell	England	DF	2008–2010	53	1	59	1	
Andy Morrell	England	FW	2008–2010	73	18	79	18	
Wayne Brown	England	GK	2008–2010	76	0	86	0	
Cameron Belford	England	GK	2008–2013	78	0	85	0	
Danny Nardiello	Wales	FW	2009 2013–2015	66	25	72	29	
Tom Newey	England	DF	2009–2010	32	0	36	0	
Kyle Bennett	England	MF	2010–2011	32	2	35	2	
Damien Mozika	France	MF	2010–2011	37	3	41	3	
Tom Lees	England	DF	2010–2011	45	4	50	5	
Andy Haworth	England	MF	2010–2011	46	3	52	3	
Nicky Ajose	England	FW	2010–2011 2013 2017–2018	56	18	65	21	
Phil Picken	England	DF	2010–2012	77	0	85	0	
Peter Sweeney	Scotland	MF	2010–2012	82	5	95	5	
Lenell John–Lewis	England	FW	2010–2013	83	9	93	9	
Giles Coke	England	MF	2011–2012	30	6	30	6	
Andrai Jones	England	DF	2011–2013	22	0	26	0	
Ashley Eastham	England	DF	2011–2013	44	2	46	2	
Mark Carrington	England	MF	2011–2013	48	1	49	1	
Mark Hughes	England	DF	2011–2013	52	0	60	1	
Trevor Carson	Northern Ireland	GK	2011–2013	61	0	67	0	
Shaun Harrad	England	FW	2011–2014	44	2	49	4	
Ethan Ebanks–Landell	England	DF	2012–2013	24	0	26	0	
Zac Thompson	England	MF	2012–2013	29	1	32	2	
Tommy Miller	England	MF	2013–2014	28	0	30	0	
Anton Forrester	England	FW	2013–2014	28	6	31	7	
Andy Procter	England	MF	2013–2014	32	2	37	2	
Brian Jensen	Denmark	GK	2013–2014	36	0	39	0	
Chris Sedgwick	England	MF	2013–2015	58	2	64	3	
Rob Lainton	England	GK	2013–2017	38	0	43	0	
Pablo Mills	England	DF	2014	39	0	44	0	
Jimmy McNulty	Scotland	DF	2014–2015	46	0	51	1	
Danny Rose	England	FW	2014–2016	69	18	80	19	
Hallam Hope	Barbados	FW	2014–2017	66	8	79	11	
Kelvin Etuhu	Nigeria	MF	2014–2017	81	4	91	4	
Leon Clarke	England	FW	2015–2016	32	15	37	18	
Danny Pugh	England	DF	2015–2016	39	0	48	0	
Joe Riley	England	DF	2015–2016	50	2	57	2	
Peter Clarke	England	DF	2015–2016 2018	63	2	68	2	
Reece Brown	England	DF	2015–2017	35	1	42	1	
Jacob Mellis	England	MF	2015–2017	58	3	69	3	
Tom Pope	England	FW	2015–2017	73	10	83	14	
Leon Barnett	England	DF	2016–2017	24	1	26	1	
Ben Williams	England	GK	2016–2017	22	0	28	0	
James Vaughan	England	FW	2016–2017	37	24	40	24	
Zeli Ismail	England	MF	2016–2017	37	3	41	4	
Anthony Kay	England	DF	2016–2017	42	0	47	1	
George Miller	England	FW	2016–2018	48	15	51	16	
Callum Styles	Hungary	MF	2016–2019	41	0	47	0	
Neil Danns	Guyana	MF	2016–2019	77	9	88	9	
Callum Reilly	England	MF	2017–2018	18	0	25	1	
Rohan Ince	Montserrat	MF	2017–2018	22	0	28	0	
Chris Maguire	Scotland	FW	2017–2018	24	2	29	2	
Harry Bunn	England	FW	2017–2018	38	3	43	5	
Phil Edwards	England	DF	2017–2018	37	0	45	0	
Ryan Cooney	England	MF	2017–2019	21	0	29	0	
Eoghan O'Connell	Republic of Ireland	DF	2017–2019	43	2	52	3	
Adam Thompson	Northern Ireland	DF	2017–2019	59	1	70	2	
Jay O'Shea	Republic of Ireland	MF	2017–2019	71	19	80	20	
Joe Murphy	Republic of Ireland	GK	2017–2019	79	0	86	0	
Caolan Lavery	Northern Ireland	FW	2018–2019	23	5	29	6	
Nicky Maynard	England	FW	2018–2019	37	20	41	21	
Will Aimson	England	MF	2018–2019	37	4	43	4	
Chris Stokes	England	DF	2018–2019	37	4	43	4	
Byron Moore	England	MF	2018–2019	36	5	44	8	
Dom Telford	England	FW	2018–2019	38	6	48	14	
Callum McFadzean	Scotland	DF	2018–2019	40	0	49	0	
Kristian Holt	England	MF	2020-2023	61	9	71	9	
Liam MacDevitt	Republic of Ireland	FW	2020-2022	36	3	41	5	
Tom Greaves	England	FW	2020-2022	42	28	51	39	
Aidan Chippendale	England	MF	2020-2023	27	9	34	13	
Jonathan Hunt	England	DF	2020-2023	73	4	85	6	
Jimmy Moore	England	DF	2020-2023	64	6	79	6	
Harry Brazel	England	DF	2021-2023	61	16	79	19	
Jake Kenny	England	DF	2021-2022	62	0	75	0	
Ben Wharton	England	FW	2021-2023	56	22	70	26	
Adam McWilliam	Scotland	MF	2021-2022	25	4	33	6	
Abimbola Obasoto	Nigeria	MF	2021-2022	32	12	39	13	
Daniel O'Brien	England	MF	2021-2022	25	4	33	4	
Chris Rowney	England	MF	2021-2023	75	1	84	2	
Joseph Denman	England	DF	2022-2023	31	6	35	6	
Niall Cummins	England	FW	2022-2023	22	4	30	9	
Sean Higgins	England	MF	2022-2023	24	4	26	5	
Anton Smith	England	MF	2022-2023	47	4	57	7	
Jack Tinning	England	DF	2022-2023	36	0	41	1	
Harry Wright	England	GK	2023–2024	28	0	29	0	
Gareth Peet	England	DF	2023–2025	76	1	88	1	
Oliver Jepson	England	DF	2023–2024	28	4	31	4	
Thomas Moore	England	DF	2023–2024	28	4	31	5	
Andrew Scarisbrick	England	MF	2023–2024	34	7	37	7	
Charlie Doyle	England	MF	2023–2024	34	0	36	0	
Billy Reeves	England	MF	2023–2024	29	2	32	2	
Andrew Briggs	England	FW	2023–2024	44	23	51	24	
Connor Comber	England	FW	2022–2024	68	21	81	30	
Jordan Butterworth	England	MF	2023–2024	22	0	25	0	
Sam Coughlan	England	MF	2024–	24	3	33	4	
Alex Cherera	Zimbabwe	FW	2024–	32	8	40	14	
Bebeto Gomes	Portugal	MF	2024–	81	5	93	7	As of end of 2025-26 season
Lewis Earl	England	DF	2024	25	1	34	1	
Bobby Carroll	England	MF	2024–	67	1	82	1	As of end of 2025-26 season
Iyrwah Gooden	England	FW	2024	17	4	25	5	
Ruben Jerome	England	FW	2024–	40	10	47	13	
Bryan Ly	Republic of Ireland	FW	2024–	41	15	49	16	
Rustam Stepans	Latvia	FW	2024–	74	34	98	36	As of end of 2025-26 season
Connor Pye	England	DF	2024–	64	2	77	4	As of end of 2025-26 season
Josh Gregory	England	MF	2024–	40	4	57	5	As of end of 2025-26 season
Cameron Fogerty	England	MF	2024–	75	6	87	6	As of end of 2025-26 season
Lewis Alessandra	England	FW	2024	19	1	25	3	
Mitch Allen	England	GK	2024–	81	0	93	0	As of end of 2025-26 season
Djavan Pedro	England	FW	2024–	57	33	63	37	As of end of 2025-26 season
Kai Evans	England	FW	2025-	41	16	47	19	As of end of 2025-26 season
Louis Isherwood	England	DF	2025-	36	3	41	3	As of end of 2025-26 season
Oscar Threlkeld	England	MF	2025-	25	3	26	3	As of end of 2025-26 season
James Neild	England	DF	2025-	29	0	30	0	As of end of 2025-26 season
Regan Riley	England	MF	2025-	23	0	27	0	As of end of 2025-26 season
