= 1954–55 Bury F.C. season =

Bury
1954–55 season
- Manager: Dave Russell
- Stadium: Gigg Lane
- First Division: 13th (41 Points)
- FA Cup: Third Round
Home colours

During the 1954–55 season Bury competed in the Football League Second Division where they finished in 13th position with 41 points. In the FA Cup Bury were drawn against fellow Second Division side Stoke City in the third round which went to a fourth replay with Stoke finally winning 3–2 after 9 hours and 22 minutes of football in the longest FA Cup tie between two professional teams.

== Final league table ==
=== Second Division ===
Pos	Team	Pld	W	D	L	GF	GA	GAv	Pts
11	Liverpool	42	16	10	16	92	96	0.958	42
12	Middlesbrough	42	18	6	18	73	82	0.890	42
13	Bury	42	15	11	16	77	72	1.069	41
14	Fulham	42	14	11	17	76	79	0.962	39
15	Nottingham Forest	42	16	7	19	58	62	0.935	39

Rules for classification: 1) Points; 2) Goal average; 3) Goals scored

== Results ==
=== Legend ===
Win	Draw	Loss

=== Football League Second Division ===
21 August 1954 1	Lincoln City	3–2	Bury	Lincoln
	Graver 11'; Finch 32' (pen.); Birch 54'	Report	Pearson 65', 75'	Stadium: Sincil Bank; Attendance: 15,394; Referee: A Holland

24 August 1954 2	Bury	2–1	Luton Town	Bury
	Clarke; Daniel	Report	Turner	Stadium: Gigg Lane; Attendance: 15,545

28 August 1954 3	Bury	1–3	Fulham	Bury
	Clarke	Report	Stevens; Jezzard; Haynes	Stadium: Gigg Lane; Attendance: 18,174; Referee: F Read

1 September 1954 4	Luton Town	3–2	Bury	Luton
	Turner; Mitchell; Adam	Report	Pearson; Kelly	Stadium: Kenilworth Road; Attendance: 13,654; Referee: W Clements

4 September 1954 5	Bury	5–3	Leeds United	Bury
	Kelly; Clarke; Nielson; McIlvenny	Report	McCall; May (o.g.); Charles	Stadium: Gigg Lane; Attendance: 15,357; Referee: G Black

6 September 1954 6	Rotherham United	4–2	Bury	Rotherham
	Burke	Report	Clarke; Daniel	Stadium: Millmoor; Attendance: 15,235; Referee: H Davis

11 September 1954 7	Nottingham Forest	2–3	Bury	Nottingham
	McLaren 20' (pen.); Scott 83'	Report	Law 2'; Clarke 10'; Pearson 85'	Stadium: City Ground; Attendance: 15,603; Referee: A Murdoch

18 September 1954 8	Bury	2–1	Ipswich Town	Bury
	Daniel; Law	Report	Garneys	Stadium: Gigg Lane; Attendance: 15,187; Referee: T Jepson

20 September 1954 9	Bury	2–2	Rotherham United	Bury
	Pearson; Clarke	Report	Williams; Nielson (o.g.)	Stadium: Gigg Lane; Attendance: 11,900

25 September 1954 10	Birmingham City	1–3	Bury	Birmingham
	Lane	Report	Clarke; Fletcher	Stadium: St Andrew's; Attendance: 21,242; Referee: H Beacock

2 October 1954 11	Bury	0–1	Middlesbrough	Bury
		Report	Delapenha 52'	Stadium: Gigg Lane; Attendance: 18,522; Referee: L Richardson

9 October 1954 12	Doncaster Rovers	1–0	Bury	Doncaster
	Brown	Report		Stadium: Belle Vue; Attendance: 15,902; Referee: T Jepson

16 October 1954 13	Bury	2–2	Derby County	Bury
	Kelly; Nielson	Report	Imlach; Dunn	Stadium: Gigg Lane; Attendance: 13,853; Referee: FB Coultas

23 October 1954 14	Liverpool	1–1	Bury	Liverpool
	Anderson	Report	Pearson	Stadium: Anfield; Attendance: 33,310; Referee: G McCabe

30 October 1954 15	Bury	3–1	Bristol Rovers	Bury
	Tilley; Pearson; Kelly	Report	Meyer	Stadium: Gigg Lane; Attendance: 15,343; Referee: HL Broadhurst

6 November 1954 16	Plymouth Argyle	2–4	Bury	Plymouth
	Anderson; Davis	Report	Kelly; Pearson	Stadium: Home Park; Attendance: 15,159; Referee: G Pankhurst

13 November 1954 17	Bury	2–2	Port Vale	Bury
	Law; Kelly	Report	Hayward; Smith	Stadium: Gigg Lane; Attendance: 12,917; Referee: J Mitchell

20 November 1954 18	Swansea Town	1–1	Bury	Swansea
	Medwin 15'	Report	Tilley 88'	Stadium: Vetch Field; Attendance: 19,211; Referee: ER Hill

27 November 1954 19	Bury	1–2	Notts County	Bury
	Kelly	Report	Broadbent; Wylie	Stadium: Gigg Lane; Attendance: 12,495; Referee: PF Power

4 December 1954 20	West Ham United	3–3	Bury	London
	Dick; Musgrove	Report	Kelly	Stadium: Boleyn Ground; Attendance: 18,092; Referee: G Pankhurst

11 December 1954 21	Bury	2–1	Blackburn Rovers	Bury
	Tilley; Pearson	Report	Langton	Stadium: Gigg Lane; Attendance: 24,030; Referee: A Wilkinson

18 December 1954 22	Bury	2–1	Lincoln City	Bury
	Daniel 24', 66', 77'	Report	Munro 61'	Stadium: Gigg Lane; Attendance: 11,761; Referee: A Holland

25 December 1954 23	Stoke City	3–2	Bury	Stoke-on-Trent
	King	Report	Daniel; Pearson	Stadium: Victoria Ground; Attendance: 18,317

27 December 1954 24	Bury	1–1	Stoke City	Bury
	Daniel	Report	King	Stadium: Gigg Lane; Attendance: 24,134

1 January 1955 25	Fulham	0–0	Bury	London
		Report		Stadium: Craven Cottage; Attendance: 17,238; Referee: F Read

15 January 1955 26	Leeds United	1–0	Bury	Leeds
	Lydon	Report		Stadium: Elland Road; Attendance: 8,954; Referee: G Black

5 February 1955 27	Ipswich Town	2–3	Bury	Ipswich
	Garneys (pen.); Nielson (o.g.)	Report	May; Pearson	Stadium: Portman Road; Attendance: 11,395; Referee: T Jepson

12 February 1955 28	Bury	0–1	Birmingham City	Bury
		Report	Brown	Stadium: Gigg Lane; Attendance: 12,547; Referee: K Howley

26 February 1955 29	Bury	1–4	Doncaster Rovers	Bury
	Fletcher	Report	Jeffrey; Tindill; Walker	Stadium: Gigg Lane; Attendance: 11,976; Referee: AW Luty

5 March 1955 30	Derby County	2–3	Bury	Derby
	Pye; Parry	Report	Pearson; Fletcher	Stadium: Baseball Ground; Attendance: 14,379; Referee: FB Coultas

12 March 1955 31	Bury	3–4	Liverpool	Bury
	Pearson; Fletcher	Report	Evans	Stadium: Gigg Lane; Attendance: 16,081; Referee: G McCabe

19 March 1955 32	Bristol Rovers	2–1	Bury	Bristol
	Bradford; Meyer	Report	Clarke	Stadium: Eastville Stadium; Attendance: 17,599; Referee: HL Broadhurst

26 March 1955 33	Bury	3–1	Plymouth Argyle	Bury
	Law; Pearson; Robinson	Report	Davis	Stadium: Gigg Lane; Attendance: 7,348; Referee: AW Smith

2 April 1955 34	Port Vale	1–0	Bury	Stoke-on-Trent
	Griffiths	Report		Stadium: Vale Park; Attendance: 14,228; Referee: J Mitchell

8 April 1955 35	Bury	4–1	Hull City	Bury
	Clarke 2', 25', 36'; Kelly 88'	Report	Crosbie	Stadium: Gigg Lane; Attendance: 11,381

9 April 1955 36	Bury	2–1	Swansea Town	Bury
	Kelly; Pearson	Report	Charles 13'	Stadium: Gigg Lane; Attendance: 12,284

11 April 1955 37	Hull City	1–0	Bury	Hull
	Gerrie 20'	Report		Stadium: Boothferry Park; Attendance: 13,701

16 April 1955 38	Notts County	2–1	Bury	Nottingham
	Jackson; Redman (o.g.)	Report	Clarke	Stadium: Meadow Lane; Attendance: 12,545; Referee: PF Power

20 April 1955 39	Bury	1–1	Nottingham Forest	Bury
	Kelly	Report	Blackman	Stadium: Gigg Lane; Attendance: 8,067; Referee: A Murdoch

23 April 1955 40	Bury	4–1	West Ham United	Bury
	Fletcher; Pearson; Robinson; Kelly	Report	Dick	Stadium: Gigg Lane; Attendance: 8,746

27 April 1955 41	Middlesbrough	1–1	Bury	Middlesbrough
	McPherson	Report	Fletcher	Stadium: Ayresome Park; Attendance: 7,944

30 April 1955 42	Blackburn Rovers	1–1	Bury	Blackburn
	Quigley	Report	Law	Stadium: Ewood Park; Attendance: 17,469

=== FA Cup ===
8 January 1955 Round 3	Bury	1–1	Stoke City	Bury
	Daniel	Report	King	Stadium: Gigg Lane; Attendance: 20,227; Referee: JG Williams

12 January 1955 Replay	Stoke City	1–1	Bury	Stoke
	Ratcliffe 7'	Report	Daniel 79'	Stadium: Victoria Ground; Attendance: 13,352

17 January 1955 2nd Replay	Bury	3–3 (a.e.t.)	Stoke City	Liverpool
	Pearson; Simm; Tilley	Report	King; Bowyer	Stadium: Goodison Park; Attendance: 2,469; Referee: JG Williams

19 January 1955 3rd Replay	Stoke City	2–2 (a.e.t.)	Bury	Liverpool
	King; Ratcliffe	Report	Daniel; Kelly	Stadium: Anfield; Attendance: 9,881; Referee: JG Williams

24 January 1955 4th Replay	Stoke City	3–2 (a.e.t.)	Bury	Manchester
	Thomson; Coleman	Report	Daniel	Stadium: Old Trafford; Attendance: 22,549; Referee: JG Williams

== Squad ==
Note: Flags indicate national team as defined under FIFA eligibility rules; some limited exceptions apply. Players may hold more than one non-FIFA nationality.

Pos.	Nation	Player
GK	SCO	Chris Conway
GK	SCO	Lewis Goram
DF	ENG	Cyril Fairclough
DF	ENG	Eric Massey
DF	RSA	Norman Nielson
DF	ENG	Billy Redman
DF	ENG	Don Wilson
MF	NIR	Peter Tilley
MF	ENG	Henry Cockburn
MF	ENG	Jimmy Greenhalgh
MF	ENG	Tommy Daniel
MF	ENG	Don May

Pos.	Nation	Player
MF	ENG	Les Bardsley
MF	ENG	Walter Kelly
FW	ENG	Johnny Simm
FW	ENG	Johnny Robinson
FW	ENG	Doug Clarke
FW	ENG	Stan Pearson
FW	NIR	Bobby McIlvenny
FW	ENG	Cecil Law
FW	SCO	Harry Gordon
FW	ENG	John Good
FW	ENG	Eddie Gleadall
FW	ENG	Doug Fletcher
