= Football League Third Division North versus South representative matches =

The Football League Third Division North and Football League Third Division South were the third tiers of the English football league pyramid from 1921 to 1958, run by The Football League. It was the highest level where the division was split into more than one league.

From 1954 to 1955 season until 1957–58 season, there was a series of games between teams representing the divisions.

== The representative games ==
1954–55 - played at Reading F.C. ground on 16 March 1955. Attendance 10,438. South won 2–0.

1955–56 - played at Accrington Stanley F.C. ground on 13 October 1955. Attendance 10,521. Draw 3–3.

The second half of the match was broadcast on BBC television, which was the first occasion that a match had been televised from Peel Park.

Don Mills scored for the South in the first half. Reg Ryan equalised with a penalty in the second half, followed by goals from John Thomas Connor for the North and Ernie Morgan for the South. The final score was 3–3.

1956–57 - played at Coventry City F.C. ground on 8 October 1956. Attendance 14,500. South won 2–1.

1956–57 - played at Stockport County F.C. ground on 2 April 1957. Attendance 12,372. Won by North 2–1.

W Holden scored the first goal for the North, which was followed by an equaliser by Neil Langman for the South. Soon after the start of the second half, Ron Greener failed to score for the North from a penalty. The winning goal was scored by Alf Ackerman for the North in the last minute of the game.

1957–58 - played at Crystal Palace F.C. ground on 30 October 1957. Draw 2–2.

== The teams and officials ==
The following players and officials were selected to participate in the representative games.

South Vs. North 16 March 1955

The South Team

Position	Name	Club
1	Ken Oxford	Norwich City
2	Alex Jardine	Millwall
3	Jim Langley	Brighton
4	Brian Nicholas	Queen's Park Rangers
5	John Crosland	Bournemouth
6	Gwyn Hughes	Northampton
7	Wally Hinshelwood	Reading
8	Johnny Rainford	Brentford
9	Eric Day	Southampton
10	Don Mills	Torquay
11	Mike Grice	Colchester
Manager	Mr. A.J. Smith	Reading

The North Team

Position	Name	Club
1	Ray Minshull	Southport
2	Bob Jackson	Oldham
3	Jimmy Harrower	Accrington Stanley
4	Ken Furphy	Darlington
5	Dave Blakey	Chesterfield
6	Frank Clempson	Stockport County
7	Arthur Kaye	Barnsley
8	Jimmy Prescott	Southport
9	George Stewart	Accrington Stanley
10	George Smith	Chesterfield
11	Merfyn Jones	Scunthorpe
Manager	Mr. Fred Emery	Carlisle United

The Officials

Official	Name	From
Referee	Mr. J. H. Husband	London
Linesman (Red Flag)	Mr. C.B. Broome	London
Linesman (Yellow Flag)	Mr. S. W. Barker	Bexleyheath

North Vs. South 13 October 1955

The North Team

Position	Name	Club
1	Ray Minshull	Southport
2	Jimmy Fleming	Workington
3	Vince Kenny	Carlisle United
4	Dennis Stokoe	Workington
5	John Ryden	Accrington Stanley
6	Reg Ryan	Derby County
7	Bobby Webb	Bradford City
8	Ivan Broadis	Carlisle United
9	Jack Connor	Stockport County
10	George Smith	Chesterfield
11	Dennis Woodhead	Chesterfield
Manager	Mr. W. M. Galbraith	Accrington Stanley
Trainer	Mr. H. Hubbick	Accrington Stanley

The South Team

Position	Name	Club
1	Reg Matthews	Coventry City
2	Stanley Charlton	Leyton Orient
3	Alex Jardine	Millwall
4	Noel Simpson	Coventry City
5	Douglas Rees	Ipswich Town
6	Ronnie Ashman	Norwich City
7	Roland Mills	Northampton Town
8	Peter Hill	Coventry City
9	Maurice Cook	Watford
10	Ernie Morgan	Gillingham
11	Jimmy Wheeler	Reading
Manager	Mr. Alec Stock	Leyton Orient
Trainer	Mr. L. Gore	Leyton Orient

Note: Although Peter Hill of Coventry was selected at number 8 for the South, D Mills of Torquay started the game.

The Officials

Official	Name	From
Referee	Mr. K. A. Collinge	Sale
Linesman (Red Flag)	Mr. J. S. McLoughlin	Manchester
Linesman (Yellow Flag)	Mr. R. Sleddon	Preston

South Vs. North 8 October 1956

The South Team

Position	Name	Club
1	Reg Matthews	Coventry City
2	Alex Jardine	Millwall
3	Jim Langley	Brighton
4	Jimmy Belcher	Crystal Palace
5	Patrick Parker	Southampton
6	John Elsworthy	Ipswich Town
7	Johnny Gavin	Norwich City
8	Stan Newsham	Bournemouth
9	Roy Hollis	Southend United
10	Don Mills	Torquay
11	Ken Flint	Aldershot
Reserve	Albert McPherson	Walsall
Reserve	Maurice Cook	Watford
Manager	Harry Warren	Coventry City
Trainer	George Raynor	Coventry City

The North Team

Position	Name	Club
1	Malcolm Newlands	Workington
2	Malcolm Currie	Bradford City
3	Jack Brownsword	Scunthorpe United
4	Albert Mays	Derby County
5	Watty Moore	Hartlepools United
6	Charlie Sneddon	Accrington Stanley
7	Gerry Burrell	Chesterfield
8	Ron Hewitt	Wrexham
9	Ken Johnson	Hartlepools United
10	George Darwin	Mansfield Town
11	George Luke	Hartlepools United
Reserve	Ron Powell	Chesterfield
Reserve	Reg Ryan	Derby County
Manager	Harry Storer	Derby County
Trainer	Billy Newton	Stockport County

The Officials

Official	Name	From
Referee	Mr. Arthur E. Ellis	Halifax
Linesman	Mr. H. Horner	Kenilworth
Linesman	Mr. A. Walters	Warwick

North Vs. South 2 April 1957

The North Team

Position	Name	Club
1	Bob Gray	Gateshead
2	Bobby Brown	Workington
3	Tom Cahill	Barrow
4	Eddie Hunter	Accrington Stanley
5	Ron Greener	Darlington
6	Barry Hutchinson	Chesterfield
7	Ken Finney	Stockport County
8	Ivan Broadis	Carlisle United
9	Alf Ackerman	Carlisle United
10	Bill Holden	Stockport County
11	Brian Cripsey	Hull City
Reserve	Tommy Forgan	York City
Also named	Jack Brownsword	Scunthorpe United
Also named	Gren Jones	Wrexham
Manager	Teddy Davison	Chesterfield
Trainer	W Newton	Stockport County

The South Team

Position	Name	Club
1	Peter Pickering	Northampton
2	Alex Jardine	Millwall
3	George Fisher	Colchester
4	Glen Wilson	Brighton
5	Patrick Parker	Southampton
6	John Elsworthy	Ipswich
7	Mike Hellawell	Queens Park Rangers
8	Don Mills	Torquay
9	Neil Langman	Plymouth
10	Ted Phillips	Ipswich
11	Reg Cutler	Bournemouth
Reserve	Ken Coote	Brentford
Reserve	Maurice Evans	Reading
Manager		
Trainer		

Note: Although Ted Phillips of Ipswich was selected at number 10 for the South, Dorman of Walsall started the game.

The Officials

Official	Name	From
Referee		
Linesman		
Linesman		

South Vs. North 30 October 1957

The South Team

Position	Name	Club
1	Ron Springett	Queen's Park Rangers
2	Roy McCrohan	Norwich
3	Alf Sherwood	Newport County
4	Bobby McLaughlin	Southampton
5	Keith Harvey	Exeter City
6	Glen Wilson	Brighton
7	Bernard Harrison	Crystal Palace
8	Wilf Carter	Plymouth Argyle
9	Roy Hollis	Southend
10	Stan Steele	Port Vale
11	Peter Wright	Colchester
Reserve	John Shepherd	Millwall
Reserve	Maurice Evans	Reading
Manager	Mr. J. Taylor	Queen's Park Rangers

The North Team

Position	Name	Club
1	Roy MacLaren	Bury
2	Eddie Robertson	Bury
3	Paul Feasey	Hull City
4	Jack Bertolini	Workington
5	Wally Taylor	Southport
6	Charlie Crowe	Mansfield
7	John Tomlinson	Chesterfield
8	Ivor Broadis	Carlisle United
9	George Stewart	Accrington Stanley
10	Bill Holden	Stockport County
11	George Luke	Hartlepools
Reserve	Ron Thompson	Carlisle United
Reserve	Tommy Neill	Bury
Manager	Mr. Peter Jackson	Bradford City

The Officials

Official	Name	From
Referee	Mr. D. T. Blues	Richmond
Linesman (Red Flag)	Mr. D. W. Bradley	Selsdon
Linesman (Yellow Flag)	Mr. C. H. Rogers	N. Kensington
