= Cornthwaite =

Cornthwaite is a surname. Notable people with the surname include:

- David Cornthwaite (born 1979), English adventurer, writer, and filmmaker
- Robert Cornthwaite (disambiguation), multiple people
- Tommy Cornthwaite, English footballer

== See also ==
- Norman Cornthwaite Nicholson (1914–1987), English poet
