= George Brooks =

George Brooks may refer to:

- George Washington Brooks (1821–1882), U.S. federal judge
- George M. Brooks (1824–1893), U.S. Representative from Massachusetts
- George Brooks (footballer, born 1887) (1887–1918), English footballer
- George Brooks (footballer, born 1892), (1892–1966), English footballer
- George S. Brooks (1895–1961), American playwright, author, editor and lecturer
- George Brooks (jeweler) (1925–2023), jewelry designer in Canada
- George Brooks (musician) (born 1956), American jazz musician

== See also ==
- Brooks House (Brattleboro, Vermont), built for hotelier George Brooks
- Fort Brooks, Kansas militia fort built on land owned by Ens. George D. Brooks
- George L. Brooks School, a school building in Philadelphia, Pennsylvania
- L. Frank Baum (1856–1919), American author and actor who used the stage name George Brooks
- George Brookes (1934–2011), Tasmanian politician
- George Brooke (disambiguation)
