= James Harrower =

James or Jimmy Harrower may refer to:

- James Harrower (politician) (1833–1892), farmer and political figure in Manitoba
- James Harrower (footballer, born 1878), see list of Hibernian F.C. players
- Jimmy Harrower (footballer, born 1935) (1935–2006), Scottish footballer
- Jimmy Harrower (footballer, born 1924) (1924–1992), Scottish footballer
