= Thomas Cahill (disambiguation) =

Thomas Cahill (1940–2022) was an American scholar and writer.

Thomas or Tom Cahill may also refer to:

- Tom Cahill (American football) (1919–1992), American football coach at Army, 1966–1973
- Tom Cahill (politician) (1924–1983), Australian politician, member of New South Wales Legislative Assembly
- Tom Cahill (baseball) (1868–1894), American Major League Baseball player
- Tom Cahill (footballer, born 1931) (1931–2003), Scottish footballer
- Tom Cahill (footballer, born 1986), English footballer
- Tom Cahill (playwright) (1929–2006), Canadian playwright, songwriter, and television producer
- Thomas J. Cahill (1910–2002), chief of police in San Francisco, California, 1958–1970
- Thomas W. Cahill (1864–1951), American athlete, coach and businessman; a founding father of American soccer
- Thomas Cahill (bishop) (1913–1978), Australian archbishop of Canberra – Goulburn
