= Charles Quest-Ritson =

English horticulturalist and garden writer

Charles Quest-Ritson (born 1947) is an English horticulturalist and garden writer. He is one of Britain's foremost rosarians and is the author of the RHS Encyclopedia of Roses and American Rose Society Encyclopedia of Roses. He was a director of the Royal National Rose Society and founder of the Historic Roses Group. Some of his books are co-authored with his wife, Brigid Quest-Ritson.

== Life and work ==
Quest-Ritson was born on 20 June 1947 in Portsmouth, the eldest son of Gerald Ritson, a lieutenant in the Royal Marines, and Margaret Quest Thomson. He is the grandson of the mining engineer Professor John Ritson and the great-great-grandson of Thomas Alexander Dickson, the Liberal and Irish Nationalist MP.

He attended Stoke House preparatory school in Seaford, Sussex and won gardening prizes there from the age of nine. He developed his skills in his grandparents' ten-acre garden; and his father's garden, designed by Gertrude Jekyll. He was privately educated at Winchester College, where his housemaster was Dr Peter Partner, the historian of late-mediaeval Italy. He graduated in 1969 with a degree in history from the University of Warwick, where his tutor was Professor Sir John Rigby Hale. He began his professional life as a tax lawyer. He married Brigid and the couple had two daughters and a son. He has British and Irish nationality.

The couple were partners in the Corsley Mill Nurseries (1983-1993), propagating own root roses. From 2004 to 2020 the couple owned 12 acres of woodland and orchards in on the Cherbourg Peninsula, Normandy, in northern France. His garden contained over 1000 roses. They then moved back to England; their home near Salisbury has two acres of gardens on chalk. He is fluent in five languages and has specialised in writing about gardens across the world.

He regularly authors expert guides for the Royal Horticultural Society. The RHS Encyclopaedia of Roses (2003) in Italian translation, won the literary Grinzane Cavour Prize (2006). His first published horticultural book was The English Garden Abroad (1992) and he has written more than ten further guides over the following thirty years. He was a director of the Royal National Rose Society (extant 1876-2017), founder of the Historic Roses Group and a fellow of the Linnaean Society. He is also a regular columnist for Country Life magazine.

== Works ==
- RHS Encyclopedia of Roses (2011)
- The English Garden: A Social History (2010)
- Ninfa (2009)
- RHS Garden Finders
- Olive Oil (2004)
- Climbing Roses of the World (2003)
- American Rose Society Encyclopedia of Roses: the Definitive A-Z Guide (2003)
- The English Garden (2001)
- The Royal Horticultural Society Gardener's Handbook (1999)
- Gardens of Germany (also all the photographs) (1998)
- Garden Lover's Guide to Germany (1998)
- Gardens of Europe
- Country Gardens (1998)
- The English Garden Abroad (1992)
