= Harry Warren (footballer) =

English football manager (c.1903 – 1968)

Personal information
- Date of birth: c.1903
- Place of birth: England
- Date of death: 5 April 1968
- Place of death: Southend, England

Senior career*
Years	Team	Apps	(Gls)
- Folkestone Invicta

Managerial career
- 1931–1939: Folkestone Invicta
- 1939–1945: Chelmsford City
- 1946–1956: Southend United
- 1956–1957: Coventry City
- * Club domestic league appearances and goals

Harry Warren (c.1903 – 5 April 1968) was the manager of Southend United football club between 1946 and 1956.

== Managerial career ==
Warren joined Folkestone Invicta in 1931 as a player-manager role. Warren left the club in 1939, joining Chelmsford City. During World War II, Southend United moved into Chelmsford's New Writtle Street Stadium. Warren became manager of both teams, remaining at Southend until 1956. Warren was manager of Coventry City between 1956 and 1957 having taken over from former Sweden international manager George Raynor. He was succeeded by Billy Frith. He was asked to manage the Third Division South representative team in 1956/57.
