= Roy MacLaren =

Roy MacLaren may refer to:

- Roy MacLaren (footballer) (1930–2022), Scottish footballer
- Roy MacLaren (politician) (born 1934), Canadian politician
