= Gleadall =

Gleadall is a surname. Notable people with the surname include:

- Alfie Gleadall (born 2000), English cricketer
- Eddie Gleadall (died 1993), English football player
