= William Redman =

William Redman may refer to:

- William Redman (bishop), English bishop
- William Redman (politician), Australian politician
- Billy Redman, English footballer
