= Acquroff =

Acquroff is a surname. Notable people with the surname include:

- Jack Acquroff (1911–1987), English footballer
- Helen Acquroff (1831–1887), Scottish musician, pianist, music teacher, singer, and poet
