= Ian Ward (athlete) =

British athlete

Personal information
- Nationality: British (English)
- Born: 25 February 1929 Preston, Lancashire, England
- Died: 8 March 2006 (aged 77) Todmorden, England

Sport
- Sport: Athletics
- Event: pole vault
- Club: Bury AC

Ian Ward (25 February 1929 – 8 March 2006), was a male athlete who competed for England.

== Biography ==
Ward was born in Preston, Lancashire, England and his father Frank Ward played football for Preston North End F.C. Ward was educated at Hutton Grammar School before earning a teaching certificate in physical education at Loughborough College. He then obtained a master's degree's at the University of Leeds, a Graduate Fellowship at University of North Carolina and a PhD from the University of Liverpool. He then played rugby for Preston Grasshoppers R.F.C.

Ward finished third behind Geoff Elliott in the pole vault event at the 1953 AAA Championships. He became the British pole vault champion after winning the British AAA Championships title at the 1956 AAA Championships and 1957 AAA Championships.

He represented the England athletics team in the pole vault at the 1958 British Empire and Commonwealth Games in Cardiff, Wales.
