= Bobby Webb (footballer) =

English footballer (1933–2023)

Personal information
- Full name: Robert Webb
- Date of birth: 29 November 1933
- Place of birth: Altofts, Wakefield, England
- Date of death: 16 June 2023 (aged 89)
- Place of death: Altofts, Wakefield, England
- Position: Inside forward

Youth career
- Silkstone Rovers
- Whitwood Technical
- Leeds United

Senior career*
Years	Team	Apps	(Gls)
1951–1955	Leeds United	3	(0)
1955	Walsall	9	(3)
1955–1962	Bradford City	208	(59)
1962–1963	Torquay United	49	(12)
- * Club domestic league appearances and goals

Robert Webb (29 November 1933 – 16 June 2023) was an English footballer, whose career was cut short by a broken leg at the age of just 29. He was an inside forward.

== Career ==
Bobby Webb started his football career with Leeds United at the age of 15, but two years of National Service interrupted the start to his career. He appeared in the Central League and United's Northern Intermediate League Cup winning sides from 1950 to 1952. He played just three full games for Leeds, making his debut alongside John Charles in March 1954 against Brentford, before he moved to Walsall. He spent just four months at Walsall before joining Bradford City in July 1955.

He played a total of 208 league games for City, scoring 59 goals, including 18 as he finished the club's top goal-scorer in 1955–56. He failed to score in 11 league games in his final season at City after the club's relegation to Division Four but did score a hat-trick as the club lost 4–3 to top flight side Aston Villa in the League Cup. He was selected to play for the Third Division North team against the South in 1955/56.

He moved to Torquay United but after one successful season at Plainmoor he was forced to retire after suffering a broken leg, aged only 29. He had scored a total of 74 league goals.

== Death ==
Webb died in Altofts on 16 June 2023, at the age of 89.

== Sources ==
- Frost, Terry (1988). Bradford City A Complete Record 1903–1988. Breedon Books Sport. p. 146. ISBN 0-907969-38-0.
