= George Brooke =

George Brooke or Brook may refer to:

- George Brook (cricketer) (1888–1966), English cricketer
- George Brook (zoologist), British zoologist
- George H. Brooke (1874–1938), American football player and coach
- George C. Brooke (1884–1934), British numismatist
- George Brooke (conspirator) (1568–1603), British aristocrat executed for conspiracy against James VI of Scotland and I of England
- George Brooke, 9th Baron Cobham (c. 1497–1558), English nobleman
- George Brooke (MP) (fl. 1584), MP for Eye
- George J. Brooke, British biblical scholar
- George Mercer Brooke (1785–1851), colonel who established Fort Brooke, predecessor to Tampa, Florida
- George Brooke alias Cobham (fl. 1559), MP for Hedon and Portsmouth

== See also ==
- George's Brook, Newfoundland village
- George Brooks (disambiguation)
