= Alex Jardine =

Scottish footballer

Personal information
- Full name: Alexander Jardine
- Date of birth: 12 April 1926
- Place of birth: Motherwell, Scotland
- Date of death: 6 June 1978 (aged 52)
- Place of death: London, England
- Position: Full back

Youth career
- Wishaw

Senior career*
Years	Team	Apps	(Gls)
1946–1950	Dundee United	68	(2)
1950–1958	Millwall	299	(25)
- * Club domestic league appearances and goals

Alexander Jardine (12 April 1926 – 6 June 1978) was a Scottish footballer, who played as a full back.

== Career ==
Jardine began his career in the mid-1940s with Dundee United, spending four years at Tannadice before moving to Millwall in 1950 for £700. He was selected to play for the Third Division South representative side in 1954/55, 1955/56 and 1956/57 (both games). Jardine spent eight years with Millwall before retiring in 1958 due to an Achilles tendon injury.

Jardine died in 1978.
