= Stan Newsham =

English footballer

Personal information
- Date of birth: 24 May 1931
- Place of birth: Farnworth, England
- Date of death: 4 May 2001 (aged 69)
- Place of death: Portsmouth, England
- Position: Inside forward

Senior career*
| Years | Team | Apps | (Gls) |
- Daubhill Athletic
| | Bolton Wanderers | 0 | (0) |
| 1952–1957 | Bournemouth | 142 | (74) |
| 1957–1962 | Notts County | 99 | (44) |
| Total | | 241 | (118) |
- * Club domestic league appearances and goals

Stan Newsham (24 May 1931 – 4 May 2001) was an English professional footballer who played as an inside forward for Bournemouth and Notts County.

== Career ==
Born in Farnworth, Newsham spent his early career with Daubhill Athletic and Bolton Wanderers, where he played as an amateur. He was signed for Bournemouth in 1952 by Jack Bruton. Newsham spent five years at Bournemouth, scoring 74 goals in 142 appearances in the Football League, and 78 goals in 152 appearances in all competitions. During this time he was the club's leading goalscorer in three consecutive seasons, 1954–55, 1955–56 and 1956–57. In October 1956 he played in the Football League Third Division North vs. South Representative Games. In 1957 Newsham was a member of the Bournemouth & Boscombe team that reached the quarter-finals of the FA Cup. In the first three rounds, they knocked out Burton Albion, Swindon Town and Accrington Stanley, scoring 11 goals in the process and conceding none. However it was the next three games that saw the team attract national attention. In the 4th round they beat a Wolves team featuring Billy Wright 1–0 in front of a crowd of 42,000. Wolves were, at the time, placed third in the First Division. In the 5th round they faced 2nd-placed Tottenham Hotspur with a team that included Danny Blanchflower, Terry Medwin and Ted Ditchburn. At their home ground of Dean Court in front of 25,892, Bournemouth won 3–1 with Newsham scoring the second goal with a header (see caption). In the quarter-finals they faced Manchester United, the league leaders and current Football League Champions. In front of 28,799 at Dean Court they took a shock lead after just 10 minutes. However, they eventually lost 2–1 to the Busby Babes. He played for Notts County between 1957 and 1962, scoring 44 goals in 99 appearances in the Football League. Newsham retired due to injury in 1962. Over the course of his career, Newsham scored 118 goals in 241 appearances in the Football League.
