= Willie Kelly (footballer) =

Scottish footballer

Personal information
- Full name: William Muir Kelly
- Date of birth: 14 August 1922
- Place of birth: Hill of Beath, Scotland
- Date of death: 11 July 1996 (aged 73)
- Place of death: Blackburn, England
- Position: Centre half

Youth career
- Hill of Beath Star

Senior career*
Years	Team	Apps	(Gls)
1943–1946	Dunfermline Athletic	0	(0)
1946–1951	Airdrieonians	83	(14)
1951–1957	Blackburn Rovers	186	(1)
1957	Mossley	7	(0)
1957–1958	Accrington Stanley	24	(0)
- Darwen
Total		300	(15)
- * Club domestic league appearances and goals

William Muir Kelly (14 August 1922 – 11 July 1996) was a Scottish professional footballer who played as a centre half for Dunfermline Athletic, Airdrieonians, Blackburn Rovers, Mossley, Accrington Stanley and Darwen. His younger brother Walter Kelly was also a professional footballer; their father and two more brothers played at a lower level in Fife.
