= Frank Ward (footballer) =

English footballer

Personal information
- Date of birth: 21 January 1902
- Place of birth: Leigh, Lancashire, England
- Date of death: 28 April 1974 (aged 72)
- Place of death: Preston, England
- Height: 5 ft 9 in (1.75 m)
- Position: Full-back

Youth career
- Walshaw United

Senior career*
Years	Team	Apps	(Gls)
1923–1927	Bury	44	(0)
1927–1933	Preston North End	208	(3)
1933–1935	Southampton	27	(0)
1935–19??	Folkestone		
- * Club domestic league appearances and goals

Frank Ward (21 January 1902 – 28 April 1974) was an English footballer who played as a full-back for various clubs in the 1920s and 1930s, spending most of his career with Preston North End.

== Football career ==
Ward was born in Leigh, Lancashire, before moving to the north of Manchester, where he played his youth football with Walshaw United. From here he made the short move to join Football League Second Division club Bury in October 1923.

Generally playing at left-half, Ward made 19 appearances in the 1923–24 season, at the end of which Bury finished as runners-up, thus gaining promotion to the First Division. Following their promotion, Bury signed Bill Turner from Southampton in April 1924, with Stan Woodhouse and John Callagher moving to the south coast as part of the deal. With Turner ever-present in 1924–25, Ward spent the entire season in the reserves, but injury to Turner allowed Ward to return in the 1925–26 season, making ten appearances. Bury finished the season fourth in the league table, which remains their highest-ever league finish.

In the following season Ward retained his place, but the team failed to maintain the previous season's form and slumped to 19th place, just above the relegation zone. Manager James Hunter tried several players at left-half, eventually settling on Harry Dutton, with Ward making 15 appearances.

In the summer of 1927, Ward moved back to the Second Division, joining Preston North End in June, making his debut on 12 November 1927 in a 3–3 draw against West Bromwich Albion. Ward was the 350th player to appear for Preston, where he played firstly at right-half before moving to right-back, rarely missing a match during his six years at Deepdale. During his time with Preston, the club generally finished each season in mid-table, with their highest finish being fourth in 1927–28.

In July 1933, he moved to fellow Second Division club, Southampton, where his experience and versatility were of great help to a side that had been struggling, both on and off the pitch. He played the first seven games of the 1933–34 season at centre-half, before handing over the No. 5 shirt back to the long-serving Arthur Bradford. After spending most of the season in the reserves, Ward made three further appearances towards the end of the season.

At the start of the following season, Ward demonstrated his versatility by playing twice at inside-left, before settling into the right-half position. After playing the first 13 games of the season, he lost his place to another "Saints" stalwart, Ward's former Bury teammate Stan Woodhouse. After four further appearances, Ward was given a free transfer to Folkestone of the Southern League in the summer of 1935.

== Personal life ==
His son Ian Ward represented England in the pole vault at the 1958 British Empire and Commonwealth Games in Cardiff, Wales.

== Honours ==
Bury

- Football League Second Division: Runners-up 1923–24
