= Alf Ackerman =

South African footballer (1929–1988)

Personal information
- Full name: Alfred Arthur Eric Ackerman
- Date of birth: 5 January 1929
- Place of birth: Pretoria, South Africa
- Date of death: 10 July 1988 (aged 59)
- Place of death: Dunnottan, South Africa
- Position: Striker

Senior career*
Years	Team	Apps	(Gls)
- Pretoria Municipals
1947–1950	Clyde	33	(20)
1950–1951	Hull City	34	(21)
1951–1953	Norwich City	66	(31)
1953–1955	Hull City	58	(29)
1955–1956	Derby County	36	(21)
1956–1959	Carlisle United	97	(61)
1959–1961	Millwall	81	(35)
1961–1966	Dartford		
Total		405	(217)

Managerial career
- 1961–1966: Dartford
- 1969–1974: Gravesend & Northfleet
- * Club domestic league appearances and goals

Alfred Arthur Eric Ackerman (5 January 1929 – 10 July 1988) was a South African professional footballer. Born in Pretoria, Ackerman spent the majority of his career in Scotland and England, playing with Clyde, Hull City, Norwich City, Derby County, Carlisle United and Millwall. He was selected to play for the Third Division North side against the South in April 1957. After retiring as a player in 1961, Ackerman became player-manager of Dartford, and later manager of Gravesend & Northfleet. He died in Dunottan at the age of 59.

Ackerman finished as the top goal scorer in the Transvaal League in South Africa for two consecutive seasons before signing for Clyde.

He was one of three South African footballers to play for Hull City in the 1950s, the others being Norman Nielson and Neil Cubie.

He scored 37 goals for Carlisle United in season 1957–58.

== Career statistics ==
Appearances and goals by club, season and competition
Club	Season	Division	League		National Cup		League Cup		Total	
Club	Season	Division	Apps	Goals	Apps	Goals	Apps	Goals	Apps	Goals
Clyde	1947–48	Scottish Division A	2	1	0	0	0	0	2	1
Clyde	1948–49	Scottish Division A	10	7	0	0	4	1	14	8
Clyde	1949–50	Scottish Division A	21	12	1	1	6	1	28	14
Clyde	Total		33	20	1	1	10	2	44	23
Hull City	1950–51	English Division Two	34	21	3	0	0	0	37	21
Hull City	1953–54	English Division Two	29	18	7	2	0	0	36	20
Hull City	1954–55	English Division Two	29	11	1	0	0	0	30	11
Hull City	Total		82	50	11	2	0	0	91	52
Career Total			115	70	12	3	10	2	137	75

== Honours ==
Derby County

- Division Three South runners-up: 1956–57

Dartford

- Southern Division One promotion: 1962–63

Northfleet

- Southern Division One promotion: 1970–71

Individual

- Division Three South Top Scorer: 1957–58
