= Neil Cubie =

South African soccer player

Personal information
- Full name: Neil George Cubie
- Date of birth: 3 November 1932
- Place of birth: Cape Town, South Africa
- Date of death: March 1977 (aged 44)
- Place of death: Cape Town, South Africa
- Position: Right back

Senior career*
Years	Team	Apps	(Gls)
- Clyde
1956–1957	Bury	0	(0)
1957–1958	Hull City	4	(0)
1958	Scarborough		
Total		4	(0)
- * Club domestic league appearances and goals

Neil George Cubie (3 November 1932 – March 1977) was a South African professional footballer who played as a right back.

== Career ==
Born in Cape Town, Cubie played for Clyde, Bury, Hull City and Scarborough. He was one of three South African footballers to play for Hull City in the 1950s, the others being Alf Ackerman and Norman Nielson.
