= Micky Lydon =

English footballer (1933–2022)

Personal information
- Full name: George Michael Lydon
- Date of birth: 25 November 1933
- Place of birth: Sunderland, England
- Date of death: December 2022 (aged 89)
- Place of death: Hampshire, England
- Position: Inside forward

Youth career
- Hylton Colliery Juniors

Senior career*
Years	Team	Apps	(Gls)
1950–1954	Sunderland	0	(0)
1954–1955	Leeds United	4	(1)
1955–1959	Gateshead	106	(24)
- * Club domestic league appearances and goals

George Michael Lydon (25 November 1933 – December 2022) was an English footballer who played as an inside forward.

Lydon played league football for Leeds United and Gateshead between 1954 and 1959 after starting his career at hometown club Sunderland. He died in Hampshire in December 2022, at the age of 89.

== Sources ==
- "Micky Lydon". Post War English & Scottish Football League A–Z Player's Transfer Database.
