= Wally Taylor (footballer) =

English professional footballer who played as a centre half

Personal information
- Date of birth: 30 October 1926
- Place of birth: Kirton in Lindsey, England
- Date of death: 2005 (aged 78–79)
- Position: Full back

Senior career*
Years	Team	Apps	(Gls)
- Hibaldstow
1949–1951	Grimsby Town	21	(0)
1951–1958	Southport	269	(1)
1958–1960	Oldham Athletic	51	(0)
- Brigg Town
Total		341	(1)
- * Club domestic league appearances and goals

Wally Taylor (30 October 1926 – 2005) was an English professional footballer who played as a centre half.

== Career ==
Born in Kirton in Lindsey, Taylor played forHibaldstow, Grimsby Town, Southport, Oldham Athletic and Brigg Town.
