= Johnny Robinson (footballer) =

English footballer (1936–2019)

Personal information
- Full name: John Robinson
- Date of birth: 18 February 1936
- Place of birth: Chorley, England
- Date of death: June 2019 (aged 83)
- Position: Winger

Youth career
- –1954: Leyland Motors

Senior career*
Years	Team	Apps	(Gls)
1954–1961	Bury	120	(21)
1961–19??	Oldham Athletic	3	(0)
Total		123	(21)
- * Club domestic league appearances and goals

John Robinson (18 April 1936 – June 2019) was an English professional footballer who played as a winger.

== Career ==
Born in Chorley, Robinson originally played for Leyland Motors before signing for Bury in 1954. Deployed as an outside right, he scored 21 goals in a total of 127 appearances for the club before joining Oldham Athletic in 1961.

Robinson died in early June 2019, at the age of 83.
