= George Stewart (footballer, born 1932) =

Scottish footballer

Personal information
- Full name: George Scott Stewart
- Date of birth: 16 November 1932
- Place of birth: Larkhall, Scotland
- Date of death: 22 May 1998 (aged 65)
- Place of death: Glasgow, Scotland
- Height: 6 ft 2 in (1.88 m)
- Position: Goalkeeper

Youth career
- Petershill

Senior career*
Years	Team	Apps	(Gls)
1952–1958	Raith Rovers	48	(0)
1958–1959	Stirling Albion	16	(0)
1959	Montrose	4	(0)
1959–1962	Bradford City	22	(0)
- * Club domestic league appearances and goals

George Stewart (16 November 1932 – 22 May 1998) was a Scottish footballer, who played as a goalkeeper for Petershill Juniors, Raith Rovers, Stirling Albion, Montrose and Bradford City.

Born in Larkhall in 1932, Stewart started his career with junior side Petershill. He was capped by the Scotland junior select team while with the club in 1951. He joined the senior game when he signed for Raith Rovers in 1952. He made 68 appearances in the Scottish Football League for three clubs in seven seasons, before moving to England to join Bradford City in 1959. He made 22 Football League appearances before leaving the senior game in 1961.
