= Percy Slater =

English footballer

Personal information
- Full name: Percival Slater
- Date of birth: 5 February 1879
- Place of birth: Adlington, England
- Date of death: 1951 (aged 78–79)
- Position: Inside forward

Senior career*
Years	Team	Apps	(Gls)
1898–1899	Blackburn Rovers	0	(0)
1899–1900	Chorley		
1900–1904	Manchester City	20	(0)
1904–1906	Bury	28	(0)
1906–1909	Oldham Athletic		
1909–1913	Chorley		
1913	Altrincham		
Total		48	(0)
- * Club domestic league appearances and goals

Percival Slater (5 February 1879–1951) was an English footballer, who played in the Football League for Bury and Manchester City.
