= James Harrower (politician) =

Canadian politician (1833–1892)

James Harrower (March 13, 1833 – December 18, 1892) was a farmer and political figure in Manitoba. He represented Shoal Lake from 1888 to 1892 in the Legislative Assembly of Manitoba as a Liberal.

He was born in North Sherbrooke Township, Lanark County, Upper Canada, the son of a Scottish immigrant. Harrower married Mary Ann Smith in 1854. He worked in the Lake Superior copper mines from 1858 to 1861, later moving to Oregon and then Vancouver Island. In 1880, he settled in St. Paul parish near Winnipeg. Harrower served on the municipal council for St. Paul. In 1884, he moved to Strathclair. Harrower died in Winnipeg at the age of 59.
