= Norman Nielson =

South African soccer player

Personal information
- Full name: Norman Frederick Nielson
- Date of birth: 6 November 1928
- Place of birth: Johannesburg, South Africa
- Date of death: 1 January 2002 (aged 73)
- Place of death: Derby, England
- Position: Centre-half

Senior career*
Years	Team	Apps	(Gls)
- Arcadia Shepherds
1949–1951	Charlton Athletic	1	(0)
1951–1954	Derby County	57	(8)
1954–1957	Bury	100	(5)
1957–1958	Hull City	25	(0)
- Corby Town
1959	Gresley Rovers	12	(0)
- Hinckley Athletic
- Long Eaton United
- Ripley Miners Welfare
Total		195	(13)
- * Club domestic league appearances and goals

Norman Frederick Nielson (6 November 1928 – 1 January 2002) was a South African professional soccer player who played as a centre half.

== Career ==
Born in Johannesburg, Nielson played for Arcadia Shepherds, Charlton Athletic, Derby County, Bury, Hull City, Corby Town, Gresley Rovers, Hinckley Athletic, Long Eaton United and Ripley Miners Welfare. He was one of three South African footballers to play for Hull City in the 1950s, the others being Alf Ackerman and Neil Cubie.
