= Jimmy Harrower (footballer, born 1924) =

Scottish footballer (1924–1992)

Personal information
- Full name: James Swanson Harrower
- Date of birth: 19 June 1924
- Place of birth: Dunfermline, Scotland
- Date of death: February 1992 (aged 67)
- Place of death: Blackburn, England
- Position: Left back

Youth career
- Dunfermline Athletic

Senior career*
Years	Team	Apps	(Gls)
1947–1954	Third Lanark	165	(2)
1954–1961	Accrington Stanley	246	(2)
Total		411	(4)

Managerial career
- 1960–1961: Accrington Stanley
- * Club domestic league appearances and goals

James Swanson Harrower (19 June 1924 – February 1992) was a Scottish professional footballer who played as a left back in the Football League. He played for Scottish club Third Lanark and English club Accrington Stanley in seven-year spells, from 1947 to 1961.

== Football career ==
Harrower moved from his native Dunfermline to Third Lanark in July 1947. An ever-present in their 1949–50 campaign, he made 165 league appearances for the club. In December 1954 he joined Accrington Stanley, halfway through their Third Division North second place campaign. Ever present in Stanley's third-place finish in 1955-56, he excelled in both the left-back role, and the centre-back position. In 1957–58 his club once again finished in second place in the league. In April 1960 he was appointed player-manager, overseeing the end of a relegation campaign before presiding over an 18th-place finish the following year. He eventually resigned his post in December 1961; despite Stanley's dire league form until that point of the season, his resignation was ultimately forced by the club's policy of only appointing player-managers, and the fact that he was no longer able to play effectively. The club would be managed by a director's committee for the remainder of the season, making Harrower the final manager to take charge of this incarnation of Stanley in the Football League.

== Post-retirement ==
After leaving the game he became a publican, then a heating engineer.

Harrower died in Blackburn in February 1992, at the age of 67.

== Honours ==
With Accrington Stanley

- Football League Third Division North runner-up: 1954–55 & 1957–58

== Sources ==
- Hugman, Barry (2005). The PFA Premier and Football League Players' Records 1946-2005. Queen Anne Press.
