= George Brooks (footballer, born 1887) =

English footballer

Personal information
- Full name: George Harold Brooks
- Date of birth: 1887
- Place of birth: Radcliffe, England
- Date of death: 8 November 1918 (aged 30–31)
- Place of death: Bihécourt, France
- Height: 5 ft 10 in (1.78 m)
- Positions: Half back; centre forward

Senior career*
Years	Team	Apps	(Gls)
- Longfield
1910–1912	Manchester City	3	(1)
1912	Bury	2	(0)
1912–1914	South Shields		
1914–1915	Derby County	33	(0)
- * Club domestic league appearances and goals

George Harold Brooks (1887 – 8 November 1918) was an English professional footballer who played as a half back and centre forward in the Football League for Derby County, Manchester City and Bury.

== Personal life ==
In January 1917, 2 1/2 years after the outbreak of the First World War, Brooks enlisted in the York and Lancaster Regiment. He was holding the rank of lance corporal when he was wounded in an attack on Neuf-Mesnil on 8 November 1918. Brooks died of wounds at 5th Casualty Clearing Station in Bihécourt, Picardy, France later that day, three days before the armistice. He was buried in Maubeuge (Sous-le-Bois) Cemetery.

== Career statistics ==
Appearances and goals by club, season and competition
Club	Season	League			FA Cup		Total	
Club	Season	Division	Apps	Goals	Apps	Goals	Apps	Goals
Manchester City	1910–11	First Division	1	0	0	0	1	0
Manchester City	1911–12	First Division	2	1	0	0	2	1
Manchester City	Total		3	1	0	0	3	1
Bury	1911–12	First Division	1	0	0	0	1	0
Bury	1912–13	Second Division	1	0	0	0	1	0
Bury	Total		2	0	0	0	2	0
Derby County	1914–15	Second Division	33	0	1	0	34	0
Career total			38	1	1	0	39	1

== Honours ==
Derby County

- Football League Second Division: 1914–15
