= Malcolm Currie =

Scottish footballer

Personal information
- Date of birth: 5 February 1932
- Place of birth: Rutherglen, Scotland
- Date of death: 1996 (aged 63–64)
- Position: Full back

Senior career*
Years	Team	Apps	(Gls)
–1956	Rutherglen Glencairn		
1956–1961	Bradford City	136	(1)
1961–????	Nelson		
- * Club domestic league appearances and goals

Malcolm Currie (5 February 1932 – 1996) was a Scottish professional footballer who played as a full back.

== Career ==
Born in Rutherglen, Currie began his career with hometown club Rutherglen Glencairn, before moving to English league side Bradford City in 1956. Currie made 136 league appearances for Bradford, before leaving in 1961 to join non-league side Nelson.
