= 1957–58 Football League =

59th season of the Football League

The Football League
- Season: 1957–58
- Champions: Wolverhampton Wanderers

The 1957–58 season was the 59th completed season of The Football League. The first division title went to Wolverhampton Wanderers for the second time, while Sunderland were relegated to the second division for the first time in the club's history, after 57 consecutive seasons in the top flight of English football. The season was marred by the Munich air disaster, in which eight Manchester United players died as a result of the crash with two others suffering career-ending injuries. Manchester United were chasing a hat-trick of league championships, but they dropped 21 points in 14 matches after the Munich crash and finished 21 points behind the champions Wolves.

This was the final season in which the Football League was organized into two regional sections on the third tier. Following the season, the bottom twelve clubs of Third Division North and South were assigned to the new, national Fourth Division. The clubs placed second through twelfth, in addition to the two clubs relegated from the Second Division, joined the re-organized national Third Division.

== Final league tables ==
The tables below are reproduced here in the exact form that they can be found at The Rec.Sport.Soccer Statistics Foundation website and in Rothmans Book of Football League Records 1888–89 to 1978–79, with home and away statistics separated.

Beginning with the season 1894–95, clubs finishing level on points were separated according to goal average (goals scored divided by goals conceded), or more properly put, goal ratio. In case one or more teams had the same goal difference, this system favoured those teams who had scored fewer goals. The goal average system was eventually scrapped beginning with the 1976–77 season.

From the 1922–23 season, the bottom two teams of both Third Division North and Third Division South were required to apply for re-election.

== First Division ==
First Division
- Season: 1957–58
- Champions: Wolverhampton Wanderers; 2nd English title
- Relegated: Sunderland; Sheffield Wednesday
- European Cup: Wolverhampton Wanderers
- Inter-Cities Fairs Cup: Chelsea; Birmingham City
- Matches: 462
- Goals: 1,721 (3.73 per match)
- Top goalscorer: Bobby Smith (36 goals)
- Biggest home win: Preston North End 8–0 Birmingham City (1 February 1958)
- Biggest away win: Sunderland 1–6 Birmingham City (5 April 1958)
- Highest scoring: Leicester City 8–4 Manchester City (22 February 1958)

Pos	Team	Pld	W	D	L	GF	GA	GAv	Pts	Qualification or relegation
1	Wolverhampton Wanderers (C)	42	28	8	6	103	47	2.191	64	Qualification for the European Cup first round
2	Preston North End	42	26	7	9	100	51	1.961	59	
3	Tottenham Hotspur	42	21	9	12	93	77	1.208	51	
4	West Bromwich Albion	42	18	14	10	92	70	1.314	50	
5	Manchester City	42	22	5	15	104	100	1.040	49	
6	Burnley	42	21	5	16	80	74	1.081	47	
7	Blackpool	42	19	6	17	80	67	1.194	44	
8	Luton Town	42	19	6	17	69	63	1.095	44	
9	Manchester United	42	16	11	15	85	75	1.133	43	
10	Nottingham Forest	42	16	10	16	69	63	1.095	42	
11	Chelsea	42	15	12	15	83	79	1.051	42	Qualification for the Inter-Cities Fairs Cup first round
12	Arsenal	42	16	7	19	73	85	0.859	39	
13	Birmingham City	42	14	11	17	76	89	0.854	39	Qualification for the Inter-Cities Fairs Cup first round
14	Aston Villa	42	16	7	19	73	86	0.849	39	
15	Bolton Wanderers	42	14	10	18	65	87	0.747	38	
16	Everton	42	13	11	18	65	75	0.867	37	
17	Leeds United	42	14	9	19	51	63	0.810	37	
18	Leicester City	42	14	5	23	91	112	0.813	33	
19	Newcastle United	42	12	8	22	73	81	0.901	32	
20	Portsmouth	42	12	8	22	73	88	0.830	32	
21	Sunderland (R)	42	10	12	20	54	97	0.557	32	Relegation to the Second Division
22	Sheffield Wednesday (R)	42	12	7	23	69	92	0.750	31	Relegation to the Second Division

Source: World Football
Rules for classification: 1) Points; 2) Goal average; 3) Goals scored
(C) Champions; (R) Relegated

=== Results ===
Home \ Away	ARS	AST	BIR	BLP	BOL	BUR	CHE	EVE	LEE	LEI	LUT	MCI	MUN	NEW	NOT	POR	PNE	SHW	SUN	TOT	WBA	WOL
Arsenal		4–0	1–3	2–3	1–2	0–0	5–4	2–3	2–1	3–1	2–0	2–1	4–5	2–3	1–1	3–2	4–2	1–0	3–0	4–4	2–2	0–2
Aston Villa	3–0		0–2	1–1	4–0	3–0	1–3	0–1	2–0	5–1	2–0	1–2	3–2	4–3	1–1	2–1	2–2	2–0	5–2	1–1	2–1	2–3
Birmingham City	4–1	3–1		0–0	5–1	2–3	3–3	2–1	1–1	0–1	1–1	4–0	3–3	1–4	0–2	4–1	3–1	1–0	2–3	0–0	3–5	1–5
Blackpool	1–0	1–1	4–2		2–3	2–4	2–1	0–1	3–0	5–1	1–2	2–5	1–4	3–2	3–0	2–1	1–2	2–2	7–0	0–2	2–0	3–2
Bolton Wanderers	0–1	4–0	1–0	3–0		2–1	3–3	1–5	0–2	2–3	1–2	0–2	4–0	1–1	2–0	1–0	0–4	5–4	2–2	3–2	2–2	1–1
Burnley	2–1	3–0	3–1	2–1	3–1		2–1	0–2	3–1	7–3	1–2	2–1	3–0	0–2	3–1	3–1	2–0	2–0	6–0	2–0	2–2	1–1
Chelsea	0–0	4–2	5–1	1–4	2–2	6–1		3–1	2–1	4–0	1–3	2–3	2–1	2–1	0–0	7–4	0–2	1–0	0–0	2–4	2–2	1–2
Everton	2–2	1–2	0–2	0–0	1–1	1–1	3–0		0–1	2–2	0–2	2–5	3–3	1–2	1–1	4–2	4–2	1–1	3–1	3–4	1–1	1–0
Leeds United	2–0	4–0	1–1	2–1	2–1	1–0	0–0	1–0		2–1	0–2	2–4	1–1	3–0	1–2	2–0	2–3	2–2	2–1	1–2	1–1	1–1
Leicester City	0–1	6–1	2–2	2–1	2–3	5–3	3–2	2–2	3–0		4–1	8–4	0–3	2–1	3–1	2–2	1–3	4–1	4–1	1–3	3–3	2–3
Luton Town	4–0	3–0	3–0	2–0	1–0	3–2	0–2	0–1	1–1	2–1		1–2	2–2	0–3	3–1	2–1	1–3	2–0	7–1	0–0	5–1	3–1
Manchester City	2–4	1–2	1–1	4–3	2–1	4–1	5–2	6–2	1–0	4–3	2–2		2–2	2–1	1–1	2–1	2–0	2–0	3–1	5–1	4–1	3–4
Manchester United	4–2	4–1	0–2	1–2	7–2	1–0	0–1	3–0	5–0	4–0	3–0	4–1		1–1	1–1	0–3	0–0	2–1	2–2	3–4	0–4	0–4
Newcastle United	3–3	2–4	1–2	1–2	1–2	1–3	1–3	2–3	1–2	5–3	3–2	4–1	1–2		1–4	2–0	0–2	0–0	2–2	3–1	3–0	1–1
Nottingham Forest	4–0	4–1	1–1	1–2	0–0	7–0	1–1	0–3	1–1	3–1	1–0	2–1	1–2	2–3		2–0	2–1	5–2	2–0	1–2	0–2	1–4
Portsmouth	5–4	1–0	3–2	1–2	2–2	0–0	3–0	3–2	1–2	2–0	5–0	2–1	3–3	2–2	1–4		0–2	3–2	0–2	5–1	2–2	1–1
Preston North End	3–0	1–1	8–0	2–1	3–0	2–1	5–2	3–1	3–0	4–1	1–0	6–1	1–1	2–1	2–0	4–0		3–0	3–0	3–1	3–1	1–2
Sheffield Wednesday	2–0	2–5	5–3	0–3	1–0	1–2	2–3	2–1	3–2	2–1	2–1	4–5	1–0	1–0	1–2	4–2	4–4		3–3	2–0	1–2	2–1
Sunderland	0–1	1–1	1–6	1–4	1–2	2–3	2–2	1–1	2–1	3–2	3–0	2–1	1–2	2–0	3–0	1–1	0–0	3–3		1–1	2–0	0–2
Tottenham Hotspur	3–1	6–2	7–1	2–1	4–1	3–1	1–1	3–1	2–0	1–4	3–1	5–1	1–0	3–3	3–4	3–5	3–3	4–2	0–1		0–0	1–0
West Bromwich Albion	1–2	3–2	0–0	1–1	2–2	5–1	1–1	4–0	1–0	6–2	4–2	9–2	4–3	2–1	3–2	3–1	4–1	3–1	3–0	0–2		0–3
Wolverhampton Wanderers	1–2	2–1	5–1	3–1	6–1	2–1	2–1	2–0	3–2	5–1	1–1	3–3	3–1	3–1	2–0	1–0	2–0	4–3	5–0	4–0	1–1	

Updated to match(es) played on unknown. Source: Ian Laschke: Rothmans Book of Football League Records 1888–89 to 1978–79. Macdonald and Jane’s, London & Sydney, 1980.
Legend: Blue = home team win; Yellow = draw; Red = away team win.

=== Maps ===
Locations of the Football League First Division London teams 1957–1958
Locations of the Football League First Division 1957–1958 teams

== Second Division ==
Second Division
- Season: 1957–58
- Champions: West Ham United
- Promoted: West Ham United; Blackburn Rovers
- Relegated: Notts County; Doncaster Rovers
- Matches: 462
- Goals: 1,637 (3.54 per match)
- Top goalscorer: Tommy Johnston (43 goals)

Pos	Team	Pld	W	D	L	GF	GA	GAv	Pts	Qualification or relegation
1	West Ham United (C, P)	42	23	11	8	101	54	1.870	57	Promotion to the First Division
2	Blackburn Rovers (P)	42	22	12	8	93	57	1.632	56	Promotion to the First Division
3	Charlton Athletic	42	24	7	11	107	69	1.551	55	
4	Liverpool	42	22	10	10	79	54	1.463	54	
5	Fulham	42	20	12	10	97	59	1.644	52	
6	Sheffield United	42	21	10	11	75	50	1.500	52	
7	Middlesbrough	42	19	7	16	83	74	1.122	45	
8	Ipswich Town	42	16	12	14	68	69	0.986	44	
9	Huddersfield Town	42	14	16	12	63	66	0.955	44	
10	Bristol Rovers	42	17	8	17	85	80	1.063	42	
11	Stoke City	42	18	6	18	75	73	1.027	42	
12	Leyton Orient	42	18	5	19	77	79	0.975	41	
13	Grimsby Town	42	17	6	19	86	83	1.036	40	
14	Barnsley	42	14	12	16	70	74	0.946	40	
15	Cardiff City	42	14	9	19	63	77	0.818	37	
16	Derby County	42	14	8	20	60	81	0.741	36	
17	Bristol City	42	13	9	20	63	88	0.716	35	
18	Rotherham United	42	14	5	23	65	101	0.644	33	
19	Swansea Town	42	11	9	22	72	99	0.727	31	
20	Lincoln City	42	11	9	22	55	82	0.671	31	
21	Notts County (R)	42	12	6	24	44	80	0.550	30	Relegation to the Third Division
22	Doncaster Rovers (R)	42	8	11	23	56	88	0.636	27	Relegation to the Third Division

Rules for classification: 1) Points; 2) Goal average; 3) Goals scored
(C) Champions; (P) Promoted; (R) Relegated

=== Results ===
Home \ Away	BAR	BLB	BRI	BRR	CAR	CHA	DER	DON	FUL	GRI	HUD	IPS	LEY	LIN	LIV	MID	NTC	ROT	SHU	STK	SWA	WHU
Barnsley		0–2	4–1	2–2	1–1	4–1	3–0	1–1	1–0	3–3	2–3	5–1	3–0	1–3	2–1	1–1	1–1	3–0	0–2	1–2	1–0	1–0
Blackburn Rovers	3–1		5–0	2–0	4–0	1–1	3–1	3–2	1–1	3–0	1–1	0–0	4–1	0–1	3–3	3–3	3–0	5–0	1–0	1–0	2–2	2–1
Bristol City	5–0	0–0		3–2	2–0	1–2	2–1	2–2	0–5	3–2	1–3	1–0	2–2	4–0	1–2	0–0	3–1	0–1	1–4	2–1	1–2	1–1
Bristol Rovers	1–1	4–0	3–3		0–2	1–0	5–2	2–1	2–2	0–7	1–1	3–1	4–0	3–0	3–1	5–0	5–2	1–3	2–2	2–0	3–0	2–3
Cardiff City	7–0	4–3	2–3	0–2		0–3	3–2	3–1	3–0	1–3	1–0	1–1	1–1	3–2	6–1	0–2	2–0	2–2	0–0	5–2	0–0	0–3
Charlton Athletic	4–2	3–4	1–0	2–3	3–1		2–2	2–0	2–2	2–0	7–6	4–1	3–2	4–1	5–1	6–2	4–1	4–0	3–1	3–0	1–1	0–3
Derby County	1–4	0–3	5–2	2–1	0–2	1–3		1–0	3–3	1–0	2–4	2–2	2–0	3–2	2–1	2–1	2–1	3–4	2–0	0–0	1–0	2–3
Doncaster Rovers	1–1	1–5	2–1	3–2	0–1	1–2	1–2		1–6	3–3	0–3	1–1	2–0	1–3	1–1	3–2	4–0	3–2	2–2	0–1	3–0	1–2
Fulham	1–1	1–1	3–4	3–0	2–0	3–1	2–0	4–1		6–0	2–1	0–0	3–1	4–1	2–2	0–1	1–0	3–1	6–3	3–4	2–0	2–2
Grimsby Town	2–1	3–4	1–1	3–2	1–1	4–2	3–2	3–1	3–1		4–1	0–2	7–2	4–0	3–1	4–1	2–0	3–1	1–3	0–0	2–2	1–2
Huddersfield Town	0–5	2–1	0–0	0–0	1–1	3–3	0–0	2–2	0–3	1–0		3–0	2–0	0–1	2–1	1–0	3–0	1–3	1–1	1–0	2–2	3–1
Ipswich Town	3–0	2–1	4–2	3–2	3–1	1–4	2–2	2–0	1–1	3–2	4–0		5–3	1–1	3–1	1–1	2–1	1–2	1–0	1–3	0–1	2–1
Leyton Orient	2–1	5–1	4–0	1–3	4–2	3–2	1–1	2–0	1–3	5–1	3–1	2–0		1–0	1–0	4–0	2–2	6–2	0–1	0–2	5–1	1–4
Lincoln City	1–3	1–1	4–0	0–1	3–1	2–3	1–1	1–1	0–1	1–4	1–1	2–1	2–0		0–1	2–3	2–2	2–0	2–2	1–3	4–0	1–6
Liverpool	1–1	2–0	4–3	2–0	3–0	3–1	2–0	5–0	2–1	3–2	1–1	3–1	3–0	1–0		0–2	4–0	2–0	1–0	3–0	4–0	1–1
Middlesbrough	3–1	2–3	0–0	4–3	4–1	2–0	3–2	5–0	2–0	5–1	0–1	5–2	2–0	3–1	2–2		3–1	2–2	1–2	1–3	2–1	1–3
Notts County	2–3	1–1	0–1	0–0	5–2	2–1	1–0	0–5	1–5	2–0	1–1	0–3	0–1	1–0	0–2	2–0		1–0	1–0	1–2	2–4	1–0
Rotherham United	4–1	1–2	4–1	2–0	3–1	1–5	0–2	2–1	3–1	2–0	1–1	1–4	2–2	1–2	2–2	1–4	1–3		1–6	0–2	5–2	1–2
Sheffield United	0–0	4–2	0–3	2–0	3–0	0–3	0–1	3–0	1–1	3–1	3–2	1–1	0–2	4–0	1–1	3–2	1–0	2–0		3–0	2–2	2–1
Stoke City	3–1	2–4	3–0	3–5	3–0	2–2	2–1	0–0	1–2	4–1	1–1	5–1	1–3	1–1	1–2	4–1	0–1	4–1	2–3		6–2	1–4
Swansea Town	4–2	0–4	5–1	6–4	0–1	1–3	7–0	4–3	4–4	0–2	1–1	0–0	1–2	5–1	0–2	1–4	1–3	1–3	0–2	4–1		3–2
West Ham United	1–1	1–1	3–2	6–1	1–1	0–0	2–1	1–1	3–2	2–0	5–2	1–1	3–2	2–2	1–1	2–1	3–1	8–0	0–3	5–0	6–2	

Updated to match(es) played on unknown. Source: Ian Laschke: Rothmans Book of Football League Records 1888–89 to 1978–79. Macdonald and Jane’s, London & Sydney, 1980.
Legend: Blue = home team win; Yellow = draw; Red = away team win.

=== Maps ===
Locations of the Football League Second Division London teams 1957–1958
Locations of the Football League Second Division 1957–1958 teams

== Third Division North ==
Football League Third Division North
- Season: 1957–58
- Champions: Scunthorpe & Lindsey United (1st title)
- Failed re-election: none
- Matches: 552
- Goals: 1,783 (3.23 per match)
- Top goalscorer: Alf Ackerman (Carlisle United), 35

Pos	Team	Pld	W	D	L	GF	GA	GAv	Pts	Promotion or relegation
1	Scunthorpe & Lindsey United (C, P)	46	29	8	9	88	50	1.760	66	Promotion to the Second Division
2	Accrington Stanley	46	25	9	12	83	61	1.361	59	Qualification for the Third Division
3	Bradford City	46	21	15	10	73	49	1.490	57	Qualification for the Third Division
4	Bury	46	23	10	13	94	62	1.516	56	Qualification for the Third Division
5	Hull City	46	19	15	12	78	67	1.164	53	Qualification for the Third Division
6	Mansfield Town	46	22	8	16	100	92	1.087	52	Qualification for the Third Division
7	Halifax Town	46	20	11	15	83	69	1.203	51	Qualification for the Third Division
8	Chesterfield	46	18	15	13	71	69	1.029	51	Qualification for the Third Division
9	Stockport County	46	18	11	17	74	67	1.104	47	Qualification for the Third Division
10	Rochdale	46	19	8	19	79	67	1.179	46	Qualification for the Third Division
11	Tranmere Rovers	46	18	10	18	82	76	1.079	46	Qualification for the Third Division
12	Wrexham	46	17	12	17	61	63	0.968	46	Qualification for the Third Division
13	York City (R)	46	17	12	17	68	76	0.895	46	Relegation to the Fourth Division
14	Gateshead (R)	46	15	15	16	68	76	0.895	45	Relegation to the Fourth Division
15	Oldham Athletic (R)	46	14	17	15	72	84	0.857	45	Relegation to the Fourth Division
16	Carlisle United (R)	46	19	6	21	80	78	1.026	44	Relegation to the Fourth Division
17	Hartlepools United (R)	46	16	12	18	73	76	0.961	44	Relegation to the Fourth Division
18	Barrow (R)	46	13	15	18	66	74	0.892	41	Relegation to the Fourth Division
19	Workington (R)	46	14	13	19	72	81	0.889	41	Relegation to the Fourth Division
20	Darlington (R)	46	17	7	22	78	89	0.876	41	Relegation to the Fourth Division
21	Chester (R)	46	13	13	20	73	81	0.901	39	Relegation to the Fourth Division
22	Bradford (Park Avenue) (R)	46	13	11	22	68	95	0.716	37	Relegation to the Fourth Division
23	Southport (R)	46	11	6	29	52	88	0.591	28	Re-elected to the Fourth Division
24	Crewe Alexandra (R)	46	8	7	31	47	93	0.505	23	Re-elected to the Fourth Division

Source: rsssf.com
(C) Champions; (P) Promoted; (R) Relegated

=== Results ===
Home \ Away	ACC	BRW	BRA	BPA	BRY	CRL	CHE	CHF	CRE	DAR	GAT	HAL	HAR	HUL	MAN	OLD	ROC	SCU	SOU	STP	TRA	WRK	WRE	YOR
Accrington Stanley		3–2	2–2	5–2	3–0	3–2	1–2	0–4	2–0	0–0	3–0	2–1	1–2	3–0	4–1	1–1	3–2	2–1	2–2	3–2	2–1	3–0	2–1	3–0
Barrow	3–1		1–2	0–0	4–2	2–3	4–1	4–1	0–1	2–1	1–2	0–3	3–3	0–0	2–1	2–2	2–1	0–1	1–0	1–1	1–4	0–0	2–2	1–0
Bradford City	1–1	4–1		2–1	3–3	1–1	5–0	0–0	2–1	3–1	0–1	3–0	0–1	1–0	1–1	0–0	1–0	2–3	2–0	2–1	3–0	0–0	3–1	3–2
Bradford Park Avenue	1–3	1–1	0–0		1–4	4–1	3–0	2–0	3–1	4–1	2–2	0–2	2–3	4–4	0–2	1–3	2–2	1–2	3–5	1–0	1–0	3–3	2–0	0–2
Bury	1–1	4–1	1–0	1–0		3–0	1–2	1–0	2–0	5–0	4–1	1–0	3–3	1–1	0–2	4–0	4–1	2–1	4–1	1–1	8–2	3–0	3–0	4–1
Carlisle United	6–1	2–1	0–3	2–3	0–2		3–2	2–2	2–0	5–2	5–1	2–1	1–2	0–1	3–4	1–1	1–0	3–4	4–0	3–1	3–1	2–2	4–0	2–1
Chester	5–1	2–2	0–0	1–2	0–0	0–0		0–0	3–2	0–1	1–1	1–1	2–1	1–1	1–2	0–0	2–0	1–2	1–1	3–0	1–3	4–3	0–1	9–2
Chesterfield	1–0	4–3	0–1	1–1	1–1	1–3	2–1		1–1	2–0	5–3	1–1	2–1	0–0	1–4	2–1	2–2	1–1	0–0	2–1	2–1	3–0	3–2	2–0
Crewe Alexandra	4–1	1–4	2–2	3–0	0–1	0–0	0–3	1–2		2–2	2–2	1–2	2–1	1–2	1–0	0–2	0–0	0–2	3–2	1–2	0–4	0–3	2–0	3–4
Darlington	0–2	3–0	4–0	4–0	3–2	1–2	2–3	2–0	3–0		2–2	5–0	1–3	2–2	2–0	3–1	4–2	1–1	1–2	1–0	2–1	3–1	2–1	2–0
Gateshead	1–3	0–2	0–0	2–4	1–2	3–2	3–2	3–0	3–1	4–0		0–0	0–0	3–1	2–1	1–0	3–2	1–2	2–1	3–0	2–3	3–0	1–1	0–0
Halifax Town	0–2	3–1	3–2	2–0	1–2	5–0	2–1	3–2	2–0	1–0	4–1		3–0	2–2	4–0	4–0	4–1	0–1	4–1	0–0	1–1	2–2	0–0	2–1
Hartlepools United	1–1	4–1	2–0	0–0	2–1	0–1	2–1	0–2	1–1	5–1	2–2	5–0		5–1	2–0	4–1	1–3	1–2	2–1	1–2	1–1	1–0	1–2	2–2
Hull City	1–0	1–1	1–3	3–3	2–1	4–0	3–0	1–0	1–0	2–1	1–1	5–2	1–1		1–1	9–0	2–1	2–0	3–2	1–0	0–0	3–2	2–0	0–1
Mansfield Town	0–2	4–2	5–2	2–1	6–4	2–0	3–1	1–1	2–1	4–2	3–0	2–1	5–1	1–3		4–4	2–4	3–5	3–0	2–2	4–1	6–3	2–1	2–1
Oldham Athletic	0–3	1–1	1–1	4–2	1–3	1–0	5–1	2–1	1–0	2–2	0–0	2–4	4–0	1–1	1–1		0–0	2–1	3–2	2–4	1–0	4–1	4–1	2–3
Rochdale	3–0	1–1	0–2	1–2	1–1	1–0	1–1	3–4	3–0	5–4	0–0	5–1	7–0	2–1	3–0	1–3		1–4	2–0	3–0	2–0	1–0	2–0	2–1
Scunthorpe & Lindsey United	1–0	1–0	0–2	6–2	1–0	3–1	2–1	1–1	3–2	5–0	2–1	1–1	2–0	2–0	3–3	1–1	2–0		1–0	4–0	1–0	2–2	1–0	1–2
Southport	3–3	0–4	0–2	2–1	2–2	2–0	2–4	5–2	2–0	0–3	1–0	0–3	0–0	1–2	4–1	2–1	0–2	1–2		1–0	0–3	0–1	1–3	0–1
Stockport County	0–0	2–0	0–4	3–0	4–0	4–1	2–2	4–1	5–1	4–1	5–1	4–2	2–1	1–0	3–3	3–0	0–3	2–1	1–2		2–1	0–2	1–1	2–1
Tranmere Rovers	0–1	1–1	4–1	5–0	1–1	0–1	2–2	1–2	5–2	2–1	2–1	2–0	3–2	4–4	1–2	1–1	3–1	1–4	2–1	2–2		1–0	2–1	6–1
Workington	0–1	0–1	1–1	1–2	3–0	2–1	5–3	0–2	3–2	2–2	1–1	4–4	1–0	3–2	4–0	4–2	1–2	3–2	2–0	1–1	1–2		4–2	0–0
Wrexham	1–0	0–0	1–1	1–1	2–0	1–0	1–0	2–2	0–1	2–0	1–2	2–1	3–1	6–0	4–2	2–2	2–0	1–0	1–0	1–0	2–2	1–1		2–2
York City	0–3	0–0	2–0	3–0	2–1	0–5	1–2	3–3	3–1	3–0	2–2	1–1	2–2	3–1	3–1	2–2	1–0	0–0	1–0	0–0	4–0	3–0	1–2	

Updated to match(es) played on unknown. Source: Ian Laschke: Rothmans Book of Football League Records 1888–89 to 1978–79. Macdonald and Jane’s, London & Sydney, 1980.
Legend: Blue = home team win; Yellow = draw; Red = away team win.

=== Maps ===
Locations of the Football League Third Division North teams 1957–1958

== Third Division South ==
Football League Third Division South
- Season: 1957–58
- Champions: Brighton & Hove Albion (1st title)
- Failed re-election: none
- Matches: 552
- Goals: 1,701 (3.08 per match)
- Top goalscorer: Derek Reeves (Southampton), Sammy McCrory (Southend United), 31

Pos	Team	Pld	W	D	L	GF	GA	GAv	Pts	Promotion or relegation
1	Brighton & Hove Albion (C, P)	46	24	12	10	88	64	1.375	60	Promotion to the Second Division
2	Brentford	46	24	10	12	82	56	1.464	58	Qualification for the Third Division
3	Plymouth Argyle	46	25	8	13	67	48	1.396	58	Qualification for the Third Division
4	Swindon Town	46	21	15	10	79	50	1.580	57	Qualification for the Third Division
5	Reading	46	21	13	12	79	51	1.549	55	Qualification for the Third Division
6	Southampton	46	22	10	14	112	72	1.556	54	Qualification for the Third Division
7	Southend United	46	21	12	13	90	58	1.552	54	Qualification for the Third Division
8	Norwich City	46	19	15	12	75	70	1.071	53	Qualification for the Third Division
9	Bournemouth & Boscombe Athletic	46	21	9	16	81	74	1.095	51	Qualification for the Third Division
10	Queens Park Rangers	46	18	14	14	64	65	0.985	50	Qualification for the Third Division
11	Newport County	46	17	14	15	73	67	1.090	48	Qualification for the Third Division
12	Colchester United	46	17	13	16	77	79	0.975	47	Qualification for the Third Division
13	Northampton Town (R)	46	19	6	21	87	79	1.101	44	Relegation to the Fourth Division
14	Crystal Palace (R)	46	15	13	18	70	72	0.972	43	Relegation to the Fourth Division
15	Port Vale (R)	46	16	10	20	67	58	1.155	42	Relegation to the Fourth Division
16	Watford (R)	46	13	16	17	59	77	0.766	42	Relegation to the Fourth Division
17	Shrewsbury Town (R)	46	15	10	21	49	71	0.690	40	Relegation to the Fourth Division
18	Aldershot (R)	46	12	16	18	59	89	0.663	40	Relegation to the Fourth Division
19	Coventry City (R)	46	13	13	20	61	81	0.753	39	Relegation to the Fourth Division
20	Walsall (R)	46	14	9	23	61	75	0.813	37	Relegation to the Fourth Division
21	Torquay United (R)	46	11	13	22	49	74	0.662	35	Relegation to the Fourth Division
22	Gillingham (R)	46	13	9	24	52	81	0.642	35	Relegation to the Fourth Division
23	Millwall (R)	46	11	9	26	63	91	0.692	31	Re-elected to the Fourth Division
24	Exeter City (R)	46	11	9	26	57	99	0.576	31	Re-elected to the Fourth Division

(C) Champions; (P) Promoted; (R) Relegated

=== Results ===
Home \ Away	ALD	B&BA	BRE	B&HA	COL	COV	CRY	EXE	GIL	MIL	NPC	NOR	NWC	PLY	PTV	QPR	REA	SHR	SOU	STD	SWI	TOR	WAL	WAT
Aldershot		0–0	0–2	2–3	2–1	1–1	4–1	2–2	2–0	2–2	2–1	0–0	2–1	3–3	0–1	1–1	1–0	0–1	1–5	0–2	2–1	1–1	1–3	2–2
Bournemouth & Boscombe Athletic	5–1		1–0	1–3	1–1	0–0	3–1	2–1	2–1	4–0	4–3	1–1	3–1	0–0	3–1	4–1	4–1	3–1	5–2	2–1	1–1	2–0	1–2	2–1
Brentford	4–2	4–2		1–0	3–3	1–3	0–3	1–0	1–0	4–1	2–1	7–1	7–1	2–0	4–1	1–1	2–1	2–0	0–0	4–2	0–0	0–1	2–1	0–0
Brighton & Hove Albion	0–1	2–1	1–1		5–2	3–0	3–2	2–2	5–2	4–2	5–3	1–4	0–1	3–2	0–0	1–1	1–2	2–1	1–1	3–1	1–0	1–1	2–0	6–0
Colchester United	1–1	3–2	1–1	1–2		4–1	1–1	3–0	3–2	2–1	1–1	1–0	1–2	1–2	2–1	2–1	1–3	3–0	4–2	1–0	1–3	3–0	1–1	4–0
Coventry City	6–0	0–3	0–0	2–2	1–0		2–2	6–1	1–1	1–4	1–2	1–1	2–1	1–1	1–0	1–1	1–0	5–0	0–0	1–0	0–1	2–1	4–1	2–2
Crystal Palace	1–1	3–0	2–1	2–4	1–1	2–0		2–0	3–0	0–1	2–2	1–3	0–3	3–0	1–0	2–3	2–2	3–0	1–4	2–0	4–1	1–1	4–1	4–2
Exeter City	3–0	1–2	3–5	2–0	4–3	1–0	0–1		1–3	2–0	0–2	0–1	2–2	4–2	1–0	0–0	1–1	2–1	2–2	0–5	0–1	5–1	2–1	1–2
Gillingham	1–1	1–1	3–2	0–1	2–3	3–2	3–0	1–1		1–0	0–1	1–2	1–0	1–0	0–2	1–1	2–1	1–3	2–1	2–0	2–1	1–0	3–0	1–1
Millwall	3–3	0–2	0–1	2–2	1–4	4–1	3–0	3–0	3–1		1–2	0–0	2–2	0–1	2–1	5–0	0–0	1–3	1–2	1–2	1–1	1–2	1–3	2–3
Newport County	3–2	3–1	1–2	1–2	2–2	2–2	0–0	0–0	5–0	1–2		0–1	1–0	0–2	2–1	4–2	0–0	2–0	1–1	1–0	4–1	3–2	2–0	2–1
Northampton Town	0–0	4–0	3–1	2–4	4–1	4–0	1–2	9–0	3–1	7–2	0–3		0–1	5–0	3–2	1–5	1–2	2–0	1–3	1–3	3–0	1–0	3–0	2–3
Norwich City	1–3	2–2	3–2	0–0	1–1	1–1	3–2	3–2	2–0	1–1	5–2	2–2		1–0	3–0	2–0	2–2	2–0	0–2	0–2	1–1	3–1	2–1	1–1
Plymouth Argyle	4–2	3–1	0–0	2–1	1–1	4–0	1–0	1–0	2–1	1–0	1–0	3–0	0–1		1–0	3–1	1–0	2–2	4–0	2–3	2–2	1–0	2–1	2–1
Port Vale	6–1	2–3	0–1	2–2	2–0	0–1	4–0	3–2	2–0	1–1	2–2	3–0	2–2	0–0		2–1	1–2	0–0	4–0	1–3	3–1	2–1	2–1	5–0
Queens Park Rangers	0–1	3–0	1–0	0–1	1–0	3–0	4–2	1–1	1–1	3–0	1–1	1–0	1–1	1–0	2–1		3–0	3–0	3–2	1–1	2–1	1–1	1–0	3–0
Reading	3–0	2–0	1–2	1–1	7–0	3–1	2–2	2–0	4–0	4–1	1–0	5–2	1–2	1–3	3–0	3–0		2–2	1–0	1–1	0–4	1–0	3–1	1–1
Shrewsbury Town	5–1	0–4	0–2	2–0	0–0	1–3	0–0	1–0	2–1	0–1	1–1	3–1	0–0	2–0	1–0	2–1	0–2		1–3	1–1	1–3	3–0	2–0	1–1
Southampton	2–2	7–0	4–2	5–0	3–2	7–1	2–1	6–0	5–1	3–2	2–1	2–1	7–3	0–1	0–3	5–0	0–1	2–2		2–2	1–3	4–2	4–1	5–0
Southend United	1–2	2–0	0–0	0–2	2–3	5–1	1–1	2–0	2–0	2–0	1–1	6–3	5–2	2–1	1–1	6–0	2–1	5–1	3–2		2–3	0–0	4–1	2–1
Swindon Town	3–0	1–0	4–1	2–2	4–0	2–1	0–0	5–1	1–1	3–0	4–0	5–1	1–2	1–0	0–0	1–1	1–1	1–0	1–0	2–1		3–1	2–3	0–0
Torquay United	2–1	3–1	0–1	2–0	1–3	1–0	1–1	1–3	3–2	2–3	2–2	1–0	1–1	0–2	1–1	3–1	1–4	0–2	1–1	2–2	2–2		2–1	1–0
Walsall	0–0	3–1	0–2	2–3	3–0	4–1	2–1	3–0	1–1	4–2	3–0	2–1	2–1	0–2	3–0	1–2	0–0	0–1	1–1	1–1	1–1	0–0		1–3
Watford	1–3	1–1	4–1	0–1	1–1	1–0	2–1	5–4	3–0	3–0	2–2	0–2	1–4	0–2	0–2	0–0	1–1	3–0	3–0	1–1	0–0	1–0	1–1	

Updated to match(es) played on unknown. Source: Ian Laschke: Rothmans Book of Football League Records 1888–89 to 1978–79. Macdonald and Jane’s, London & Sydney, 1980.
Legend: Blue = home team win; Yellow = draw; Red = away team win.

=== Maps ===
Locations of the Football League Third Division South London teams 1957–1958
Locations of the Football League Third Division South teams 1957–1958

== Attendances ==
=== First Division ===
#	Football club	Home games	Average attendance
1	Manchester United	21	46,073
2	Tottenham Hotspur	21	42,942
3	Arsenal FC	21	39,835
4	Everton FC	21	39,157
5	Chelsea FC	21	38,430
6	Wolverhampton Wanderers	21	37,317
7	Newcastle United	21	36,241
8	Sunderland AFC	21	36,146
9	Manchester City	21	32,765
10	West Bromwich Albion	21	32,419
11	Leicester City	21	31,359
12	Nottingham Forest	21	31,305
13	Birmingham City	21	29,553
14	Aston Villa	21	28,842
15	Portsmouth FC	21	28,499
16	Preston North End	21	25,012
17	Leeds United	21	24,920
18	Sheffield Wednesday	21	22,757
19	Burnley FC	21	22,251
20	Bolton Wanderers	21	22,029
21	Blackpool FC	21	21,406
22	Luton Town	21	18,419

=== Second Division ===
#	Football club	Home games	Average attendance
1	Liverpool FC	21	38,476
2	West Ham United	21	24,854
3	Middlesbrough FC	21	24,398
4	Fulham FC	21	24,234
5	Blackburn Rovers	21	22,705
6	Charlton Athletic	21	22,221
7	Bristol City	21	22,058
8	Bristol Rovers	21	20,604
9	Stoke City	21	20,511
10	Derby County	21	19,830
11	Sheffield United	21	19,243
12	Ipswich Town	21	18,285
13	Cardiff City	21	15,845
14	Swansea Town	21	15,711
15	Leyton Orient	21	14,842
16	Notts County	21	14,470
17	Grimsby Town	21	14,166
18	Huddersfield Town	21	14,152
19	Barnsley FC	21	13,969
20	Doncaster Rovers	21	11,129
21	Rotherham United	21	10,179
22	Lincoln City	21	10,147

== See also ==
- 1957-58 in English football
