= Malcolm Newlands =

Scottish footballer (1925–1996)

Personal information
- Full name: Malcolm Newlands
- Date of birth: 28 March 1925
- Place of birth: Wishaw, Scotland
- Date of death: 10 February 1996 (aged 70)
- Place of death: Motherwell, Scotland
- Position: Goalkeeper

Youth career
- Carluke Rovers

Senior career*
Years	Team	Apps	(Gls)
1946–1948	St Mirren	31	(0)
1948–1952	Preston North End	80	(0)
1952–1960	Workington	250	(0)
Total		361	(0)
- * Club domestic league appearances and goals

Malcolm Newlands (28 March 1925 – 10 February 1996) was a Scottish professional footballer who played as a goalkeeper.

== Career ==
Born in Wishaw, Newlands played for Carluke Rovers, St Mirren, Preston North End and Workington.
