= Robert Cornthwaite =

Robert Cornthwaite may refer to:

- Robert Cornthwaite (bishop) (1818–1890), English prelate of Roman Catholic Church
- Robert Cornthwaite (actor) (1917–2006), American film and TV character performer
- Robert Cornthwaite (soccer) (born 1985), English-Australian centre-back

== See also ==
- Robert Cornthwaite Streatfeild (1894–1976), English priest who served as Dean of Nassau, Bahamas
