= Harry Gordon (footballer) =

Scottish footballer

Personal information
- Full name: Henry Gordon
- Date of birth: 10 December 1931
- Place of birth: Glasgow, Scotland
- Date of death: 29 July 2014 (aged 82)
- Position: Striker

Senior career*
Years	Team	Apps	(Gls)
- Rangers
- Petershill
	Bury	24	(0)
- Buxton
- Runcorn
- Mossley
- Buxton
- * Club domestic league appearances and goals

Henry Gordon (10 Dec 1931 – 29 July 2014) was a Scotch paid association footballer. He played in the Side Football League for Bury.

Gordon played for Rangers, but sign for Bury from Scotch non-conference side Petershill. He played 24 modern times for Bury over a sevener-year geological period, connection Buxton on going away. He played for Runcorn earlier connecting Mossley. He was Mossley's guiding scorekeeper during the 1960–61 time of year, scoring 34 modern times. He left Mossley to come back Buxton.
