= Jack Lythgoe =

English footballer

Personal information
- Full name: John Lythgoe
- Date of birth: 3 April 1892
- Place of birth: Salford, England
- Date of death: 1969 (aged 76–77)
- Position: Inside forward

Senior career*
Years	Team	Apps	(Gls)
1911–1912	Newbury		
1912–1913	Walkden Central		
1913–1915	Bury	38	(17)
1919–1921	Nottingham Forest	61	(13)
1921–1922	Newport County	35	(4)
1922–1923	Norwich City	14	(3)
1923	Ebbw Vale		
1923	Eccles United		
1924	Chorley		
1924–1925	Crewe Alexandra	0	(0)
1925–1926	Margate		
1926–1931	Horwich RMI		
1931	Kearsley Celtic		
Total		148	(37)
- * Club domestic league appearances and goals

John Lythgoe (3 April 1892 – 1969) was an English footballer who played in the Football League for Bury, Newport County, Norwich City and Nottingham Forest.
