= Walter Kelly (footballer) =

Scottish footballer (1929–1993)

Personal information
- Full name: Walter Muir Kelly
- Date of birth: 15 April 1929
- Place of birth: Cowdenbeath, Scotland
- Date of death: 6 February 1993 (aged 63)
- Place of death: Dunfermline, Scotland
- Position: Centre forward

Youth career
- Inverkeithing United
- Raith Athletic
- Hill of Beath Hawthorn

Senior career*
Years	Team	Apps	(Gls)
1946–1951	Raith Rovers	13	(1)
1952–1957	Bury	160	(76)
1957–1958	Doncaster Rovers	29	(6)
1958–1959	Stockport County	47	(12)
1959–1961	Chester	56	(24)
- Hyde United
Total		305	(119)
- * Club domestic league appearances and goals

Walter Muir Kelly (15 April 1929 – 16 February 1993) was a Scottish footballer who played as a centre forward in the Football League for Bury, Doncaster Rovers, Stockport County and Chester, and for Raith Rovers in the Scottish Football League.

His elder brother Willie Kelly was also a professional footballer; their father and two more brothers played at a lower level in Fife.
