= John Good (footballer) =

English footballer (1933–2005)

Personal information
- Full name: John Russell Good
- Date of birth: 29 January 1933
- Place of birth: Portsmouth, England
- Date of death: 23 March 2005 (aged 72)
- Place of death: Great Budworth, England
- Position: Winger

Senior career*
Years	Team	Apps	(Gls)
1955–1956	Tranmere Rovers	5	(0)
- * Club domestic league appearances and goals

John Russell Good (29 January 1933 – 23 March 2005) was an English footballer, who played as a winger in the Football League for Tranmere Rovers.
