= Charlie Sneddon =

Scottish footballer (1930–1992)

Personal information
- Date of birth: 10 June 1930
- Place of birth: Bo'ness, Scotland
- Date of death: 1992 (aged 62)
- Place of death: Lancashire, England
- Position: Centre half

Youth career
- Forth Wanderers

Senior career*
Years	Team	Apps	(Gls)
1947–1953	Stenhousemuir	76	(2)
1953–1961	Accrington Stanley	213	(3)
- Padiham
Total		289	(5)
- * Club domestic league appearances and goals

Charles Sneddon (10 June 1930 – 1992) was a Scottish professional footballer who played as a centre half.

== Career ==
Born in Bo'ness, Sneddon played for Forth Wanderers, Stenhousemuir, Accrington Stanley and Padiham.
