= Peter Tilley =

Association footballer from Northern Ireland

Personal information
- Date of birth: 13 January 1930
- Place of birth: Lurgan, Northern Ireland
- Date of death: 11 August 2008 (aged 78)
- Position: Wing half

Senior career*
Years	Team	Apps	(Gls)
- Mossley
- Witton Albion
1952–1953	Arsenal	102	(14)
1953–1958	Bury	86	(12)
1958–1963	Halifax Town	184	(17)
- Mossley
Total		271	(29)
- * Club domestic league appearances and goals

Peter Tilley (13 January 1930 – 11 August 2008) was a Northern Irish professional footballer who played as a wing half.

== Career ==
Born in Lurgan, Tilley began his career in non-league football with Mossley and Witton Albion. He later played in the Football League for Arsenal, Bury and Halifax Town, making a total of 271 appearances.
