= George Raynor =

English footballer and manager

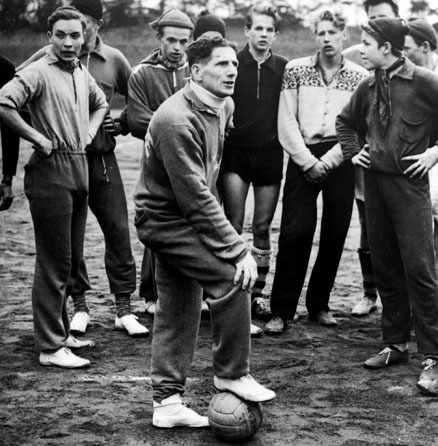
- George Raynor

Personal information
- Full name: George Sidney Raynor
- Date of birth: 13 January 1907
- Place of birth: Hoyland Common, England
- Date of death: 7 November 1985 (aged 78)
- Height: 5 ft 5 in (1.65 m)
- Position: Outside right

Youth career
- Elsecar Bible Class
- Mexborough Athletic

Senior career*
| Years | Team | Apps | (Gls) |
| 1929–1930 | Wombwell | | |
| 1930–1931 | Sheffield United | | |
| 1932–1933 | Mansfield Town | | |
| 1933–1935 | Rotherham United | | |
| 1935–1938 | Bury | | |
| 1938–1939 | Aldershot | | |

Managerial career
- 1943–1945: Iraq XI
- 1945–1946: Aldershot Reserves
- 1946–1954: Sweden
- 1947–1948: GAIS
- 1948–1952: AIK
- 1952–1954: Åtvidaberg
- 1954: Juventus
- 1954–1955: Lazio
- 1956: Coventry City
- 1956–1958: Sweden
- 1958–1960: Skegness Town
- 1960: Djurgården
- 1961: Sweden
- 1967–1968: Doncaster Rovers
- * Club domestic league appearances and goals

George Sidney Raynor (13 January 1907 – 7 November 1985) was an English professional footballer and manager. One of his greatest achievements was taking the Sweden men's national football team to a World Cup final, and he also managed them to an Olympic gold medal. Before the 1966 FIFA World Cup, he was the only Englishman to take a national team to a final of a World Cup.

His World Cup campaign with Sweden is the best result ever for a non-national manager in the history of the tournament, along with Austrian Ernst Happel's second place with Netherlands in 1978, twenty years after Raynor's.

== Playing career ==
Raynor first played football in the non-Leagues for Elsecar Bible Class, Mexborough Athletic and Wombwell. When he did sign professional forms, Raynor's career took him only on an uninspired jaunt around the Football League. His first professional club was Sheffield United whom he joined in 1930, making only one first team appearance in the two years he was with the club. Between 1932 and 1939, he played for four different League clubs, the last of these (Aldershot) in the truncated season before the start of the War. He signed up as a physical training instructor (PTI) in 1939 in order to train soldiers in the British Army. The Football Association had requested that all professional footballers become PTIs if they were not inclined to see active service. Raynor was posted to Iraq and, whilst in the course of working as a training instructor in Baghdad, he helped a fellow teacher club together a group of students into a team which toured the neighbouring states as a representative of Iraq. His work in Iraq came to the notice of the Secretary of the FA Stanley Rous. Thereafter, as Brian Glanville notes (with some poetic licence) in his The Story of the World Cup for The Sunday Times (1973), "the FA whisked him in 1946 from reserve team trainer at Aldershot to the team managership of Sweden".

During 1939, he was a 'guest' WW2 player with Aldershot, Bournemouth, Bury, Clapton Orient with one appearance, Crystal Palace and Hull City. Source: Neilson N. Kaufman, historian Leyton Orient.

== Sweden manager ==
Raynor was an irascible, indefatigable figure, characteristics that possibly aligned him more to Sweden than they ever would in conservative England; accordingly, with his insights into club management coming to the fore, Sweden quickly developed into a force. Under his tutelage, Sweden gave England a scare before losing 4–2 at Highbury in 1947.

=== 1948 Olympic Games ===
The following year, Sweden won the 1948 Olympic Games title defeating Yugoslavia 3–1 in the final, in front of 60,000 at Wembley. This was after having surpassed Austria, Denmark and South Korea in the earlier stages. At that stage, Raynor was assisted by Putte Kock. They had assessed the team and decided that Nils Liedholm and Kjell Rosén could work effectively as defensive midfielders. The team had a core of players who would go on to play in Italy's Serie A championship. Gunnar Gren, Gunnar Nordahl and Liedholm (later called Gre-No-Li) formed an inventive striking force and each was picked up by Italian scouts following the gold-medal victory. Raynor was the last English manager to lead a team to Olympic Gold until Bev Priestman did so for the Canada women's national soccer team at the Tokyo 2020 Olympics.

=== 1950 World Cup ===
Despite losing several key players and facing domestic restrictions that prevented professionals from playing for the national team, Raynor still qualified the side for the 1950 FIFA World Cup in Brazil. There the team defeated Italy and finished in third place, losing 3–2 to the eventual champions, Uruguay, after previously losing 7–1 to Brazil.

=== 1952 Olympic Games ===
Raynor was still in charge of the national side for their Bronze medal performance at the 1952 Olympic Games in Helsinki and coached the national side during a two-game tour in late Autumn 1953. One of those games included an international against Hungary in Budapest on 15 November. Raynor is reputed to have said: "If we win, I'll paint [the Stalin statue's] moustache red." The game finished 2–2 (Kurt Hamrin, the Swedish right-winger, hitting the cross-bar in the final minute), against the brilliant Hungarian Golden Team, who had remained undefeated for over four years. On the journey back to Sweden, Raynor met Walter Winterbottom in Vienna and explained to him how to play the Hungarians, using man-to-man marking to cut out the threat of Nándor Hidegkuti. Winterbottom did not follow the advice and this, in part, led to England's losing their home record against Hungary at Wembley on 25 November 1953

=== 1958 World Cup ===
By that stage, the Swedish FA had decided to allow professionalism in domestic football, but there was still the need to go cap in hand to the Italian clubs in order to confirm the selection of Kurt Hamrin (from Padova) and Liedholm (at A.C. Milan) and there was still a need to convince the Swedish public of the need to play 'foreigners' in the national side. Raynor said: "It would have been impossible for us to meet world-class opposition without such performers as Liedholm, Gren, Hamrin and Skoglund. Some people thought it wrong to play these '[Italians' as the side was not representative of Swedish football. Perhaps it wasn't, but it was representative of the footballers Sweden produced."

Raynor managed Sweden to the final against Brazil; a 3–1 win against 1954 FIFA World Champions West Germany confirmed their quality. He famously said that if Sweden get the first goal in the Final 'Brazil would panic all over the show'. Up to that stage the Brazilians had yet to go a goal down and when they were held, particularly by the Welsh in the quarter-final, they had struggled to unlock the defence. As it happened the Swedes did score first; Liedholm scoring after four minutes, but Brazil rode the set-back and both Pelé and Vavá scored a brace in a 5–2 victory for the South Americans. The runners-up place is still the greatest achievement ever for Sweden in a major football competition.

== Club manager ==
Raynor drifted back and forth into club management throughout this time with AIK in Stockholm (from 1948 to 1951), Lazio in Rome (during the 1954–55 season) and Coventry City in England (for five months in 1956), but was back as national manager for the 1958 FIFA World Cup held in Sweden. During his time at Coventry, he was asked to be the trainer for the Third Division South representative team in 1956–57.

== Later career ==
Nine years after these triumphs, Raynor was made redundant after a seven-month stint managing Doncaster Rovers in the English Fourth Division. But perhaps nothing illustrates the contrast between Raynor's international profile and his English one better than the fact that during his career he managed Lazio and later found work as a manager with Skegness Town.

He published a book in 1960 called Football Ambassador at Large.

== Honours ==
=== Manager ===
Sweden

- FIFA World Cup
  - (silver) Runners-up: 1958
  - (bronze) Third place: 1950
- Olympic Games
  - (gold) Champions: 1948
  - (bronze) Third place: 1952

AIK

- Svenska Cupen: 1949, 1950

Individual

- Swedish Football Hall of Fame: Inducted, 2006
