= Doug Clarke (English footballer) =

English footballer (1934–2019)

Personal information
- Full name: Douglas Clarke
- Date of birth: 19 January 1934
- Place of birth: Bolton, England
- Date of death: 11 August 2019 (aged 85)
- Place of death: Torquay, England
- Position: Winger

Youth career
- 1950–1952: Bolton Wanderers

Senior career*
| Years | Team | Apps | (Gls) |
| 1952 | Darwen | | |
| 1952–1955 | Bury | 37 | (15) |
| 1955–1965 | Hull City | 368 | (79) |
| 1965–1968 | Torquay United | 119 | (21) |
| 1968–1969 | Bath City | | |
| 1969–1970 | Bridgwater Town | | |
| Total | | 524 | (115) |
- * Club domestic league appearances and goals

Douglas Clarke (19 January 1934 – 11 August 2019) was an English footballer who played for Darwen, Bury, Hull City, Torquay United, Bath City, and Bridgwater Town.
