= John Ritson =

English footballer

Personal information
- Date of birth: 6 September 1949 (age 77)
- Place of birth: Liverpool, England
- Position: Defender

Senior career*
Years	Team	Apps	(Gls)
1967–1978	Bolton Wanderers	324	(9)
1978–1980	Bury	41	(2)
1980–1981	Southport	10	(1)
Total		375	(12)
- * Club domestic league appearances and goals

John Ritson (born 6 September 1949) is an English born former professional footballer, who played as a defender in the Football League in the 1960s and 1970s, most notably for Bolton Wanderers.

He joined the club as an apprentice and made his league debut in the 1967-68 season. He went on to play 324 league matches for the club, and was a member of the promotion-winning team of 1977-78.

However, following a contractual dispute he moved to Bury in the late 1970s and made over 40 league appearances for them, before moving into non-league football with Southport. Ritson made 12 appearances for Southport in 1980–81.

Following the end of his playing career, he ran a newsagents, and as of 2004 he was running his own builder's firm.
