= Harry Dutton (footballer) =

English footballer (1898–1972)

Personal information
- Full name: Henry Robert Dutton
- Date of birth: 16 January 1898
- Place of birth: Edmonton, London, England
- Date of death: 1972 (aged 73–74)
- Place of death: Enfield, England
- Height: 5 ft 7 in (1.70 m)
- Position: Left half

Senior career*
Years	Team	Apps	(Gls)
19??–1921	Tufnell Park		
1921–1927	West Bromwich Albion	57	(2)
1927–1929	Bury	37	(1)
1929–1933	Brighton & Hove Albion	93	(4)
1933–19??	Shoreham		
- * Club domestic league appearances and goals

Henry Robert Dutton (16 January 1898 – 1972) was an English professional footballer who made 187 Football League appearances playing as a left half for West Bromwich Albion, Bury and Brighton & Hove Albion.

== Life and career ==
Dutton was born in Edmonton, which was then in Middlesex. He played for Isthmian League club Tufnell Park before signing for West Bromwich Albion in 1921, but played in only 57 First Division matches in six seasons. He moved on to another First Division club, Bury, where he made 37 league appearances in two-and-a-half seasons, and then signed for Brighton & Hove Albion. At Third Division South level, he was a first-team regular, with 104 appearances in all competitions before retiring from professional football in 1933. He went on to keep a pub in Brighton, and died in Enfield in 1972.
