= Doug Fletcher =

English footballer

Personal information
- Full name: Douglas Fletcher
- Date of birth: 17 September 1930
- Place of birth: Sheffield, England
- Position: Inside forward

Youth career
- –: Hillsborough B.C.

Senior career*
Years	Team	Apps	(Gls)
1948–1951	Sheffield Wednesday	4	(0)
1951–1956	Bury	61	(17)
1956–1958	Scunthorpe United	54	(26)
1958–1959	Darlington	43	(13)
1959–1960	Halifax Town	20	(4)
1960–19??	Bath City		
- * Club domestic league appearances and goals

Douglas Fletcher (born 17 September 1930) is an English former footballer who scored 60 goals from 188 appearances in the Football League playing as an inside forward for Sheffield Wednesday, Bury, Scunthorpe United, Darlington and Halifax Town. He also scored 8 goals from 17 appearances for Southern League club Bath City.
