= Tommy Neill (footballer) =

Scottish footballer

Personal information
- Full name: Thomas Kerr Neill
- Date of birth: 3 October 1930
- Place of birth: Methil, Fife, Scotland
- Date of death: 15 July 1996 (aged 66)
- Place of death: Bolton
- Position: Wing half

Senior career*
Years	Team	Apps	(Gls)
1950–1956	Bolton Wanderers	42	(3)
1956–1960	Bury	90	(9)
1960–1963	Tranmere Rovers	79	(2)
1963–1964	Wigan Athletic	35	(5)
- * Club domestic league appearances and goals

Tommy Neill (3 October 1930 – 15 July 1996) was a Scottish footballer who played as a wing half in the Football League for Bolton Wanderers, Bury and Tranmere Rovers. He also spent one season at Wigan Athletic in the Cheshire League, playing 35 games and scoring five goals.
