= Johnny Simm =

English footballer (1929–2018)

Personal information
- Date of birth: 24 November 1929
- Place of birth: Ashton-in-Makerfield, England
- Date of death: 12 April 2018 (aged 88)
- Position: Winger

Senior career*
Years	Team	Apps	(Gls)
1947–1951	Bolton Wanderers	1	(0)
1951–1955	Bury	47	(8)
1955–1959	Bradford City	95	(22)
Total		143	(30)
- * Club domestic league appearances and goals

John Simm (24 November 1929 – 12 April 2018) was an English professional footballer who played as a winger, making 143 appearances in the Football League for Bolton Wanderers, Bury and Bradford City.
