= Don Wilson (footballer, born 1930) =

English footballer and manager

Personal information
- Full name: Donald Wilson
- Date of birth: 4 June 1930
- Place of birth: Heywood, England
- Date of death: 12 October 2003 (aged 73)
- Place of death: Bury, England
- Position: Full back

Senior career*
Years	Team	Apps	(Gls)
1952–1962	Bury	63	(1)
1962–1967	Mossley		

Managerial career
- 1962–1972: Mossley
- 1973–1974: Radcliffe Borough
- Stalybridge Celtic
- * Club domestic league appearances and goals

Donald Wilson (4 June 1930 – 12 October 2003) was an English football player and manager, who played in the Football League for Bury.
