= Tom Cahill (footballer, born 1931) =

Scottish footballer

Personal information
- Full name: Thomas Cahill
- Date of birth: 14 June 1931
- Place of birth: Glasgow, Scotland
- Date of death: 27 January 2003 (aged 71)
- Place of death: Spain
- Position: Left back

Youth career
- Vale of Leven

Senior career*
Years	Team	Apps	(Gls)
1951–1955	Newcastle United	4	(0)
1955–1965	Barrow	283	(3)
Total		287	(3)
- * Club domestic league appearances and goals

Thomas Cahill (14 June 1931 – 27 January 2003) was a Scottish professional footballer who played as a left back.

== Career ==
Born in Glasgow, Cahill played for Vale of Leven, Newcastle United and Barrow.
