= George Brooks (footballer, born 1892) =

English footballer

Personal information
- Full name: George Brooks
- Date of birth: 2 January 1892
- Place of birth: Edenfield, England
- Date of death: 1966 (aged 73–74)
- Height: 5 ft 9 in (1.75 m)
- Position: Wing half

Senior career*
Years	Team	Apps	(Gls)
1909–1910	Tottington		
1910–1911	Ramsbottom		
1911–1926	Bury	71	(3)
Total		71	(3)
- * Club domestic league appearances and goals

George Brooks (2 January 1892 – 1966) was an English footballer who played in the Football League for Bury.
