= Jack Acquroff =

English footballer

Personal information
- Full name: John Acquroff
- Date of birth: 9 September 1911
- Place of birth: Chelsea, London, England
- Date of death: November 1987 (aged 76)
- Place of death: Launceston, Tasmania, Australia
- Height: 5 ft 10 in (1.78 m)
- Position: Forward

Senior career*
Years	Team	Apps	(Gls)
1925–1932	Willesden Polytechnic		
1932	Northfleet United		
1933	Tottenham Hotspur		
1934	Folkestone		
1934–1936	Hull City	70	(25)
1936–1939	Bury	56	(15)
1939–1942	Norwich City	20	(7)
- Metro Claremont SC
- * Club domestic league appearances and goals

John Acquroff (9 September 1911 – 1987) was a footballer who played in the Football League for Bury, Hull City and Norwich City.
