= Tommy Cornthwaite =

English footballer

Personal information
- Full name: Thomas Cornthwaite
- Date of birth: 27 May 1892
- Place of birth: Galgate, England
- Date of death: 1968 (aged 75–76)
- Position: Goalkeeper

Senior career*
Years	Team	Apps	(Gls)
1911–1912	Bradford City	0	(0)
1913	Fleetwood	10	(0)
1913–1914	Preston North End	0	(0)
1919–1923	Bury	90	(0)
1926–1930	Connah's Quay & Shotton		
1930–1931	Lytham		
1931–1932	Manchester North End		
1932–1933	Crosland & Pickstone		
Total		90	(0)
- * Club domestic league appearances and goals

Thomas Cornthwaite (27 May 1892 – 1968) was an English footballer who played in the Football League for Bury. He also worked part-time as a policeman and in 1920 he missed several games for the Shakers due to a miners' strike because all police leave was cancelled.
