= Roy MacLaren (footballer) =

Scottish footballer (1930–2022)

Personal information
- Date of birth: 12 February 1930
- Place of birth: Auchterarder, Scotland
- Date of death: 25 September 2022 (aged 92)
- Position: Goalkeeper

Senior career*
Years	Team	Apps	(Gls)
1949–1955	St Johnstone	88	(0)
1955–1959	Bury	86	(0)
1959–1965	Sheffield Wednesday	31	(0)
Total		205	(0)
- * Club domestic league appearances and goals

Roy MacLaren (12 February 1930 – 25 September 2022) was a Scottish professional footballer who played as a goalkeeper.

== Career ==
Born in Auchterarder, MacLaren played for St Johnstone, Bury and Sheffield Wednesday.

He later worked as an assistant manager at Aston Villa.

== Personal life ==
His son Bruce was also a footballer.
