= Eddie Gleadall =

English footballer

Personal information
- Full name: Edward Gleadall
- Date of birth: 21 August 1931
- Place of birth: Sheffield, England
- Date of death: May 1993 (aged 61)
- Place of death: Salford, England
- Position: Winger

Senior career*
Years	Team	Apps	(Gls)
1951–1957	Bury	74	(17)
1957–1958	Scunthorpe & Lindsay United	6	(2)
1958–1959	Weymouth		
1959–1960	Mossley		
- * Club domestic league appearances and goals

Edward Gleadall (21 August 1931 – May 1993) was an English professional football winger. He played in the Football League for Bury and Scunthorpe & Lindsay United.

Gleadall joined Bury, making his debut in the 1951–52 season. He left in March 1957, joining Scunthorpe & Lindsay United.

On leaving Scunthorpe he joined Weymouth. He joined Mossley in 1959, leaving at the end the 1959–50 season.
