= Billy Redman =

English footballer

Bill Redman
Personal information
- Full name: William Redman
- Date of birth: 29 January 1928
- Place of birth: Manchester, England
- Date of death: December 1994 (aged 66)
- Place of death: Manchester, England
- Position: Defender

Senior career*
Years	Team	Apps	(Gls)
1946–1954	Manchester United	36	(0)
1954–?	Bury	37	(1)
Total		73	(1)
- * Club domestic league appearances and goals

William Redman (29 January 1928 - December 1994) was an English footballer. His regular position was as a full back.

Redman started his professional career with Manchester United in 1946. He made his United debut on 7 October 1950 in a Football League match against Sheffield Wednesday. In 1952, he helped United win the 1951-52 league title. In 1954, he was transferred to Bury, where he spent two seasons, before moving on to Buxton.
