= List of post-war Tranmere Rovers F.C. players =

Tranmere Rovers Football Club is an English association football club based in Birkenhead, Wirral. Founded in 1884, they played their first games under the name Belmont F.C.; in 1885, before the start of their second season, they adopted the name Tranmere Rovers. In 1889, Tranmere entered the West Lancashire League, and progressed through the Combination, the Lancashire Combination and the Central League. On 27 August 1921, as founder members of Division Three North, they won their first Football League match 4–1 against Crewe Alexandra at Prenton Park. Tranmere have played in the Football League ever since, with the exception of 1939–1946, when competitive football was suspended due to the Second World War. Their highest league finish was fourth in the First Division which, at the time, was the second tier of the league pyramid, in the 1992–93 season.

Harold Bell made a record 595 league appearances for Tranmere. Bell also holds the record for the most consecutive league appearances for a British team; he was picked for the first game after the Second World War in the 1946–47 season and did not miss a match until 30 August 1955, a total of 401 consecutive matches in the Third Division North. Ian Muir's tally of 142 goals in 314 league appearances makes him Tranmere's leading scorer.

== Players ==
This list contains players who have appeared in domestic league competition for Tranmere since the Second World War. It includes first-team appearances and goals in the Football League and play-offs. Appearances and goals in other competitions or non-competitive matches are not included. Statistics from the two games against Accrington Stanley in 1961–62, prior to Accrington's resignation from the Football League, have been expunged from the records and are not included. Statistics for current players are correct to the start of the 2012–13 season.

Position key
Pre-1960s		1960s–	
GK	Goalkeeper		
FB	Full back	DF	Defender
HB	Half back	MF	Midfielder
FW	Forward		

List of post-war players
Name	Position (Note: Positions are listed according to the tactical formations that were employed at the time. Thus the change in the names of defenders and midfielders reflects the tactical evolution that occurred from the 1960s onwards.)	Years (Note: Years given denote the span between a player's first and last competitive appearance. Where a player spent multiple periods at the club, these periods are denoted as multiple ranges of years.)	Appearances (Note: Statistics for players that have left the club are sourced from Brown (2012). For current players, Soccerbase is used.)	Goals	International (Note: If a player received an international first-team cap, the country or countries he represented are shown.)
Alan A'Court	MF	1964–1966	50	11	–
John Achterberg	GK	1998–2009	257	0	–
Nigel Adkins	GK	1982–1986	86	0	–
Adnan Ahmed	MF	2007–2008	6	0	Pakistan
Sam Aiston	MF	2005–2006	36	3	–
Lucas Akins	FW	2010–2012	77	7	–
John Aldridge	FW	1991–1998	242	138	Republic of Ireland
Paul Aldridge	FW	1999–2001	6	0	–
Alex Alexander	HB	1946–1949	23	3	–
Gil Alldis	HB	1938–1939, 1946–1949	77	4	–
Graham Allen	DF	1998–2004	200	10	–
Mark Allen	FW	1983–1984	10	0	–
Russell Allen	FW	1973–1978	156	44	–
Wayne Allison	FW	1999–2002	103	26	–
Jimmy Anders	MF	1961–1962	8	1	–
Doug Anderson	MF	1984–1987	126	15	–
Iain Anderson	MF	2002–2003	7	2	–
Ted Anderson	HB	1937–1939, 1945–1948	79	0	–
Godwin Antwi	DF	2008–2009	5	0	–
Alan Arnell	FW	1960–1963	68	34	–
Billy Ashcroft	FW	1985–1986	23	2	–
Llew Ashcroft	HB	1946–1947	20	4	–
Neil Ashton	MF	2003–2004	1	0	–
Barry Ashworth	MF	1966–1967	21	3	–
John Aspinall	MF	1982–1985, 1987–1988	119	26	–
Harry Atkinson	FW	1946–1955	185	91	–
Phil Babb	DF	1999–2000	4	0	Republic of Ireland
Kithson Bain	FW	2009–2010	10	0	Grenada
Bill Bainbridge	FW	1948–1954	168	64	–
Zoumana Bakayogo	DF	2009–2013	122	6	–
Stuart Barlow	FW	2000–2003	94	19	–
Charlie Barnett	MF	2008–2010	36	4	–
Graham Barnett	FW	1959–1961	32	11	–
Arthur Barrett	HB	1946–1947	1	0	–
John Barrie	FB	1948–1951	14	3	–
Gary Bauress	MF	1989–1990	1	0	–
Jack Bavin	FB	1948–1949	2	0	–
Jose Baxter	FW	2011–2012	14	3	–
Ken Beamish	FW	1965–1972, 1979–1981	236	64	–
Graham Bell	MF	1986–1987	42	4	–
Harold Bell	HB	1946–1960	595	11	–
Gary Bennett	FW	1995–1996	29	9	–
David Beresford	MF	2003–2005	44	3	–
John Best	MF	1960–1961	7	0	–
Stan Billington	DF	1960–1964	93	0	–
Charlie Birmingham	FW	1946–1947	2	1	–
Eddie Bishop	MF	1987–1991	76	19	–
Michael Black	MF	1999–2000	22	0	–
Maxime Blanchard	DF	2010–2011	20	0	–
Alan Blundell	MF	1965–1967	3	0	–
Ivano Bonetti	MF	1996–1997	13	1	–
Ken Bracewell	FB	1959–1961	28	1	–
John Bramhall	DF	1976–1982	170	7	–
Graham Branch	MF	1991–1998	102	10	–
Ged Brannan	MF	1990–1997	238	20	–
Harold Bridges	FW	1946–1948	33	9	–
Eric Brodie	MF	1969–1972	83	4	–
Marlon Broomes	DF	2009–2011	36	1	–
Andy Brown	DF	1982–1983	1	0	–
David Brown	DF	1982–1983	1	0	–
John Brown	DF	1960–1962	33	0	–
Kayleden Brown	MF	2010–2011	4	0	–
Owen Brown	FW	1981–1982, 1982–1984	93	20	–
Paul Brown	MF	2004–2005	4	0	–
Alex Bruce	DF	2005–2006	11	0	Republic of Ireland
Ryan Brunt	FW	2011–2012	15	1	–
David Buchanan	DF	2011–2012	41	1	–
Steven Bullock	DF	1986–1987	30	1	–
Dave Burgess	DF	1981–1986	218	1	–
Marshall Burke	MF	1984–1985	3	0	–
Ken Burns	HB	1946–1947	14	4	–
Robbie Burns	MF	2008–2009	2	0	–
John Byrne	FW	1961–1962	27	4	–
John Byrne	FW	1968–1969	1	0	–
Tom Byrom	HB	1946–1947	3	0	–
Paul Cahill	DF	1978–1979	5	0	–
Chris Camden	FW	1986–1987	3	1	–
Les Campbell	MF	1961–1964	99	9	–
Tommy Campbell	FW	1961–1962	4	0	–
Shane Cansdell-Sherriff	DF	2006–2008	87	6	–
George Carlson	FW	1947–1949	2	0	–
Mick Carmody	MF	1986–1987	2	0	–
Sébastien Carole	MF	2009–2010	4	0	Martinique
Bill Cartwright	HB	1946–1948	9	1	–
Gerry Casey	MF	1967–1970	52	5	–
Jake Cassidy	FW	2012–2014	55	17	–
Timothy Cathalina	DF	2010–2011	7	0	–
Harry Chadwick	HB	1947–1949	9	0	–
Dave Challinor	DF	1996–2002	140	6	–
Alec Chamberlain	GK	1987–1988	15	0	–
Wilf Charlton	HB	1957–1961	92	4	–
Ben Chorley	DF	2007–2009	76	2	–
Colin Clarke	FW	1984–1985	45	22	Northern Ireland
Gordon Clayton	GK	1959–1961	4	0	–
John Clayton	FW	1984–1986	47	35	–
Eddie Cliff	DF	1976–1979	50	4	–
Tommy Clinton	FB	1956–1957	9	0	–
Tony Coleman	MF	1962–1964	8	0	–
Paul Collings	GK	1988–1991	4	0	–
Joe Collister	GK	2009–2011	10	0	–
Sean Connelly	DF	2002–2004	70	0	–
Dick Conner	MF	1961–1962	4	0	–
John Connor	FB	1947–1949	46	3	–
Bobby Conroy	DF	1962–1965	103	1	–
Paul Cook	MF	1995–1998	60	4	–
Kevin Cooper	MF	2007–2008	4	0	–
Steve Cooper	FW	1990–1993	32	3	–
Steve Coppell	MF	1973–1975	38	10	England
Andy Coughlin	GK	2011–2012	2	0	–
Alan Cox	HB	1946–1948	8	1	–
Danny Coyne	GK	1992–1999, 2007–2008	191	0	Wales
John Coyne	FW	1971–1972	15	3	–
Tommy Coyne	FW	1992–1993	12	1	Republic of Ireland
Steve Craven	MF	1977–1982, 1987–1988	127	17	–
Bruce Crawford	MF	1965–1967	26	5	–
Aaron Cresswell	DF	2008–2011	70	5	–
Eddie Crossan	FW	1957–1958	39	6	–
Paul Crossley	MF	1969–1976	203	37	–
Jim Cumbes	GK	1966–1970	137	0	–
Craig Curran	FW	2006–2010	97	14	–
Frank Curran	FW	1947–1948	17	7	–
Tom Curtis	MF	2002–2003	8	0	–
Frank D'Arcy	DF	1972–1973	8	1	–
Eugène Dadi	FW	2003–2005	69	25	Ivory Coast
Chris Dagnall	FW	2003–2006	39	7	–
Tim Dalton	GK	1986–1987	1	0	–
Luke Daniels	GK	2009–2010	37	0	–
Liam Darville	DF	2010–2011	9	0	–
Dai Davies	GK	1983–1984	42	0	–
Keith Davies	FW	1953–1954	1	0	–
Ray Davies	HB	1951–1958	120	28	–
Steve Davies	FW	2005–2008	60	5	–
David Demaine	MF	1961–1962	2	0	–
John Dempsey	DF	1967–1972	53	1	–
Martin Devaney	MF	2011–2012	20	2	–
Vince Dillon	FW	1950–1953	33	17	–
Jimmy Dodd	FW	1956–1960	63	22	–
Ryan Donaldson	MF	2011–2012	1	0	–
Cyril Done	FW	1952–1955	87	61	–
Tom Doonan	FW	1950–1951	4	2	–
Alan Duffy	MF	1971–1973	33	2	–
Barry Dyson	FW	1962–1967	174	100	–
Harry Eastham	FW	1948–1953	154	13	–
Steve Eaton	DF	1978–1979	1	0	–
Gareth Edds	MF	2008–2010	69	5	–
Christian Edwards	DF	2002–2003	12	0	Wales
Elfyn Edwards	DF	1979–1981	62	1	–
Malcolm Edwards	DF	1962–1964	34	2	–
Mike Edwards	MF	1994–1995	3	0	–
Steve Edwards	DF	1984–1987	72	6	–
Tommy Eglington	HB	1957–1961	172	36	(Republic of Ireland) Ireland (FAI); Ireland (IFA) (Note: Between 1926 and 1950, two competing teams represented the island of Ireland – the FAI and the IFA. Eglington and Farrell were dual internationals who played for both teams.)
Lateef Elford-Alliyu	FW	2010–2011, 2011–2012	20	5	–
Kevin Ellison	MF	2006–2007	34	4	–
Norman Ellison	FW	1949–1951	2	0	–
Scott Endersby	GK	1981–1983	79	0	–
Bernard Evans	FW	1963–1964	12	5	–
Clive Evans	MF	1976–1981	178	26	–
Dennis Evans	FB	1958–1960	3	0	–
Delroy Facey	FW	2005–2006	37	8	Grenada
Kit Fagan	DF	1971–1975	84	2	–
David Fairclough	FW	1989–1990	14	1	–
Simon Farnworth	GK	1986–1987	7	0	–
Peter Farrell	HB	1957–1960	114	1	(Republic of Ireland) Ireland (FAI); Ireland (IFA)
Syd Farrimond	DF	1970–1974	134	0	–
Mark Ferguson	MF	1981–1985	87	13	–
Ian Feuer	GK	2002–2003	2	0	United States
Pat Finlay	MF	1961–1962	3	0	–
Ken Finney	HB	1957–1963	180	27	–
Mike Fleming	FW	1953–1958	115	8	–
Eddie Flood	DF	1972–1981	315	6	–
Sean Flynn	MF	2000–2002	66	6	–
Owain Fôn Williams	GK	2011–2015	161	0	–
Stephen Frail	DF	1997–2000	14	0	–
Simon Francis	DF	2005–2006	17	1	–
Ryan Fraughan	MF	2009–2011	20	0	–
David Frith	FB	1958–1963	177	0	–
John Frye	FW	1961–1962	21	6	–
Shaun Garnett	DF	1987–1996	112	5	–
Alec Gaskell	FW	1957–1958	6	6	–
Bill Gibson	FB	1951–1954	72	1	–
Neil Gibson	MF	1998–1999	1	0	–
Frank Gill	MF	1968–1971	74	8	–
Wayne Gill	MF	2000–2001	16	2	–
Chris Glennon	FW	1970–1971	2	0	–
Verdi Godwin	FW	1956–1957	14	2	–
John Good	HB	1955–1956	5	0	–
Ian Goodison	DF	2004–2014	366	11	Jamaica
Ronnie Goodlass	MF	1983–1985	21	0	–
Ben Gordon	DF	2009–2010	4	0	–
Terry Gornell	FW	2008–2011	41	3	–
Andy Gorton	GK	1987–1988	1	0	–
Harry Gould	FW	1946–1949	5	2	–
Bobby Graham	FW	1972–1973	10	3	–
Jermaine Grandison	DF	2010–2011	8	0	–
Tony Grant	MF	1999–2000	9	0	–
Kevin Gray	DF	2002–2004	12	1	–
John Green	HB	1958–1959	17	5	–
Chris Greenacre	FW	2005–2009	142	46	–
Roy Greenwood	MF	1983–1984	3	0	–
Darrell Grierson	GK	1986–1987	4	0	–
Clive Griffiths	DF	1975–1977	59	0	–
Dave Griffiths	DF	1969–1970	6	0	–
Ian Griffiths	MF	1978–1983	116	5	–
Ralph Gubbins	MF	1960–1964	107	37	–
Péter Gulácsi	GK	2009–2010, 2010–2011	17	0	–
Gavin Gunning	DF	2009–2010	6	0	–
Phil Gwatkin	HB	1956–1957	21	6	–
Paul Hall	MF	2003–2005	55	13	Jamaica
Tony Hall	DF	1987–1988	1	0	–
Bryan Hamilton	MF	1980–1985	109	6	Northern Ireland
Des Hamilton	MF	2000–2001	6	0	–
Des Harlock	HB	1946–1954	150	17	–
Bert Harris	GK	1957–1960	33	0	–
Danny Harrison	MF	2001–2007, 2012–	124	5	–
Bobby Harrop	HB	1959–1961	41	2	–
Joe Hart	GK	2006–2007	6	0	England
Jim Harvey	MF	1987–1992	184	18	–
Simon Haworth	FW	2001–2005	79	31	Wales
Alan Hay	DF	1986–1987	28	0	–
Alex Hay	FW	2001–2004	41	3	–
Reuben Hazell	DF	2000–2002	42	1	–
Stuart Heap	MF	1984–1985	3	0	–
John Heath	GK	1961–1964	58	0	–
Seamus Heath	MF	1984–1985	17	0	–
Nick Henry	MF	1999–2002	89	2	–
Paul Henry	MF	2007–2009	3	0	–
Jack Heydon	HB	1956–1961	76	1	–
Dave Hickson	FW	1962–1964	45	21	–
Dave Higgins	DF	1983–1985, 1987–1997	347	12	–
Mark Hilditch	FW	1983–1986	49	12	–
Alan Hill	HB	1956–1957	6	1	–
Clint Hill	DF	1997–2002	140	16	–
Steve Hill	MF	1964–1968	130	10	–
Jimmy Hinch	FW	1969–1971	39	10	–
Ben Hinchliffe	GK	2006–2007	2	0	–
Richard Hinds	DF	1998–2003	55	0	–
Lawrie Hodgson	FB	1946–1951	78	0	–
Alan Holder	HB	1956–1957	13	1	–
Mike Hollifield	DF	1985–1986	1	0	–
Danny Holmes	DF	2008–2009, 2011–2015	159	4	–
Jackie Hood	FW	1959–1960	3	2	–
Eric Hornby	FB	1947–1949	32	0	–
Neil Horwood	FW	1986–1987	4	1	–
Russell Howarth	GK	2002–2005	12	0	–
George Hudson	FW	1966–1969	54	20	–
David Hughes	MF	1962–1963	2	0	–
Mark Hughes	DF	1985–1994	266	9	–
Iain Hume	FW	1999–2005, 2015	161	32	Canada
Bobby Hutchinson	MF	1981–1983, 1983–1984	56	10	–
Lloyd Iceton	HB	1950–1955	140	18	–
Mike Imlach	DF	1984–1985	4	0	–
Kenny Irons	MF	1989–1999	351	54	–
Andy Jack	FW	1948–1949	3	3	–
David Jackson	MF	1961–1963	38	5	–
Michael Jackson	DF	2002–2003, 2004–2006	90	8	–
Pat Jackson	FW	1951–1954	14	1	–
Peter Jackson	MF	1961–1965	81	3	–
John James	FW	1975–1978	73	24	–
Olly James	DF	2005–2006	1	0	–
Dale Jennings	MF	2010–2011	29	6	–
Steve Jennings	MF	2003–2009	140	6	–
Richard Jobson	DF	2000–2002	17	0	–
Brian Johnson	MF	1968–1969	1	0	–
David Johnson	GK	1974–1975	3	0	–
Dick Johnson	GK	1971–1982	355	0	–
John Johnson	DF	2008–2009	4	0	–
Robert Johnstone	HB	1946–1948	40	0	–
Charlie Jolley	FW	1953–1955	6	2	–
Benny Jones	HB	1946–1948	54	19	–
Derek Jones	FB	1953–1961	155	19	–
Gary Jones	FW	1993–2000, 2002–2005	270	44	–
Lee Jones	FW	1997–2000	78	11	Wales
Les Jones	FW	1962–1965	68	29	–
Mike Jones	MF	2005–2008	10	1	–
Brian Joy	DF	1970–1971	21	1	–
Antony Kay	DF	2007–2009	82	17	–
Michael Kay	DF	2011–13	34	1	–
David Kelly	FW	1997–2000	88	21	Republic of Ireland
John Kelly	MF	1979–1982	64	9	–
Noel Kelly	FW	1955–1957	52	6	–
Robert Kelly	MF	1984–1985	5	2	–
Jeff Kenna	DF	2000–2001	11	0	Republic of Ireland
David Kennedy	MF	1967–1970	17	0	–
Bill Kenny	MF	1974–1977	54	5	–
Jon Kenworthy	MF	1993–1996	26	2	–
John Kerr	FW	1978–1983	154	38	–
John Kidd	FW	1955–1959	34	4	–
Len Kieran	HB	1947–1957	342	6	–
Alan King	MF	1962–1972	341	35	–
John King	MF	1960–1968	241	4	–
Pat Kinsella	MF	1966–1967	1	0	–
Tony Knapp	MF	1969–1971	36	1	–
Jason Koumas	MF	1997–2002, 2013–2015	178	29	Wales
Dariusz Kubicki	DF	1997–1998	12	0	Poland
Joss Labadie	MF	2009–2012	70	10	–
Harry Lamb	FW	1947–1953	88	12	–
Bill Lamont	FB	1951–1956	143	3	–
Des Lancaster	FW	1959–1960	1	0	–
Frank Lane	GK	1969–1972	76	0	–
Tommy Lawrence	GK	1971–1974	80	0	–
Craig Le Cornu	MF	1980–1981	6	0	–
Andy Lee	DF	1984–1985	18	0	–
Cliff Leeming	FW	1947–1948	13	2	–
Mark Leonard	FW	1982–1983	7	0	–
Harry Leyland	GK	1960–1966	180	0	–
Paul Linwood	DF	2003–2006	44	0	–
Harold Lloyd	GK	1946–1957	188	0	–
Shaleum Logan	DF	2009–2010	33	0	–
Tyrone Loran	DF	2002–2005	47	0	Netherlands Antilles
Roy Lorenson	MF	1960–1962	14	0	–
Jack Lornie	FW	1964–1966	35	7	–
Eddie Loyden	FW	1972–1974	61	22	–
Jim Lumby	FW	1979–1981	46	21	–
Josh Macauley	FW	2008–2009	1	0	–
Aiden Maher	MF	1971–1972	7	1	–
Alan Mahon	MF	1996–2000, 2009–2010	136	14	Republic of Ireland
John Malcolm	HB	1947–1948	22	0	–
Chris Malkin	FW	1987–1995	232	59	–
John Manning	FW	1962–1967, 1971–1972	135	71	–
Sam Mantom	MF	2010–2011	2	0	–
Barrie Martin	DF	1965–1968	103	0	–
David Martin	GK	2009–2010	3	0	–
Dave Martindale	MF	1987–1994	166	9	–
Ray Mathias	DF	1967–1985	567	6	–
Pedro Matías	MF	1999–2000	4	0	–
Danny Mayor	MF	2008–2009	3	0	–
Jason McAteer	MF	2004–2007	81	4	Republic of Ireland
Hugh McAuley	MF	1973–1974, 1978–1979	56	1	–
Seamus McBennett	HB	1948–1950	12	1	–
Mike McBurney	FW	1974–1975	5	0	–
Mark McCarrick	DF	1987–1991	125	14	–
Mark McChrystal	DF	2010–	41	1	–
Chris McCready	DF	2006–2007, 2009–2010	50	1	–
Ken McDevitt	HB	1951–1960	237	40	–
John MacDonald	FB	1949–1952	89	0	–
Charlie McDonnell	FW	1957–1961, 1963–1965	112	50	–
Roy McFarland	DF	1966–1968	35	0	England
Pat McGibbon	DF	2002–2003	4	0	Northern Ireland
John McGreal	DF	1991–1999	195	1	–
Jackie McGugan	MF	1960–1962	35	0	–
Reg McGuire	FW	1982–1983	4	0	–
Adam McGurk	FW	2010–2013	79	10	–
Kevin McIntyre	DF	1997–1998	2	0	–
Jim McKay	FW	1949–1950	12	1	–
Ken McKenna	FW	1982–1983, 1987–1989	19	3	–
Paul McLaren	MF	2006–2008, 2009–2011	129	5	–
Ally McLellan	FW	1948–1949	2	0	–
John McMahon	DF	1983–1984	40	0	–
Eric McManus	GK	1986–1987	3	0	–
Ian McMullen	MF	1984–1985	2	0	–
Neil McNab	MF	1989–1993	105	6	–
Dennis McNamara	HB	1954–1955	1	0	–
John MacNamee	MF	1967–1970	72	12	–
Don McVicar	DF	1985–1986	7	0	–
Micky Mellon	MF	1997–1999, 2000–2004	231	9	–
Arnaud Mendy	FW	2010–2011	12	1	Guinea-Bissau
David Miller	DF	1985–1986	29	1	–
Ralph Millington	HB	1950–1961	357	3	–
Jim Milner	FW	1962–1963	16	3	–
Barrie Mitchell	FW	1973–1976	83	10	–
Bernard Molyneux	FB	1956–1957	12	3	–
Fred Molyneux	DF	1970–1973	72	0	–
Kevin Mooney	DF	1982–1983	22	0	–
Dave Moorcroft	DF	1968–1972	108	1	–
Eric Moore	FB	1957–1958	36	0	–
Malcolm Moore	FW	1970–1973	91	21	–
Ronnie Moore	DF	1971–1979, 1986–1989	324	78	–
Alan Morgan	DF	1995–2002	65	1	–
Brian Morley	DF	1981–1982	16	2	–
John Morrissey	MF	1985–1999	470	50	–
Sam Morrow	FW	2010–2011	5	0	–
Derek Mountfield	DF	1980–1982	26	1	–
Ian Muir	FW	1985–1995	314	142	–
Jimmy Mulkerrin	FW	1959–1961	38	8	–
John Mullin	MF	2006–2008	50	5	–
Steve Mungall	DF	1979–1996	513	14	–
Joe Murphy	GK	1999–2002	63	0	Republic of Ireland
Eddie Murray	MF	1987–1989	27	1	–
Matt Murray	GK	2005–2006	2	0	–
Tommy Murray	MF	1960–1962	10	1	–
Tommy Mycock	HB	1952–1954	46	2	–
Thomas Myhre	GK	2000–2001	3	0	Norway
Jennison Myrie-Williams	FW	2007–2008	25	3	–
Seyni N'Diaye	FW	2000–2002	19	4	–
Alan Navarro	MF	2001–2004	45	1	–
Tommy Neill	MF	1960–1963	79	2	–
Pat Nevin	MF	1991–1992, 1992–1997	201	30	Scotland
Shane Nicholson	DF	2002–2004	54	6	–
Gunnar Nielsen	GK	2010–2011	2	0	Faroe Islands
David Nightingale	FB	1946–1947	3	0	–
Eric Nixon	GK	1987–1988, 1988–1997, 1999–2003	346	0	–
Ian Nolan	DF	1991–1994	88	1	Northern Ireland
Liam O'Brien	MF	1993–1999	181	12	Republic of Ireland
George O'Callaghan	DF	2008–2009	6	0	–
Stephen O'Leary	MF	2005–2006	21	3	–
Tommy O'Neil	MF	1978–1980	74	10	–
Luke O'Neill	DF	2009–2010	4	0	–
Billy O'Rourke	GK	1986–1988	53	0	–
Gavin Oliver	DF	1982–1983	17	1	–
James Olsen	DF	2000–2003	4	0	–
Iffy Onuora	FW	2003–2004	3	0	–
Elkanah Onyeali	FW	1960–1961	13	8	Nigeria
Stephen Osborne	DF	1972–1976	26	4	–
Dick Oxtoby	MF	1963–1964	5	0	–
Mark Palios	MF	1973–1980, 1982–1985	249	32	–
Andy Parkinson	MF	1997–2003	164	18	–
Frank Parnell	FW	1956–1957	4	3	–
Roy Parnell	DF	1964–1967	105	2	–
David Parry	MF	1967–1968	3	0	–
Les Parry	DF	1972–1984	258	4	–
Albert Payne	HB	1946–1949	10	0	–
George Payne	GK	1946–1961	439	0	–
Steve Peplow	MF	1973–1981	248	44	–
Dave Philpotts	DF	1974–1978, 1983–1985	211	11	–
Martin Pike	DF	1989–1990	2	0	–
John Platt	GK	1984–1985	8	0	–
Ray Pointon	DF	1967–1971	46	0	–
Jim Pollard	HB	1947–1949	24	1	–
Dennis Postlewhite	DF	1976–1979	33	1	–
Neville Powell	MF	1980–1985	86	4	–
Max Power	MF	2010–2015	108	12	–
Frank Prescott	FW	1946–1947	2	0	–
Jason Price	MF	2001–2003	49	11	–
Ken Price	FW	1960–1961	3	2	–
Walter Price	HB	1946–1947	3	1	–
Joe Pritchard	MF	1962–1970	178	29	–
Ray Pritchard	DF	1972–1974	14	0	–
Mark Proctor	MF	1992–1994	31	1	–
Neil Prosser	FW	1982–1983	2	0	–
Adam Proudlock	FW	2002–2003	5	0	–
Paul Rachubka	GK	2011–2012	10	0	–
Mark Rankine	MF	2004–2006	65	0	–
David Raven	DF	2005–2006, 2011–2012	28	0	–
Peter Rees	FW	1956–1957	9	4	–
Ron Rice	FW	1946–1947	4	1	–
Michael Ricketts	FW	2009–2010	12	2	England
Paul Rideout	FW	2000–2002	46	6	–
Eddie Roberts	GK	1968–1970	7	0	–
Gareth Roberts	DF	1999–2006	281	13	Wales
Ron Roberts	MF	1962–1964	56	2	–
Eddie Robertson	DF	1964–1969	147	1	–
Andy Robinson	MF	2002–2003, 2010–2014	97	18	–
Liam Robinson	FW	1985–1986	4	3	–
Marvin Robinson	FW	2002–2003	6	1	–
Billy Rodaway	DF	1984–1986	58	5	–
Alan Rogers	DF	1995–1997	57	2	–
Abe Rosenthal	FW	1938–1947, 1949–1952, 1954–1955	117	35	–
Graham Rowe	MF	1970–1971	7	0	–
John Rowland	MF	1968–1969	26	3	–
Tony Rowley	FW	1957–1961	100	47	Wales
Alex Russell	MF	1971–1973	55	7	–
Craig Russell	FW	1998–1999	4	0	–
Len Salmon	HB	1946–1948	30	1	–
Georges Santos	DF	1998–2000	47	2	Cape Verde
Bas Savage	FW	2008–2010	55	9	–
George Scott	MF	1968–1970	36	0	–
John Seasman	MF	1972–1975	17	0	–
Ben Seddon	DF	1973–1974	1	0	–
Dino Seremet	GK	2005–2006	13	0	–
Ian Sharps	DF	1998–2006	170	6	–
Hugh Shaw	FB	1955–1956	3	0	–
Paul Shepherd	MF	1998–1999	1	0	–
George Shone	FW	1946–1947	4	0	–
Ryan Shotton	DF	2008–2009	33	5	–
Enoch Showunmi	FW	2010–2012	70	14	Nigeria
Chris Shuker	MF	2006–2010	123	14	–
Barry Siddall	GK	1985–1986	12	0	–
Les Sille	HB	1948–1949	1	0	–
Steve Simonsen	GK	1997–1999	35	0	–
Nick Sinclair	DF	1984–1986	22	1	–
Roy Sinclair	MF	1963–1969, 1972–1973	150	17	–
Willie Sinclair	MF	1960–1961	4	0	–
Derek Smith	FW	1967–1970	82	21	–
John Smith	DF	1988–1989	2	0	–
Edrissa Sonko	MF	2008–2009	38	5	Gambia
Marvin Sordell	FW	2009–2010	8	1	–
Sammy Speakman	HB	1954–1956	68	9	–
Tony Spink	FW	1956–1957	7	3	–
Graham Stanley	MF	1965–1966	1	1	–
Jim Steel	FW	1987–1992	174	29	–
Percy Steele	FB	1946–1957	311	0	–
Terry Stephens	FW	1955–1957	15	5	–
Dennis Stevens	FW	1966–1968	32	3	–
Gary Stevens	DF	1994–1998	127	2	–
Willie Stevenson	MF	1973–1974	20	0	–
Robbie Stockdale	DF	2006–2008	80	0	Scotland
Stan Storton	DF	1966–1970	123	2	–
Trevor Storton	DF	1967–1972	118	8	–
Eddie Stuart	DF	1964–1966	83	2	–
Ian St. John	FW	1972–1973	9	1	–
Nicky Summerbee	MF	2005–2006	6	0	–
Gerry Tansey	HB	1955–1956	3	1	–
Andy Taylor	DF	2007–2009	69	3	–
Ash Taylor	DF	2009–2014	183	8	–
Gareth Taylor	FW	2006–2008	60	10	Wales
Ryan Taylor	DF	2002–2005	98	14	–
Scott Taylor	FW	1998–2001	108	17	–
Shaun Teale	DF	1995–1997	54	0	–
John Thomas	FW	1978–1979	11	2	–
Kevin Thomas	GK	1969–1971	18	0	–
Stan Thomas	FW	1948–1949	1	0	–
Tony Thomas	DF	1988–1997	257	12	–
Ian Thomas-Moore	FW	1994–1997, 2007–2011	179	45	–
Alex Thompson	FB	1948–1949	1	0	–
Andy Thompson	DF	1997–2000	96	4	–
John Thompson	MF	2006–2007	12	0	Republic of Ireland
Andy Thorn	DF	1996–1998	36	1	–
Sean Thornton	MF	2001–2002	11	1	–
Adrian Thorpe	MF	1986–1987	5	3	–
Andy Thorpe	DF	1986–1988	53	0	–
Tommy Tilston	FW	1951–1952	25	15	–
Mustafa Tiryaki	FW	2011–2012	30	3	–
Ray Train	MF	1985–1986	36	0	–
Carl Tremarco	DF	2004–2008	52	1	–
Franklin Twist	MF	1965–1966	7	3	–
Bobby Tynan	MF	1972–1978	195	26	–
Tommy Veitch	MF	1972–1975	79	5	–
Steve Vickers	DF	1985–1994	311	11	–
James Wallace	MF	2012–2014	54	6	–
Arthur Walls	FW	1954–1956	22	6	–
Gavin Ward	GK	2006–2007	38	1	–
Tony Warner	GK	2010–2011	25	0	Trinidad and Tobago
Steve Warriner	DF	1982–1983	9	0	–
John Webb	DF	1974–1975	20	0	–
Jimmy Weir	MF	1964–1965	13	3	–
Robbie Weir	MF	2010–2012	57	3	–
Keith Welch	GK	2002–2003	2	0	–
Barry Wellings	FW	1982–1983, 1983–1984	25	3	–
John Welsh	MF	2009–2012	130	11	–
Gordon West	GK	1976–1979	17	0	–
Brian Westlake	FW	1966–1967	14	3	–
Johnny Wheeler	HB	1948–1951	101	9	England
Phil Whitehead	GK	2002–2003	2	0	–
Theo Whitmore	MF	2004–2006	37	5	Jamaica
Steve Whittingham	FW	1978–1981	2	0	–
Barry Wilkinson	MF	1963–1964	3	0	–
Gary Williams	DF	1976–1977, 1982–1989	175	16	–
Graham Williams	MF	1966–1968	74	12	–
Jackie Williams	HB	1946–1947	1	0	–
John Williams	DF	1978–1985	173	12	–
Keith Williams	FW	1957–1961	161	88	–
Ray Williams	HB	1951–1959	197	12	–
Ryan Williams	MF	1998–1999	5	0	–
Tommy Williams	HB	1946–1957	53	2	–
Jim Williamson	FW	1946–1947	4	3	–
Stewart Williamson	HB	1946–1953	92	21	–
Bob Wilson	DF	1962–1964	54	0	–
Mark Wilson	MF	2008–2009	5	0	–
Steve Wilson	GK	2005–2006	12	0	–
Don Woan	HB	1953–1955	27	2	–
Archie Wood	HB	1949–1950	31	5	–
Nick Wood	DF	2010–2011	11	0	–
Steve Wooddin	MF	1974–1975	3	0	New Zealand
Billy Woods	MF	1996–1997	1	0	–
Ray Woods	MF	1982–1985	14	2	–
Scott Wootton	DF	2010–2011	7	1	–
Frank Worthington	FW	1985–1987	59	21	–
George Yardley	FW	1966–1971	123	68	–
Steve Yates	DF	1999–2002	113	7	–
Ron Yeats	MF	1971–1974	97	5	Scotland
Tommy Young	MF	1972–1977	172	27	–
Calvin Zola	FW	2004–2008	96	16	–
