= 1953–54 Liverpool F.C. season =

English football club season

Liverpool
1953–54 season
- Manager: Don Welsh
- First Division: 22nd
- FA Cup: Third round
- Top goalscorer: League: Sammy Smyth (13); All: Sammy Smyth (13)
- Highest home attendance: 51,167 (v West Bromwich Albion, League, 26 December)
- Lowest home attendance: 22,000 (v Middlesbrough, League, 19 April)
- Average home league attendance: 36,150
| Home colours | Away colours |

The 1953–54 season was the 62nd season in Liverpool F.C.'s, and would be their last season in the First Division for eight years after they finished bottom of the table. This relegation broke a streak of forty-nine consecutive seasons in the top flight. It remains the last time that Liverpool have been relegated from the top division.

== Goalkeepers ==
- (England) Charlie Ashcroft
- (England) Russell Crossley
- (England) Dave Underwood

== Defenders ==
- (England) Don Campbell
- (England) Albert Childs
- (England) Laurie Hughes
- (England) Brian Jackson
- (England) Bill Jones
- (Wales) Ray Lambert
- (England) Frank Lock
- (England) Ronnie Moran
- (England) Tom McNulty
- (England) Bob Paisley
- (England) Eddie Spicer
- (England) Phil Taylor
- (England) Fred Tomley
- (England) Geoff Twentyman

== Midfielders ==
- (England) Alan A'Court
- (England) Brian Jackson
- (Scotland) Billy Liddell
- (England) Joseph Maloney
- (England) Jimmy Payne
- (England) Roy Saunders
- (England) Jack Smith
- (England) Barry Wilkinson

== Forwards ==
- (England) Eric Anderson
- (England) Alan Arnell
- (England) Kevin Baron
- (England) Louis Bimpson
- (England) John Evans
- (England) Harold Jones
- (England) Arthur Rowley
- (Wales) Tony Rowley
- (Northern Ireland) Sammy Smyth

== Squad statistics ==
=== Appearances and goals ===
| No. | Pos | Nat | Player | Total | | Division 1 | | FA Cup | |
| No. | Pos | Nat | Player | Apps | Goals | Apps | Goals | Apps | Goals |
|---|---|---|---|---|---|---|---|---|---|
| | MF | (England) ENG | Alan A'Court | 16 | 3 | 16 | 3 | 0 | 0 |
| | FW | (England) ENG | Eric Anderson | 13 | 5 | 13 | 5 | 0 | 0 |
| | FW | (England) ENG | Alan Arnell | 3 | 1 | 3 | 1 | 0 | 0 |
| | GK | (England) ENG | Charlie Ashcroft | 6 | 0 | 6 | 0 | 0 | 0 |
| | FW | (England) ENG | Kevin Baron | 17 | 4 | 17 | 4 | 0 | 0 |
| | FW | (England) ENG | Louis Bimpson | 24 | 13 | 24 | 13 | 0 | 0 |
| | DF | (England) ENG | Don Campbell | 2 | 0 | 2 | 0 | 0 | 0 |
| | DF | (England) ENG | Albert Childs | 2 | 0 | 2 | 0 | 0 | 0 |
| | GK | (England) ENG | Russell Crossley | 19 | 0 | 18 | 0 | 1 | 0 |
| | FW | (England) ENG | John Evans | 17 | 5 | 16 | 5 | 1 | 0 |
| | DF | (England) ENG | Laurie Hughes | 28 | 0 | 27 | 0 | 1 | 0 |
| | MF | (England) ENG | Brian Jackson | 28 | 4 | 27 | 4 | 1 | 0 |
| | FW | (England) ENG | Harold Jones | 1 | 0 | 1 | 0 | 0 | 0 |
| | DF | (England) ENG | Bill Jones | 26 | 6 | 25 | 6 | 1 | 0 |
| | DF | (Wales) WAL | Ray Lambert | 21 | 1 | 20 | 1 | 1 | 0 |
| | MF | (Scotland) SCO | Billy Liddell | 37 | 6 | 36 | 6 | 1 | 0 |
| | DF | (England) ENG | Frank Lock | 19 | 0 | 18 | 0 | 1 | 0 |
| | DF | (England) ENG | Joe Maloney | 6 | 0 | 6 | 0 | 0 | 0 |
| | DF | (England) ENG | Tom McNulty | 12 | 0 | 12 | 0 | 0 | 0 |
| | DF | (England) ENG | Ronnie Moran | 1 | 0 | 1 | 0 | 0 | 0 |
| | DF | (England) ENG | Bob Paisley | 20 | 2 | 20 | 2 | 0 | 0 |
| | MF | (England) ENG | Jimmy Payne | 18 | 3 | 17 | 3 | 1 | 0 |
| | FW | (Wales) WAL | Tony Rowley | 2 | 1 | 2 | 1 | 0 | 0 |
| | MF | (England) ENG | Roy Saunders | 19 | 0 | 19 | 0 | 0 | 0 |
| | MF | (England) ENG | Jack Smith | 3 | 0 | 3 | 0 | 0 | 0 |
| | FW | (Northern Ireland) NIR | Sammy Smyth | 26 | 13 | 26 | 13 | 0 | 0 |
| | DF | (England) ENG | Eddie Spicer | 23 | 0 | 23 | 0 | 0 | 0 |
| | DF | (England) ENG | Phil Taylor | 7 | 0 | 6 | 0 | 1 | 0 |
| | DF | (England) ENG | Geoff Twentyman | 20 | 0 | 20 | 0 | 0 | 0 |
| | GK | (England) ENG | Dave Underwood | 18 | 0 | 18 | 0 | 0 | 0 |
| | MF | (England) ENG | Barry Wilkinson | 19 | 0 | 18 | 0 | 1 | 0 |

== Table ==
| Pos | Team | Pld | W | D | L | GF | GA | GAv | Pts | Relegation |
|---|---|---|---|---|---|---|---|---|---|---|
| 18 | Sunderland | 42 | 14 | 8 | 20 | 81 | 89 | 0.910 | 36 | |
| 19 | Sheffield Wednesday | 42 | 15 | 6 | 21 | 70 | 91 | 0.769 | 36 | |
| 20 | Sheffield United | 42 | 11 | 11 | 20 | 69 | 90 | 0.767 | 33 | |
| 21 | Middlesbrough (R) | 42 | 10 | 10 | 22 | 60 | 91 | 0.659 | 30 | Relegation to the Second Division |
| 22 | Liverpool (R) | 42 | 9 | 10 | 23 | 68 | 97 | 0.701 | 28 | Relegation to the Second Division |

Source: World Football
Rules for classification: 1) Points; 2) Goal average; 3) Goals scored
(R) Relegated

== Results ==
=== First Division ===
| Date | Opponents | Venue | Result | Scorers | Attendance | Report 1 | Report 2 |
|---|---|---|---|---|---|---|---|
| 19-Aug-53 | Portsmouth | H | 3–1 | B.Jones 26', 72' Liddell 84' | 39,662 | Report | Report |
| 22-Aug-53 | Manchester United | H | 4–4 | Liddell 20' B.Jones 44' Bimpson 54', 58' | 46,725 | Report | Report |
| 26-Aug-53 | Newcastle United | H | 2–2 | Baron 2 | 47,263 | Report | Report |
| 29-Aug-53 | Bolton Wanderers | A | 0–2 | | 28,277 | Report | Report |
| 02-Sep-53 | Newcastle United | A | 0–4 | | 47,000 | Report | Report |
| 05-Sep-53 | Preston North End | H | 1–5 | B.Jones 55' | 46,928 | Report | Report |
| 07-Sep-53 | Wolverhampton Wanderers | A | 1–2 | Jackson 87' | 35,701 | Report | Report |
| 12-Sep-53 | Tottenham Hotspur | A | 1–2 | B.Jones 58' | 45,000 | Report | Report |
| 16-Sep-53 | Wolverhampton Wanderers | H | 1–1 | B.Jones 69' | 40,000 | Report | Report |
| 19-Sep-53 | Burnley | H | 4–0 | Bimpson 2', 6', 22', 44' | 36,643 | Report | Report |
| 26-Sep-53 | Charlton Athletic | A | 0–6 | | 31,000 | Report | Report |
| 03-Oct-53 | Sheffield Wednesday | H | 2–2 | Paisley 30' Bimpson 34' | 38,647 | Report | Report |
| 10-Oct-53 | Aston Villa | H | 6–1 | Liddell 14' Smyth 69', 80' Paisley 72' Payne 80' Own goal 88' | 37,759 | Report | Report |
| 17-Oct-53 | Huddersfield Town | A | 0–2 | | 30,115 | Report | Report |
| 24-Oct-53 | Sheffield United | H | 3–0 | Payne 19' Smyth 58', 60' | 37,978 | Report | Report |
| 31-Oct-53 | Chelsea | A | 2–5 | Smyth 12 84' | 33,000 | Report | Report |
| 07-Nov-53 | Manchester City | H | 2–2 | Bimpson 43' Baron 58' | 30,917 | Report | Report |
| 14-Nov-53 | Sunderland | A | 2–3 | Smyth 20 40' | 36,369 | Report | Report |
| 21-Nov-53 | Arsenal | H | 1–2 | Bimpson 40' | 47,814 | Report | Report |
| 28-Nov-53 | Cardiff City | A | 1–3 | Bimpson 38' | 15,000 | Report | Report |
| 05-Dec-53 | Blackpool | H | 5–2 | Payne 45' A'Court 53', 57' Arnell 79' Smyth 88' | 47,320 | Report | Report |
| 12-Dec-53 | Portsmouth | A | 1–5 | Smyth 31' | 23,509 | Report | Report |
| 19-Dec-53 | Manchester United | A | 1–5 | Bimpson 58' | 26,074 | Report | Report |
| 25-Dec-53 | West Bromwich Albion | A | 2–5 | A'Court Lambert pen 71' | 28,000 | Report | Report |
| 26-Dec-53 | West Bromwich Albion | H | 0–0 | | 51,167 | Report | Report |
| 02-Jan-54 | Bolton Wanderers | H | 1–2 | Evans 2' | 44,383 | Report | Report |
| 16-Jan-54 | Preston North End | A | 1–2 | Baron 71' | 27,000 | Report | Report |
| 23-Jan-54 | Tottenham Hotspur | H | 2–2 | Liddell 53' Evans 75' | 43,592 | Report | Report |
| 06-Feb-54 | Burnley | A | 1–1 | Anderson 81' | 23,000 | Report | Report |
| 13-Feb-54 | Charlton Athletic | H | 2–3 | Evans 28' Anderson 41' | 47,657 | Report | Report |
| 24-Feb-54 | Sheffield Wednesday | A | 1–1 | Anderson 86' | 10,000 | Report | Report |
| 27-Feb-54 | Aston Villa | A | 1–2 | Bimpson 70' | 25,000 | Report | Report |
| 06-Mar-54 | Huddersfield Town | H | 1–3 | Evans 11' | 46,074 | Report | Report |
| 13-Mar-54 | Sheffield United | A | 1–3 | Liddell pen 18' | 17,000 | Report | Report |
| 20-Mar-54 | Chelsea | H | 1–1 | Anderson 84' | 36,292 | Report | Report |
| 03-Apr-54 | Sunderland | H | 4–3 | Jackson 45' Evans 48' Liddell pen 67' Anderson 71' | 30,417 | Report | Report |
| 07-Apr-54 | Manchester City | A | 2–0 | Jackson 44', 57' | 13,593 | Report | Report |
| 10-Apr-54 | Arsenal | A | 0–3 | | 33,178 | Report | Report |
| 16-Apr-54 | Middlesbrough | A | 1–0 | Smyth 19' | 30,000 | Report | Report |
| 17-Apr-54 | Cardiff City | H | 0–1 | | 41,340 | Report | Report |
| 19-Apr-54 | Middlesbrough | H | 4–1 | Rowley 29' Smyth 37', 63' Liddell 68' | 22,000 | Report | Report |
| 24-Apr-54 | Blackpool | A | 0–3 | | 18,651 | Report | Report |

=== FA Cup ===
| Date | Opponents | Venue | Result | Scorers | Attendance | Report 1 | Report 2 |
|---|---|---|---|---|---|---|---|
| 09-Jan-54 | Bolton Wanderers | A | 0–1 | | 45,341 | Report | Report |
