= 1954–55 Liverpool F.C. season =

English football club season

Liverpool
1954–55 season
- Manager: Don Welsh
- Second Division: 11th
- FA Cup: Fifth round
- Top goalscorer: League: Billy Liddell (30); All: John Evans (33)
- Highest home attendance: 57,528 (v Huddersfield Town, FA Cup, 19 February)
- Lowest home attendance: 24,073 (v Ipswich Town, League, 25 December)
- Average home league attendance: 36,150
Home colours

The 1954–55 season was the 63rd season in Liverpool F.C.'s existence and their first year in the Second Division since 1905, after their relegation from the First Division the previous season.

Not only did Liverpool not make any sort of promotion challenge this season, a terrible start saw them in serious danger of relegation to the Third Division North for much of the season. A late run of form ultimately saw Liverpool safe, but their eventual finish of 11th place remains their lowest-ever Football League final position.

== Goalkeepers ==
- (England) Charlie Ashcroft
- (South Africa) Doug Rudham
- (England) Dave Underwood

== Defenders ==
- (England) Keith Burkinshaw
- (England) Don Campbell
- (England) Laurie Hughes
- (Wales) Ray Lambert
- (Wales) Frank Lock
- (England) Ronnie Moran
- (England) Tom McNulty
- (England) Fred Perry
- (Wales) John Price
- (England) Alex South
- (England) Fred Tomley
- (England) Geoff Twentyman
- (England) Dick White

== Midfielders ==
- (England) Alan A'Court
- (England) Brian Jackson
- (England) Jimmy Payne
- (England) Roy Saunders
- (England) Barry Wilkinson

== Forwards ==
- (England) Eric Anderson
- (England) Alan Arnell
- (England) Louis Bimpson
- (England) John Evans
- (Scotland) Billy Liddell
- (Wales) Tony Rowley

== Squad statistics ==
=== Appearances and goals ===
No.	Pos	Nat	Player	Total		Division 2		FA Cup	
No.	Pos	Nat	Player	Apps	Goals	Apps	Goals	Apps	Goals
	MF	(England) ENG	Alan A'Court	33	3	30	2	3	1
	FW	(England) ENG	Eric Anderson	35	9	32	9	3	0
	FW	(England) ENG	Alan Arnell	8	3	7	3	1	0
	GK	(England) ENG	Charlie Ashcroft	15	0	14	0	1	0
	FW	(England) ENG	Louis Bimpson	9	2	8	2	1	0
	DF	(England) ENG	Keith Burkinshaw	1	0	1	0	0	0
	DF	(England) ENG	Don Campbell	12	0	12	0	0	0
	FW	(England) ENG	John Evans	42	33	38	29	4	4
	DF	(England) ENG	Laurie Hughes	29	0	26	0	3	0
	MF	(England) ENG	Brian Jackson	26	3	23	3	3	0
	DF	(Wales) WAL	Ray Lambert	32	0	28	0	4	0
	MF	(Scotland) SCO	Billy Liddell	44	31	40	30	4	1
	DF	(England) ENG	Frank Lock	23	0	23	0	0	0
	DF	(England) ENG	Tom McNulty	19	0	19	0	0	0
	DF	(England) ENG	Ronnie Moran	21	0	17	0	4	0
	MF	(England) ENG	Jimmy Payne	18	2	17	2	1	0
	FW	(Wales) WAL	Tony Rowley	13	8	13	8	0	0
	GK	(South Africa) RSA	Doug Rudham	25	0	22	0	3	0
	MF	(England) ENG	Roy Saunders	32	0	28	0	4	0
	DF	(England) ENG	Alex South	7	1	6	1	1	0
	DF	(England) ENG	Fred Tomley	2	0	2	0	0	0
	DF	(England) ENG	Geoff Twentyman	39	3	35	3	4	0
	GK	(England) ENG	Dave Underwood	6	0	6	0	0	0
	MF	(England) ENG	Barry Wilkinson	15	0	15	0	0	0

== Table ==
Pos	Team	Pld	W	D	L	GF	GA	GAv	Pts
9	Bristol Rovers	42	19	7	16	75	70	1.071	45
10	Swansea Town	42	17	9	16	86	83	1.036	43
11	Liverpool	42	16	10	16	92	96	0.958	42
12	Middlesbrough	42	18	6	18	73	82	0.890	42
13	Bury	42	15	11	16	77	72	1.069	41

Rules for classification: 1) Points; 2) Goal average; 3) Goals scored

== Results ==
=== Second Division ===
Date	Opponents	Venue	Result	Scorers	Attendance	Report 1	Report 2
21-Aug-54	Doncaster Rovers	H	3–2	Rowley 61', 86', 89'	49,741	Report	Report
23-Aug-54	Plymouth Argyle	A	0–1		25,574	Report	Report
28-Aug-54	Derby County	A	2–3	Evans 60' Bimpson 79'	18,777	Report	Report
01-Sep-54	Plymouth Argyle	H	3–3	Evans 67' Arnell 81', 88'	32,777	Report	Report
04-Sep-54	West Ham United	H	1–2	Payne 76'	37,593	Report	Report
06-Sep-54	Bristol Rovers	A	0–3		25,574	Report	Report
11-Sep-54	Blackburn Rovers	A	3–4	Evans 5', 25' Liddell 87'	29,200	Report	Report
15-Sep-54	Bristol Rovers	H	5–3	Evans 7', 39', 40', 70', 85'	31,100	Report	Report
18-Sep-54	Fulham	H	4–1	Liddell pen 24', 65', pen 89' Evans 81'	44,372	Report	Report
25-Sep-54	Swansea Town	A	2–3	Liddell 24' Rowley 80'	25,836	Report	Report
02-Oct-54	Notts County	H	3–1	Anderson 11', 69' Evans 30'	37,639	Report	Report
09-Oct-54	Rotherham United	H	3–1	A'Court 25' Liddell 62' Evans 85'	45,868	Report	Report
16-Oct-54	Stoke City	A	0–2		23,569	Report	Report
23-Oct-54	Bury	H	1–1	Anderson 88'	33,310	Report	Report
30-Oct-54	Lincoln City	A	3–3	Anderson 24' Liddell 37', 66'	13,800	Report	Report
06-Nov-54	Hull City	H	2–1	Twentyman 29' Anderson 69'	32,592	Report	Report
13-Nov-54	Luton Town	A	2–3	Liddell pen 58' Evans 61'	15,000	Report	Report
20-Nov-54	Nottingham Forest	H	1–0	Liddell pen 49'	33,509	Report	Report
27-Nov-54	Leeds United	A	2–2	Liddell 4', 88'	22,000	Report	Report
04-Dec-54	Middlesbrough	H	3–1	Liddell pen 42', 54' Twentyman 57'	26,749	Report	Report
11-Dec-54	Birmingham City	A	1–9	Liddell 16'	17,500	Report	Report
18-Dec-54	Doncaster Rovers	A	1–4	Evans 61'	9,655	Report	Report
25-Dec-54	Ipswich Town	H	6–2	Liddell 4 1 pen' Bimpson Evans	24,073	Report	Report
27-Dec-54	Ipswich Town	A	0–2		19,000	Report	Report
01-Jan-55	Derby County	H	2–0	Jackson 60' Liddell 88'	34,237	Report	Report
22-Jan-55	Blackburn Rovers	H	4–1	Liddell 14 pen 54' Evans 60', 90'	45,543	Report	Report
05-Feb-55	Fulham	A	2–1	Rowley 11' Evans 22'	24,000	Report	Report
12-Feb-55	Swansea Town	H	1–1	Twentyman 78'	42,249	Report	Report
03-Mar-55	Notts County	A	3–0	Arnell 14' A'Court 51' Rowley 81'	11,000	Report	Report
05-Mar-55	Stoke City	H	2–4	Evans 34', 87'	35,655	Report	Report
12-Mar-55	Bury	A	4–3	Evans 16', 29', 47', 70'	16,081	Report	Report
19-Mar-55	Lincoln City	H	2–4	Liddell pen 18', 84'	31,805	Report	Report
26-Mar-55	Hull City	A	2–2	Anderson 13' Evans 16'	6,000	Report	Report
02-Apr-55	Luton Town	H	4–4	Evans 3', 22' Anderson 14' South 85'	30,710	Report	Report
08-Apr-55	Port Vale	A	3–4	Anderson 32' Evans 40' Liddell 46'	25,000	Report	Report
09-Apr-55	Nottingham Forest	A	1–3	Liddell 7'	15,409	Report	Report
11-Apr-55	Port Vale	H	1–1	Jackson 67'	36,285	Report	Report
16-Apr-55	Leeds United	H	2–2	Payne 47' Rowley 58'	34,950	Report	Report
23-Apr-55	Middlesbrough	A	2–1	Rowley 25' Liddell 64'	16,000	Report	Report
26-Apr-55	West Ham United	A	3–0	Evans 70' Anderson 73', 87'	9,000	Report	Report
30-Apr-55	Birmingham City	H	2–2	Liddell pen 12', 75'	38,392	Report	Report
02-May-55	Rotherham United	A	1–6	Liddell 90'	17,000	Report	Report

=== FA Cup ===
Date	Opponents	Venue	Result	Scorers	Attendance	Report 1	Report 2
08-Jan-55	Lincoln City	A	1–1	Evans 10'	15,399	Report	Report
12-Jan-55	Lincoln City	H	1–0	Evans 100'	32,179	Report	Report
29-Jan-55	Everton	A	4–0	Liddell 18' A'Court 29' Evans 57', 75'	72,000	Report	Report
19-Feb-55	Huddersfield Town	H	0–2		57,115	Report	Report
