= Edward Roberts =

Edward Roberts may refer to:

== Politics ==
- Edward Roberts (Canadian politician) (1940–2022), Canadian politician and lieutenant governor of Newfoundland and Labrador
- Edward Roberts (mayor) (c. 1690–c. 1752), mayor of Philadelphia
- Edward Elliott Roberts (1863–1950), clerk, administrator, politician and chief president of the Australian Natives' Association
- Edward D. Roberts (1864–1920), California state treasurer, 1911–1915

== Sports ==
=== Cricket ===
- Edward Roberts (New Zealand cricketer) (1891–1972)
- Edward Roberts (South African cricketer) (1903–?)
- Edward Allen Roberts (1907–1986), MCC and Minor Counties cricketer
- Edward Stanley Roberts (1890–1964), Worcestershire cricketer

=== Other sports ===
- Eddie Roberts (boxer) (1903–1968), American boxer and actor
- Edward Roberts (athlete) (1892–1956), American track and field athlete
- Edward Roberts (footballer) (1891–?), Welsh footballer
- Fireball Roberts (Edward Glenn Roberts Jr., 1929–1964), American race car driver
- Ned Roberts (Edward John Roberts, 1867–1940), Welsh rugby player

== Others ==
- Edward Roberts (bishop) (1908–2001), Church of England bishop
- Edward Roberts (chemist), British-born American scientist
- Edward Roberts (priest) (1877–1968), Anglican dean of Brecon Cathedral
- Edward B. Roberts (1935–2024), American technology writer and businessman
- E. F. D. Roberts (Edward Frederick Denis Roberts, 1927–1990), British librarian

== See also ==
- Ed Roberts (disambiguation)
- Ned H. Roberts (1866–1948), gun writer, ballistician, firearms experimenter
- Ted Roberts (1931–2015), screenwriter
- Edward Robert (disambiguation)
- Edward Robertson (disambiguation)
