= Bavin =

Bavin may refer to:

== People ==
- Jack Bavin (1921–2001), English footballer
- Thomas Bavin (1874–1941), Australian politician
- Timothy John Bavin (born 1935), Bishop of Johannesburg
- Yuri Bavin, Russian footballer

== Other ==
- Bavin ministry, government under Australian politician Thomas Bavin
- Bavin's Gulls, a group of islands in the River Thames, England
- Clark R. Bavin National Fish and Wildlife Forensic Laboratory in Ashland, Oregon, United States
- Bavin (wood) A log or bundle of long sticks; see fascine
