= Hugh McAuley =

Hugh McAuley may refer to:

- Hugh McAuley (footballer, born 1953), English football player for Plymouth Argyle, Charlton Athletic, Tranmere Rovers and Carlisle United
- Hugh McAuley (footballer, born 1976), English football player for Cheltenham Town
