= Brian Johnson (disambiguation) =

Brian Johnson or Bryan Johnson most often refers to:

- Brian Johnson (born 1947), the lead singer of the Australian hard rock band AC/DC.
- Bryan Johnson (born 1977), American entrepreneur, founder of Braintree, known for his anti-ageing practices

Brian Johnson or Bryan Johnson is also the name of:

== Entertainment ==
- Brian Johnson (special effects artist) (1939–2026), British film and television special effects director
- Brian D. Johnson, Canadian film critic and filmmaker
- Brian Johnson, character in the television series My Parents Are Aliens
- Brian Johnson, character in the film The Breakfast Club
- Bryan Johnson (singer) (1926–1995), who placed second in the 1960 Eurovision Song Contest
- B. S. Johnson (Bryan Stanley Johnson, 1933–1973), English poet, novelist and film-maker
- Bryan Johnson (comic book writer) (born 1967), co-stars on Comic Book Men
- Brian Johnson (Bethel Music singer) (born 1978), lead singer in Bethel Music and member of the duo Brian & Jenn Johnson
- Brian Johnson (TV personality) (born 1987), better known as Chad Johnson, reality TV personality
- Liver King (born 1978), Internet personage of Brian Michael Johnson, social media personality.

== Sports ==
=== American football ===
- Bryan Johnson (fullback) (born 1978), American NFL football player for the Washington Redskins and Chicago Bears
- Brian Johnson (fullback) (born 1979), American NFL football player for the San Francisco 49ers
- Brian Johnson (American football coach) (born 1987), American NFL football coach
- Bryan Johnson (defensive end) (born 1988), American NFL football player for the Buffalo Bills and New York Jets
- Brian Johnson (kicker) (born 1999), American NFL football placekicker

=== Association football (soccer) ===
- Brian Johnson (footballer, born 1930) (1930–2013), English footballer
- Brian Johnson (footballer, born 1948), English footballer for Tranmere Rovers
- Brian Johnson (footballer, born 1955), English footballer
- Brian Johnson (soccer) (born 1974), American soccer midfielder

=== Other sports ===
- Brian Johnson (Australian footballer) (1932–2015), Australian rules footballer
- Brian Johnson (rugby league) (1956–2016), Australian rugby league footballer and coach
- Brian Johnson (rugby union) (1930–1966), Australian rugby union player
- Brian Johnson (ice hockey) (born 1960), Canadian ice hockey winger
- Brian Johnson (catcher) (born 1968), American baseball player
- Brian Johnson Jr. (born 1979), American stock car racing driver
- Brian Johnson (long jumper) (born 1980), American long jumper
- Bryan Johnson (motorcyclist) (born 1986), American supercross and motocross rider
- Brian Johnson (curler) (fl. 1990s), Australian curler
- Brian Johnson (pitcher) (born 1990), American baseball player
- Brian Johnson (figure skater) (born 1995), American pair skater

== Other ==
- Brian K. Johnson, past president of Montgomery College
- Brian F. G. Johnson (born 1938), British scientist and professor of chemistry
- Brian Johnson (politician) (born 1961), Minnesota politician and member of the Minnesota House of Representatives

== See also ==
- Alexander Bryan Johnson (1786–1867), British-born American philosopher and semanticist
- Evelyn Bryan Johnson (1909–2012), early female aircraft pilot
- Brian Johnston (disambiguation)
