= Horwood (surname) =

Horwood is a surname. Notable people with the surname include:

- Alec Horwood (1914–1944), British Army officer and Victoria Cross recipient
- Bonnie Horwood (born 1987), English women's footballer
- Charles Horwood (1839–1870), English cricketer
- Edgar Lewis Horwood (1868–1957), Canadian architect
- Evan Horwood (born 1986), English footballer
- Harold Horwood (1923–2006), Canadian writer and politician
- Joel Horwood, English playwright
- John Horwood (1803–1821), English convicted murderer
- Martin Horwood (born 1962), British politician
- Neil Horwood (born 1964), Scottish footballer
- Owen Horwood (1916–1998), South African politician
- Ray Horwood (1927–2009), Australian rules footballer
- Richard Horwood (1757/8–1803), English surveyor and cartographer
- Stanley Horwood (1877–1959), South African cricketer
- William Horwood (disambiguation), multiple people

== See also ==
- Craig Revel Horwood (born 1965), Australian-British dancer, choreographer, theatre director and television personality
