= Tansey =

Tansey is a surname. Notable people with this surname include:

- Charlotte Tansey (c. 1922–2010), Canadian academic
- Gerry Tansey, English football player
- Greg Tansey (born 1988), English football player
- Jim Tansey (born 1953), Australian football player
- Jimmy Tansey (1929–2012), English football player
- John Tansey (1901–1971), American actor
- Jordan Tansey (born 1986), English rugby league player
- Luraine Tansey (1918–2014), American slide librarian
- Marie Tansey (1930–2016), American politician
- Mark Tansey (born 1949), American painter
- Paul Tansey (1949-2008), Irish journalist
- Sarah Tansey (born 1972), British actress
- Seamus Tansey (1943–2022), Irish flute player
- Tilli Tansey (born 1953), British historian of medical science

== Given name ==
- Tansey Coetzee (born 1984), South African beauty pageant titleholder

== Places ==
- Tansey, Queensland, a town and locality in the Gympie Region, Queensland, Australia

== See also ==
- Tansy, a plant
- Tansley, a village in Derbyshire
