= Frank Gill =

Frank Gill may refer to:

- Frank Gill (Australian footballer) (1908–1970), Australian rules footballer with Carlton
- Frank Gill (footballer, born 1948), footballer for Tranmere Rovers
- Frank Gill (politician) (1917–1982), New Zealand politician
- Frank Gill (ornithologist) (born 1941), American ornithologist
- Frank Gill (engineer) (1866–1950), British telephony engineer
