= Thomas Byrom =

Thomas Byrom may refer to:

- Tom Byrom (footballer, born 1889) (1889-1958), English footballer see List of Oldham Athletic A.F.C. players (1–24 appearances)
- Tom Byrom (1920-1997), English footballer
