= Alex Alexander =

Alex Alexander may refer to:

- Alex Alexander (swimmer) (born 1945), Australian former swimmer
- Alex Alexander (footballer) (1924–2005), footballer for New Brighton and Tranmere Rovers
