= Horwood =

Horwood may refer to:

== Places ==
- Horwood, Devon, a village in Devon, England
  - Horwood, Lovacott and Newton Tracey, a civil parish in Devon, England
- Horwood, Newfoundland and Labrador, a community in Newfoundland and Labrador, Canada
- Great Horwood and Little Horwood, villages and civil parishes in Buckinghamshire, England

== Other uses ==
- Horwood (surname)
- Horwood Bagshaw, an Australian manufacturing company
