= Whorwood =

Whorwood is a surname. Notable people with the surname include:

- Brome Whorwood (1615–1684), English politician
- Jane Whorwood (1612–1684), English spy, wife of Brome Whorwood
- Matthew Whorwood (born 1989), British Paralympic swimmer
- Thomas Whorwood (1544–1616), English politician
- Thomas Whorwood (1718–1771), High Sheriff of Oxfordshire
- William Whorwood (c. 1500–1545), English lawyer

== See also ==
- Horwood (surname)
