= Brian Johnston (disambiguation) =

Brian Johnston (1912–1994) was a British cricketer and broadcaster.

Brian Johnston may also refer to:

- Brian Johnston (literary researcher) (1932–2013), British literary researcher
- Brian Johnston (rugby league) (born 1958), Australian rugby league player
- Brian Johnston (linebacker) (born 1986), American football player
- Brian Johnston (center) (born 1962), American football player
- Brian Johnston (fighter) (born 1968), American mixed martial artist
- Brian Johnston (field hockey) (1933–1998), New Zealand field hockey player

== See also ==
- Brian Johnson (disambiguation)
