= Edward Robertson =

Edward, Ed or Eddie Robertson may refer to:

== Public officials ==
- Edward White Robertson (1823–1887), United States Representative from Louisiana
- Edward V. Robertson (1881–1963), United States Senator from Wyoming
- Ted Robertson (Edward Albert Robertson, 1929–1991), Australian politician
- Edward D. Robertson Jr. (born 1952), chief justice of Missouri Supreme Court

== Others ==
- Edward Robertson (Semitic scholar) (1879–1964), Scottish academic
- Eddie Robertson (1935–1981), Scottish footballer
- Ed Robertson (born 1970), Canadian lead singer of Barenaked Ladies
- Edward C. Robertson (died 1903), American football player and coach

== See also ==
- Edward Roberts (disambiguation)
