= Frank Prescott =

Frank Prescott may refer to:

- Frank Prescott (footballer), English footballer
- Frank C. Prescott, member of the California State Assembly
- Frank L. Prescott, member of the Wisconsin State Assembly
