= Edward Robert =

Edward Robert is a compound given name. Notable people with the name include

- Edward Robert Armstrong (1876–1955), Canadian-born engineer and inventor
- Edward Robert Bulwer-Lytton, 1st Earl of Lytton (1831–1891), English statesman and poet
- Edward Robert Festing (1839–1912), English army officer, chemist, and first Director of the Science Museum
- Edward Robert Harrison (1919–2007), British astronomer and cosmologist
- Edward Robert Hughes (1851–1914), English painter
- Edward Robert King-Harman (1838–1888), Irish landlord, Irish Nationalist and Unionist politician
- Edward Robert Peacock (1871–1962), Canadian merchant banker
- Edward Robert Robson (1836–1917), English architect
- Edward Robert Sellstrom (1916–1942), American Naval aviator
- Edward Robert Sullivan (1826–1899), 5th Baronet of Thames Ditton
- Edward Robert Tregear (1846–1931), New Zealand public servant and scholar

== See also ==
- Ed Roberts (disambiguation)
- Edward Roberts (disambiguation)
