= Albert Tomkin =

English footballer

Personal information
- Full name: Albert Henry Tomkin
- Date of birth: 23 December 1915
- Place of birth: Barrow-in-Furness, England
- Date of death: 3 September 1989 (aged 73)
- Place of death: Barrow-in-Furness, England
- Position: Outside left

Senior career*
Years	Team	Apps	(Gls)
1935–1937	Formby	?	(?)
1937	Tottenham Hotspur	0	(0)
1937	Northfleet United	?	(?)
1937–1939	Tottenham Hotspur	2	(0)
1940	→ Southport (wartime)	?	(?)
	→ Cardiff City (wartime)	?	(?)
	→ Swansea Town (wartime)	?	(?)
	→ Luton Town (wartime).	?	(?)
- * Club domestic league appearances and goals

Albert Henry Tomkin (23 December 1915 – 3 September 1989) was an English professional footballer who played for Formby, Tottenham Hotspur and Northfleet United, and wartime matches for Southport, Cardiff City, Swansea City and Luton Town.

== Football career ==
Tomkin began his career at non-League club Formby. He signed for Tottenham Hotspur in 1937 but moved to the club's "nursery" team Northfleet United before making a first team appearance.

The outside left signed professional forms for Tottenham in December 1937 and was a regular in the 'A' team, graduating to the reserves the following season. He made his breakthrough later the same term with a debut for the first team on 4 February 1939 in a 2–1 home win against Norwich City. It was the first of two league matches he played for Spurs.

When the Second World War broke out in September 1939, the Football League was suspended. Tomkin played one further game for Tottenham before returning to his home town of Southport and enlisting for military service. Whilst there in 1940 he played nine games for Southport. With the Wartime League established, Tomkin enrolled as a guest player for competitors Cardiff City and Swansea Town, as well as Luton Town.

He died in Leyland, Lancashire on 3 September 1989.
