= Formby F.C. =

English association football club

Coordinates: 53°36′16.49″N 2°50′43.08″W

Formby
- Full name: Formby Football Club
- Nickname: The Squirrels
- Founded: 1919 (as Formby United)
- Ground: Brows Lane (1920–2002); Altcar Road (2002–13); Victoria Park, Burscough (2013–14); JMO Sports Park, Skelmersdale (2022-)
- Manager: Bobby Shirley
- League: Liverpool County Premier League Championship Division
- 2025–26: 3rd from 7
Home colours	Away colours

Formby Football Club is an English football club based in Formby, Merseyside. They play in the Liverpool County Premier League Championship Division.

The club previously played in the North West Counties Football League Premier Division in 2013–14. They are members of the Liverpool County Football Association.

== History ==
=== Early years ===
The club were established in 1919 as Formby United. After a year at various pitches in the town they moved to a ground that would be their home for more than 80 years, Brows Lane. Three years later they dropped the 'United' to become simply Formby FC.

After a first season in the Southport & District League, the club competed in the Liverpool and District League, where they were First Division champions in 1924–25. Later they transferred to the Liverpool League, achieving two honours in 1927–28, being finalists in the league's knockout trophy, the RP Houston Cup as well as winning the Barnes Benevolent Cup. In 1929–30 the Squirrels achieved a notable double, winning the RP Houston Cup on 2 May 1930, and just three days later winning the Liverpool County FA Amateur Cup.

In the early 1930s Formby moved on to the I Zingari League. In 1931–32 they were runners-up in the Division Two, then in 1932–33 they were Division Two champions and were promoted to Division One. They won the Liverpool County FA Amateur Cup for the second time in 1934–35. In 1936–37 they were runners-up in Division One.

=== Post-war ===
The years immediately after World War II were something of a golden age for Formby. Now playing in the Liverpool County Combination, for eight out of ten seasons they were winners or runners-up for a trophy and/or league title.

In 1947–48 they won the Liverpool County FA Amateur Cup and were also runners-up in the league. The following season, they won the double, being Liverpool County Combination champions and winning the Liverpool County FA Amateur Cup. In 1949–50 they were losing finalists in the Liverpool County Combination knockout competition, the George Mahon Cup. In 1951–52 they were runners-up in the league and in 1952–53 won the Liverpool County FA Challenge Trophy. The following season they were again runners-up in the league. The 1954–55 season saw the club win the Liverpool County Combination Subsidiary Cup and the following season were again losing finalists in the George Mahon Cup, and once again in 1956–57.

In 1963–64 they won the Liverpool County FA Challenge Cup, and then won the George Mahon Cup in 1964–65 when they were also runners-up in the league and losing finalists in the Liverpool County FA Challenge Cup. In 1967–68 they won the Liverpool County FA Challenge Cup for a third time.

In the 1968–69 season, they joined the Lancashire Combination, finishing in 10th place in the first season. They joined the Cheshire County League in 1971–72.

Formby reached First Round Proper of the 1973–74 FA Cup, where they lost 2–0 at home to Football League Third Division leaders Oldham Athletic. In 1978 they became the first non-league club to win the Liverpool Senior Cup.

=== North West Counties Football League ===
Then in 1982 Formby were founder members of the North West Counties League playing in Division One in the 1982–83 season and finishing in 16th place. In 1984–85 they were again finalists in the Liverpool Senior Cup, losing to Marine. In the 1985–86 season they finished bottom of the table and were relegated to Division Two, where they spent just one season before being promoted back to Division One. Their stay lasted just two seasons, and they were relegated again after finishing bottom in 1988–89.

Formby then spent the next thirteen seasons in Division Two. They won the division's knockout competition, the Lamot Pils Trophy, in 1994–95 and won the league's knockout cup, the Worthington Challenge Trophy, in 2000–01.

At the turn of the century, their ground was sold for development into a swimming pool and leisure centre. They moved to a new ground on the Altcar Road industrial estate but it did not meet league standards in time and they were expelled from the league. They spent 2002–03 in the Liverpool County Football Combination, finishing in ninth place.

The following season, 2003–04, they rejoined the North West Counties Football League in Division Two, finishing in third place and winning promotion to Division One. They struggled at the higher level finishing in 20th in 2004–05, 22nd in 2005–06 (though they avoided relegation) and 21st in 2006–07.

Results improved in 2007–08 when they finished 13th out of 20, equalling their highest-ever placing of 1983–84, and also reached the fourth round of the FA Vase, their best performance to date in the competition, two stages beyond their previous record set in 1996–97.

The following season, 2008–09, they maintained this form, finishing 15th out of 22 and reaching the 2nd round of the FA Vase.

Following a dire start to 2009–10, they appointed former Altrincham player Mark Maddox as manager in September 2009. They finished the season in the same position as the previous year, 15th in a table of 22.

Maddox left in the summer break of 2010 to manage Leigh Genesis and Gary Martindale was hired less than a month before the start of the 2010–11 season. Stepping into a player-manager role, Martindale was a prolific scorer for the club. Despite turning the fortunes of the side around, he resigned in January 2011. He was replaced by a caretaker-manager, Tony Rowan, who quit after only one match (a 10–4 defeat), to be replaced by Michael Joyce. Despite being told he might keep the job if he did well, and subsequently delivering a turnaround in the team's results giving them a comfortable 18th-placed finish, Joyce was not offered the role permanently.

The club were demoted to North West Counties League First Division on 18 June 2011 after being found guilty of a breach of rules regarding a change of entity not being notified to the League or the FA.

=== 2011 rebirth ===
In the close season of summer 2011 the club had an almost complete change of personnel. They got a new chairman/owner, Hugh McAuley, new management of Jim Shirley and assistant Kevin Dally, an entirely new squad of players, and many new backroom staff. Additionally, the club reverted to its traditional colours of gold and royal blue, and the red squirrel badge was reinstated as the club's emblem.

After a mixed 2011–12, Formby won the league Championship in 2012–13 in what they called their 'best ever' season. Numerous records were set for the modern era; striker Jason Carey scored 49 goals, the Squirrels landed their first league title since 1949 winning 28 of their 34 league games. They also got to the NWCFL League Cup final, losing 3–0 to Runcorn Linnets.

However at the end of the season the Altcar Road ground was deemed unfit for their level of football and they were denied promotion. A two-year groundshare deal was agreed with neighbours Burscough for 2013–15.

In 2013–14, they took league and cup honours for the second season running, winning the First Division Trophy and finishing runners up in the First Division, securing promotion to the Premier.

=== Disbandment ===
Despite having had two of the best seasons in the club's history, without a ground or junior teams the organisation was in a precarious state. When manager Jim Shirley resigned for family reasons in the close season it left the club without a basis to continue. They announced their disbanding on 2 June 2014.

=== 2022 season return ===
In March 2022 the team announced they would return to competitive senior football and has been accepted to play in the Liverpool County Premier League Division One for the 2022–23 season with Bobby Shirley as manager, Formby finished 6th in the league and won the Roy Wade Cup (their division's challenge cup) in their first season back.

The following season 2023/24 they narrowly missed out on promotion to the Liverpool County Premier League Premier Division, finishing third.

In 2024/25 finished 5th in the league and won the Roy Wade Cup again. The following season, 2025/26, the Squirrels were Roy Wade Cup finalists and finished third in the league, which was a promotion place that year. Accordingly, they started 2026/27 in the Liverpool County Premier League Premier Division.

== Notable former players ==
Numerous Football League players had a spell at Formby.

- George Bellis defender at Wolves and captain at Burnley began his career at Formby in 1921.
- Albert Tomkin began his career at Formby before moving to Tottenham Hotspur in 1937.
- Harry Hitchen started at Formby in 1946, graduating to Sheffield United where he spent five seasons and won a Second Division championship.
- Tony Evans started his career at Formby playing in the 1972–73 season for the club.
- Formby captain Ben Seddon signed directly to Tranmere Rovers in 1973.
- Alex Russell had a three-year spell at Formby 1975–78.
- Ron Smith played for Formby in the mid-1970s before becoming manager in the early 1980s.
- Ron Yeats, legendary 1960s Liverpool captain, ended his playing career at Formby in the 1977–78 season.
- Geoff Twentyman Jr., defender at Preston North End and Bristol Rovers in the 1980s, and son of Liverpool's 50s defender and 70s chief scout also called Geoff, started his senior playing career at Formby in the late 1970s.
- Hughie McAuley, manager of the Liverpool Under-18 team, played for Formby in the early 1980s. He is the father of Formby's owner in the 2010s, Hugh McAuley.
- George Telfer, Everton forward in the 1970s, played for Formby in 1985.
- Football League player and Burscough all-time hero Gary Martindale was hired as Formby manager in July 2010 but adopted the role of player-manager until his resignation in January 2011.
- Ex-Everton starlet John Paul Kissock had a two-month spell restarting his career at Formby in autumn 2010.
- Former Everton player Adam Farley was signed by Formby in December 2010.
- Rhyl, TNS and Charlton Athletic player Luke Holden had a two-game spell at Formby in February/March 2012. He re-signed for Formby at the start of 2012–13, had a further spell away before signing for a third time in the summer of 2013.
- Ray Putterill, a product of Liverpool's academy and briefly a first team squad member, signed for Formby in summer 2013.
- Ben Garrity of Blackpool and Port Vale had a spell with Formby when he was 16 in 2013.

== Honours ==
=== League ===
- Liverpool and District League First Division champions: 1924–25
- I Zingari League Division Two champions: 1932–33
- Liverpool County Combination champions: 1948–49
- North West Counties League Division One champions: 2012–13

=== Cup ===
- Barnes Benevolent Cup winners: 1928
- RP Houston Cup (Liverpool League knockout cup) winners: 1930
- Liverpool County FA Amateur Cup winners: 1929–30, 1947–48, 1948–49
- I Zingari League challenge cup winners (shared with Earle FC): 1933
- Lancashire County FA Amateur Cup winners: 1934–35
- Liverpool County FA Challenge Cup winners: 1951–52, 1963–64, 1967–68
- Liverpool County Combination Subsidiary Cup winners: 1954–55
- George Mahon Cup (Liverpool County Combination knockout cup) winners: 1964–65
- Liverpool Senior Cup winners: 1977–78
- NWCFL First Division Trophy winners: 1994–95, 2013–14
- NWCFL Challenge Cup (Worthington Challenge Trophy) winners: 2000–01
- Roy Wade Cup winners: 2022–2023, 2024–25

=== Best Performances ===
- FA Cup: First Round Proper, 1973–74
- FA Trophy: 1st Round Proper (2nd replay), 1973–74
- FA Vase: Fourth Round Proper, 2007–08
- North West Counties Football League: 13th place in Premier Division, 1983–84, 2007–08

== League history ==
Season	Pld	W	D	L	GF	GA	GD	Pts	Pos	League	Significant Events
Joined Lancashire Combination upon league re-organisation
1968–69	42	17	7	18	82	72	10	41	10/22	Lancs Com	
1969–70	38	13	7	18	48	71	−23	33	12/20	Lancs Com	
1970–71	30	15	7	8	47	35	12	37	5/16	Lancs Com	
Joined Cheshire County League
1971–72	42	11	10	21	61	92	−31	32	20/22	Ches	
1972–73	42	17	12	13	60	64	−4	46	8/22	Ches	
1973–74	42	17	12	13	62	53	9	46	7/22	Ches	
1974–75	42	16	13	13	55	55	0	45	9/22	Ches	
1975–76	42	10	15	17	44	59	−15	35	15/22	Ches	
1976–77	42	17	9	16	59	56	3	43	9/22	Ches	
1977–78	42	18	11	13	71	57	14	47	10/22	Ches	
Cheshire County League added Division Two; Formby play in Division One
1978–79	42	20	9	13	73	57	16	49	8/22	Ches-1	
1979–80	38	13	7	18	50	58	−8	33	16/20	Ches-1	
1980–81	38	21	7	10	65	39	26	49	4/20	Ches-1	
1981–82	38	12	11	15	42	55	13	35	12/20	Ches-1	
Joined North West Counties League Premier Division (then called Division One) as founder members
1982–83	38	10	8	20	48	69	−20	28	16/20	NWCL-1	
1983–84	38	14	7	17	48	61	−13	35	13/20	NWCL-1	
1984–85	38	9	9	20	41	79	−38	25*	17/20	NWCL-1	
1985–86	38	5	8	25	35	86	−51	18	20/20	NWCL-1	Relegated
North West Counties League Division One (then called Division Two)
1986–87	34	13	7	14	54	55	−1	33	11/18	NWCL-2	Promoted
North West Counties Football League Premier Division (then called Division One)
1987–88	34	6	10	18	32	63	−31	22	14/18	NWCL-1	
1988–89	34	3	4	27	24	77	−53	10	18/18	NWCL-1	Relegated
North West Counties Football League First Division (then called Division Two)
1989–90	30	7	7	16	33	57	−24	28	12/16	NWCL-2	
1990–91	34	5	9	20	46	63	−17	24	17/18	NWCL-2	
1991–92	34	17	5	12	49	39	10	56	5/18	NWCL-2	
1992–93	34	14	9	11	49	49	0	51	8/18	NWCL-2	
1993–94	34	12	11	11	59	50	9	47	10/18	NWCL-2	
1994–95	30	11	6	13	57	53	4	39	10/16	NWCL-2	
1995–96	34	10	7	17	59	76	−17	37	13/18	NWCL-2	
1996–97	38	21	6	11	86	57	29	69	7/20	NWCL-2	
1997–98	40	22	7	11	90	63	27	73	6/21	NWCL-2	
1998–99	36	17	7	12	81	59	22	58	7/19	NWCL-2	
1999–2000	34	12	8	14	52	68	16	44	11/18	NWCL-2	
2000–01	38	15	8	15	65	56	9	53	12/20	NWCL-2	
2001–02	40	21	14	5	76	39	37	77	5/21	NWCL-2	Relegated
Relegated to Liverpool County Combination due to ground inadequacies
2002–03	34	14	7	14	74	72	2	49	9/18	LCC	Promoted
Returned to North West Counties Football League First Division (then called Division Two)
2003–04	38	21	9	8	86	48	38	72	3/20	NWCL-2	Promoted
North West Counties Football League Premier Division (then called Division One)
2004–05	42	8	8	26	47	99	−52	32	20/22	NWCL-1	
2005–06	42	4	7	31	43	105	−62	19	22/22	NWCL-1	
2006–07	42	6	4	32	43	111	−68	22	21/22	NWCL-1	
2007–08	38	14	3	21	52	60	−8	42*	13/22	NWCL-1	
North West Counties Football League Premier Division
2008–09	42	15	3	24	57	67	−10	48	15/22	NWCL-1	
2009–10	42	14	3	25	57	81	−24	45	15/22	NWCL-1	
2010–11	42	11	10	21	67	95	−28	43	18/22	NWCL-1	Demoted
North West Counties Football League First Division
2011–12	34	13	4	17	72	69	3	43	11/18	NWCL-2	
2012–13	34	28	2	4	117	42	75	86	1/18	NWCL-2	Champions
2013–14	36	26	6	4	97	37	60	84	2/19	NWCL-2	Resigned
Liverpool County Premier League Championship Division
2022–23	26	16	2	8	58	44	14	50	6/14	LCPL-Ch	
2023–24	24	16	2	6	59	43	16	50	3/13	LCPL-Ch	
2024–25	30	14	5	11	63	59	4	47	5/11	LCPL-Ch	
2025-26	12	7	1	4	33	20	13	22	3/10	LCPL-Ch	Promoted

== Attendances ==
=== Averages ===
The average league-game attendance at Victoria Park for the 2013–14 season was 58.

Past averages for home league games:

- 2012–13: 52
- 2011–12: 39
- 2010–11: 55
- 2009–10: 61
- 2008–09: 42
- 2007–08: 72
- 2006–07: 70
- 2005–06: 53
- 2004–05: 71
- 2003–04: 69

Source: Tony Kempster's site Non League Matters NW Counties Football League site
