= Ed Roberts =

Ed Roberts may refer to:

- Ed Roberts (activist) (1939–1995), American leader of the disability rights movement
- Ed Roberts (computer engineer) (1941–2010), American computer pioneer
- Ed Roberts (poet) (born 1958), American poet, writer and publisher
- Ed Roberts (Emmerdale), fictional character on the television series Emmerdale

== See also ==
- Eddie Roberts (disambiguation)
- Ed Robertson (born 1970), Canadian lead singer of Barenaked Ladies
- Edward Roberts (disambiguation)
- Edwin Roberts (disambiguation)
