= Harry Hitchen =

English footballer

Personal information
- Full name: Henry Hitchen
- Date of birth: 22 October 1922
- Place of birth: Liverpool, England
- Date of death: 9 April 1993 (aged 70)
- Place of death: Knowsley, England
- Height: 6 ft 0 in (1.83 m)
- Position: Central defender

Senior career*
Years	Team	Apps	(Gls)
1946	Formby		
1946–48	New Brighton	70	(2)
1948–53	Sheffield United	154	(15)
1953–54	Bury	2	(0)
1954	Wigan Athletic		
Medal record
Sheffield United
Winner	Second Division	1953
- * Club domestic league appearances and goals

Henry Hitchen (22 October 1922 – 9 April 1993) was a professional footballer who played as a central defender in the Football League. Born in Liverpool he represented local side Formby as an amateur before joining New Brighton. After turning professional he joined Sheffield United before finishing his league career with Bury.

== Early life ==
Growing up in Catherine Street, in Bootle, Liverpool, Hitchen played in local junior football for St Elizabeth's. His playing days were interrupted for service during World War II as a Royal Marine Commando in Burma, China and Egypt.

== Playing career ==
Following the end of the war, Hitchen was playing at centre-half for Formby as an amateur, when he crossed the River Mersey to join Third Division club New Brighton in September 1946, and within weeks made his Football League debut. Outstanding displays for the best part of two seasons persuaded First Division side Sheffield United to part with £3,000 for Hitchen's services in the summer of 1948.

Despite being a natural defender, manager Teddy Davison opted to play Hitchen as a centre forward for his debut against Portsmouth in September 1948. Hitchen struggled with his new role and it was not until February of the following year that he became a regular in defence. Although United were relegated at the end of his first term, Hitchen retained his place for three seasons, and was eventually appointed team captain. Hitchen won a Second Division championship medal in 1952–53, but had fractured his leg in January 1953 and played in only sixteen games.

Following his injury problems, Hitchen moved to Bury in the summer of 1953, but made only two appearances before returning to Non-League football, this time in the Lancashire Combination with Wigan Athletic.

== Death ==
Hitchen died in Knowsley, Merseyside in April 1993, aged 70.
