= Eddie Roberts =

Eddie Roberts may refer to:

- Eddie Roberts (boxer) (1903–1968), American boxer
- Eddie Roberts (footballer) (born 1947), English footballer
- Eddie Roberts Chifundo, Panamanian footballer with C.D. Árabe Unido
- Eddie Roberts, musician with The New Mastersounds
- Eddie Roberts, American ice hockey player with the Pittsburgh Victorias, 1902–1904
- Eddy Roberts, American soccer player

== See also ==
- The Life and Times of Eddie Roberts, an American sitcom in 1980
