= The Ibsen Cycle =

1975 book by Brian Johnston

- Author: Brian Johnston (literary researcher)
- Publication date: 1975

The Ibsen Cycle: The Design of the Plays from Pillars of Society to When We Dead Awaken (1975, revised 1992) is a book by the British literary researcher and Ibsen scholar Brian Johnston (1932–2013). Johnston emphasizes the impact of the German philosopher G.W.F. Hegel (1770–1831) on the final twelve realistic contemporary dramas of Henrik Ibsen (1828–1906). In the Introduction to the book he describes his project as "a complete revaluation and reinterpretation of Ibsen’s methods and intentions as the dramatist of the twelve realistic plays from The Pillars of Society (1877) to When We Dead Awaken (1899)" that interprets them as being part of a single literary cycle that is based on the philosophical ideas of Hegel and follows the structure of Hegel's book The Phenomenology of Mind.

In the foreword to the revised version of The Ibsen Cycle, the American translator of Ibsen and founding president of the Ibsen Society of America, Rolf Fjelde, writes on the influence of Johnston's work: "[I]t is difficult to imagine a time when its influence was prevalent and its argument not widely discussed. ... Johnston ... has permanently altered both the tradition and the prospects of Anglo-American Ibsen criticism by redefining the magnitude of his achievement."
