= Robert Clark (footballer, born 1903) =

English footballer

Personal information
- Date of birth: 6 February 1903
- Place of birth: Newburn, England
- Date of death: 1970 (aged 66–67)
- Height: 5 ft 10 in (1.78 m)
- Position: Forward

Senior career*
Years	Team	Apps	(Gls)
1919–1920	Spencer's Welfare		
1920–1921	Hawthorn Leslie		
1921–1922	Newburn Grange		
1922–1923	Prudhoe Castle		
1923–1928	Newcastle United	77	(16)
1928–1931	Liverpool	39	(11)
1931–1932	Nottingham Forest	5	(2)
1932	North Shields		
- * Club domestic league appearances and goals

Robert Clark (6 February 1903 – 1970) was an English footballer who played as a forward for Newcastle United, Liverpool and Nottingham Forest in the Football League.

Clark played for Newcastle United before he signed for Liverpool, where he played 77 matches and scored 16 goals in five seasons. He moved to Liverpool during the 1927–28 season for a transfer fee of £3,000 (equivalent to £162,947 in 2025). He only made two appearances that season, but he made 32 the following season, scoring nine goals. He only featured five more times during the next two seasons, and he moved to Nottingham Forest on 3 July 1931. He made five league appearances for Forest and scored two goals. In 1932, Clark joined North Shields.
