= Scotland national football B team =

National association football B team

Scotland
- Association: Scottish Football Association
- FIFA code: SCO
First colours	Second colours

First international
- France B 0–0 Scotland B (Toulouse, France; 11 November 1952)

Biggest win
- Scotland B 4–0 Wales B (Cumbernauld, Scotland; 24 March 1998)

Biggest defeat
- England B 4–0 Scotland B (Birmingham, England; 6 February 1957)

The Scotland national football B team, controlled by the Scottish Football Association, is run occasionally as a second team for the Scotland national football team. During the period when Berti Vogts was manager of the national team, it was also known as the Scotland Future team.

== Concept and history ==
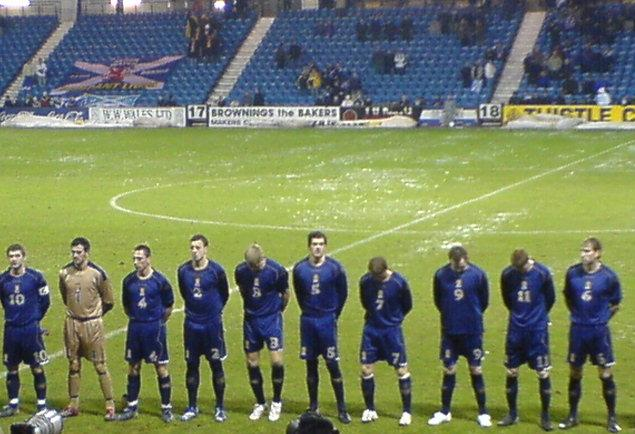
Scotland B team line up ahead of a match against Finland B at Rugby Park, Kilmarnock.

A national B team is designed to give games to players who are being considered for call-up to the full national squad. Generally, the team plays in friendly matches against other international B teams. These games are often played at smaller venues than the full national team play at, with attendances generally under 10,000.

The team is also sometimes referred to as the Scotland Future team, a concept initiated by Berti Vogts. The team competed in the Future Team Cup in 2002–03 and from 2004 to 2006. Following the departure of Berti Vogts in 2004, Scotland's next manager Walter Smith stated his intention to stop playing these matches due to fixture congestion and the number of player withdrawals. Since 2006, there have been four official B internationals played by Scotland.

The first Scotland B game was held on 11 November 1952 and was a 0–0 draw with France B in Toulouse. As of April 2019, the Scotland B side have played 27 games. The most recent match was against Northern Ireland on 6 May 2009. The squad selection was restricted by two Scottish Premier League games being scheduled for the following day, and an upcoming Old Firm match. George Boyd was added to the squad after his eligibility to play for Scotland was confirmed. Six players withdrew from the original squad and four players were added to fill the gaps left behind. Scotland B won the match 3–0 thanks to goals by Andy Webster, George Boyd and Leigh Griffiths.

=== Tournament history ===
Year	Competition	Result	GP	W	D*	L	GS	GA	Ref
2002–03	Future Team Cup	Third	4	0	3	1	5	6	
2004–06	Future Team Cup	Fourth	4	1	0	3	5	8	

== Results and fixtures ==
Date	Opponents	Venue	Score	Scotland goalscorer(s)	Match Report
11 November 1952	France	Stadium Municipal, Toulouse	0–0	—	
11 March 1953	England	Easter Road, Edinburgh	2–2	Ian McMillan; Angus Morrison	
3 March 1954	England	Roker Park, Sunderland	1–1	John Cumming	
21 February 1955	Scotland A (unofficial trial)	Easter Road, Edinburgh	3–2	Johnny Davidson (2); Tommy Gemmell	(Note: This was a trial preceding a scheduled 'B international' between Scotland and England due to be played in Glasgow a few weeks later, however that match was cancelled due to weather conditions.)
29 February 1956	England	Dens Park, Dundee	2–2	Willie McCulloch; Jimmy Mulkerrin	
6 February 1957	England	St Andrew's, Birmingham	1–4	Ian Gardiner	
28 April 1987	France	Pittodrie Stadium, Aberdeen	1–1	Gary McAllister	
27 March 1990	Yugoslavia	Fir Park, Motherwell	0–0	—	
24 April 1990	East Germany	McDiarmid Park, Perth	1–2	Ray Stephen	
2 February 1994	Wales	Racecourse Ground, Wrexham	1–2	Chris McCart	
21 February 1995	Northern Ireland	Easter Road, Edinburgh	3–0	Steven Tweed; Darren Jackson; Stephen Wright	
10 October 1995	Sweden	Råsunda Stadium, Stockholm	2–1	Duncan Shearer; Tom Brown	
23 April 1996	Denmark	Nykøbing Falster Stadium, Nykøbing Falster	0–3	—	
24 March 1998	Wales	Broadwood Stadium, Cumbernauld	4–0	Martin McIntosh; Alec Cleland; Paul Wright; Colin Cameron	
21 April 1998	Norway	Tynecastle Stadium, Edinburgh	1–2	Stephen Crawford	
17 December 2002	Germany	Stadion am Bruchweg, Mainz	3–3	Kevin Kyle; Stephen Hughes; Bob Malcolm	
25 February 2003	Turkey	Atatürk Stadium, Antalya	1–1	Andy Gray	
20 May 2003	Northern Ireland	Firhill Stadium, Glasgow	2–1	Don Hutchison; Kevin Kyle	
21 October 2003	Germany	Pittodrie Stadium, Aberdeen	0–1	—	
10 December 2003	Turkey	Tannadice Park, Dundee	1–1	Steven Caldwell	
7 December 2004	Germany	Carl-Benz-Stadion, Mannheim	0–3	—	
19 April 2005	Austria	Pappelstadion, Mattersburg	1–2	Craig Beattie	
6 December 2005	Poland	Rugby Park, Kilmarnock	2–0	Gary McDonald; Lee Miller	
15 March 2006	Turkey	Caledonian Stadium, Inverness	2–3	Steven Naismith; Lee Miller	
14 November 2006	Republic of Ireland	Dalymount Park, Dublin	0–0	—	
7 February 2007	Finland	Rugby Park, Kilmarnock	2–2	Shaun Maloney; Alan Gow	
20 November 2007	Republic of Ireland	Excelsior Stadium, Airdrie	1–1	Steve Howard	
6 May 2009	Northern Ireland	Broadwood Stadium, Cumbernauld	3–0	Andy Webster; George Boyd; Leigh Griffiths	

== Managerial summary ==
Name	Years	Played	Won	Drawn	Lost	%W	%D	%L
selection committee	1952–57	5	0	4	1	0	80	20
Andy Roxburgh	1987–90	3	0	2	1	0	66.67	33.33
Craig Brown	1994–95	2	1	0	1	50	0	50
Tommy Burns	1995–98	4	2	0	2	50	0	50
Berti Vogts	2002–03	5	1	3	1	20	60	20
Walter Smith	2004–06	5	1	1	3	20	20	80
Alex McLeish	2007	2	0	2	0	0	100	0
George Burley	2009	1	1	0	0	100	0	0
Totals		27	6	12	9	22.22	44.44	33.33
