= Bernard Molyneux =

English footballer

Personal information
- Full name: Bernard Molyneux
- Date of birth: 17 September 1933 (age 93)
- Place of birth: Prescot, England
- Position: Full back

Senior career*
Years	Team	Apps	(Gls)
1956–1957	Tranmere Rovers	12	(3)
- * Club domestic league appearances and goals

Bernard Molyneux (born 17 September 1933) is an English footballer, who played as a full back in the Football League for Tranmere Rovers.
