= Stuart Heap =

English footballer

Personal information
- Full name: Stuart Heap
- Date of birth: 7 February 1965 (age 61)
- Place of birth: Nelson, England
- Position: Midfielder

Senior career*
Years	Team	Apps	(Gls)
1984–1985	Tranmere Rovers	3	(0)
- * Club domestic league appearances and goals

Stuart Heap (born 7 February 1965) is an English footballer, who played as a midfielder in the Football League for Tranmere Rovers.
