= Alex South =

English footballer (1931–2024)

Personal information
- Date of birth: 7 January 1931
- Place of birth: Brighton, England
- Date of death: 17 January 2024 (aged 93)
- Position: Defender

Senior career*
Years	Team	Apps	(Gls)
1947–1948	Whitehawk		
1949–1954	Brighton & Hove Albion	81	(4)
1954–1956	Liverpool	6	(1)
1956–1965	Halifax Town	302	
- * Club domestic league appearances and goals

Alex South (7 January 1931 – 17 January 2024) was an English footballer who played as a defender.

Born on 7 January 1931, South grew up in Whitehawk, East Brighton, attending the local primary and secondary schools. He was a talented boxer as a boy. He joined the Brighton & Hove Albion ground staff as a 15-year old and was part of the Whitehawk & Manor Farm Boys Club team that won the Sussex Minor (Youth) Cup the same season. He played for Whitehawk in the 1947–48 season when they finished title winners of the Brighton & Hove District League Division 4, before turning professional with the Seagulls.

South was signed by his former Albion manager Don Welsh at Liverpool for £5,000 on 10 December 1954. He made his debut in an FA Cup third round replay at Anfield against Lincoln City on 10 January 1955, followed by six further league appearances. He scored his only goal for Liverpool in a 4–4 home draw with Luton Town on 2 April 1955. After his contract expired at Anfield, South joined Halifax Town, going on to make over 300 appearances before retiring in 1965.

South died on 17 January 2024, at the age of 93. At the time of his death, he was Liverpool's second-oldest living player.
