= Ben Seddon =

English footballer (born 1952)

Personal information
- Full name: Ben Seddon
- Date of birth: 5 February 1952 (age 74)
- Place of birth: Liverpool, England
- Position: Central defender

Senior career*
Years	Team	Apps	(Gls)
- Southport
1972–1973	Formby	54	(7)
1973–1974	Tranmere Rovers	1	(0)
1973–1974	Wigan Athletic	7	(1)
1974–1980	Stafford Rangers	334	(49)
1980–1982	Runcorn		
1982–1983	Macclesfield Town	35	(5)
1983–1984	Southport	57	(2)
1984	Newton		
1984	South Liverpool		
- * Club domestic league appearances and goals

Ben Seddon (born 5 February 1952) is a footballer who played as a central defender in the Football League for Tranmere Rovers.

As a teenager, Seddon represented Bootle Schoolboys who reached the W R Williams Memorial Cup Final, when his team played against the English Trophy finalists Liverpool at Anfield in front of 1,561 spectators and won.

Upon leaving school, Seddon signed for Southport FC Reserves and was an ever present in a team which played in then Lancashire League/Northern Floodlit League for the A and B teams. Playing in the team was a young teammate Peter Withe, who later went on to win the European Cup playing for Aston Villa.

In the 1971–72 season, Seddon joined Formby, who then played in the Cheshire League. He scored on his debut on 29 January 1972, the only goal in a 5–1 home defeat at the hands of a Droylsden side whose striker, also called Seddon, bagged a hat trick. At the end of the season he had so impressed the management that he became the fourth player on the books to be paid. Early in the following season, despite his youth, he was promoted to club captain, running out as skipper for the first time on 9 September at Sandbach Ramblers. It was during his time at Formby FC that former Liverpool captain and the then manager of Tranmere Rovers, Ron Yeats offered Seddon a professional contract.

On 18 April 1973 at the age of 21, Seddon signed professional forms at Tranmere Rovers who were then playing in the old Third Division, with big Ron at the time being quoted as saying "I have searched as far afield as Scotland for a new centre half and may have found my successor on my own doorstep, this lad has all the makings of a useful centre half. He is tall, very good in the air, and strong in a tackle. He has impressed me more than anyone else and I feel sure that he will develop into a first class player."

In the team at that time were Ronnie Moore, Steve Coppell, Ray Mathias, Mark Palios but to name a few. Seddon made his league debut with on 25 August 1973 away to Aldershot. Seddon's first goal came for Tranmere in a reserve game against Chester, with Steve Coppell scoring in the same game.

Despite appearing in the league for Tranmere and the Cup, Seddon later requested to be placed on the transfer list whilst at the club in the second season and was put out on a two-month loan at Wigan Athletic, playing seven games and scoring one goal. It was then that Seddon was spotted by Roy Chapman (Father of Lee Chapman ex Leeds United) who was the manager of Stafford Rangers. Stafford Rangers were then playing in the top flight of non-league football. Seddon signed at Stafford Rangers at the age of 22 and made his debut on 17 March 1974 at home to Barrow (Rangers won 3–1). During the course of Seddon's first season at Stafford, his team went on an unbeaten run in the FA Cup of 11 matches, on the way beating Belper Town, Macclesfield Town, Burton Albion and King's Lynn in four qualifying rounds, then beating Football League clubs Stockport County, Halifax Town and Rotherham United in the first three rounds of the competition proper.

The reward for his team's victory came in a game against Peterborough United on 25 January 1975 in the FA Cup fourth round. Due to the interest surrounding the game, the match was switched to the Victoria Ground, home of Stoke City FC, with the game being played in front of a 31,160 crowd. His team made the history books that day when they were the first Northern Premier League team to play in the fourth round of the FA Cup. His team lost that day 2–1.

Thereafter, Seddon went on to play in two Wembley finals, the first taking place on 24 April 1976 in the F.A. Challenge Trophy against Scarborough FC, the first ending in a 3–2 defeat. Seddon returned to Wembley in 1979 in the FA Trophy, this time against Kettering Town and his team ran out 2–0 winners in front of a then record crowd of 32,000.

On 24 November 1979, Stafford reached the FA Cup second round, this time playing against Blackburn Rovers with the game being played at Ewood Park, in goal for the opposition that day was his former teammate Jim Arnold. Seddon played his last game for Stafford at home to Wealdstone on 22 March 1980, having played 331 games and scoring 49 goals from centre half.

In 1980 and at 28 years of age and after a six-year stay at the Stafford, Seddon was signed by Runcorn who paid a fee of £2000 with the club statement saying at the time "He's worth every penny of it and may well turn out to be the club's best buy of the season, Ben is a man of steel, has an excellent reputation coupled with a phenomenal goal scoring record as a defender".

Whilst at Runcorn his team achieved the treble in 1980–81, lifting the NPL Championship, NPL Cup and the NPL Shield and are promoted once again to the Alliance Premier League when his team shocked the football fraternity in 1981–82 by winning the title at their first attempt and the right to be promoted into the football league, only for entry later on to be refused by the Football League due to ground grading requirements. That season, his team lost just five games amassing 93 points to secure the title. Runcorn reach the first round of the FA Cup playing against Burnley FC at Canal Street.

In the 1982–83 season, Seddon signed for Macclesfield Town playing over 35 games scoring 5 goals.

In the 1983–84 season, Seddon returned to his first club Southport FC playing 57 games and scoring two goals and being one of three players that season to make the most appearances.

Seddon briefly moved to Newtown before a last stint in paid football when his old manager from Formby, Bryan Griffiths, signed him to the club he now managed, South Liverpool in 1984. He retired from paid football that season.
