= Pat Finlay =

English footballer

Personal information
- Full name: Patrick Finlay
- Date of birth: 18 March 1938 (age 88)
- Place of birth: Birkenhead, England
- Position: Winger

Senior career*
Years	Team	Apps	(Gls)
1961–1962	Tranmere Rovers	3	(0)
- * Club domestic league appearances and goals

Pat Finlay (born 18 March 1938) is an English footballer, who played as a winger in the Football League for Tranmere Rovers.
