= Jim Pollard (footballer) =

English footballer

Personal information
- Full name: James Pollard
- Date of birth: 4 June 1926
- Place of birth: Liverpool, England
- Date of death: February 1987 (aged 60)
- Place of death: Liverpool, England
- Position: Winger

Senior career*
Years	Team	Apps	(Gls)
1947–1949	Tranmere Rovers	24	(1)
1949–1952	Wigan Athletic	95	(19)
- * Club domestic league appearances and goals

Jim Pollard (4 June 1926 – February 1987) was an English footballer, who played as a winger in the Football League for Tranmere Rovers. He moved to Wigan Athletic in 1949, where he appeared 95 times in the Lancashire Combination.
