= Steve Whittingham =

English footballer

Personal information
- Full name: Stephen Paul Whittingham
- Date of birth: 4 February 1962 (age 64)
- Place of birth: Wallasey, England
- Position: Forward

Senior career*
Years	Team	Apps	(Gls)
1978–1981	Tranmere Rovers	2	(0)
- * Club domestic league appearances and goals

Steve Whittingham (born 4 February 1962) is an English footballer, who played as a forward in the Football League for Tranmere Rovers. Has two children
