= Mike Edwards (footballer, born 1974) =

English footballer

Personal information
- Date of birth: 10 September 1974 (age 52)
- Place of birth: Bebington, England
- Position: Midfielder

Senior career*
Years	Team	Apps	(Gls)
1994–1995	Tranmere Rovers	22	(0)
- * Club domestic league appearances and goals

Michael Edwards (born 10 September 1974) is an English former footballer, who played as a midfielder in the Football League and Championship for Tranmere Rovers F.C., Mansfield Town F.C., Darlington F.C, Shamrock Rovers, Stalybridge Celtic F.C., Northwich Victoria F.C., Vauxhall Motors F.C., Rhyl FC, and Caernarfon Town F.C.
