= Brian Johnston (literary researcher) =

British literary researcher (1932–2013)

Brian Johnston (14 April 1932 – 2 March 2013) was a British literary researcher, especially renowned for his works on the Norwegian dramatist Henrik Ibsen (1828–1906), including his three influential books, The Ibsen Cycle (1975, revised 1992), To the Third Empire: Ibsen's Early Plays (1980), and Text and Supertext in Ibsen's Drama (1988).

== Life and work ==
Brian Peter Johnston was the second child of Edward Thomas & Hilda Margaret Johnston having an elder brother and three younger sisters. Although he never married, he had very close contact with his extended family. He left school at 13, and had several unskilled jobs including reading gas meters and removing the pips from raspberry jam. He attended college in Birmingham from where he gained a place to read classics at Gonville and Caius College, Cambridge

In 1960, Johnston gained a First Class Honors Degree at Cambridge University, where he taught later in his life, holding a multitude of roles at Trondheim Lærerhøgskole (Norway), Northwestern University, the University of California-Berkeley, the University of Amman (Jordan), Beirut University College (Lebanon), and several other institutions. He joined the faculty of the School of Drama, Carnegie Mellon University, Pittsburgh, in 1986, where he remained until his retirement in 2007.

Johnston edited the Norton Critical Edition of Ibsen's plays published in 2004. His translations of Ibsen include A Doll's House, Ghosts, Hedda Gabler, The Lady from the Sea, Rosmersholm, Emperor and Galilean, and Peer Gynt. They have been produced at major professional theatres across the United States.

His course in dramatic literature from ancient to modern drama is available online on the site Courses in Drama. The essays presented derive from a Survey of Drama Course Johnston taught at Carnegie Mellon University between 1987 and 2007. His discussions, as Johnston terms his essays, are divided into four sections:

1. Greek (Athenian) Drama
2. European Drama (Medieval to Spanish Golden Age)
3. European Drama (Neoclassical to Romantic)
4. Modern Drama – (Ibsen to 20th Century; Modern Arab Drama)

== Hegelian perspective ==
A key to understanding Brian Johnston's interpretation of Ibsen is his emphasis on the importance of the German philosopher G.W.F. Hegel's (1770–1831) influence on Ibsen's drama. In the Introduction to The Ibsen Cycle he describes his project as follows:

This book undertakes a complete revaluation and reinterpretation of Ibsen's methods and intentions as the dramatist of the twelve realistic plays from The Pillars of Society (1877) to When We Dead Awaken (1899). It follows Ibsen's description by seeing the plays as a single cycle "with mutual connections between the plays" and it demonstrates that this single cyclical structure is based upon the one great intellectual structure of reality available to Ibsen in the nineteenth century: the philosophical system of Hegel. The novelty does not lie in attributing to Hegel a strong influence upon Ibsen's thought and art, for, though by no means generally accepted by interpreters of Ibsen, this has, at least, been recognized by a number of scholars and critics from the time of John C. Pearce's essay "Hegelian Ideas in Three Tragedies by Ibsen." What is new in the present study is the discovery that the realistic plays are structured directly upon Hegel’s major philosophical work, The Phenomenology of Mind, and that the sequence of dialectical dramas in Hegel’s account of the evolution of human consciousness is paralleled in the sequence of dialectical dramas in Ibsen’s Cycle.

== Storehouse of Western civilisation ==
Johnston insists that there are rich and wide-ranging references to the whole of Western civilisation in Ibsen's final twelve contemporary plays. He contends that the plays are structured with references to the 'three major spiritual traditions' of the West— 'the Hellenic, the Judeo-Christian, and the Germanic':

The reader will find in the following pages that not only do I find in Ibsen's drama a direct relation to Hegelian philosophy, but that I also insist that Ibsen's Cycle draws upon the whole rich storehouse of Western civilization. This partly can be explained by the fact that Hegel, too, is drawing upon this same storehouse so that to employ Hegel is to employ a multitude of sources. Ibsen, I believe, saw himself as coming at the end of a whole development of the European spirit, and, like Hegel, of summing up its entire content, but in the form of ambitious dramatic artworks, from Brand onwards. Thus, the account of Ibsen that emerges from the following pages draws into the analysis of his art the intellectual heritage of the West—the entirety of human history—as far as the present writer is able to encompass this. This suggests that Ibsen's art is as rich in reference as that of Thomas Mann, James Joyce, T. S. Eliot, Ezra Pound, Samuel Beckett, and the many writers and artists of this modernist tradition.
