= Stan Thomas (association footballer) =

English footballer

Personal information
- Full name: Stanley Herbert Thomas
- Date of birth: 5 September 1919
- Place of birth: Birkenhead, England
- Date of death: 1985 (aged 65–66)
- Place of death: Taunton, England
- Position: Inside forward

Senior career*
Years	Team	Apps	(Gls)
1948–1949	Tranmere Rovers	1	(0)
- * Club domestic league appearances and goals

Stan Thomas (5 September 1919 – October 1985) was an English footballer, who played as an inside forward in the Football League for Tranmere Rovers.
