= Charles Horwood =

English cricketer

Personal information
- Full name: Charles Horwood
- Born: 8 December 1839; Berkhamsted, Hertfordshire, England
- Died: 7 January 1870 (aged 30); Broadwater, Sussex, England
- Batting: Right-handed
- Bowling: Right-arm roundarm

Domestic team information
- Years: Team
- 1864–1865: Sussex

Career statistics
Competition	First-class
Matches	3
Runs scored	23
Batting average	7.66
100s/50s	–/–
Top score	12*
Balls bowled	–
Wickets	–
Bowling average	–
5 wickets in innings	–
10 wickets in match	–
Best bowling	–
Catches/stumpings	3/–
- Source: Cricinfo, 1 July 2012

Charles Horwood (8 December 1839 – 7 January 1870) was an English cricketer. Horwood was a right-handed batsman who bowled right-arm roundarm, although his exact bowling style is not known. He was born at Berkhamsted, Hertfordshire.

== Career ==
Horwood made his first-class debut for Sussex against Hampshire in 1864 at Day's Ground, Southampton. He made further first-class appearances for Sussex, one in 1864 in a return fixture against Hampshire at the Royal Brunswick Ground, Hove, and a second against Nottinghamshire at Trent Bridge in 1865. He was unsuccessful in his three matches, scoring 23 runs at an average of 7.66, with a high score of 12 not out.

He died at the Manor House at Broadwater, Sussex, on 7 January 1870.
