= Reg McGuire =

English footballer

Personal information
- Full name: Reginald McGuire
- Date of birth: 24 August 1959 (age 67)
- Place of birth: Birkenhead, England
- Position: Forward

Senior career*
Years	Team	Apps	(Gls)
1982–1983	Tranmere Rovers	4	(0)
- * Club domestic league appearances and goals

Reg McGuire (born 24 August 1959) is an English footballer, who played as a forward in the Football League for Tranmere Rovers, having previously been at Cammell Laird, and in the Sunday leagues. He then moved on to Bangor City F.C., where he played European football. He is the father of ex-Fleetwood Town and Mansfield Town midfielder Jamie McGuire.
