= Tommy Williams (footballer, born 1929) =

English footballer

Personal information
- Full name: Tommy Williams
- Date of birth: 1 August 1929
- Place of birth: Garston, England
- Date of death: 29 October 1979 (aged 50)
- Place of death: Chester, Cheshire, England
- Position: Wing half

Senior career*
Years	Team	Apps	(Gls)
1946–1957	Tranmere Rovers	53	(2)
1958–1959	Southport	17	(0)
- Bangor City
Total		70	(2)
- * Club domestic league appearances and goals

Tommy Williams was a footballer who played as a wing half in the Football League for Tranmere Rovers.
