= Brian Johnson (Australian footballer) =

Australian rules footballer

Personal information
- Full name: Brian Johnson
- Born: 22 September 1932
- Died: 4 May 2015 (aged 82)
- Original teams: Mildura, University Blacks
- Height: 188 cm (6 ft 2 in)
- Weight: 83 kg (183 lb)

Playing career^{1}
Years	Club	Games (Goals)
1953–56	North Melbourne	44 (6)
- ^{1} Playing statistics correct to the end of 1956.

Brian Johnson (22 September 1932 – 4 May 2015) was an Australian rules footballer who played with North Melbourne in the Victorian Football League (VFL).

Johnson lost the sight in one eye and the other eye was badly affected as a result of a knock to the head against Essendon on Saturday, 28 April 1956.

$8500 was raised by a public appeal to assist Johnson and his young family after his eye injury.
