= Ian McMullen =

English footballer

Personal information
- Full name: Ian McMullen
- Date of birth: 17 November 1965 (age 60)
- Place of birth: Hoylake, England
- Position: Midfielder

Senior career*
Years	Team	Apps	(Gls)
1984–1985	Tranmere Rovers	2	(0)
- * Club domestic league appearances and goals

Ian McMullen (born 17 November 1965) is an English footballer, who played as a midfielder in the Football League for Tranmere Rovers.
