= Eric Hornby =

English footballer (1923–2018)

Personal information
- Date of birth: 31 March 1923
- Place of birth: Birkenhead, England
- Date of death: 29 January 2018 (aged 94)
- Position: Full back

Senior career*
Years	Team	Apps	(Gls)
1944–1949	Tranmere Rovers	32	(0)
1949–1951	Crewe Alexandra	4	(0)
Total		36	(0)
- * Club domestic league appearances and goals

Eric Hornby (31 March 1923 – 29 January 2018) was an English footballer, who played as a full back in the Football League for Tranmere Rovers and Crewe Alexandra.
