= Jimmy Mulkerrin =

Scottish footballer

Jimmy Mulkerrin (25 December 1931 – May 2015) was a Scottish footballer who played for Hibernian, Accrington Stanley, Tranmere Rovers and Northwich Victoria. Mulkerrin signed for Hibernian in 1950 and made sporadic appearances in seven years with the club, as he mainly substituted for their regular centre forward Lawrie Reilly. He played for Scotland B once, in a 2–2 draw with England B on 29 February 1956.
