= Gerry Casey =

English footballer (1941–2019)

Personal information
- Full name: Gerald Hugh Casey
- Date of birth: 25 August 1941
- Place of birth: Birkenhead, England
- Date of death: 24 June 2019 (aged 77)
- Position: Midfielder

Senior career*
Years	Team	Apps	(Gls)
1967–1970	Tranmere Rovers	52	(5)
- * Club domestic league appearances and goals

Gerry Casey (25 August 1941 — 24 June 2019) was an English footballer, who played as a midfielder in the Football League for Tranmere Rovers.

He is best remembered as one of the Football League's hardest players. He was dismissed for violent conduct in a match against Torquay United in August 1967, just a few minutes into his league debut. This made Casey the first ever player to be sent off on his debut in the Football League.
