= Ally McLellan =

Scottish footballer (1922–2010)

Personal information
- Full name: Alistair Alexander Angus McLellan
- Date of birth: 16 April 1922
- Place of birth: Glasgow, Scotland
- Date of death: September 2010 (aged 88)
- Place of death: Birkenhead, Wirral, England
- Position: Inside forward

Senior career*
Years	Team	Apps	(Gls)
1946–1948	New Brighton	34	(7)
1948–1949	Tranmere Rovers	2	(0)
- Morecambe
Total		36	(7)
- * Club domestic league appearances and goals

Ally McLellan (16 April 1922 – September 2010) was a Scottish footballer who played as an inside forward in the Football League for New Brighton and Tranmere Rovers.
