= David Nightingale =

English footballer

Personal information
- Full name: David Reginald Nightingale
- Date of birth: 15 August 1927
- Place of birth: Liverpool, England
- Date of death: 2013 (aged 85–86)
- Place of death: Adelaide, Australia
- Position: Full back

Senior career*
Years	Team	Apps	(Gls)
1946–1947	Tranmere Rovers	3	(0)
- * Club domestic league appearances and goals

David Reginald Nightingale (15 August 1927 – 2013) was an English footballer, who played as a full back in the Football League for Tranmere Rovers. He died in Adelaide, Australia in 2013.
