= Edward Stanley Roberts =

English cricketer

Edward Roberts
Personal information
- Full name: Edward Stanley Roberts
- Born: 6 May 1890; Oswestry, Shropshire, England
- Died: September 1964 (aged 74); Rhodesia , England

Domestic team information
- Years: Team
- 1925: Worcestershire

Career statistics
Competition	FC
Matches	3
Runs scored	23
Batting average	3.83
100s/50s	0/0
Top score	12
Balls bowled	0
Wickets	0
Bowling average	-
5 wickets in innings	0
10 wickets in match	0
Best bowling	-
Catches/stumpings	2/0
- Source: , 2 August 2008

Edward Stanley Roberts (6 May 1890 – September 1964) was an English first-class cricketer who played three matches for Worcestershire in 1925. He found no success in any of these games.
