= Len Salmon =

English footballer

Personal information
- Full name: Leonard Alexander Salmon
- Date of birth: 24 June 1912
- Place of birth: West Kirby, England
- Date of death: February 1995 (aged 82)
- Place of death: Birkenhead, England
- Position: Wing half

Senior career*
Years	Team	Apps	(Gls)
–1934	Hoylake		
1934–????	New Brighton	30	(2)
–1941	South Liverpool		
1941–1946	Burnley	0	(0)
1946–1948	Tranmere Rovers	30	(1)
- * Club domestic league appearances and goals

Leonard Alexander Salmon (24 June 1912 – February 1995) was an English professional footballer who played in the Football League for New Brighton and Tranmere Rovers as a wing half.
