= Edward Roberts (South African cricketer) =

South African cricketer

Edward Roberts (born 1 July 1903, date of death unknown) was a South African cricketer who appeared in nine first-class matches for Orange Free State in the 1920s.
