= Brian Morley =

English footballer

Personal information
- Date of birth: 4 October 1960 (age 66)
- Place of birth: Fleetwood, England
- Height: 5 ft 7 in (1.70 m)
- Position: Full back

Senior career*
| Years | Team | Apps | (Gls) |
| 1978–1980 | Blackburn Rovers | 20 | (0) |
| 1981–1982 | Tranmere Rovers | 16 | (2) |
- Northwich Victoria
| Total | | 36 | (2) |
- * Club domestic league appearances and goals

Brian Morley is a footballer who played as a full back in the Football League for Tranmere Rovers.
