= Bavin (wood) =

Bavin (wood) was a traditional unit of firewood, a large log.

== Description and use ==
A bavin in the 16thC was a piece of wood standardised as three foot long and two feet round. In Hampshire in the early19thC, its cost was between 6 and 15 shillings per hundred bavins.

Charles Vancouver in 1813 wrote of "Bavins for heating the oven and making a sudden but transient fire". Bavins were used especially by bakers.

== Literary associations ==
Jane Austen in 1814 complained to her sister that “My Mother’s Wood is brought in-but by some mistake, no Bavins. She must therefore buy some”.

== See also ==
- Faggot (unit)
- Fascine
- Withy
