= Ray Pritchard =

English footballer (born 1954)

Personal information
- Full name: Raymond Pritchard
- Date of birth: 23 June 1954 (age 72)
- Place of birth: Liverpool, England
- Position: Full back

Youth career
- Everton

Senior career*
Years	Team	Apps	(Gls)
1972–1974	Tranmere Rovers	14	(0)
1974	→ Southport (loan)	3	(0)
- Marine
Total		17	(0)
- * Club domestic league appearances and goals

Ray Pritchard (born 23 June 1954) is an English footballer, who played as a full back in the Football League for Tranmere Rovers.
