= Edward Roberts (chemist) =

- Citizenship: American
- Education: University of Sussex, Brighton, England; University of Newcastle-upon-Tyne, England
- Occupation: Scientist

Edward Roberts FRSC., is a British-born American scientist with expertise in biochemistry and synthetic organic chemistry. He is recognized for his significant contributions to medicinal chemistry, the design and discovery of new medicines in the development of novel therapeutics.

== Education and early career ==
Edward Roberts pursued his undergraduate studies in biochemistry with a minor in music at the University of Sussex, Brighton, England, earning a Bachelor of Science with Honors degree in 1979. He continued his academic journey with a Ph.D. in synthetic organic chemistry at the University of Newcastle-upon-Tyne, England, under Richard J Stoodley, completing his doctoral studies in 1982.

== Career ==
Roberts worked at the Adden Brookes Hospital Forvie site in Cambridge (UK) for Parke Davis.

Roberts held the position of senior vice president and Head of Chemistry at F. Hoffmann-La Roche in Basel, Switzerland. He further contributed his expertise as a director and Head of Chemistry at AstraZeneca R&D in Montreal, Canada. He was an adjunct professor in the Department of Chemistry at McGill University.

Roberts was the President and Chief Science Officer at Kémia, a drug development company located in San Diego, California. In 2005, he was appointed as a professor in the Departments of Chemistry and Molecular Medicine at Scripps Research in La Jolla, California.

== Contributions to medicinal chemistry since joining Scripps research ==
- Novel treatments for autoimmune disorders: Edward Roberts and his team designed and synthesized a selective and bitopic S1P1 agonist, RPC1063. This compound showed promise as a safe treatment for autoimmune diseases such as multiple sclerosis, ulcerative colitis, and Crohn's disease. Ozanimod (RPC1063), now marketed as Zeposia, has been approved for use in relapsing multiple sclerosis and inflammatory bowel disease.
- Novel treatments for neuropsychiatric and behavioral Disorders: Roberts' lab designed and developed a series of kappa opioid antagonists for stress-related mood disorders, migraine, and other neuropsychiatric conditions. One such antagonist, Navacaprant (formerly CYM-53093, BTRX-335140), exhibited robust efficacy in early clinical trials and is currently in multiple phase 3 trials for major depressive diseases.
- Compounds for use in the treatment of autistic spectrum disorders and/or post-traumatic stress disorders: Roberts' team designed and synthesized novel and improved V1a antagonists for potential therapeutic use in various neuropsychological disorders. One representative molecule NMRA-511 is currently in phase 2 clinical trials.
- Novel compounds for use in fibrotic diseases: Roberts' research explored the therapeutic potential of subtype 3 of the sphingosine-1-phosphate receptors as targets for cardiovascular and pulmonary diseases, fibrosis, and other related conditions.
- Novel compounds for use in seizures; Roberts and colleagues explored the use of Galanin receptor agonists to delay and prevent seizures in animals displaying excellent activity and better mortality outcomes than current first line treatment.

== Patents and recognition ==
Roberts is an inventor or co-inventor on over 100 issued patents. He has received the E.B. Hershberg award and induction into the MEDI Hall of Fame in 2021. He has also been involved in the commercialization of some of his research, contributing to the establishment of biotech companies such as Receptos Pharmaceuticals and BlackThorn Pharmaceuticals. He is a member of the Royal Society of Chemistry, the Royal Society of Medicine, and the Medicinal Chemistry division of the American Chemical Society.
