= Arthur Walls =

Scottish footballer

Personal information
- Full name: Arthur Joseph Walls
- Date of birth: 15 January 1931
- Place of birth: Glasgow, Scotland
- Date of death: 27 July 2006 (aged 75)
- Place of death: Haddington, Scotland
- Position: Inside forward

Youth career
- Kilsyth Rangers

Senior career*
Years	Team	Apps	(Gls)
1953–1954	Airdrieonians	7	(0)
1954–1956	Tranmere Rovers	22	(6)
1957	Macclesfield Town	3	(0)
Total		32	(6)
- * Club domestic league appearances and goals

Arthur Walls was a Scottish footballer, who played as an inside forward in the Football League for Tranmere Rovers.
