= Albert Childs =

English footballer (1930–2026)

Personal information
- Date of birth: 25 September 1930
- Place of birth: Liverpool, England
- Date of death: 23 October 2026 (aged 96)
- Position: Defender

Senior career*
Years	Team	Apps	(Gls)
1950–1953	Northern Nomads		
1953–1954	Liverpool	2	(0)
1954–1958	Bishop Auckland		
- * Club domestic league appearances and goals

Albert Childs (25 September 1930 – 23 October 2026) was an English footballer who played as a defender.

Childs made his Liverpool debut on 19 September 1953 in a 4–0 league win over Burnley at Anfield. He played once more for Liverpool before signing for Bishop Auckland in 1954. Until his death, he was the oldest surviving player to have represented Liverpool.

Childs died on 23 October 2026, aged 96.
