= Norman Ellison (footballer) =

English footballer

Personal information
- Full name: Norman Ellison
- Date of birth: 2 November 1929
- Place of birth: Bebington, England
- Date of death: 1 October 1999 (aged 69)
- Place of death: Bebington, England
- Position: Winger

Senior career*
Years	Team	Apps	(Gls)
1949–1951	Tranmere Rovers	2	(0)
- * Club domestic league appearances and goals

Norman Ellison (2 November 1929 – 1 October 1999) was an English footballer who played as a winger in the Football League for Tranmere Rovers.
