= Ray Pointon =

English footballer

Personal information
- Full name: Raymond Everson Pointon
- Date of birth: 6 November 1947
- Place of birth: Birkenhead, England
- Date of death: 17 July 2013 (aged 65)
- Place of death: Bebington, England
- Position: Defender

Senior career*
Years	Team	Apps	(Gls)
1967–1971	Tranmere Rovers	46	(0)
- * Club domestic league appearances and goals

Ray Pointon (6 November 1947 – 17 July 2013) was an English footballer, who played as a defender in the Football League for Tranmere Rovers.
