= Charlie Birmingham =

English footballer

Personal information
- Full name: Charles Henry Birmingham
- Date of birth: 24 August 1922
- Place of birth: Liverpool, England
- Date of death: 1 January 1993 (aged 70)
- Place of death: Wallasey, England
- Position: Inside forward

Senior career*
Years	Team	Apps	(Gls)
1946–1947	Tranmere Rovers	2	(1)
1947–1948	Macclesfield Town	10	(6)
- * Club domestic league appearances and goals

Charlie Birmingham (24 August 1922 – 1 January 1993) was an English footballer, who played as an inside forward in the Football League for Tranmere Rovers.
