= Harold Jones (footballer) =

English footballer

Personal information
- Full name: Harold Jones
- Date of birth: 22 May 1933
- Place of birth: Liverpool, England
- Date of death: 6 September 2003 (aged 70)
- Place of death: Warrington, England
- Position: Inside forward

Senior career*
Years	Team	Apps	(Gls)
1952–1954	Liverpool	1	(0)
1954–1957	Rhyl		
- * Club domestic league appearances and goals

Harold Jones (22 May 1933 – 6 September 2003) was an English footballer who played as an inside forward in the Football League for Liverpool.
