= Alan Cox (footballer) =

English footballer

Personal information
- Full name: Alan William Cox
- Date of birth: 4 September 1920
- Place of birth: Liverpool, England
- Date of death: 1993 (aged 72–73)
- Place of death: Trafford, England
- Position: Winger

Senior career*
Years	Team	Apps	(Gls)
1946–1948	Tranmere Rovers	8	(1)
- * Club domestic league appearances and goals

Alan William Cox (4 September 1920 – 1993) was an English footballer, who played as a winger in the Football League for Tranmere Rovers.
