= William Horwood =

William Horwood may refer to:

- William Horwood (composer) (c. 1430–1484), English composer and musician
- William Horwood (police commissioner) (1868–1943), Commissioner of the Metropolitan Police
- William Horwood (novelist) (born 1944), English novelist
- William Horwood (by 1504-57 or later), MP for Huntingdon (UK Parliament constituency)
- William Whorwood or Horwood (by 1505–1545), Solicitor General, Attorney General and MP for Downton
- William Horwood (Chief Justice) (1862–1945), Politician and Chief Justice of Newfoundland
