= Hugh McAuley (footballer, born 1976) =

English footballer

Personal information
- Full name: Hugh Francis McAuley
- Date of birth: 13 May 1976 (age 50)
- Place of birth: Plymouth, England
- Position: Midfielder

Youth career
- Liverpool

Senior career*
| Years | Team | Apps | (Gls) |
| 1995–1996 | Northwich Victoria | | |
| 1996–1997 | Conwy United | | |
| 1997 | Southport | | |
| 1997–1999 | Leek Town | | |
| 1999–2003 | Cheltenham Town | 100 | (9) |
| 2003 | Kidderminster Harriers | 4 | (0) |
| 2003–2004 | Northwich Victoria | 1 | (0) |
| 2004 | Forest Green Rovers | 12 | (0) |
| 2004–2005 | Aldershot Town | 26 | (0) |
| 2005 | Forest Green Rovers | 10 | (0) |
| 2005–2006 | Tamworth | 8 | (0) |
| 2005–2006 | → Kettering Town (loan) | | |
| 2006 | Hucknall Town | | |
| 2006 | Leigh RMI | | |
- * Club domestic league appearances and goals

Hugh Francis McAuley (born 13 May 1976) is an English former professional footballer who played as a midfielder. He made 104 appearances in the Football League for Cheltenham Town and Kidderminster Harriers.

He also played for Northwich Victoria, Conwy United, Southport, Leek Town, Forest Green Rovers, Aldershot Town, Tamworth, Kettering Town, Hucknall Town and Leigh RMI. McAuley's father, Hugh, made 205 appearances in the Football League for Tranmere Rovers, Plymouth Argyle, Charlton Athletic and Carlisle United.

McAuley is a director of The Innovation Group, a customised luxury car sourcing company. The company was the sponsor of the football team McAuley and co-director Dave Webster co-owned in the early 2010s, and that McAuley's father Hughie once played for, Formby F.C. In May 2012 McAuley's company agreed a three-year, six figure sponsorship deal with FA WSL club Doncaster Rovers Belles.
