= George Shone =

English footballer

Personal information
- Full name: George Frederick Shone
- Date of birth: 15 February 1922
- Place of birth: Runcorn, England
- Date of death: 2009 (aged 86–87)
- Place of death: Runcorn, England
- Position: Centre forward

Senior career*
Years	Team	Apps	(Gls)
1946–1947	Tranmere Rovers	4	(0)
- * Club domestic league appearances and goals

George Frederick Shone (15 February 1922 – September 2009) was an English footballer, who played as a centre forward in the Football League for Tranmere Rovers.
