= Pat Jackson (footballer) =

English footballer

Personal information
- Full name: William Patrick Jackson
- Date of birth: 8 December 1924
- Place of birth: Liverpool, England
- Date of death: 6 September 1974 (aged 49)
- Place of death: Crosby, England
- Position: Inside forward

Senior career*
Years	Team	Apps	(Gls)
1948–1950	Swindon Town	4	(1)
1951–1954	Tranmere Rovers	14	(1)
Total		18	(2)
- * Club domestic league appearances and goals

Pat Jackson (8 December 1924 – 6 September 1974) was an English footballer, who played as an inside forward in the Football League for Tranmere Rovers.
