= Stan Billington =

English footballer

Personal information
- Full name: Stanley Billington
- Date of birth: 23 February 1937
- Place of birth: Wallasey, England
- Date of death: 2011 (aged 73–74)
- Place of death: Wirral, England
- Position: Full back

Senior career*
Years	Team	Apps	(Gls)
1960–1964	Tranmere Rovers	93	(0)
- * Club domestic league appearances and goals

Stan Billington (1937 – 2011) was an English footballer, who played as a full back in the Football League for Tranmere Rovers.
