= Alan Blundell =

English footballer

Personal information
- Full name: Alan Blundell
- Date of birth: 18 August 1947 (age 79)
- Place of birth: Birkenhead, England
- Position: Wing half

Senior career*
Years	Team	Apps	(Gls)
1965–1967	Tranmere Rovers	3	(0)
1967–1968	Wigan Athletic	35	(5)
- * Club domestic league appearances and goals

Alan Blundell (born 18 August 1947) is an English footballer, who played as a wing half in the Football League for Tranmere Rovers. He also spent one season at Wigan Athletic, playing 35 games and scoring five goals in the Cheshire League.
