= Alan Holder =

English footballer (1931– 2013)

Personal information
- Date of birth: 10 December 1931
- Place of birth: Oxford, England
- Date of death: June 2013 (aged 81)
- Place of death: Oxfordshire, England
- Position: Wing half

Youth career
- 6th Battalion RAOC

Senior career*
Years	Team	Apps	(Gls)
1954–1955	Nottingham Forest	3	(0)
1955–1956	Lincoln City	1	(0)
1956–1957	Tranmere Rovers	13	(1)
- Headington United
Total		17	(1)
- * Club domestic league appearances and goals

Alan Holder (10 December 1931 – June 2013) was a footballer who played as a wing half in the Football League for Nottingham Forest, Lincoln City and Tranmere Rovers.
