= Roy Saunders =

English footballer

Personal information
- Date of birth: 4 September 1930
- Place of birth: Salford, England
- Date of death: 29 January 2009 (aged 78)
- Place of death: Swansea, Wales
- Position: Wing-half

Youth career
- Hull City

Senior career*
Years	Team	Apps	(Gls)
1948–1959	Liverpool	132	(1)
1959–1963	Swansea Town	94	(3)

International career
- England Youth
- * Club domestic league appearances and goals

Roy Saunders (4 September 1930 – 29 January 2009) was a professional footballer who played for Liverpool and Swansea Town. He was the father of footballer Dean Saunders.

== Life and playing career ==
Born in Salford, Lancashire, England, Saunders began his career as an amateur with Hull City before moving to Liverpool when manager George Kay signed him in May 1948. His debut, which did not come for almost five years, was against Gateshead in the third round of the FA Cup on 10 January 1953. The match was one to forget, as Liverpool were humbled 1–0 in one of the biggest upsets in the team's history.

Saunders's only goal came on 25 August 1956 in a 2–0 league win at Gigg Lane. It was the second goal as the Reds wrapped up both the points against Bury by the 17th minute.

Saunders struggled to get into the starting lineup, appearing 15 times in 1953 and 20 times during the following campaign. It was not until Liverpool's relegation in 1954 that Saunders became a regular, when he was selected 32 times. That was the first year of a three-year run where he held on to the left-half spot in the first team. In 1956, Saunders was chosen 42 times, which ended up being his best season at Anfield. He followed this up with 28 appearances.

Saunders lost his place again in 1957 and did not get a run in the side until a cup match against Southend United in January 1958. He started the next four matches but again was replaced. The 1958–59 season was even worse for Saunders, who was eventually allowed to leave just before the end of the season in March 1959. After just four outings, he joined South Wales club Swansea Town where he played almost 100 times. Before retiring, Saunders played for Welsh amateur club Ammanford Town.

Saunders's connection with Liverpool did not end when he left for the Swans; his son, Dean, was also a professional footballer who played up front for the Reds during the 1990s. Dean Saunders also played for Swansea, now City, and became a Welsh international.

== Career details ==
- Liverpool F.C (1948–1959) - 146 appearances, 1 goal
- England capped at youth level
