= Brian Johnson (footballer, born 1948) =

English footballer

Personal information
- Full name: Brian Joseph Johnson
- Date of birth: 29 October 1948 (age 77)
- Place of birth: Huyton, England
- Position: Midfielder

Senior career*
Years	Team	Apps	(Gls)
1968–1969	Tranmere Rovers	1	(0)
- * Club domestic league appearances and goals

Brian Joseph Johnson (born 29 October 1948) is an English footballer, who played as a midfielder in the Football League for Tranmere Rovers.
