= Eddie Roberts (footballer) =

English footballer

Personal information
- Full name: Edward John Roberts
- Date of birth: 16 November 1947 (age 78)
- Place of birth: Liverpool, England
- Position: Goalkeeper

Senior career*
Years	Team	Apps	(Gls)
1968–1970	Tranmere Rovers	7	(0)
1970–1971	Wigan Athletic	1	(0)
- * Club domestic league appearances and goals

Eddie Roberts (born 16 November 1947) is an English footballer, who played as a goalkeeper in the Football League for Tranmere Rovers. He also played for Wigan Athletic in the Northern Premier League.
