= Frank Prescott (footballer) =

English footballer

Personal information
- Full name: Francis Stephen Prescott
- Date of birth: 12 August 1922
- Place of birth: Birkenhead, England
- Date of death: 1969 (aged 46–47)
- Place of death: Birkenhead, England
- Position: Centre forward

Senior career*
Years	Team	Apps	(Gls)
1946–1947	Tranmere Rovers	2	(0)
- * Club domestic league appearances and goals

Frank Prescott (1922 – 1969) was an English footballer, who played as a centre forward in the Football League for Tranmere Rovers.
