= Hugh McAuley (footballer, born 1953) =

English footballer (born 1953)

Personal information
- Date of birth: 8 January 1953 (age 73)
- Place of birth: Bootle, Merseyside, England
- Position: Winger

Youth career
- Liverpool

Senior career*
Years	Team	Apps	(Gls)
1970–1974	Liverpool	0	(0)
1973–1974	→ Tranmere Rovers (loan)	13	(1)
1974–1976	Plymouth Argyle	77	(7)
1976–1978	Charlton Athletic	55	(9)
1978–1979	Tranmere Rovers	43	(0)
1979–1981	Carlisle United	17	(1)
- Formby
- * Club domestic league appearances and goals

Hugh McAuley (born 8 January 1953) is an English former professional footballer who played as a winger. He made 205 appearances in the Football League for Tranmere Rovers, Plymouth Argyle, Charlton Athletic and Carlisle United.

== Career ==
McAuley began his career at Liverpool, but made his senior debut on loan at Tranmere Rovers. He joined Plymouth Argyle for £12,000 in 1974 and won promotion to the Second Division in his first season with the club. He moved to Charlton Athletic in 1976, where he played for two seasons, and then returned to Tranmere. McAuley joined Carlisle United the following year and spent two seasons with the club, but did not play regularly. He finished his playing career in non-league football with Formby.

He returned to Liverpool in 1988 as a coach, having worked with the Merseyside Youth Association from 1982. He was responsible for the club's centre of excellence programme and was involved in the youth team that won the FA Youth Cup for the first time in 1996. He then worked in the club's new youth academy and managed the reserve team before leaving Liverpool in 2009. Robbie Fowler, Jamie Carragher, Michael Owen and Steven Gerrard were among those who came through the academy during McAuley's time at Liverpool. McAuley's son, Hugh, made 100 appearances in the Football League for Cheltenham Town.
