= Eric Anderson (English footballer) =

English footballer

Personal information
- Date of birth: 12 March 1931
- Date of death: July 1990 (aged 59)
- Position: Forward

Senior career*
Years	Team	Apps	(Gls)
1953–1957	Liverpool	73	(21)
1957–	Barnsley	9	(1)
- Bournemouth
- Macclesfield Town
- Hyde United
1961–1962	Mossley	1	(0)

Managerial career
- Ashton United Reserves
- * Club domestic league appearances and goals

Eric Anderson (12 March 1931 – July 1990) was an English footballer who played as a striker for Liverpool in The Football League.

== Career ==
Wilkinson signed for Liverpool when he was 20 years old. He made his debut in 1953 when he played against Charlton Athletic that was to be his only appearance of the 1952–53 season. Anderson scored five goals in thirteen games as Liverpool were relegated the following season. He became a regular start for the team while the club was in the Second Division, playing 32 games and scoring 10 goals. He continued to play regularly for the club until he was transferred to Barnsley in 1957.

Later spells with Bournemouth, Macclesfield Town and Hyde United followed before he signed for Mossley making just one appearance in the 1961–62 season. He later became manager of Ashton United Reserves.
