= Jack Bavin =

English footballer

Personal information
- Full name: John Bavin
- Date of birth: 25 May 1921
- Place of birth: South Ferriby, England
- Date of death: 11 March 2001 (aged 79)
- Place of death: Scunthorpe, England
- Position: Full back

Senior career*
Years	Team	Apps	(Gls)
- Ballymena United
1947–1948	Arbroath		
1948	Leith Athletic		
1948–1949	Tranmere Rovers	2	(0)
- * Club domestic league appearances and goals

Jack Bavin (25 May 1921 – 11 March 2001 ) was an English footballer, who played as a full back in the Football League for Tranmere Rovers.
