= Fred Tomley =

English footballer

Personal information
- Full name: Frederick William Tomley
- Date of birth: 11 July 1931
- Place of birth: Liverpool, England
- Date of death: 13 February 1981 (aged 49)
- Place of death: Liverpool, England
- Position: Defender

Senior career*
Years	Team	Apps	(Gls)
- Litherland
1953–1955	Liverpool	2	(0)
1955–1956	Chester	1	(0)
- Witton Albion
- * Club domestic league appearances and goals

Frederick William Tomley (11 July 1931 – 13 February 1981) was an English footballer who played as a defender in the Football League for Liverpool and Chester. He also played non-league football for Litherland and Witton Albion.
