= Dave Underwood =

English footballer & manager (1928–1989)

Personal information
- Full name: Edmund David Underwood
- Date of birth: 15 March 1928
- Place of birth: London, England
- Date of death: 25 January 1989 (aged 60)
- Place of death: Durban, South Africa
- Position: Goalkeeper

Youth career
- Kingsbury Town

Senior career*
Years	Team	Apps	(Gls)
- Edgware Town
1949–1952	QPR	2	
1952–1953	Watford	52	
1953–1956	Liverpool	45	(0)
1956–1957	Watford		
1957–1960	Dartford		
1960–1963	Watford		
1963–1965	Fulham	19	
1965–1966	Dunstable Town		
1966–1967	Hastings United		
1967–1968	Barnet		

Managerial career
- 1966–1967: Hastings United (player-manager)
- 1968-1969: Wealdstone
- * Club domestic league appearances and goals

Edmund David Underwood (15 March 1928 – 25 January 1989) was an English footballer. He played for several clubs as a goalkeeper, most notably in the Football League for QPR, Watford, Liverpool and Fulham. He later player served Hastings United as a player-manager, Wealdstone as manager, and Barnet as chairman.

During his time as Barnet chairman, he helped former England international Jimmy Greaves overcome his alcohol addiction. On 18 September 2025 He was named as the 496th player to play for Queens Park Rangers with his debut on 26 January 1952.
