= Frank Lock =

English footballer and manager

Personal information
- Date of birth: 12 March 1922
- Place of birth: Whitechapel, London, England
- Date of death: 17 March 1985 (aged 63)
- Place of death: Colchester, England
- Position: Left back

Senior career*
Years	Team	Apps	(Gls)
1945–1946	Finchley		
1946–1954	Charlton Athletic	222	(8)
1954–1955	Liverpool	41	(0)
1955–1957	Watford	42	(1)
1957–1958	Cambridge United		
Total		305	(9)
- * Club domestic league appearances and goals

Frank William Lock (12 March 1922 – 17 March 1985) was an English footballer and manager who played as a left back in the Football League.

== Personal life ==
Frank's parents, Mary Ann and Frank William, had 5 children, Dorothy (Doll), Frank, Fred, Richard (George) and Charlie. Most lived in North London – formally known as Middlesex, particularly the Barnet area. His relations are spread across the country including London, Surrey and Cornwall as only currently known. he also had 2 sons Peter and David.
