= Eddie Robertson =

Scottish footballer

Personal information
- Full name: Edward Harold Yeoman Robertson
- Date of birth: 19 December 1935
- Place of birth: Edinburgh, Scotland
- Date of death: 17 December 1981 (aged 45)
- Place of death: West Kirby
- Position: Full back

Youth career
- Linlithgow Rose

Senior career*
Years	Team	Apps	(Gls)
1956–63	Bury	196	(5)
1963–64	Wrexham	24	(0)
1964–69	Tranmere Rovers	147	(1)
1969–	Ellesmere Port		
Total		367	(6)
- * Club domestic league appearances and goals

Edward Harold Yeoman "Eddie" Robertson (also known as "Dagger") (19 December 1935 – December 1981) was a Scottish footballer who played for Bury, Wrexham and Tranmere Rovers, before moving to Ellesmere Port as player/coach. He returned to Tranmere as assistant manager and coach under John King until his death, aged 45
