= Don Campbell (footballer) =

English footballer

Personal information
- Full name: Donald Campbell
- Date of birth: 19 October 1932
- Place of birth: Bootle, England
- Date of death: September 2016 (aged 83)
- Place of death: Kent, England
- Position: Full back

Youth career
- 1950–1953: Liverpool

Senior career*
Years	Team	Apps	(Gls)
1953–1958	Liverpool	47	(2)
1958–1962	Crewe Alexandra	149	(1)
1962–1964	Gillingham	29	(0)
1964–1967	Folkestone Town	?	(?)
–	Margate	?	(?)
–	Canterbury City	?	(?)
Total		225	(3)
- * Club domestic league appearances and goals

Donald Campbell (19 October 1932 – September 2016) was an English professional footballer who played as a full back. He was born in Bootle and made over 200 appearances in the Football League between 1953 and 1964.

== Career ==
Campbell played in the Football League for Liverpool, Crewe Alexandra and Gillingham, scoring three goals in 225 appearances. He later played non-league football for Folkestone Town (1964–1967), Margate (99 appearances in all competitions), and Canterbury City.
