= Neil Horwood =

Scottish footballer

Personal information
- Date of birth: 4 August 1964 (age 62)
- Place of birth: Peterhead, Scotland
- Height: 6 ft 2 in (1.88 m)
- Position: Forward

Youth career
- King's Lynn

Senior career*
Years	Team	Apps	(Gls)
1986–1987	Grimsby Town	1	(0)
1987	→ Halifax Town (loan)	3	(0)
1987	→ Tranmere Rovers (loan)	4	(1)
1987–1988	Cambridge United	14	(2)
1987–1988	Barnet	1	(0)
- Spalding United
Total		23	(3)
- * Club domestic league appearances and goals

Neil Horwood (born 4 August 1964) is a footballer who played as a forward in the Football League for Cambridge United.
