= Gerry Tansey =

English footballer (1933–2019)

Personal information
- Full name: Gerard Tansey
- Date of birth: 15 October 1933
- Place of birth: Liverpool, England
- Date of death: May 2019 (aged 85)
- Place of death: Sefton, Merseyside, England
- Position: Winger

Senior career*
Years	Team	Apps	(Gls)
1955–1956	Tranmere Rovers	3	(1)
- * Club domestic league appearances and goals

Gerard Tansey (15 October 1933 – May 2019) was an English footballer who played as a winger in the English Football League for Tranmere Rovers. He died in Sefton, Merseyside in May 2019, at the age of 85.
