= Alex Alexander (footballer) =

Scottish footballer (1924–2005)

Personal information
- Date of birth: 28 September 1924
- Place of birth: Glasgow, Scotland
- Date of death: 14 May 2005 (aged 80)
- Place of death: Bath, England
- Position: Outside left

Senior career*
Years	Team	Apps	(Gls)
–1946	New Brighton		
1946–1949	Tranmere Rovers	23	(3)
Total		23	(3)
- * Club domestic league appearances and goals

Alex Alexander (28 September 1924 – 14 May 2005) was a Scottish footballer, who played as an outside left for New Brighton and Tranmere Rovers.
