= Frank Gill (footballer, born 1948) =

English footballer (born 1948)

Personal information
- Full name: Frank Gill
- Date of birth: 5 December 1948 (age 77)
- Place of birth: Manchester, England
- Position: Winger

Senior career*
Years	Team	Apps	(Gls)
1965–1968	Manchester United	0	(0)
1968–1971	Tranmere Rovers	74	(8)
1971–?	Altrincham		
- * Club domestic league appearances and goals

Frank Gill (born 5 December 1948) is an English footballer, who played as a winger in the Football League for Tranmere Rovers.

Gill started his career as an apprentice with Manchester United, before joining Tranmere Rovers in 1968. He went on to play for Altrincham.
