= Tom Byrom =

English footballer

Personal information
- Full name: Tom Byrom
- Date of birth: 17 March 1920
- Place of birth: Upton, England
- Date of death: November 1997 (aged 77)
- Place of death: Blackpool, England
- Position: Wing half

Senior career*
Years	Team	Apps	(Gls)
1946–1947	Tranmere Rovers	3	(0)
- * Club domestic league appearances and goals

Tom Byrom (17 March 1920 – November 1997) was an English footballer, who played as a wing half in the Football League for Tranmere Rovers.
