= Barry Wilkinson =

English footballer (1935–2004)

Personal information
- Full name: George Barry Wilkinson
- Date of birth: 16 June 1935
- Place of birth: Bishop Auckland, England
- Date of death: May 2004 (aged 68)
- Place of death: Liverpool, England
- Position: Midfielder

Senior career*
Years	Team	Apps	(Gls)
1954–1960	Liverpool	78	(0)
1960–1963	Bangor City		
1963–1964	Tranmere Rovers	3	(0)
Total		81	(0)
- * Club domestic league appearances and goals

George Barry Wilkinson (16 June 1935 – May 2004) was an English footballer who played as a wing half for Liverpool and Tranmere Rovers in the Football League. Wilkinson signed for Liverpool from amateur team Bishop Auckland, with whom he won the FA Amateur Cup. He made appearances for the club during the 1953–54 season and was mainly used as a half-back. He remained with the club for several seasons but was unable to claim a regular starting place in the side. At the end of the 1959–60 season, during which Bill Shankly took charge of Liverpool, Wilkinson was transferred to Bangor City. He later played for Tranmere Rovers.

Wilkinson was born in Bishop Auckland in 1935 and died in Liverpool in 2004 at the age of 68.
