= Tony Rowley =

Welsh footballer (1929–2006)

Personal information
- Full name: Antonio Camillo Rowley
- Date of birth: 19 September 1929
- Place of birth: Porthcawl, Wales
- Date of death: 28 April 2006 (aged 76)
- Place of death: Bromborough, England
- Position: Centre forward

Senior career*
Years	Team	Apps	(Gls)
19??–1951	Wellington Town		
1949–1951	Birmingham City	0	(0)
1951–1953	Stourbridge		
1953–1958	Liverpool	60	(38)
1958–1961	Tranmere Rovers	100	(45)
1961–1962	Bangor City		
1962–1963	Northwich Victoria		
1963–1964	Mossley		

International career
1959	Wales	1	(0)
- * Club domestic league appearances and goals

Antonio Camillo Rowley (19 September 1929 – 28 April 2006) was a Welsh footballer who played in the English Football League for Liverpool and Tranmere Rovers. A centre forward, he also played for Wellington Town, Birmingham City, Stourbridge, Bangor City, Northwich Victoria and Mossley. He was capped once for Wales.
