= List of Tranmere Rovers F.C. players (1921–1939) =

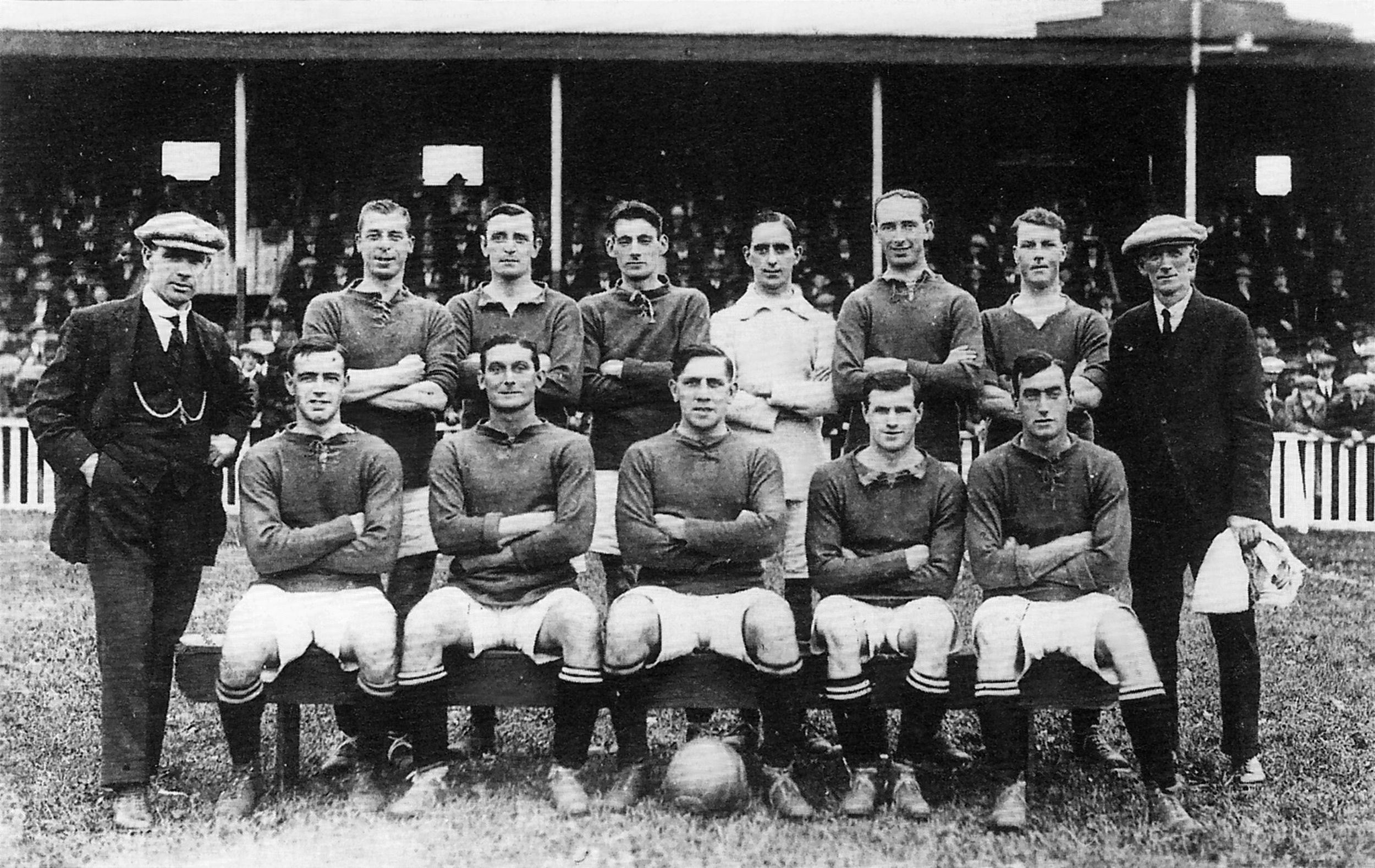
Tranmere in 1921, including Johnny Campbell, Jimmy Moreton and Tommy Stuart

Tranmere Rovers Football Club is an English association football club based in Birkenhead, Wirral. Founded in 1884, they played their first games under the name Belmont F.C.; in 1885, before the start of their second season, they adopted the name Tranmere Rovers. In 1889, Tranmere entered the West Lancashire League, and progressed through the Combination, the Lancashire Combination and the Central League. On 27 August 1921, as founder members of Division Three North, they won their first Football League match 4–1 against Crewe Alexandra at Prenton Park. Tranmere have played in the Football League ever since, with the exception of 1939–1946, when competitive football was suspended due to the Second World War. Their highest league finish was fourth in the First Division which, at the time, was the second tier of the league pyramid, in the 1992–93 season.

== Players ==
This list contains players who appeared in nationally organised first-team competition for Tranmere from 1921 until the Second World War. It includes first-team appearances and goals in the Football League, the FA Cup and the Third Division North Cup. Appearances and goals in other competitions or non-competitive matches are not included. Statistics from the three games in the 1939–40 Football League season abandoned because of the Second World War have been expunged from the records and are not included. Players that also represented the club after the war are instead at List of post-war Tranmere Rovers F.C. players.

Jimmy Moreton joined in 1910, and went on to manage the team.

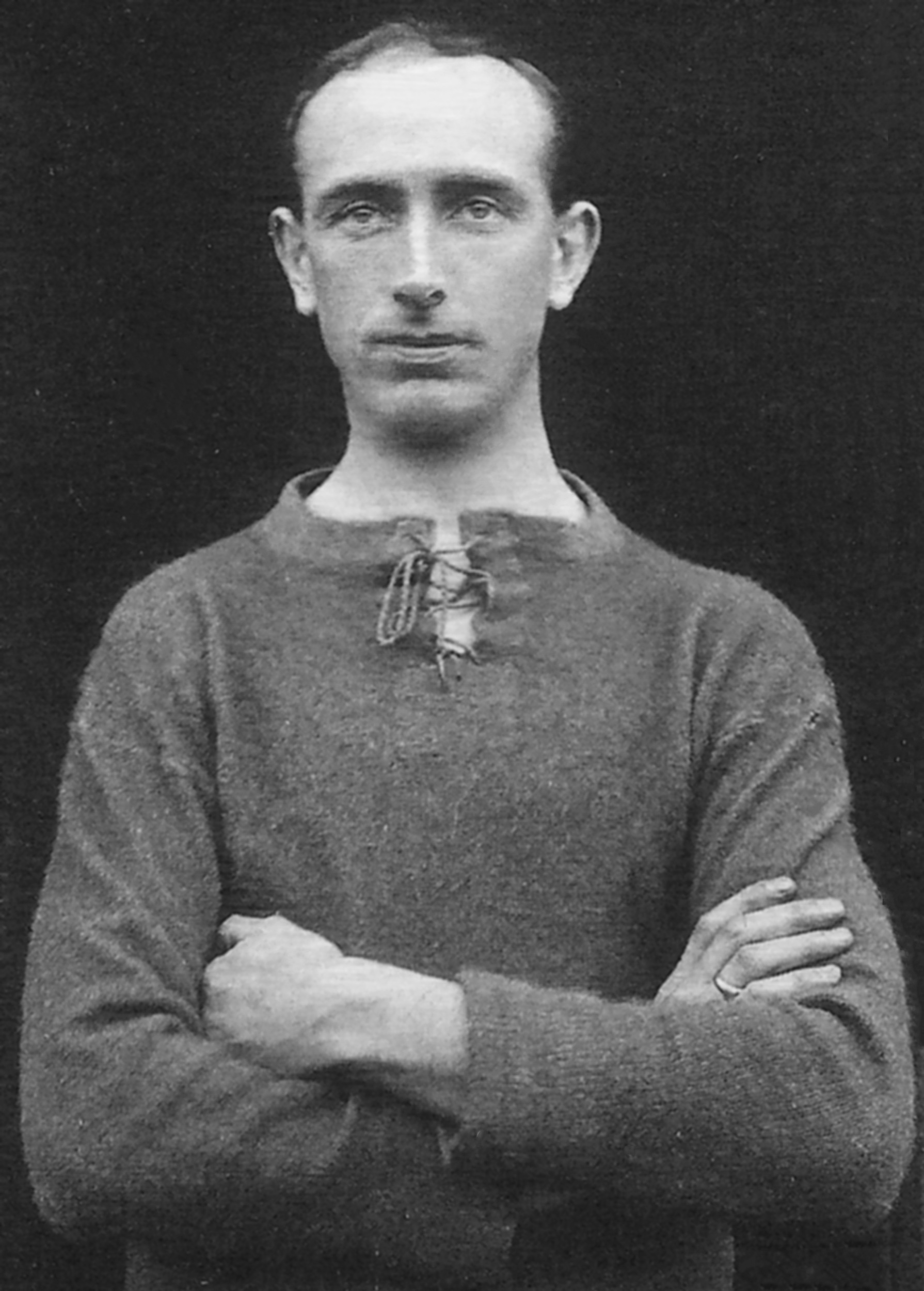
Tommy Stuart was Rovers' regular left back between 1921 and 1927.

List of pre-war players
Name	Position (Note: Positions are listed according to the tactical formation that were employed until the 1960s.)	Years	Appearances (Note: All statistics sourced from Upton; Wilson; Bishop (2009) which does not include FA Cup appearances prior to 1921.)	GK oals?	International (Note: If a player received an international first-team cap, the country or countries he represented are shown.)
Edward Adams	FW	1929–1933	7	1	–
Edward Alcock	FW	1935–1936	5	1	–
John Almond	FW	1936–1937	23	5	–
Charlie Amery	FB	1935–1938	49	0	–
Horace Baker	FW	1934–1936	25	12	–
Edmund Baldwin	FW	1921–1922	1	0	–
Jack Bamber	HB	1927–1930	89	2	England
Teddy Barton	HB	1925–1935	257	5	–
Fred Bedford	FW	1927–1928	3	2	–
Bunny Bell	FW	1930–1936	127	113	–
Sammy Beswick	FW	1922–1929	73	33	–
Harry Bevan	FW	1927–1928	3	2	–
Danny Birtles	FW	1924–1925	11	0	–
William Bowen	FW	1929–1930	3	0	–
George Bradshaw	FB	1935–1936	5	0	–
Harry Bradshaw	GK	1921–1923	61	0	–
Arthur Briggs	GK	1924–1932	246	0	–
Jack Brown	FW	1923–1925	51	13	Ireland
Samuel Brown	FW	1933–1935	13	2	–
Tom Buchan	HB	1923–1924	39	0	–
Ted Buckley	FW	1937–1939	38	14	–
Denis Bullough	FW	1921–1922	11	7	–
Meynell Burgin	FW	1934–1935	32	23	–
Wilf Burrows	GK	1926–1931	49	0	–
Charles Butler	FW	1936–1937	1	0	–
Johnny Campbell	HB	1914–1929	204	11	–
Joseph Carter	FW	1936–1937	6	1	–
Arthur Carvell	FB	1932–1933	11	0	–
James Cassidy	FW	1937–1939	55	10	–
Billy Chalmers	FW	1925–1926	25	4	–
Billy Charlton	FW	1925–1930	137	74	–
Frank Checkland	HB	1923–1925	18	0	–
Ted Chiverton	HB	1932–1935	7	0	–
Archie Clark	HB	1935–1939	108	1	–
Bill Conner	FB	1930–1931	2	0	–
Fred Cook	FW	1921–1923	21	2	–
George Cook	FB	1931–1932	21	2	–
Billy Crewe	HB	1924–1925	21	0	–
Arthur Crompton	HB	1935–1936	14	4	–
Reg Cropper	FW	1929–1930	18	4	–
George Crowther	FW	1922–1923	10	2	–
Vic Crutchley	FB	1930–1931	1	0	–
Charlie Cunningham	FW	1921–1922	34	6	–
Jack Curnow	GK	1937–1939	59	0	–
Charlie Curtis	HB	1935–1936	28	0	–
Dickie Dale	HB	1931–1932	10	0	–
Ernie Davies	HB	1936–1938	48	1	–
Samuel Davis	FB	1925–1926	5	0	–
Thomas Davis	FW	1937–1938	11	7	(Republic of Ireland) Ireland (FAI); Ireland (IFA) (Note: Between 1926 and 1950, two competing teams represented the island of Ireland – the FAI and the IFA. Davis was a dual international who played for both teams.)
Frank Dawson	FB	1933–1936	83	0	–
Alf Day	HB	1938–1939	33	0	–
Dixie Dean	FW	1923–1925	33	27	–
Ronnie Dellow	FW	1935–1939	110	31	–
Ernie Dixon	FW	1930–1933	92	59	–
Stanley Docking	FW	1938–1939	31	7	–
Ernie Dodd	FB	1933–1937	16	0	–
Stan Duff	FW	1937–1938	10	3	–
Billy Eden	FW	1934–1939	146	31	–
William Edwards	HB	1936–1937	1	0	–
Herbie Evans	HB	1926–1928	46	0	–
Jabez Evans	FW	1922–1925	48	5	–
Peter Fairclough	HB	1921–1922	8	0	–
Dick Fairhurst	FB	1935–1937	37	0	–
Bert Fishwick	FW	1930–1934	93	9	–
Jack Flanagan	FW	1926–1929	67	43	–
George Flowers	HB	1937–1939	45	1	–
Billy Fogg	FW	1924–1926	22	6	–
John Ford	FW	1921–1922	15	4	–
Allen Forshaw	FB	1921–1922	1	0	–
Arthur Forshaw	FW	1932–1933	1	0	–
William Foster	FW	1936–1937	1	0	–
Nathan Fraser	FW	1938–1939	1	0	–
Winston Frost	GK	1936–1937	1	0	–
David Fulton	FW	1921–1922	8	3	–
Francis Gill	GK	1922–1923	18	0	–
William Glasper	HB	1933–1935	21	4	–
John Grainger	FB	1921–1922	1	0	–
Albert Gray	GK	1931–1936	213	0	Wales
Robert Gray	HB	1927–1929	4	1	–
Joe Griffiths	FW	1924–1925	8	0	–
John Griffiths	FW	1936–1939	18	1	–
Fred Groves	FW	1921–1922	12	7	–
Alf Hagan	FW	1926–1927	12	0	–
Fred Halstead	HB	1922–1925	89	2	–
Herbert Hamilton	FB	1937–1939	54	1	–
Andrew Hawarden	HB	1922–1924	21	0	–
Charlie Hayes	FB	1921–1924	26	0	–
Fred Hayes	FW	1922–1924	11	1	–
John Hayes	FW	1922–1924	3	0	–
Ernie Henshaw	FW	1931–1932	1	0	–
Tom Heslop	HB	1921–1922	8	0	–
Bert Heywood	FW	1934–1935	9	1	–
Reginald Hill	HB	1932–1933	1	0	–
Harold Hilton	FW	1921–1924	53	5	–
Samuel Hopkinson	HB	1935–1936	11	0	–
Thomas Hughes	FW	1921–1922	3	0	–
Robert Hunt	FW	1933–1934	10	2	–
James Hyam	FW	1921–1922	1	0	–
Archie Jackson	HB	1928–1930	41	0	–
Bob Jackson	FW	1924–1925	6	1	–
George Jackson	FB	1923–1930	114	0	–
William Jackson	FB	1936–1937	7	0	–
Bert Jeffes	HB	1924–1925	16	0	–
John Johnson	HB	1925–1926	2	0	–
Gwyn Jones	FB	1938–1939	17	0	–
Ossie Jones	FW	1936–1938	59	13	–
Robert Jones	FB	1932–1933	2	0	–
Tommy Jones	FW	1926–1929	92	28	–
Sidney Kearney	FW	1937–1939	9	2	–
Jack Kearns	FB	1938–1939	22	1	–
Charles Kelly	FW	1927–1928	1	0	–
Andy Kennedy	FB	1930–1931	38	0	–
Jack Kennedy	FW	1930–1932	67	45	–
John Kimberley	FW	1922–1923	2	0	–
Herbert King (footballer)	FW	1937–1938	16	5	–
Harry Kitching	FW	1931–1932	5	0	–
Rex Leary	HB	1922–1924	5	0	–
Alex Leslie	HB	1925–1926	14	0	–
George Lewins	FB	1930–1932	34	0	–
Cyril Lewis	FW	1932–1933	8	0	–
Ginger Lewis	HB	1925–1934	288	10	Wales
Joseph Lewis	FB	1923–1925	11	0	–
Norman Lewis	GK	1936–1939	61	0	–
Harry Littlehales	FW	1923–1932	173	52	–
Duggie Livingstone	FB	1930–1933	95	0	–
Evan Lloyd	FW	1921–1922	11	0	–
John Lomax	FW	1922–1923	5	2	–
Willy MacDonald	FW	1934–1935	89	20	–
William Mackay	FW	1933–1934	7	1	–
Emlyn Maddocks	FW	1936–1937	2	0	–
Cyril Maher	FW	1936–1937	1	0	–
Bill Major	HB	1934–1937	10	0	–
Fred Marquis	FW	1925–1927	74	33	–
Vince Matthews	HB	1925–1927	88	3	–
John Mayson	FW	1937–1938	9	2	–
Joe McGrae	HB	1925–1926	8	0	–
Hugh McLaren	HB	1935–1937	49	4	–
Tom McMurray	FW	1932–1933	29	4	–
Bob Meacock	HB	1933–1935	62	4	–
Joe Mercer	HB	1921–1922	18	1	–
Sammy Meston	FW	1929–1932	115	31	–
Alforth Miller	FW	1935–1937	30	1	–
William Miller	FW	1938–1939	12	1	–
Charles Milnes	HB	1921–1922	16	2	–
Frank Mitchell	GK	1923–1925	63	0	–
Patrick Moore	HB	1930–1931	4	0	–
George Moorhouse	HB	1921–1922	2	0	United States
Jimmy Moreton	FW	1910–1926	159	12	–
Bill Murphy	FW	1930–1931	3	0	–
Tommy Naylor	FB	1924–1931	85	2	–
Percy Newton	HB	1934–1936	64	0	–
James Niven	FB	1921–1922	17	0	–
John O'Connor	FW	1927–1928	2	0	–
Alf Obrey	HB	1938–1939	17	0	–
Arthur Owen	FB	1936–1939	11	0	–
Billy Owen	FW	1935–1936	6	4	–
Tich Pearson	MF	1932–1934	33	1	–
James Pennington	FW	1933–1934	2	1	–
Frank Perfect	FB	1937–1939	16	0	–
Ernest Phillips	HB	1922–1923	19	1	–
Dick Platt	FB	1932–1937	189	0	–
Thomas Poskett	GK	1935–1937	24	0	–
John Prentice	FW	1921–1922	25	5	–
Norman Proctor	FW	1925–1927	59	14	–
Billy Rainford	FW	1921–1923	22	6	–
Archie Ratcliffe	FW	1922–1923	2	0	–
Percy Richards	FW	1928–1929	5	1	–
Bill Ridding	FW	1928–1930, 1935–1936	20	13	–
John Ridgway	FB	1928–1929	2	0	–
Ellis Rimmer	FW	1924–1928	66	22	–
Billy Roberts	FW	1925–1926	6	1	–
Gerald Roberts	FB	1932–1933	2	0	–
James Roberts	FW	1921–1922	34	1	–
William Robertson	FW	1936–1937	1	0	–
Alfred Robinson	FW	1921–1922	4	0	–
James Robinson	FW	1922–1924	8	1	–
William Roper	GK	1932–1935	3	0	–
Peter Rothwell	FW	1923–1925	9	0	–
Reginald Rowles	FB	1931–1932	2	0	–
Jack Roy	FW	1938–1939	21	2	–
Edward Rutter	HB	1924–1925	15	0	–
Stan Sayer	FW	1922–1925	87	33	–
George Sewell	HB	1922–1923	35	0	–
Bernard Sharkey	FW	1922–1923	23	3	–
Alex Sharp	HB	1930–1931	3	0	–
Bert Shears	HB	1930–1931	29	0	–
Harold Sherlock	GK	1936–1937	1	0	–
George Smith	FW	1924–1926	37	0	–
Reg Smith	FW	1938–1939	1	0	–
William Smith	FW	1938–1939	1	0	–
James Spence	FB	1930–1931	2	0	–
Reg Spencer	HB	1931–1939	256	3	–
Teddy Spencer	FW	1932–1934	17	4	–
Tom Stott	FW	1921–1922	1	0	–
Tom Stuart	FB	1921–1928	205	13	–
Arthur Sugden	FB	1921–1923	4	0	–
Ernest Temple	GK	1932–1933, 1936–1937	2	0	–
Percy Thirkell	FB	1925–1930	184	0	–
Robert Thomas	FW	1938–1939	9	1	–
William Thomas	HB	1933–1934	7	0	–
Bob Thompson	FB	1922–1923	36	5	–
Robert Thompson	FW	1926–1927	1	0	–
Robert Tong	FW	1932–1934	7	1	–
Harry Travis	FW	1938–1939	14	3	–
Charles Tucker	GK	1936–1937	1	0	–
Fred Urmson	FW	1927–1936	333	107	–
Edgar Walkden	HB	1937–1939	22	0	–
Pongo Waring	FW	1927–1928, 1936–1939	105	67	England
Emerys Warren	FB	1933–1935	9	0	–
Gillie Wassell	FB	1937–1939	65	2	–
Archie Waterston	FW	1929–1930	32	19	–
Jack Watson	HB	1933–1936	5	1	–
Farewell Watts	FW	1929–1934	128	60	–
Bob White	FW	1925–1927	47	16	–
Bert Whitehurst	FW	1931–1934	90	35	–
Crawford Whyte	FB	1936–1937	12	0	–
Leslie Wilde	GK	1923–1924	1	0	–
Edward Winn	HB	1921–1922	1	0	–
Albert Wood	FW	1936–1937	39	11	–
Billy Woodward	FW	1933–1936	110	44	–
Wilf Yates	FB	1926–1929	97	0	–
