= 1921–22 Halifax Town A.F.C. season =

Halifax Town
1921–22 season
- Manager: Joe McClelland
- Stadium: The Shay
- League Division 3 North: 18th
- FA Cup: N/A
- Top goalscorer: League: Jack Woods; All: Jack Woods

The 1921–22 season saw Halifax Town compete in League Division 3 North, where they finished in 18th position.

== Statistics ==
=== Appearances and goals ===
No.	Pos	Nat	Player	Total		Division 3N	
No.	Pos	Nat	Player	Apps	Goals	Apps	Goals
	MF	(Scotland) SCO	David Anderson	10	2	10	2
	GK	(England) ENG	Harry Baker	20	0	20	0
	DF	(England) ENG	Tom Bertwhistle	2	0	2	0
	MF	(England) ENG	George Broskhom	1	0	1	0
	MF	(England) ENG	Samuel Challinor	23	2	23	2
	MF	(Northern Ireland) NIR	Sydney Cobain	1	0	1	0
	GK	(England) ENG	James Cruise	1	0	1	0
	FW	(England) ENG	Fred Dent	25	9	25	9
	DF		Stephen Fitzsimmons	1	0	1	0
	GK	(Scotland) SCO	Jim Haldane	8	0	8	0
	MF	(England) ENG	Fretwell Hall	34	0	34	0
	DF	(England) ENG	Willie Hawley	7	0	7	0
	FW	(England) ENG	Syd Hetherington	27	11	27	11
	MF	(England) ENG	Horace Howson	16	0	16	0
	DF	(England) ENG	Bert Humpish	8	1	8	1
	FW	(Scotland) SCO	Jock Jamieson	16	4	16	4
	FW	(England) ENG	Andy Lincoln	1	0	1	0
	DF	(England) ENG	Harry Linley	22	1	22	1
	DF	(England) ENG	Percy Mackrill	28	0	28	0
	DF	(England) ENG	George Parkin	2	0	2	0
	FW	(England) ENG	Cecil Phipps	5	0	5	0
	FW	(England) ENG	Ernie Pinkney	30	2	30	2
	DF	(England) ENG	Jack Scull	8	0	8	0
	MF	(England) ENG	Ernie Smith	4	1	4	1
	GK	(England) ENG	Bob Suter	2	0	2	0
	GK	(England) ENG	Abe Waddington	7	0	7	0
	DF	(Scotland) SCO	Sandy Watson	8	0	8	0
	FW	(England) ENG	Maurice Wellock	32	3	32	3
	MF	(England) ENG	Johnny Whalley	34	6	34	6
	MF	(England) ENG	George Wild	13	2	13	2
	FW	(England) ENG	Jack Woods	21	12	21	12
	MF	(Wales) WAL	George Wynn	1	0	1	0

== Competitions ==
=== League Division 3 North ===
27 August 1921 1	Darlington	2–0	Halifax Town	Darlington
	Hooper 1'; Dickson 84' (pen.)	Report		Stadium: Feethams; Attendance: 8,532; Referee: I. Josephs

3 September 1921 2	Halifax Town	5–1	Darlington	Halifax
	Woods 15', 89'; Dent 19', 44'; Hetherington 70'	Report	Edmunds 80'	Stadium: The Shay; Attendance: 10,000; Referee: I. Josephs

10 September 1921 3	Rochdale	3–3	Halifax Town	Rochdale
	Hill; Dennison; Carney (pen.)	Report	Woods; Hetherington	Stadium: Spotland Stadium; Attendance: 8,000; Referee: J.O. Forshaw

17 September 1921 4	Halifax Town	1–1	Rochdale	Halifax
	Challinor 84'	Report	Collinge 65'	Stadium: The Shay; Attendance: 10,574; Referee: J.O. Forshaw

24 September 1921 5	Tranmere Rovers	2–2	Halifax Town	Birkenhead
	Prentice 20'; Bullough 30'	Report	Woods	Stadium: Prenton Park; Attendance: 7,000; Referee: J. Davies

1 October 1921 6	Halifax Town	0–2	Tranmere Rovers	Halifax
		Report	Bullough 25'; Groves 44'	Stadium: The Shay; Attendance: 8,000; Referee: J. Davies

8 October 1921 7	Halifax Town	2–3	Stalybridge Celtic	Halifax
	Dent 25'; Wellock 55'	Report	Petrie 28', 40'; Carney 50' (pen.)	Stadium: The Shay; Attendance: 8,358; Referee: J.G. Hickling

15 October 1921 8	Stalybridge Celtic	2–1	Halifax Town	Stalybridge
	Geddes 34'; Petrie 70'	Report	Woods 88'	Stadium: Bower Fold; Attendance: 7,000; Referee: J.G. Hickling

22 October 1921 9	Wigan Borough	4–3	Halifax Town	Wigan
	Freeman; Carlisle; Chesser	Report	Dent; Wild	Stadium: Springfield Park; Attendance: 2,500; Referee: S. Rothwell

29 October 1921 10	Halifax Town	1–2	Wigan Borough	Halifax
	Woods	Report	Freeman	Stadium: The Shay; Attendance: 9,000; Referee: S. Rothwell

5 November 1921 11	Halifax Town	3–0	Hartlepools United	Halifax
	Dent; Hetherington	Report		Stadium: The Shay; Attendance: 9,000; Referee: H.W. Andrews

12 November 1921 12	Hartlepools United	4–0	Halifax Town	Hartlepool
	Robertson; Scorgie; Parkinson; Lee	Report		Stadium: Victoria Park; Attendance: 7,000; Referee: G.H. Thrower

19 November 1921 13	Southport	3–0	Halifax Town	Southport
	Glover; Rigsby	Report		Stadium: Haig Avenue; Attendance: 6,000; Referee: J.T. Howcroft

26 November 1921 14	Halifax Town	1–1	Southport	Halifax
	Whalley	Report	Sinclair	Stadium: The Shay; Attendance: 3,000; Referee: J.T. Howcroft

10 December 1921 15	Halifax Town	2–1	Accrington Stanley	Halifax
	Challinor; Anderson	Report	Green	Stadium: The Shay; Attendance: 4,000; Referee: F. Cheetham

17 December 1921 16	Crewe Alexandra	2–1	Halifax Town	Crewe
	Houston; Caulfield	Report	Jamieson	Stadium: Gresty Road; Attendance: 6,000; Referee: J. Cahill

24 December 1921 17	Grimsby Town	4–1	Halifax Town	Cleethorpes
	Carmichael (pen.)	Report	Hetherington	Stadium: Blundell Park; Attendance: 8,000; Referee: W.F. Bunnell

26 December 1921 18	Stockport County	0–0	Halifax Town	Stockport
		Report	Challinor (red card)	Stadium: Edgeley Park; Attendance: 12,000; Referee: A. Ward

27 December 1921 19	Halifax Town	1–0	Stockport County	Halifax
	Woods 83'	Report		Stadium: The Shay; Attendance: 8,000; Referee: A. Ward

31 December 1921 20	Halifax Town	1–3	Walsall	Halifax
	Anderson	Report	Butler; Bowyer; Christie	Stadium: The Shay; Attendance: 8,000; Referee: J. Stewart

14 January 1922 21	Walsall	4–1	Halifax Town	Walsall
	Reid; Groves	Report	Hetherington	Stadium: Hilary Street; Referee: J. Stewart

16 January 1922 22	Halifax Town	2–0	Grimsby Town	Halifax
	Hetherington	Report		Stadium: The Shay; Attendance: 2,000

21 January 1922 23	Lincoln City	3–1	Halifax Town	Lincoln
	Rippon 13'; Chambers 32'; Lees 36'	Report	Jamieson 85'	Stadium: Sincil Bank; Attendance: F.J. Procter; Referee: 4,000

4 February 1922 24	Ashington	3–1	Halifax Town	Ashington
	Galloway; Featherstone (pen.); Dargue	Report	Humpish	Stadium: Portland Park; Referee: T. Tomlinson

11 February 1922 25	Halifax Town	2–0	Ashington	Halifax
	Pinkney 15', 46'	Report		Stadium: The Shay; Attendance: 6,000; Referee: T. Tomlinson

16 February 1922 26	Halifax Town	1–2	Lincoln City	Halifax
	Hetherington	Report	Fenwick; Chambers	Stadium: The Shay; Attendance: 5,000; Referee: T.G. Bryan

18 February 1922 27	Barrow	1–1	Halifax Town	Barrow-in-Furness
	Eaves	Report	Hetherington (pen.)	Stadium: Holker Street; Attendance: 5,000; Referee: G.H. Thrower

25 February 1922 28	Halifax Town	3–2	Barrow	Halifax
	Whalley; Smith; Hetherington	Report	Sharkey; Munro	Stadium: The Shay; Attendance: 8,000; Referee: G.H. Thrower

4 March 1922 29	Durham City	3–1	Halifax Town	Durham
	Wilson	Report	Wellock (pen.)	Stadium: Kepier Haughs; Attendance: 2,000; Referee: F. Slater

11 March 1922 30	Halifax Town	3–2	Durham City	Halifax
	Woods; Linley	Report	Wilson; Wensley	Stadium: The Shay; Attendance: 8,000; Referee: F. Slater

18 March 1922 31	Wrexham	5–1	Halifax Town	Wrexham
	Jones 23', 49'; Northam 70', 85'; Lloyd 75'	Report	Woods 42'	Stadium: Racecourse Ground; Attendance: 4,000; Referee: A.H. Kingscott

25 March 1922 32	Halifax Town	0–0	Wrexham	Halifax
		Report		Stadium: The Shay; Attendance: 4,000; Referee: A.H. Kingscott

1 April 1922 33	Nelson	0–0	Halifax Town	Nelson
		Report		Stadium: Seedhill; Attendance: 7,000; Referee: G.N. Watson

8 April 1922 34	Halifax Town	3–1	Nelson	Halifax
	Jamieson; Dent	Report	Wootton	Stadium: The Shay; Referee: G.N. Watson

15 April 1922 35	Halifax Town	1–2	Chesterfield	Halifax
	Wellock	Report	Williams	Stadium: The Shay; Attendance: 8,000; Referee: E. Farrar

17 April 1922 36	Accrington Stanley	1–2	Halifax Town	Accrington
	Hosker	Report	Whalley; Wild	Stadium: Peel Park; Attendance: 6,000; Referee: F. Cheetham

22 April 1922 37	Chesterfield	2–0	Halifax Town	Chesterfield
	Williams 50' (pen.); Leddy 73'	Report	Wellock (red card)	Stadium: Saltergate; Attendance: 4,000; Referee: E. Farrar

29 April 1922 38	Halifax Town	5–5	Crewe Alexandra	Halifax
	Dent; Whalley	Report	Rowlands; Winterburn; Caulfield	Stadium: The Shay; Attendance: 9,000; Referee: J.O. Forshaw
