= Amery =

Amery may refer to:

== People ==
- Amery of Pavy (died 1352), English knight, originally from Pavia in Lombardy, Italy
- Bill Amery (1894–1966), Australian rules footballer
- Charlie Amery (1910–1979), British footballer
- Jean Améry (1912–1978), Austrian author
- John Amery (1912–1945), British fascist, executed for treason
- Julian Amery, Baron Amery of Lustleigh, British Conservative politician
- Leo Amery (1873–1955), British Conservative politician, Secretary of State for India, father of John and Julian
- Les Amery (1934–1999), former Australian rules footballer
- Mickey Amery (born 1982), Canadian politician
- Moe Amery (1954–2023), former member of the Legislative Assembly of Alberta
- Rob Amery (born 1954), Australian linguist
- Richard Sanderson Amery, Australian former politician
- Shenda Amery, painter and sculptor
- William Bankes Amery (1883–26 November 1951), British painter and sculptor

== Places ==
- Amery, Western Australia, a rail siding
- Amery, Wisconsin, a city in Polk County
  - Amery Municipal Airport
- Amery Ice Shelf, Antarctica (named after William Bankes Amery)
- Amery Peaks, Antarctica

== See also ==
- Amery High School, a school in Amery, Wisconsin, U.S.
- Amery Hill School, near Alton, Hampshire, England
