= 1921–22 Tranmere Rovers F.C. season =

Tranmere Rovers F.C.
1921–22 season
- Chairman: WH Stott
- Manager: Bert Cooke
- Stadium: Prenton Park
- Football League Third Division North: 18th (of 20)
- FA Cup: Fourth Qualifying Round (eliminated by Altrincham)
- Top goalscorer: League: Groves (7); All: Bullough, Groves (7)
- Highest home attendance: 10,000 vs Southport (18 April 1922)
- Lowest home attendance: 3,000 vs Durham City (1 April 1922)
- Average home league attendance: 6,287
Team colours

The 1921–22 season was the first season of league football played by Tranmere Rovers. They joined the Football League Third Division North, when it was established after the restructuring of the English league system. The club played their first fixture, against Crewe Alexandra, at Prenton Park on 27 August 1921, winning 4–1.

Rovers ended the season in 18th place out of 20 teams, finishing ahead on goal average from Halifax Town, who had to apply for re-election. They were eliminated from the FA Cup in the Fourth Qualifying Round, losing a replay to non-league Altrincham.

== Review ==
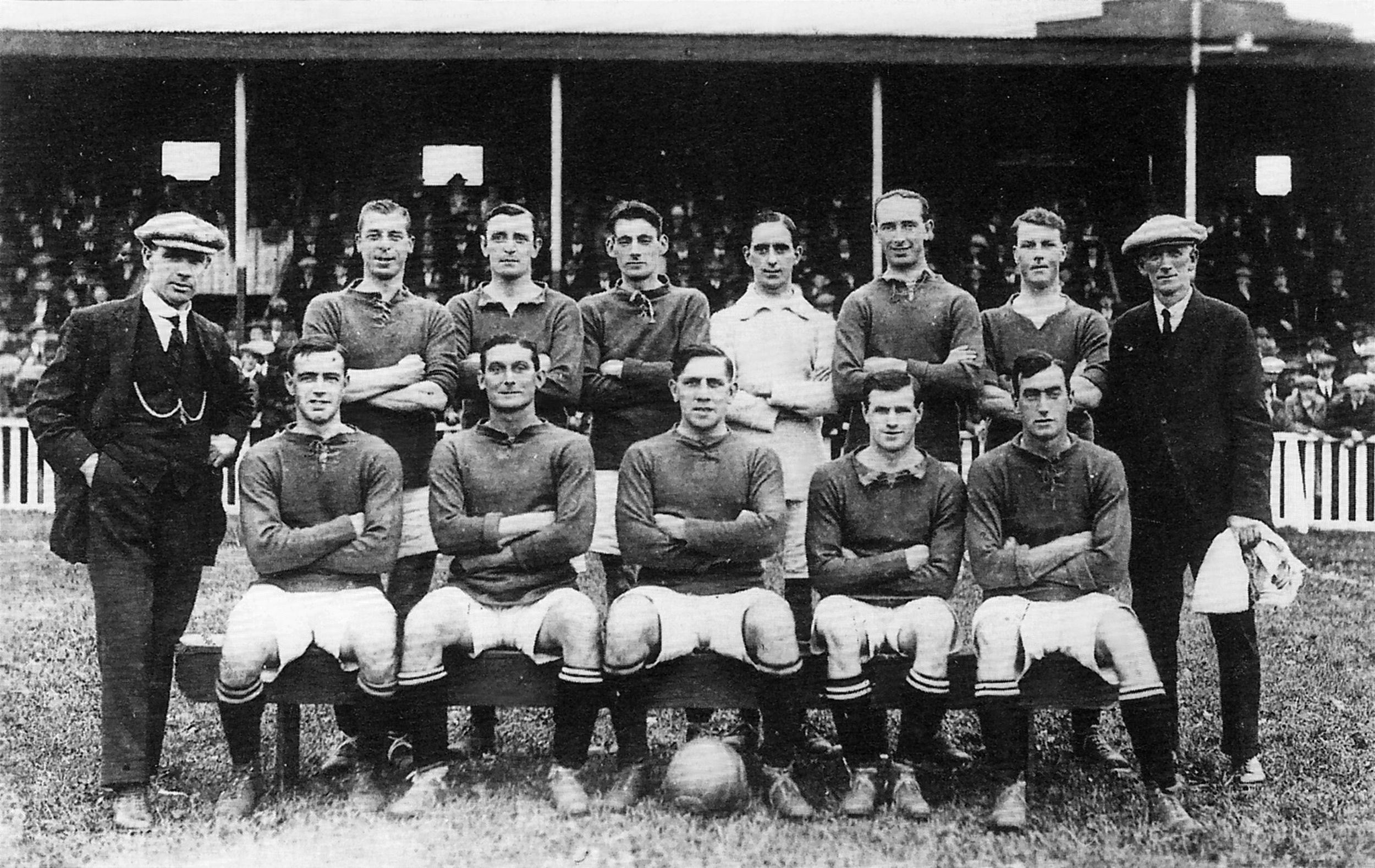
Before first Football League match

Prior to the start of the 1919–20 season, The Football League had formed a new Third Division, composed primarily of southern teams. On 7 March 1921, Tranmere – then members of the Central League – were invited to become founder members of the new Division Three North. At this time the team were managed by Bert Cooke, who did so for 23 years in total, the club record for longest serving manager.

In preparation for their new football league status, Tranmere made eleven new signings, meaning there were 25 professional players by the start of the season. They also bought the freehold on their ground, Prenton Park, for £7,500. Unlike their neighbours Everton and Liverpool, Tranmere could not sustain such growth and were forced to raise admission prices, causing an outcry amongst fans.

On 27 August 1921 at 3:15 pm, Tranmere started their first Football League match against Crewe Alexandra at Prenton Park. Attendance was affected by the new ticket prices, with 7,011 spectators present. Billy Caulfield scored first for Crewe, with Charles Milnes equalising for Tranmere as they went on to a 4–1 victory.

Tranmere's first six games produced two wins, two draws and two defeats. However, they performed poorly over the rest of the season. They were eliminated from the FA Cup in the Fourth Qualifying Round, losing 4–2 to non-league Altrincham at home, after a 4–4 away draw, and thus being the Robins' first ever league victims. They finished 18th of 20 in the league, only finishing ahead of Halifax Town on goal average, who had to apply for re-election.

The optimism felt by the directors at the start of the season about being on par with their Merseyside rivals changed to uncertainty. This is reflected in the statistics for the season: thirty-one players were used in total, with only seven making more than twenty appearances; the top league scorer was Fred Groves, with seven goals.

=== Third Division North ===
| Pos | Team | Pld | W | D | L | GF | GA | GAv | Pts | Qualification or relegation |
|---|---|---|---|---|---|---|---|---|---|---|
| 16 | Nelson | 38 | 13 | 7 | 18 | 48 | 66 | 0.727 | 33 | |
| 17 | Wigan Borough | 38 | 11 | 9 | 18 | 46 | 72 | 0.639 | 31 | |
| 18 | Tranmere Rovers | 38 | 9 | 11 | 18 | 51 | 61 | 0.836 | 29 | |
| 19 | Halifax Town | 38 | 10 | 9 | 19 | 56 | 76 | 0.737 | 29 | Re-elected |
| 20 | Rochdale | 38 | 11 | 4 | 23 | 52 | 77 | 0.675 | 26 | Re-elected |

Source: rsssf.com

== Results ==
All data relating to league, FA Cup and other matches, and own goal scorers are sourced from Upton and Wilson (1997). In the results column, Tranmere's score is given first. H, A and N refer to home, away and neutral venues, respectively.

=== Football League Third Division North ===
| Date | Opponents | Venue | Result | Score | Scorers | Attendance |
|---|---|---|---|---|---|---|
| 27 August 1921 | Crewe Alexandra | H | W | 4–1 | Stuart, Milnes, Groves, Ford | 7,011 |
| 3 September 1921 | Crewe Alexandra | A | D | 1–1 | Prentice | 8,000 |
| 10 September 1921 | Walsall | H | L | 0–1 | | 8,446 |
| 17 September 1921 | Walsall | A | L | 0–2 | | 11,000 |
| 24 September 1921 | Halifax Town | H | D | 2–2 | Bullough, Prentice | 7,000 |
| 1 October 1921 | Halifax Town | A | W | 2–0 | Groves, Bullough | 8,000 |
| 8 October 1921 | Rochdale | A | L | 1–2 | Bullough | 6,000 |
| 15 October 1921 | Rochdale | H | W | 7–0 | Groves (2), Bullough, Cunningham (4) | 6,000 |
| 22 October 1921 | Stalybridge Celtic | H | W | 4–1 | Campbell, Ford, Groves, Cunningham | 5,000 |
| 29 October 1921 | Stalybridge Celtic | A | L | 0–4 | | 6,000 |
| 5 November 1921 | Wigan Borough | A | D | 0–0 | | 10,000 |
| 12 November 1921 | Wigan Borough | H | W | 2–0 | Groves (2) | 8,000 |
| 26 November 1921 | Hartlepools United | A | D | 0–0 | | 6,000 |
| 10 December 1921 | Southport | A | D | 1–1 | Bullough | 5,000 |
| 17 December 1921 | Stockport County | H | L | 0–2 | | 8,000 |
| 24 December 1921 | Stockport County | A | D | 0–0 | | 8,000 |
| 26 December 1921 | Ashington | H | L | 2–3 | Hilton, Cunningham | 8,000 |
| 27 December 1921 | Hartlepools United | H | L | 1–2 | Prentice | 7,000 |
| 31 December 1921 | Grimsby Town | H | D | 2–2 | Roberts, Lloyy | 6,000 |
| 14 January 1922 | Grimsby Town | A | L | 1–5 | Hilton | 7,000 |
| 21 January 1922 | Accrington Stanley | H | L | 2–4 | Moreton, Ford | 4,000 |
| 28 January 1922 | Accrington Stanley | A | L | 0–3 | | 5,000 |
| 4 February 1922 | Darlington | A | L | 0–4 | | 3,000 |
| 11 February 1922 | Darlington | H | L | 0–1 | | 6,000 |
| 18 February 1922 | Lincoln City | A | L | 1–4 | Stuart | 4,000 |
| 25 February 1922 | Lincoln City | H | W | 4–0 | Mercer, Moreton, Fulton, Ward (o.g.) | 5,000 |
| 4 March 1922 | Ashington | A | L | 0–1 | | 4,200 |
| 18 March 1922 | Barrow | H | D | 2–2 | Stuart, Fulton | 4,000 |
| 25 March 1922 | Barrow | A | L | 0–2 | | 4,000 |
| 1 April 1922 | Durham | H | D | 3–3 | Ford, Fulton, Musgrove (o.g.) | 3,000 |
| 8 April 1922 | Durham | A | L | 0–3 | | 1,500 |
| 14 April 1922 | Chesterfield | H | W | 2–0 | Moreton, Lloyd | 8,000 |
| 15 April 1922 | Wrexham | H | D | 0–0 | | 6,000 |
| 17 April 1922 | Chesterfield | A | L | 0–3 | | 6,000 |
| 18 April 1922 | Southport | H | L | 0–1 | | 10,000 |
| 22 April 1922 | Wrexham | A | W | 3–1 | Stuart, Rainford (2) | 3,700 |
| 29 April 1922 | Nelson | H | W | 4–0 | Campbell, Milnes, Moreton, Rainford | 3,000 |
| 6 May 1922 | Nelson | A | D | 0–0 | | |

=== FA Cup ===
| Date | Opponents | Venue | Result | Score | Scorers | Attendance | Notes |
|---|---|---|---|---|---|---|---|
| 19 November 1921 | Altrincham | A | D | 4–4 | Cook, Bullough, Prentice (2) | 2,000 | Fourth Qualifying Round |
| 24 November 1921 | Altrincham | H | L | 2–4 | Cook, Bullough | 4,000 | Replay |

=== Secondary fixtures ===
| Date | Competition | Opponents | Venue | Result | Score | Scorers | Attendance | Notes |
|---|---|---|---|---|---|---|---|---|
| 28 September 1921 | Cheshire Senior Medals | Stockport County | A | L | 0–3 | | | |
| 5 April 1922 | Liverpool Senior Cup | New Brighton | A | W | 4–2 | | | |
| 1 May 1922 | Liverpool Senior Cup | Everton | N | L | 0–1 | | | At Anfield |
| 8 May 1922 | Liverpool County Medals | Skelmersdale United | N | W | 2–0 | | | At Goodison Park |
| 11 May 1922 | Liverpool County Medals | Marine | N | W | 2–0 | | | At Anfield, semi-final |
| 13 May 1922 | Liverpool County Medals | Liverpool | A | W | 2–0 | | 14,000 | Final |
| 23 February 1922 | Friendly | Unemployed XI | H | W | 4–0 | | | Raised £33 for the National Unemployed Workers' Movement |
| 11 March 1922 | Friendly | Crewe Alexandra | H | W | 5–1 | | | |
| 22 April 1922 | Friendly | League XI | H | L | 0–2 | | | |
| 4 May 1922 | Friendly | Stoke City | H | W | 4–3 | | 1,000 | Testimonial for Moreton, Cunningham and Leck |

== Player statistics ==
Bert Cooke used a total of 31 players during the 1921–22 season and there were fifteen different goalscorers. The team played in a 2–3–5 formation (the standard formation at the time) throughout the campaign, with two fullbacks, three halfbacks, two outside forwards, two inside forwards and a centre forward. Harry Bradshaw – the goalkeeper – played in every league and cup game, whilst Tom Stuart – a left back – missed just one match, the defeat to Accrington Stanley on 21 January. All data relating to appearances and first names are sourced from Upton and Wilson (1997).

| Name | Position | League apps | League goals | FA Cup apps | FA Cup goals | Total apps | Total goals |
|---|---|---|---|---|---|---|---|
| Edmund Baldwin | CF | 1 | 0 | 0 | 0 | 1 | 0 |
| Harry Bradshaw | G | 38 | 0 | 2 | 0 | 40 | 0 |
| Denis Bullough | CF | 9 | 5 | 2 | 2 | 11 | 7 |
| Johnny Campbell | WH | 26 | 2 | 2 | 0 | 28 | 0 |
| Fred Cook | OR | 16 | 0 | 2 | 2 | 18 | 2 |
| Charlie Cunningham | IL | 32 | 6 | 2 | 0 | 38 | 6 |
| Peter Fairclough | LH | 8 | 0 | 0 | 0 | 8 | 0 |
| John Ford | IR | 15 | 4 | 0 | 0 | 15 | 4 |
| Allen Forshaw | RB | 1 | 0 | 0 | 0 | 1 | 0 |
| David Fulton | CF | 8 | 3 | 0 | 0 | 8 | 3 |
| John Grainger | RB | 1 | 0 | 0 | 0 | 1 | 0 |
| Fred Groves | IR | 12 | 7 | 0 | 0 | 12 | 7 |
| Charlie Hayes | RB | 17 | 0 | 2 | 0 | 19 | 0 |
| Tom Heslop | LH | 8 | 0 | 0 | 0 | 8 | 0 |
| Harold Hilton | IR | 18 | 2 | 0 | 0 | 18 | 2 |
| Thomas Hughes | OL | 3 | 0 | 0 | 0 | 3 | 0 |
| James Hyam | CF | 1 | 0 | 0 | 0 | 1 | 0 |
| Evan Lloyd | CF | 11 | 2 | 0 | 0 | 11 | 2 |
| Joe Mercer | CH | 16 | 1 | 2 | 0 | 18 | 1 |
| Charlie Milnes | CH | 16 | 2 | 0 | 0 | 16 | 2 |
| George Moorhouse | OL | 2 | 0 | 0 | 0 | 2 | 0 |
| Jimmy Moreton | OR | 26 | 4 | 2 | 0 | 28 | 4 |
| James Niven | LB | 17 | 0 | 0 | 0 | 17 | 0 |
| John Prentice | OL | 23 | 3 | 2 | 2 | 25 | 4 |
| Billy Rainford | IL | 15 | 3 | 0 | 0 | 15 | 3 |
| James Roberts | OL | 32 | 1 | 2 | 0 | 34 | 1 |
| Alfred Robinson | IR | 4 | 0 | 0 | 0 | 4 | 0 |
| Tom Stott | CF | 1 | 0 | 0 | 0 | 1 | 0 |
| Tom Stuart | LB | 37 | 4 | 2 | 0 | 39 | 4 |
| Arthur Sugden | RB | 3 | 0 | 0 | 0 | 3 | 0 |
| Edward Winn | CH | 1 | 0 | 0 | 0 | 1 | 0 |
