= Emmery =

Emmery is a surname. Notable people with the surname include:

- Frederik Emmery (born 2006), Danish footballer
- Isabelle Emmery (born 1966), Belgian politician

== See also ==
- Emmer
- Amery
