= Arnold Knight =

Arnold Night is the name of:

- Arnold Knight (footballer) (1919–2003), English footballer
- Saturday Knight (Arnold Sedgfield Knight, 1885–1946), South African rugby union player
