= Joseph Mercer =

Joseph Mercer may refer to:

- Joe Mercer (1914–1990), English football player and manager
- Joe Mercer (footballer, born 1889) (1889–1927), English footballer & father of Joe Mercer (b.1914)
- Joe Mercer (jockey) (1934–2021), English jockey
- Joseph Wayne Mercer (1845–1906), American politician in Missouri
