= Leddy =

Leddy is a surname. Notable people with the surname include:

- Bernard Joseph Leddy (1910–1972), United States federal judge
- Bruce Leddy, writer, director, and producer currently living in Los Angeles
- Francis Leddy OC, Ph.D. (1911–1998), Canadian academic and President of the University of Windsor from 1964 to 1978
- Eddie Leddy (born 1951), Irish long-distance runner
- Harold Leddy (1893–1971), Australian rugby league footballer
- Harry Leddy (1884–?), Irish footballer
- James P. Leddy (born 1942), Democratic member of the Vermont State Senate, who represented the Chittenden senate district
- John Leddy (1930–2022), Dutch actor
- John M. Leddy (1914–1997), official in the United States Department of State, who mainly focused on U.S. trade policy
- Mary Jo Leddy, CM (born 1946), Canadian writer, speaker, theologian and social activist
- Nick Leddy (born 1991), American professional ice hockey defenseman, currently playing with the New York Islanders organization
- Robert Leddy, provincial politician from Alberta, Canada
- Glen Leddy, Irish professional E-Sports player.
- Chris Leddy, Second Degree Brazilian Jiu Jitsu Black belt and five time Dublin Open champion.
- Adam Leddy, Brazilian Jiu Jitsu Black belt and actor. Irish.
