= Lingdale =

Village in North Yorkshire, England

Coordinates: 54°32′N 0°57′W

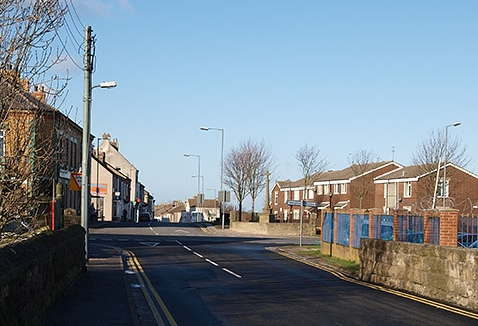
- Crossroads at the centre of Lingdale
- Unitary authority: Redcar and Cleveland
- Ceremonial county: North Yorkshire
- Region: North East
- Country: England
- Sovereign state: United Kingdom
- Post town: Saltburn-by-the-Sea
- Postcode district: TS12
- Police: Cleveland
- Fire: Cleveland
- Ambulance: North East
- UK Parliament: Middlesbrough South and East Cleveland

Lingdale is a village in the unitary authority of Redcar and Cleveland and the ceremonial county of North Yorkshire, England. The village was created with the advent of ironstone mining in the area, in the early 19th century.

== History ==
Lingdale was built in the 1870s as a village for the ironstone mine workers and was next to an ironstone mine. The mine was served by a railway which existed to carry iron-ore for the Lingdale mine, until its closure in 1964. The spoil from the mine was transported across Stanghow Road via a bridge, this massive spoil heap, referred to as the 'Shale Heap' has since been cleared and turned into Lingdale Wildlife Meadow.

Although originally a village exclusively for mine workers, Lingdale slowly developed to be a village for all to make their home in. After the closure of the mines, in 1962, all the mine workers' houses became vacant and non-miners were able to live in them. Today, 1980s social housing has mostly replaced the mine workers' houses. Many of Lingdale's older Victorian houses, not associated with mine workers, still stand however, as does the Lingdale United Reformed Church, a Victorian chapel-like building, St Chad's Church, and the former Primitive Methodist Church having since become a house. This is excepting the Brunswick Methodist Chapel on Scarth Street, which has been demolished.

The village was home to two pubs, the Lingdale Tavern which survives today, and the now demolished Victoria Hotel, both on the High Street.

Lingdale was once served by the Lingdale County Primary School on Cockburn street, this has seen been converted to housing and partially demolished, and an Infant School on Davison Street now demolished. The Village is now served by Lingdale Primary School on Davison Street.

== Mining disaster of 1953 ==
On 24 August 1953, 15 men were critically injured in a gas explosion in the south-west dips district of Lingdale Ironstone Mine. During the days that followed, eight men died due to shock and the severity of their burns.

An hour and a half after the start of the morning shift there was an ignition of gas in the mine and several miners were badly burned. They were working about 1.5 miles (2.4 km) from the pithead when the explosion occurred and were 600 feet (180 m) underground.

== Lingdale brass band ==
It was very common in the past, for mining communities to have a brass band, and Lingdale was no exception. A brass band was formed in 1851, as Lingdale Ironstone Miners' Band. It later became known as Lingdale Silver Band, Lingdale Silver (ICI Chemical Products) Band (from 1986). In 1998, the band merged with the Yarm & District Band to form Lockwood Band.

== Notable people ==
Jack Curnow, a professional football goalkeeper, was born in Lingdale in 1910.

Adam Boyes, a professional footballer, was born in Lingdale in 1990.

Birthplace of Bobby Smith, former Spurs and England centre-forward, who played in their double-winning side of 1961, and scored in the FA Cup Final, on two separate occasions.

Arnold Knight, played for Spurs and also Leeds United

Bobby Smith's brother Keith, played for Chelsea and then Millwall

George Hardwick captained Middlesbrough, England, and is the only player to have captained a Great Britain side (outside of the Olympic Games).

Mary Reveley an English racehorse trainer. She trained over 2,000 winners in a 26-year career, was the first woman to saddle 100 winners in a calendar year (in 1991), and also became the first female trainer to saddle 50 winners on the flat (in 1992).
