= James Carney =

James Carney may refer to:

- James Carney (scholar) (1914–1989), Irish Celtic studies scholar
- James Carney (bishop) (1915–1990), Archbishop of the Roman Catholic Archdiocese of Vancouver
- James Carney (American priest) (1924–1983), American priest in Honduras during the civil war
- Jim Carney (poet) (born 1950), Irish poet
- Jay Carney (James Carney, born 1965), White House Press Secretary
- James Carney (cyclist) (born 1968), American Olympic cyclist, founder of C.A.R.E. for Cycling, Inc.
- James Carney, actor in Said O'Reilly to McNab
- Jimmy Carney (1891-1980), English footballer

== See also ==
- Jem Carney (1856–1941), English boxer
