= George Wilde =

George Wilde or George Wylde may refer to:

- George Wylde I (or Wilde; 1550–1616), English lawyer and politician
- George Wylde II (or Wilde; 1594–1650), English lawyer and politician (son of the above)
- George Wilde (bishop) (1610–1665), bishop of Derry
- George Wilde (American football) (1923–1975), American football player

== See also ==
- George Wild (footballer)
- George Wyld (1821-1906), Scottish homeopathic physician and Christian Theosophist
