= John Prentice =

John Prentice may refer to:

- John Prentice (businessman), chairman of the Shanghai Municipal Council
- John Prentice (cartoonist)
- John Prentice (footballer, born 1898)
- John Prentice (footballer, born 1926)
- John Rockefeller Prentice (1902–1972), lawyer
- John Prentice, fictional character played by Sidney Poitier in the 1967 film Guess Who's Coming to Dinner

== See also ==
- John Prentis, mayor of Williamsburg, Virginia
- John Holmes Prentiss, U.S. Representative
