= Thomas Naylor (disambiguation) =

Thomas Naylor may refer to:

- Thomas Naylor (politician) (1868-1958), UK Politician
- Tommy Naylor (footballer, born 1903) (1903-1962), English footballer, see List of Tranmere Rovers F.C. players (1921–1939)
- Thomas Naylor (1936-2012), American economist and professor
- Tommy Naylor (footballer, born 1946) (1946-2010), English footballer, see List of Hereford United F.C. players

== See also ==
- Tom Naylor (disambiguation)
