= Alice Woods (footballer) =

English footballer

Personal information
- Full name: Alice Stanley
- Date of birth: 20 March 1899
- Place of birth: Sutton, St Helens, England
- Date of death: 1991 (aged 91–92)
- Place of death: Manchester, England
- Height: 1.65 m (5 ft 5 in)
- Position: Midfielder

Senior career*
| Years | Team | Apps | (Gls) |
| 1919 | St Helens Ladies | | |
| 1919–1928 | Dick, Kerr Ladies | | |
- * Club domestic league appearances and goals as of 09:14, 1 June 2019 (UTC) ‡ National team caps and goals as of 09:14, 1 June 2019 (UTC)

Alice Stanley (née Woods; 20 March 1899 – 1991) was an English footballer. She played for Dick, Kerr Ladies, one of the earliest women's association football teams. She was also a sprinter and one of the first women to race under Amateur Athletic Association of England (AAA) laws.

== Early life ==
Woods was born in Sutton, St Helens, in 1899, the youngest of seven children in a mining family. Her father died in 1902, and her brother James assumed the role of head of the household. She attended Sutton National School. As a teenager she won several local sprint races.

In 1917, Woods started working at a munitions factory in St Helens, where she began playing football. She played her first organised football match in 1918, and in the same year became the first woman to win a race held under Amateur Athletic Association of England (AAA) laws. This historic meet, held in Blackpool in 1918, was the first in England to allow women runners, with thirteen female athletes competing in the 80-yard race. Woods developed a rivalry with Elaine Burton.

== Club career ==
Having lost her job in the munitions factory at the end of World War I, Woods was a founding member of the St Helens Ladies football team. Her brother John Woods, who was playing for Halifax Town at the time, was a coach for the team.

In the St Helens team's second match, they were beaten 6–1 by Dick, Kerr Ladies; as St Helens' only goalscorer, midfielder Woods and her teammate Lily Parr caught the attention of Dick, Kerr manager Alfred Frankland. Soon afterwards, Woods began playing for the Preston-based side. According to verbal evidence from Alice Norris, it was Woods who suggested to team manager Alfred Frankland that Lily Parr would be a good addition to the club.

Woods scored her first goal for the Dick, Kerr Ladies against a touring team from France on 1 May 1920. Later that year, she travelled to France with the team and also played in the Boxing Day match at Goodison Park. Woods has been described as a "crowd magnet" who helped boost the team's popularity. She also went on tour to the United States in 1922.

== Personal life ==
Woods retired from football in 1928 when she married Herbert Stanley. After starting a family together, the couple moved to Heaton Moor, where Woods remained for the rest of her life. Woods had four children and became known to her family as 'Grandma Boss'. She died peacefully at her home in Manchester in 1991, aged 92.

Woods' granddaughter Gaynor Stanley competed in swimming at the 1984 Los Angeles Olympics. Her great-granddaughter Lauren Quigley also became a swimmer and won three silver medals at the Commonwealth Games.
