= Gaynor Stanley =

British swimmer

Personal information
- Full name: Gaynor Clare Stanley
- Born: 3 January 1966 (age 60) Manchester, England

Sport
- Sport: Swimming

Gaynor Clare Stanley (born 3 January 1966) is a retired British swimmer. Stanley competed in three events at the 1984 Summer Olympics. She represented England in the 200 metres breaststroke, at the 1982 Commonwealth Games in Brisbane, Queensland, Australia. Four years later she represented England in the 200 metres breaststroke, 400 metres individual medley and 800 metres freestyle, at the 1986 Commonwealth Games in Edinburgh, Scotland. She won the 1982 ASA National Championship title in the 200 metres breaststroke and the 1987 400 metres medley title.

== Personal life ==
Stanley is the granddaughter of the footballer Alice Woods.
