= Harry Bradshaw (footballer, born 1895) =

English footballer

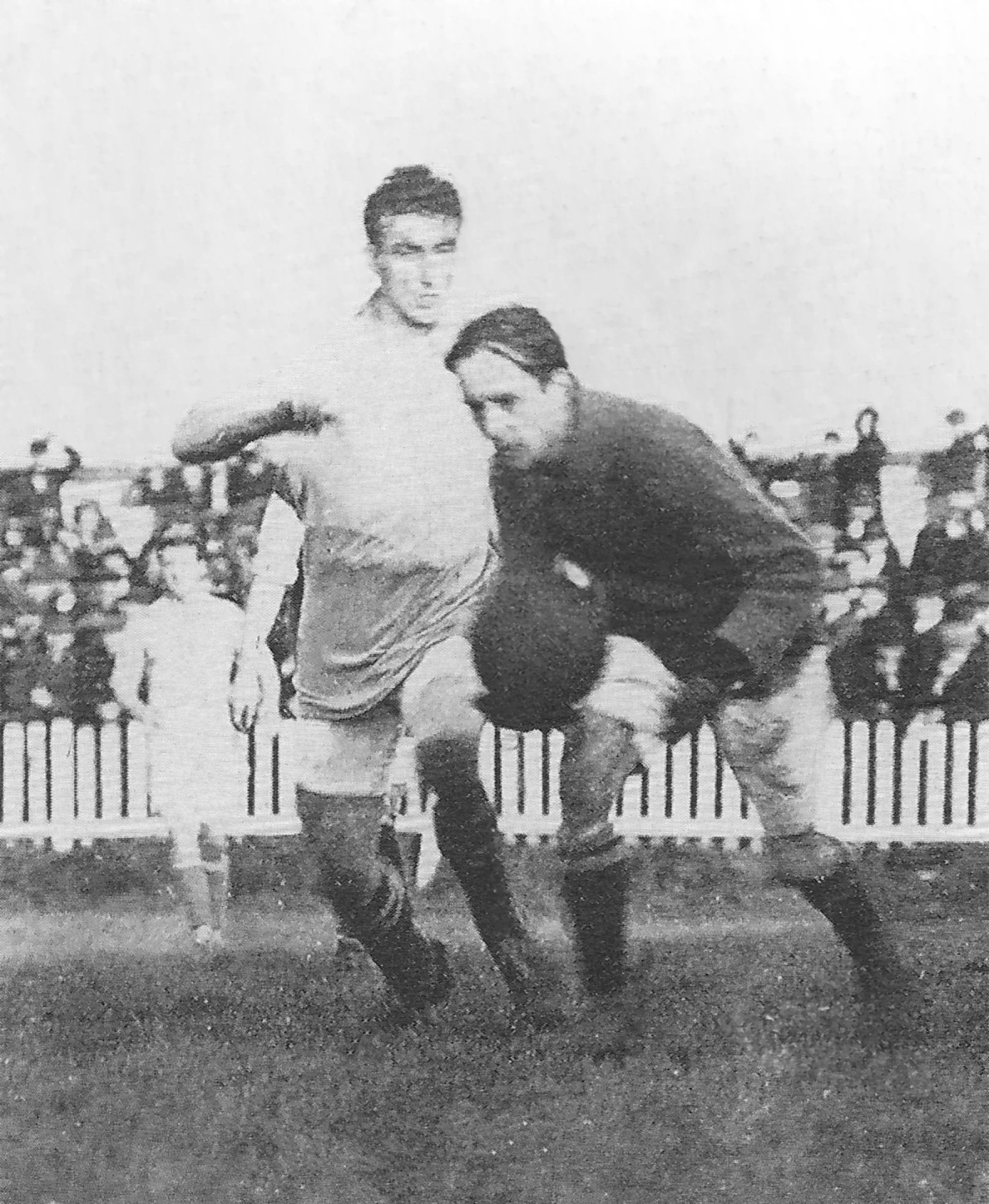
- Bradshaw (right) saves from Stan Rowlands

Personal information
- Date of birth: 22 January 1895
- Place of birth: Liverpool, England
- Height: 5 ft 8 1/2 in (1.74 m)
- Position: Goalkeeper

Senior career*
Years	Team	Apps	(Gls)
- South Liverpool
1921–1923	Tranmere Rovers	59	(0)
1923–	Ellesmere Port Cement		
- * Club domestic league appearances and goals

Harry Bradshaw (22 January 1895 – after 1923) was an English footballer.

He was a goalkeeper at South Liverpool before moving to Tranmere Rovers. He played every game for Tranmere in the 1921–22 season, their first in the Football League. In 1923 he moved to Ellesmere Port Cement.
