= Albert Fairclough =

English footballer

Personal information
- Full name: Albert Fairclough
- Date of birth: 4 October 1891
- Place of birth: St Helens, England
- Date of death: 5 November 1958 (aged 67)
- Place of death: Stockport, England
- Height: 5 ft 7 1/2 in (1.71 m)
- Position: Centre forward

Senior career*
Years	Team	Apps	(Gls)
1909–1910	Windle Villa		
1910–1911	St Helens Town		
1911–1912	St Helens Recreation		
1912–1913	Eccles Borough		
1913–1919	Manchester City	5	(1)
1920–1921	Southend United	24	(15)
1921–1924	Bristol City	91	(44)
1924–1927	Derby County	37	(26)
1927	Gillingham	11	(3)
- * Club domestic league appearances and goals

Albert Fairclough (4 October 1891 – 5 November 1958), sometimes known as Fairy Fairclough, was an English professional footballer who played as a centre forward in the Football League for Bristol City, Derby County, Southend United, Gillingham and Manchester City.

== Career ==
A centre forward, Fairclough began his career in non-league football, before he and his brother Peter transferred to First Division club Manchester City in March 1913. The First World War hampered Fairclough's career at Hyde Road, though he top-scored for the club's reserve team in the 1913–14, 1914–15 and 1919–20 seasons. He made just five first team appearances for City, scoring one goal. In May 1920, Fairclough dropped down to the Third Division to join Southend United and earned the distinction of scoring the club's first Football League goal. He subsequently played in all three divisions of the Football League and scored 88 goals in 163 league appearances for Southend United, Bristol City, Derby County and Gillingham, before retiring at the end of the 1926–27 season.

== Personal life ==
Fairclough was the older brother of footballer Peter Fairclough. In October 1915, 14 months after the outbreak of the First World War, Fairclough enlisted in the Loyal North Lancashire Regiment. He was later appointed a lance corporal and saw action on the Western Front, Salonika and Egypt.

== Honours ==
Bristol City

- Football League Third Division South: 1922–23

== Career statistics ==
Appearances and goals by club, season and competition
Club	Season	League			National Cup		Total	
Club	Season	Division	Apps	Goals	Apps	Goals	Apps	Goals
Manchester City	1913–14	First Division	2	1	0	0	2	1
Manchester City	1914–15	First Division	1	0	0	0	1	0
Manchester City	1919–20	First Division	2	0	0	0	2	0
Manchester City	Total		5	1	0	0	5	1
Southend United	1920–21	Third Division	24	15	2	0	26	15
Derby County	1924–25	Second Division	32	22	0	0	32	22
Derby County	1925–26	Second Division	2	2	0	0	2	2
Derby County	1926–27	First Division	3	2	0	0	3	2
Derby County	Total		37	26	0	0	37	26
Gillingham	1926–27	Third Division South	11	3	—		11	3
Career total			77	45	2	0	79	45
