= Tom Naylor (disambiguation) =

Tom Naylor may refer to:

- Tom Naylor, British figure skater and doctor see List of Dancing on Ice professional skaters
- Tom Naylor (born 1991), English footballer

== See also ==
- Thomas Naylor (disambiguation)
