= Tommy Gibson =

Scottish footballer

Personal information
- Full name: Thomas Gibson
- Date of birth: 23 December 1888
- Place of birth: Maxwelltown, Scotland
- Height: 5 ft 10 in (1.78 m)
- Positions: Full back; centre forward

Senior career*
Years	Team	Apps	(Gls)
–1906	Maxwelltown Volunteers		
1906–1907	Morton	3	(0)
1907–1919	Nottingham Forest	186	(32)
1916	→ Heart of Midlothian (loan)	10	(6)
1919–1923	Notts County	63	(5)
1923–1924	Southend United	5	(0)
- * Club domestic league appearances and goals

Thomas Gibson was a Scottish professional footballer who made over 180 appearances as a full back in the Football League for Nottingham Forest and captained the club. He also played in the Scottish League for Heart of Midlothian and Morton.

== Personal life ==
On 16 December 1914, four months after the outbreak of the First World War and the day after the Football Battalion of the Middlesex Regiment was established, Gibson and Nottingham Forest teammates Harry Iremonger and Joe Mercer travelled down to London to enlist. Gibson served as a company sergeant major in the 1st Football Battalion and held the rank of warrant officer class II. He was partially buried by a shell explosion on the Somme and developed shell shock.

== Career statistics ==
Appearances and goals by club, season and competition
Club	Season	League			National Cup		Other		Total	
Club	Season	Division	Apps	Goals	Apps	Goals	Apps	Goals	Apps	Goals
Morton	1906–07	Scottish Second Division	3	0	0	0	―		3	0
Nottingham Forest	1907–08	First Division	10	0	0	0	―		10	0
Nottingham Forest	1908–09	First Division	7	0	0	0	―		7	0
Nottingham Forest	1909–10	First Division	3	0	0	0	―		3	0
Nottingham Forest	1910–11	First Division	18	0	0	0	―		18	0
Nottingham Forest	1911–12	Second Division	36	3	1	0	―		37	3
Nottingham Forest	1912–13	Second Division	31	18	2	3	―		33	21
Nottingham Forest	1913–14	Second Division	36	5	2	0	―		38	5
Nottingham Forest	1914–15	Second Division	36	5	2	0	―		38	5
Nottingham Forest	1919–20	Second Division	9	1	0	0	―		9	1
Nottingham Forest	Total		186	32	7	3	―		183	35
Heart of Midlothian (loan)	1916–17	Scottish First Division	9	4	―		1 (Note: Appearance in Wilson Cup)	0	10	4
Notts County	1922–23	Second Division	4	0	0	0	―		4	0
Southend United	1923–24	Third Division South	5	0	―		―		5	0
Career total			207	36	7	3	1	0	215	39
