= Bill Edmunds =

English footballer (1898–1964)

Personal information
- Full name: William Edmunds
- Date of birth: 23 January 1898
- Place of birth: Trimdon Grange, England
- Date of death: 6 November 1964 (aged 66)
- Place of death: Trimdon Village, England
- Height: 5 ft 8 in (1.73 m)
- Position: Centre forward

Senior career*
Years	Team	Apps	(Gls)
- Shildon
- Spennymoor United
1921–1922	Darlington	8	(6)
- Trimdon Grange
- * Club domestic league appearances and goals

William Edmunds (23 January 1898 – 6 November 1964) was an English professional footballer who played as a centre forward in the Football League for Darlington. He also played non-league football in the north-east of England for clubs including Shildon, Spennymoor United and Trimdon Grange.

== Life and career ==
Edmunds was born in Trimdon Grange, County Durham, the third child of James Edmunds, a coal miner, and his wife Sarah. He played North-Eastern League football for clubs including Shildon and Spennymoor United before, at the age of 23, signing for Darlington ahead of their first season in the Football League. A "towering centre forward", Edmunds went straight into the first eleven for the opening match, at home to Halifax Town in the newly formed Third Division North. He scored a late consolation goal in a 5–1 loss in the reverse fixture, but was left out in favour of George Stevens for the next match, a 7–0 defeat of Chesterfield, and dropped into the reserves.

A scoring spree in the North-Eastern League after Christmas earned him a recall to the first team. He duly scored three times as Darlington beat Tranmere Rovers 4–1 at home, and played in the next five matches, scoring twice (against Stalybridge Celtic and Wigan Borough) before returning to the reserves. At the end of the season, he played on the losing side in the Durham Senior Cup final against Sunderland reserves.

At the time of the 1939 Register, Edmunds was working as a mental nurse at Winterton Hospital, Sedgefield. He died in Trimdon Village in 1964 at the age of 66.
