= Amery School District =

School district in Wisconsin, United States

Coordinates: 45°18′08″N 92°21′02″W

School District of Amery

Address
- 555 Minneapolis Ave S Amery, Wisconsin; USA

District information
- Type: Public School

Students and staff
- Students: 1650
- District mascot: Warrior
- Colors: White, Red, Black

Other information
- Website: amerysd.k12.wi.us

The School District of Amery is school district located in Amery, Wisconsin, United States. It serves students from early childhood through 12th grade. The School District of Amery has four buildings located on a campus within the Amery City limits and the buildings are as follows, Amery High School, Amery Middle School, Amery Intermediate School, Amery Lien Elementary School.
