= Amery Municipal Airport =

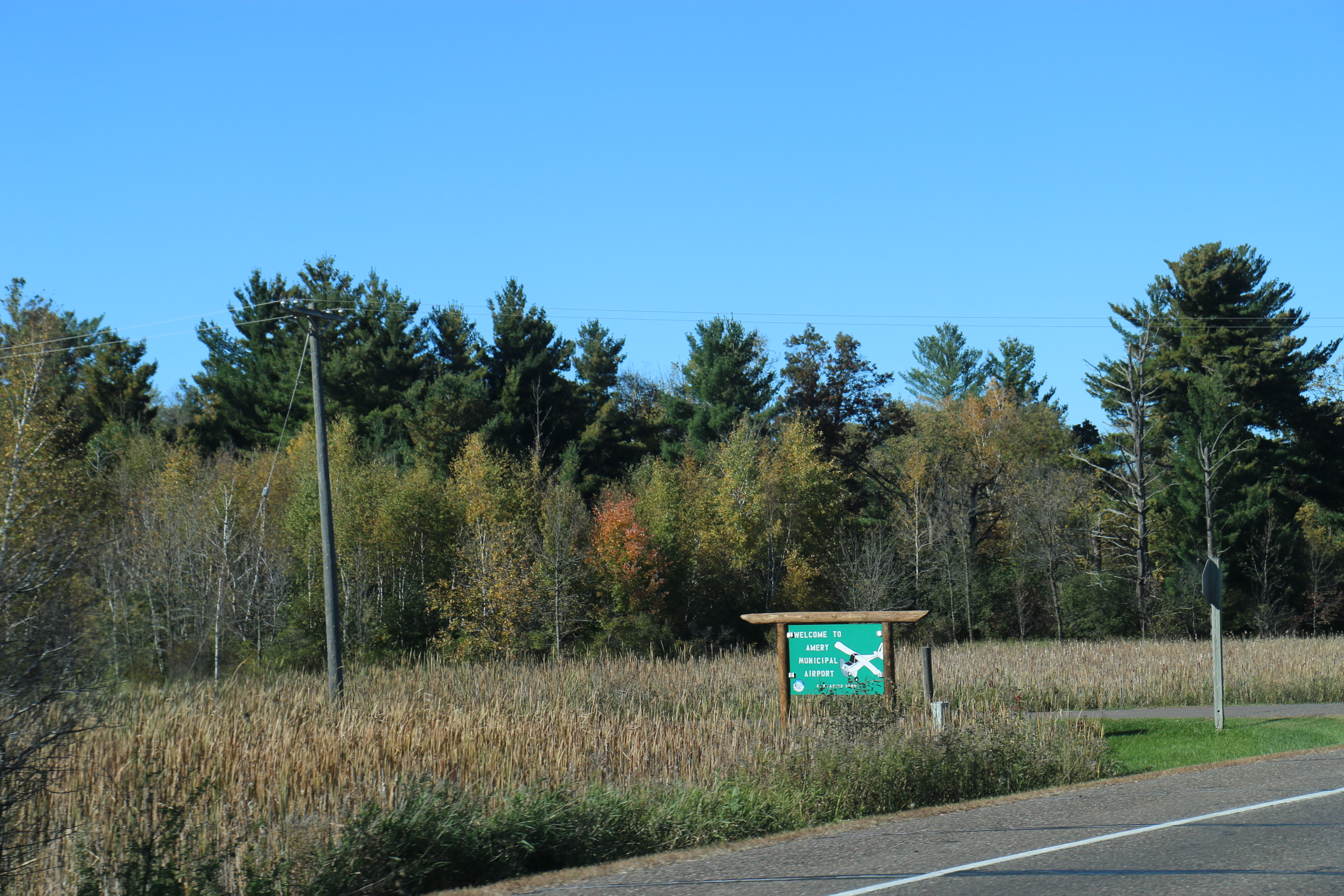
- IATA: AHH; ICAO: KAHH; FAA LID: AHH

Summary
- Airport type: Public
- Owner: City of Amery
- Serves: Amery, Wisconsin
- Opened: July 1969
- Time zone: CST (UTC−06:00)
  - Summer (DST): CDT (UTC−05:00)
- Elevation AMSL: 1,088 ft (332 m)
- Coordinates: 45°16′52″N 092°22′31″W

Map
- Location of airport in Wisconsin AHH (the United States)

Runways
Direction	Length		Surface
Direction	ft	m	Surface
18/36	4,000	1,219	Asphalt

Statistics
- Aircraft operations (2023): 13,900
- Based aircraft (2024): 27
- Source: Federal Aviation Administration

Amery Municipal Airport (IATA: AHH, ICAO: KAHH, FAA LID: AHH) is a city owned public use airport located two nautical miles (4 km) south of the central business district of Amery, a city in Polk County, Wisconsin, United States. It is included in the Federal Aviation Administration (FAA) National Plan of Integrated Airport Systems for 2025–2029, in which it is categorized as a local general aviation facility.

The airport was damaged by high winds in September 2005. Six planes were damaged and five hangars were destroyed.

== Facilities and aircraft ==
Amery Municipal Airport covers an area of 218 acres (88 ha) at an elevation of 1,088 feet (332 m) above mean sea level. It has one VASI equipped runway designated 18/36 with an asphalt surface measuring 4,000 by 75 feet (1,219 x 23 m).

For the 12-month period ending August 31, 2023, the airport had 13,900 aircraft operations, an average of 38 per day: 98% general aviation, 1% air taxi and 1% military.

In August 2024, there were 27 aircraft based at this airport: 24 single-engine and 3 ultralights.

== See also ==
- List of airports in Wisconsin
