= Billy Chesser =

English footballer

Personal information
- Full name: William Etheridge Chesser
- Date of birth: 11 August 1893
- Place of birth: Stockton-on-Tees, England
- Date of death: 27 October 1949 (aged 56)
- Place of death: Nottingham, England
- Position: Inside left

Senior career*
Years	Team	Apps	(Gls)
- Stockton
1911–1914	Bradford City	7	(2)
1914–1920	Lincoln City	76	(18)
1920–1921	Merthyr Town	28	(7)
1921–1922	Wigan Borough	13	(1)
1924	Lincoln City	0	(0)
- Lincoln Claytons
- * Club domestic league appearances and goals

William Etheridge Chesser (11 August 1893 – 27 October 1949) was an English professional footballer who scored 28 goals from 124 appearances in the Football League playing as an inside left for Bradford City, Lincoln City, Merthyr Town and Wigan Borough.

== Football career ==
Chesser was born in Stockton-on-Tees, County Durham. He played for his local team, Stockton, before signing for FA Cup-holders Bradford City in December 1911. He made his Football League First Division debut the following season, but played only seven League games for Bradford City, scoring twice, before moving down to the Second Division with Lincoln City for a fee of £600 in February 1914. He went straight into the first team, and by the time the First World War put a stop to League football, he had played 45 games. He played for Lincoln City regularly in the wartime competitions, and also made guest appearances for former club Bradford City. In 1919–20, the first post-war season, Chesser was Lincoln City's leading scorer, though with only eight goals as the club finished in 21st place in the League and failed to be re-elected.

Chesser moved to Merthyr Town, founder members of the newly formed Football League Third Division South. He stayed only one season with the club, but became part of their history by scoring the winning goal in their first Football League game, a 2–1 win at home to Crystal Palace. In 1921 he joined Wigan Borough, again for their first season in the Football League as founder members of the Third Division North. He played 13 League games before returning to Lincoln City, but made no more first-team appearances for the latter club. Chesser died on 27 October 1949 aged 56.
