= Gerald Roberts =

English footballer

Personal information
- Full name: Gerald Stanley Roberts
- Date of birth: 1 May 1908
- Place of birth: Bromborough, England
- Date of death: 16 July 1944 (aged 36)
- Place of death: Normandy, German-occupied France
- Position: Full back

Senior career*
Years	Team	Apps	(Gls)
1931	Bromborough Pool		
1932	Tranmere Rovers	2	(0)
- * Club domestic league appearances and goals

Gerald Stanley Roberts (1 May 1908 – 16 July 1944) was an English professional footballer who played as a full back in the Football League for Tranmere Rovers.

== Personal life ==
Roberts served as a serjeant in the 144th Regiment, Royal Armoured Corps (8th Battalion, East Lancashire Regiment) during the Second World War and was killed during the Battle of Normandy on 16 July 1944. He is buried at St. Manvieu War Cemetery, Cheux.

== Career statistics ==
Appearances and goals by club, season and competition
Club	Season	Division	League		FA Cup		Total	
Club	Season	Division	Apps	Goals	Apps	Goals	Apps	Goals
Tranmere Rovers	1932–33	Third Division North	2	0	0	0	2	0
Career total			2	0	0	0	2	0
