= Bill Amery =

Australian rules footballer

Personal information
- Full name: William Ernest Amery
- Born: 16 September 1894; Hawthorn, Victoria
- Died: 2 May 1966 (aged 71); Dromana, Victoria
- Original team: Camberwell

Playing career^{1}
Years	Club	Games (Goals)
1915	Richmond	4 (0)
- ^{1} Playing statistics correct to the end of 1915.

William Ernest Amery (16 September 1894 – 2 May 1966) was an Australian rules footballer who played with Richmond in the Victorian Football League (VFL).
