= Cecil Phipps =

English footballer

Personal information
- Full name: Cecil Harry Phipps
- Date of birth: 25 October 1896
- Place of birth: Leicester, England
- Date of death: 1968 (aged 71–72)
- Position: Inside forward

Senior career*
| Years | Team | Apps | (Gls) |
| 1919–1920 | West Ham United | 1 | (0) |
| 1920–1921 | Coalville Swifts | | |
| 1921–1922 | Halifax Town | 5 | (0) |
| 1922–1923 | Coalville Swifts | | |
| 1924 | Loughborough Corinthians | | |
| 1925 | Whitwick Imperial | | |
| 1926 | Burton All Saints | | |
| 1927 | Shepshed Albion | | |
| 1928 | Holy Trinity Pilots | | |
| 1929 | Municipal Offices | | |
| Total | | 6 | (0) |
- * Club domestic league appearances and goals

Cecil Harry Phipps (25 October 1896 – 1968) was an English footballer who played in the Football League for Halifax Town and West Ham United.
