= Jack Curnow =

English footballer

Personal information
- Date of birth: 31 January 1910
- Place of birth: Lingdale, Yorkshire, England
- Date of death: 1990 (ages 79-80)
- Position: Goalkeeper

Senior career*
| Years | Team | Apps | (Gls) |
| 1935–1936 | Wolverhampton Wanderers | 6 | (0) |
| 1936–1937 | Blackpool | 0 | (0) |
| 1937–1939 | Tranmere Rovers | 52 | (0) |
| 1939 | Hull City | 2 | (0) |
| 1945–1946 | Tranmere Rovers | 0 | (0) |
- * Club domestic league appearances and goals

Jack L. Curnow (31 January 1910 – 1990) was an English professional footballer. A goalkeeper, he played in the Football League for Wolves, Tranmere Rovers and Hull City.
