= Archie Ratcliffe =

English footballer

Personal information
- Full name: Milton Archie Ratcliffe
- Date of birth: 30 January 1893
- Place of birth: Blackburn, England
- Date of death: 1981 (aged 87–88)
- Position: Centre forward

Senior career*
Years	Team	Apps	(Gls)
1919–1920	Nelson		
1920–1921	Blackpool	13	(2)
1921–1922	The Wednesday	12	(4)
1922–1923	Tranmere Rovers	2	(0)
Total		27	(6)
- * Club domestic league appearances and goals

Milton Archie Ratcliffe (30 January 1893 – 1981) was an English footballer who played in the Football League for Blackpool, The Wednesday and Tranmere Rovers.
