= Bob Fenwick =

English footballer

Personal information
- Full name: Robert William Fenwick
- Date of birth: 29 September 1894
- Place of birth: Walker, England
- Date of death: 1973 (aged 78–79)
- Height: 5 ft 11 in (1.80 m)
- Position: Centre half

Senior career*
Years	Team	Apps	(Gls)
–	Ashington		
1920–1923	Lincoln City	87	(5)
1923–1924	Notts County	6	(0)
1924–1926	Lincoln City	27	(0)
–	Shirebrook		
–	Newark Town		
–	Horncastle Town		
–	Shildon		
- * Club domestic league appearances and goals

Robert William Fenwick (29 September 1894 – 1973) was an English professional footballer who made 82 appearances in the Football League playing for Lincoln City and Notts County. He played as a centre half.

== Life and career ==
Fenwick was born in Walker, Newcastle upon Tyne, in 1894. He played football for Ashington before signing for Lincoln City, for whom he made his first-team debut in the Midland League in August 1920. He was ever-present that season, as Lincoln won the Midland League title and were elected to the Third Division North of the Football League. In the latter part of the 1922–23 season, Fenwick joined Second Division Notts County, playing three times as the club were promoted to the First Division as champions. He was unable to establish himself in the first team, and played only three times in the top flight before returning to Lincoln during the 1924–25 season. He made another 27 league appearances, then moved into non-league football successively with Shirebrook, Newark Town, Horncastle Town and Shildon. He died in 1973.
