= Wilf Yates =

English footballer (1897–1981)

Personal information
- Full name: Wilfred James Yates
- Date of birth: 5 November 1897
- Place of birth: Southport, England
- Date of death: 1981 (aged 83–84)
- Position: Full-back

Senior career*
Years	Team	Apps	(Gls)
1920–1921	Southport		
1921–1925	Preston North End	63	(0)
1925–1926	Crewe Alexandra	36	(0)
1926–1929	Tranmere Rovers	92	(0)
1929–1930	Mansfield Town		
1930–1931	Preston North End	0	(0)
Total		191	(0)
- * Club domestic league appearances and goals

Wilfred James Yates (5 November 1897 – 1981) was an English footballer who played in the Football League for Crewe Alexandra, Preston North End and Tranmere Rovers.
