= Tom Heslop =

English footballer

Personal information
- Place of birth: England
- Height: 5 ft 10 1/2 in (1.79 m)
- Positions: Inside forward; wing half

Senior career*
Years	Team	Apps	(Gls)
19??–1912	Darlington		(15)
1912–1913	Blackpool	29	(6)
1913–1915	Bolton Wanderers	7	(0)
1919–1921	Accrington Stanley		
1921–1922	Tranmere Rovers	8	(0)
- * Club domestic league appearances and goals

Thomas W. Heslop was an English professional footballer who played either as an inside forward or wing half. He assisted three different Football League clubs, making a total of 44 appearances.

Heslop played for Darlington, scoring 13 North-Eastern League goals in the 1910–11 and 1911–12 seasons, before moving into the Football League with Blackpool in 1912, for whom he scored 6 goals in 29 league matches. In 1913 Heslop joined Bolton Wanderers and made seven league appearances for the club, but his time at Bolton was curtailed by the First World War. When competitive football recommenced in England, he signed with Lancashire Combination side Accrington Stanley. Heslop transferred to Tranmere Rovers in 1921 and played eight matches during the club's first season in the Football League.

During the First World War, Heslop played 29 matches as a wartime guest with Burnley.
