= Jack Woods (footballer) =

English footballer

Personal information
- Full name: John Woods
- Date of birth: q4 1896
- Place of birth: St Helens, Lancashire, England
- Date of death: 1969
- Place of death: Rainhill, Merseyside.
- Position: Centre forward

Senior career*
| Years | Team | Apps | (Gls) |
| –1921 | Stalybridge Celtic | | |
| 1921–1922 | Halifax Town | 21 | (12) |
| 1922–1923 | York City | 32 | (13) |
| Total | | 53 | (25) |
- * Club domestic league appearances and goals

John "Jack" Woods (q4 1896 – 1969) was an English professional footballer who played as a centre forward in the Football League for Halifax Town and in non-League football for Stalybridge Celtic and York City.

Jack's sister Alice was an elite sprinter and played football for Dick, Kerr Ladies. While playing for Halifax Town he helped to coach the St Helens Ladies team which gave Alice and Lily Parr their first experiences of organised football.
