= Trimdon Grange =

Village in County Durham, England

Coordinates: 54.715276°N 1.427193°W

- Location within County Durham
- OS grid reference: NZ369342
- Civil parish: Trimdon
- Unitary authority: County Durham
- Ceremonial county: Durham
- Region: North East
- Country: England
- Sovereign state: United Kingdom
- Post town: TRIMDON STATION
- Postcode district: TS29
- Dialling code: 01429
- Police: Durham
- Fire: County Durham and Darlington
- Ambulance: North East
- UK Parliament: Sedgefield

Trimdon Grange is a village in County Durham, in England. It is situated ten miles to the west of Hartlepool, and a short distance to the north of Trimdon.

== Colliery disaster ==
At 14:40 on 16 February 1882 the Trimdon Grange colliery suffered a major explosion causing the deaths of 69 men and boys. The coroner (TW Snagge) reported to both houses of Parliament:

- The mine was a dusty mine and watering should have been daily but it was done "not in all places, but where it was absolutely necessary."
- The mine was not "more than ordinarily gassy", but there is some evidence that the identified points of leakage might have been points of accumulation from leaks elsewhere.
- The lamps in use were Davy pattern and naked lights called "midgies" in some areas. The coroner found no evidence that the midgies were connected with the explosion.
- Good order and discipline prevailed in Trimdon Grange Colliery.
- The air pressure had been exceptionally low, the lowest it had been that month, falling to 29.10 inches of mercury (985 mbar) on the morning of the explosion.
- The roof above the workings in the narrow pit district had been observed to be dangerous.

The inquest concluded:

There is no room for doubt that the explosion had its origin in the Pit Narrow Board District, and that it was caused by the diffusion of a sudden "squeeze" or outburst of gas forced, with accompanying dust, towards the working face by a heavy fall of roof over the northern edge of the Pit Narrow Board goaf, and driven out with a velocity which sent the flame through a miner's lamp.

The coroner further observed:

the result of this inquiry is a further proof, if further proof were needed, that the Davy lamp affords no security whatever against the occurrence of grave disasters of a similar kind, and that its employment in dusty mines during long-wall working operations, carried on under conditions of ventilation and roof formation similar to those prevailing in Trimdon Grange Colliery, ought to be absolutely prohibited.

Not all the men were killed by the explosion and fire. After the explosion the burnt methane (firedamp) forms carbon dioxide (then called carbonic acid gas) and carbon monoxide. The resulting mixture is called afterdamp and will suffocate and kill. Indeed, the gas forced its way through a passage into the adjoining Kelloe Pit where six men lost their lives from the afterdamp.

=== "Trimdon Grange Explosion" (1882 song) ===
The incident was recounted in the song "Trimdon Grange Explosion" by the local collier-bard Tommy Armstrong. Armstrong performed the song within a few days of the disaster in the local Mechanics' Hall. He set it to the tune of the parlour-song Go and Leave Me If You Wish It. The version of the first verse below was collected in 1951 in Newcastle.

The lyrics of the song include an accounting of the events that took place, such as:

Men and boys left home that morning
For to earn their daily bread
Little thought before the evening
They'd be numbered with the dead

The song also asks the local community to help out in the wake of the incident:

God protect the lonely widow
Help to raise each drooping head
Be a Father to the orphans
Never let them cry for bread

The song became known outside of Trimdon Grange and has been recorded by other artists, including Martin Carthy, The Mekons and Alan Price.

== Trimdon Grange Wind Farm ==
There is a small (5.2 MW) wind farm near the village. Controversy arose in 2004 when the agent of the then prime minister, Tony Blair, claimed the location was unsuitable.

== Notable people ==
- George Bradshaw, professional footballer
- Albert Brallisford, professional footballer who played for several clubs, including Trimdon Grange Colliery between 1930 and 1934.
- Peter Lee (trade unionist), (1864–1935). Miner's leader, early Labour county councillor and Methodist local preacher, born in Trimdon Grange.
