= Les Amery =

Australian rules footballer (1934–1999)

Personal information
- Full name: Leslie Francis Amery
- Born: 17 December 1934
- Died: 19 April 1999 (aged 64)
- Original team: Melton / Richmond Districts
- Height: 170 cm (5 ft 7 in)
- Weight: 81 kg (179 lb)

Playing career^{1}
Years	Club	Games (Goals)
1956	Richmond	4 (2)
1957–58	Camberwell (VFA)	18 (10)
1962–63	Norwood (SANFL)	39 (72)
- ^{1} Playing statistics correct to the end of 1963.

Leslie Francis Amery (17 December 1934 – 19 April 1999) was an Australian rules footballer who played with Richmond in the Victorian Football League (VFL) and later Norwood in the South Australian National Football League (SANFL).
