= Bob Suter (English footballer) =

English footballer (1880–1945)

Personal information
- Full name: Ernest Robert Suter
- Date of birth: 10 July 1880
- Place of birth: Epperstone, England
- Date of death: 1945 (aged 64–65)
- Position: Goalkeeper

Senior career*
Years	Team	Apps	(Gls)
1896–1897	Southwell Church Lads Brigade		
1897–1898	Southwell St Mary's		
1898	Nottingham Park		
1898–1902	Notts County	38	(0)
1903	Alnoea		
1903–1906	Newark		
1906–1907	Notts County	4	(0)
1912	Goole Town		
1912–1928	Halifax Town	4	(0)
Total		46	(0)
- * Club domestic league appearances and goals

Ernest Robert Suter (10 July 1880 – 1945) was an English footballer who played in the Football League for Halifax Town and Notts County. Suter had a twenty-year association with Halifax Town where he had roles as player, trainer, coach, groundsman and general handyman.
