= Bob Chambers (footballer) =

English footballer (1899–1973)

Personal information
- Full name: Robert Chambers
- Date of birth: 11 December 1899
- Place of birth: Newcastle-upon-Tyne, England
- Date of death: July–September 1972 (aged 71)
- Height: 5 ft 11 1/4 in (1.81 m)
- Position: Centre half

Senior career*
Years	Team	Apps	(Gls)
1921–1922	Lincoln City	23	(12)
1922–1923	Burnley	4	(0)
1923–1926	Rotherham United	100	(6)
1926–1927	Carlisle United	?	(?)
1927–1928	Exeter City	1	(0)
1928–1929	New Brighton	1	(0)
- * Club domestic league appearances and goals

Robert Chambers (11 December 1899 – 1972) was an English professional association footballer. He played for five clubs in the Football League in the 1920s, as well as playing non-league football with Carlisle United.
