= Peter Fairclough (footballer) =

English footballer

Personal information
- Full name: Peter Fairclough
- Date of birth: 1893
- Place of birth: St Helens, England
- Date of death: 1963 (aged 69–70)
- Height: 5 ft 8 in (1.73 m)
- Positions: Left half; centre forward

Senior career*
| Years | Team | Apps | (Gls) |
- Cammell Laird Institute
- St Helens Town
| –1913 | Eccles Borough | | |
| 1913–1920 | Manchester City | 5 | (0) |
| 1921–1922 | Tranmere Rovers | 8 | (0) |
- * Club domestic league appearances and goals

Peter Fairclough (1893–1963) was an English professional footballer who played as a left half in the Football League for Tranmere Rovers and Manchester City.

== Personal life ==
Fairclough was the younger brother of footballer Albert Fairclough. He served in the First World War in the Footballers' Battalion of the Middlesex Regiment.

== Career statistics ==
Appearances and goals by club, season and competition
| Club | Season | League | | | FA Cup | | Total | |
| Club | Season | Division | Apps | Goals | Apps | Goals | Apps | Goals |
|---|---|---|---|---|---|---|---|---|
| Manchester City | 1914–15 | First Division | 1 | 0 | 0 | 0 | 1 | 0 |
| Manchester City | 1919–20 | First Division | 4 | 0 | 0 | 0 | 4 | 0 |
| Manchester City | Total | | 5 | 0 | 0 | 0 | 5 | 0 |
| Tranmere Rovers | 1921–22 | Third Division North | 8 | 0 | 0 | 0 | 8 | 0 |
| Career total | | | 13 | 0 | 0 | 0 | 13 | 0 |
