= Ernie Davies =

English footballer

Personal information
- Full name: Ernest Davies
- Date of birth: 31 January 1916
- Place of birth: Heswall, England
- Date of death: 17 August 1942 (aged 26)
- Place of death: SS Princess Marguerite, Mediterranean Sea
- Position: Wing half

Senior career*
Years	Team	Apps	(Gls)
1935	Heswall		
1936–1940	Tranmere Rovers	48	(1)
1939–1940	York City	0	(0)
- * Club domestic league appearances and goals

Ernest Davies (31 January 1916 – 17 August 1942) was an English professional footballer who played as a wing half in the Football League for Tranmere Rovers.

== Personal life ==
Davies served as a corporal in the 1st Battalion, King's Own Royal Regiment (Lancaster) during the Second World War. He enlisted in 1940 and was deployed overseas c. December 1941. Davies was killed aboard the troopship SS Princess Marguerite when it was sunk en route to Cyprus by U-83 on 17 August 1942. His body was never recovered, and he is commemorated on the Alamein Memorial.

== Career statistics ==
Appearances and goals by club, season and competition
Club	Season	Division	League		FA Cup		Total	
Club	Season	Division	Apps	Goals	Apps	Goals	Apps	Goals
Tranmere Rovers	1936–37	Third Division North	20	1	0	0	20	1
Tranmere Rovers	1937–38	Third Division North	5	0	0	0	5	0
Tranmere Rovers	1938–39	Second Division	22	0	1	0	23	0
Tranmere Rovers	1939–40	Third Division North	3	1	0	0	3	1
Career total			50	2	1	0	51	2
