= Jabez Evans =

Welsh footballer

Personal information
- Full name: Jabez Evans
- Date of birth: 29 April 1895
- Place of birth: Buckley, Flintshire, Wales
- Date of death: 1966 (aged 70–71)
- Position: Outside left

Senior career*
Years	Team	Apps	(Gls)
- Buckley United
1920–1921	Wrexham	7	(0)
1921–1922	Buckley United		
1922–1925	Tranmere Rovers	48	(5)
- Mold Town
- * Club domestic league appearances and goals

Jabez Evans (29 April 1895 – 1966) was a Welsh professional footballer who played as an outside left. He made appearances in the English Football League for Tranmere Rovers. He also played for Welsh clubs Buckley United, Wrexham and Mold Town.
