= George Bradshaw (footballer) =

English footballer

Personal information
- Date of birth: 12 March 1904
- Place of birth: Trimdon Grange, England
- Position: Full back

Senior career*
Years	Team	Apps	(Gls)
- Chilton Colliery Recreation Athletic
1924–1926	Blackpool	43	(0)
1927–1933	Bury	140	(1)
1935	Tranmere Rovers	5	(0)
- * Club domestic league appearances and goals

George Bradshaw (12 March 1904 – after 1934) was an English professional footballer. He played for Blackpool, Bury and Tranmere Rovers.

== Career ==
Trimdon Grange-born Bradshaw began his career with Blackpool in 1924. In two years with the Seasiders he made 43 Football League appearances. In 1927 he joined Bury, with whom he spent the majority of his career. He made 140 League appearances for the Shakers, scoring the only League goal of his career. In 1935 he signed for Tranmere Rovers. It was with the Wirral club that he finished his career.
