= Amery, Wisconsin =

- City
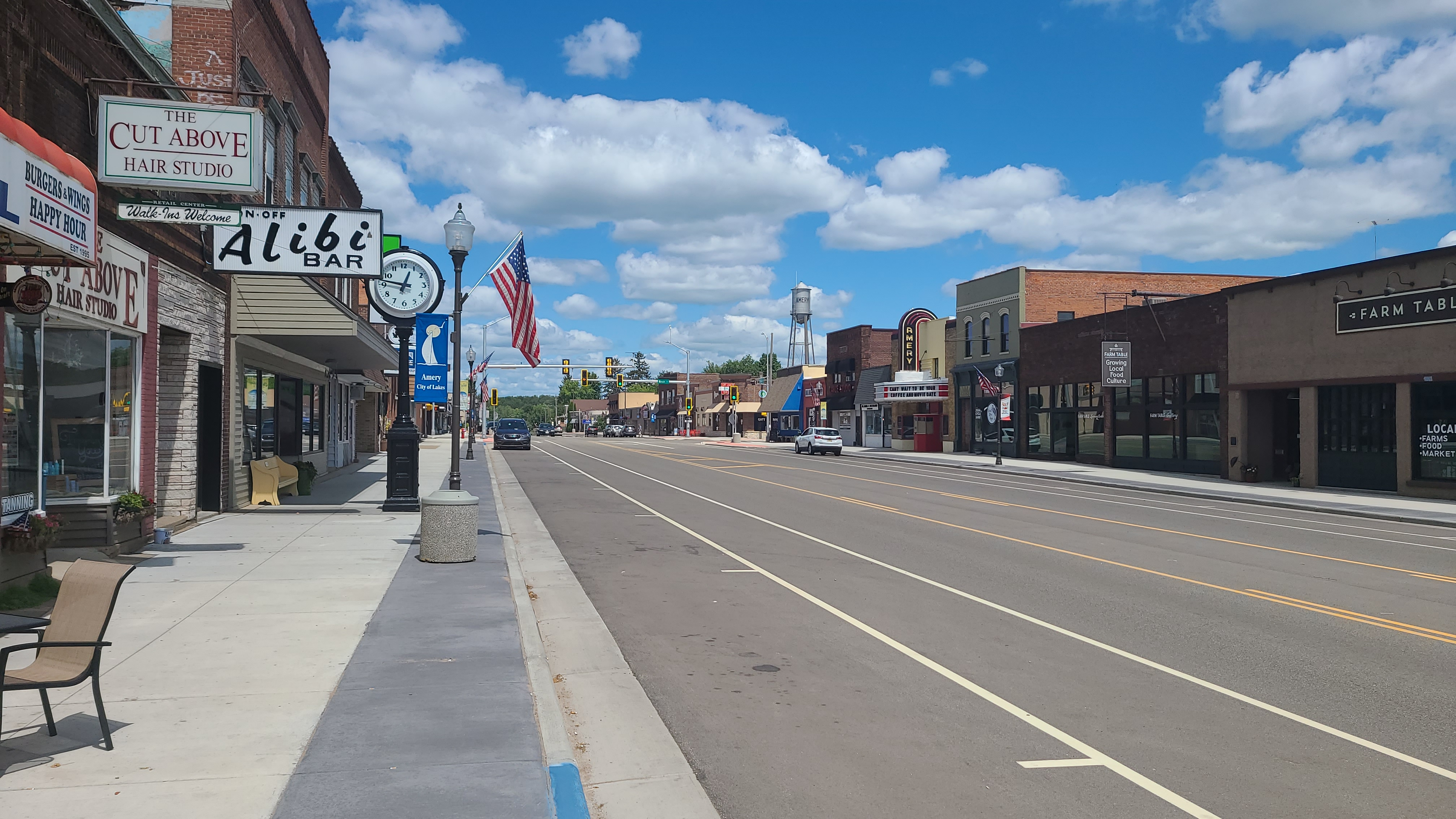
- Downtown Amery

- Location within Polk County and Wisconsin

- Location within Wisconsin Location within the United States
- Coordinates: 45°18′35″N 92°21′46″W
- Country: United States
- State: Wisconsin
- County: Polk

Area
  - Total: 3.84 sq mi (9.94 km^{2})
  - Land: 3.10 sq mi (8.02 km^{2})
  - Water: 0.74 sq mi (1.92 km^{2})
- Elevation: 1,070 ft (326 m)

Population (2020)
  - Total: 2,962
  - Density: 907.9/sq mi (350.54/km^{2})
- Time zone: UTC-6 (Central (CST))
  - Summer (DST): UTC-5 (CDT)
- Area codes: 715 & 534
- FIPS code: 55-01725
- GNIS feature ID: 1560828
- Website: http://www.amerywisconsin.org

Amery (/ˈeɪməri/ AY-mər-ee) is a city in Polk County, Wisconsin, United States, along the Apple River. It is a part of Wisconsin's 7th congressional district. The population was 2,962 at the 2020 census. The city was named in honor of William Amery, a carpenter who held several local offices in the 1870s.

== Geography ==
Amery is located at 45°18′35″N 92°21′46″W (45.309747, -92.362782).

According to the United States Census Bureau, the city has a total area of 3.61 square miles (9.35 km^{2}), of which 2.96 square miles (7.67 km^{2}) is land and 0.65 square miles (1.68 km^{2}) is water.

Wisconsin Highway 46 and Polk County Road F are the main routes in the community.

=== Climate ===
Climate data for Amery, Wisconsin (1991–2020 normals, extremes 1922–present)
Month	Jan	Feb	Mar	Apr	May	Jun	Jul	Aug	Sep	Oct	Nov	Dec	Year
Record high °F (°C)	54 (12)	60 (16)	80 (27)	90 (32)	104 (40)	102 (39)	108 (42)	101 (38)	103 (39)	89 (32)	76 (24)	61 (16)	108 (42)
Mean daily maximum °F (°C)	21.5 (−5.8)	26.9 (−2.8)	39.5 (4.2)	53.9 (12.2)	67.1 (19.5)	76.4 (24.7)	80.7 (27.1)	78.7 (25.9)	70.7 (21.5)	56.4 (13.6)	40.2 (4.6)	26.9 (−2.8)	53.2 (11.8)
Daily mean °F (°C)	12.7 (−10.7)	17.2 (−8.2)	29.8 (−1.2)	43.4 (6.3)	56.3 (13.5)	65.9 (18.8)	70.4 (21.3)	68.3 (20.2)	60.2 (15.7)	46.3 (7.9)	32.2 (0.1)	19.3 (−7.1)	43.5 (6.4)
Mean daily minimum °F (°C)	3.9 (−15.6)	7.4 (−13.7)	20.1 (−6.6)	32.9 (0.5)	45.6 (7.6)	55.4 (13.0)	60.1 (15.6)	57.8 (14.3)	49.6 (9.8)	36.3 (2.4)	24.2 (−4.3)	11.6 (−11.3)	33.7 (0.9)
Record low °F (°C)	−46 (−43)	−46 (−43)	−40 (−40)	−10 (−23)	18 (−8)	29 (−2)	31 (−1)	31 (−1)	22 (−6)	8 (−13)	−22 (−30)	−43 (−42)	−46 (−43)
Average precipitation inches (mm)	1.07 (27)	1.14 (29)	1.73 (44)	3.04 (77)	3.86 (98)	4.80 (122)	4.62 (117)	4.16 (106)	3.68 (93)	3.06 (78)	1.88 (48)	1.50 (38)	34.54 (877)
Average precipitation days (≥ 0.01 in)	7.5	6.2	7.7	10.0	12.4	13.0	11.2	10.4	10.3	10.5	7.4	8.8	115.4
Source: NOAA

== Demographics ==
Historical population
Census	Pop.	Note	%±
1890	451		—
1900	905		100.7%
1910	659		−27.2%
1920	1,203		82.5%
1930	1,354		12.6%
1940	1,461		7.9%
1950	1,625		11.2%
1960	1,769		8.9%
1970	2,126		20.2%
1980	2,404		13.1%
1990	2,657		10.5%
2000	2,845		7.1%
2010	2,902		2.0%
2020	2,962		2.1%
U.S. Decennial Census

=== 2010 census ===
As of the census of 2010, there were 2,902 people, 1,286 households, and 705 families living in the city. The population density was 980.4 inhabitants per square mile (378.5/km^{2}). There were 1,445 housing units at an average density of 488.2 per square mile (188.5/km^{2}). The racial makeup of the city was 97.3% White, 0.1% African American, 0.8% Native American, 0.3% Asian, 0.1% Pacific Islander, 0.4% from other races, and 0.9% from two or more races. Hispanic or Latino of any race were 2.2% of the population.

There were 1,286 households, of which 26.4% had children under the age of 18 living with them, 39.4% were married couples living together, 10.5% had a female householder with no husband present, 4.9% had a male householder with no wife present, and 45.2% were non-families. 41.1% of all households were made up of individuals, and 25.2% had someone living alone who was 65 years of age or older. The average household size was 2.14 and the average family size was 2.89.

The median age in the city was 45.1 years. 22.9% of residents were under the age of 18; 5.7% were between the ages of 18 and 24; 21.3% were from 25 to 44; 22.6% were from 45 to 64; and 27.6% were 65 years of age or older. The gender makeup of the city was 44.6% male and 55.4% female.

=== 2000 census ===
As of the census of 2000, there were 2,845 people, 1,231 households, and 725 families living in the city. The population density was 947.2 people per square mile (366.2/km^{2}). There were 1,311 housing units at an average density of 436.5 per square mile (168.7/km^{2}). The racial makeup of the city was 97.96% White, 0.07% African American, 0.70% Native American, 0.25% Asian, 0.18% Pacific Islander, 0.32% from other races, and 0.53% from two or more races. Hispanic or Latino of any race were 0.95% of the population.

There were 1,231 households, out of which 25.7% had children under the age of 18 living with them, 47.0% were married couples living together, 9.0% had a female householder with no husband present, and 41.1% were non-families. 36.6% of all households were made up of individuals, and 21.1% had someone living alone who was 65 years of age or older. The average household size was 2.17 and the average family size was 2.83.

In the city, the population was spread out, with 22.1% under the age of 18, 6.7% from 18 to 24, 21.6% from 25 to 44, 21.9% from 45 to 64, and 27.6% who were 65 years of age or older. The median age was 45 years. For every 100 females, there were 77.4 males. For every 100 females age 18 and over, there were 72.5 males.

The median income for a household in the city was $30,710, and the median income for a family was $40,568. Males had a median income of $31,636 versus $20,795 for females. The per capita income for the city was $17,125. About 4.0% of families and 8.5% of the population were below the poverty line, including 10.6% of those under age 18 and 10.1% of those age 65 or over.

== Education ==
Amery is served by the Amery School District. In the city of Amery, there is a public school called Amery High School, which serves students from ninth to twelfth grade.

== Transportation ==
The Amery Municipal Airport (KAHH) is located near Amery.

== In popular culture ==
The film Clear Lake, WI starring Michael Madsen was partially filmed in Amery.

== Notable people ==
- Jerry M. Anderson, educator
- Ed Barney, MLB player
- Dougald D. Kennedy, Wisconsin State Representative
- Annie Lobert, anti-human trafficking activist and missionary to the sex industry
- Ethan B. Minier, Wisconsin State Representative and lawyer
- Alicia Monson, Olympic long-distance runner
- William Nordeen, United States diplomat
- Harvey Stower, Wisconsin State Representative and former Mayor of Amery
- Dwight York, stand-up comedian

== Images ==
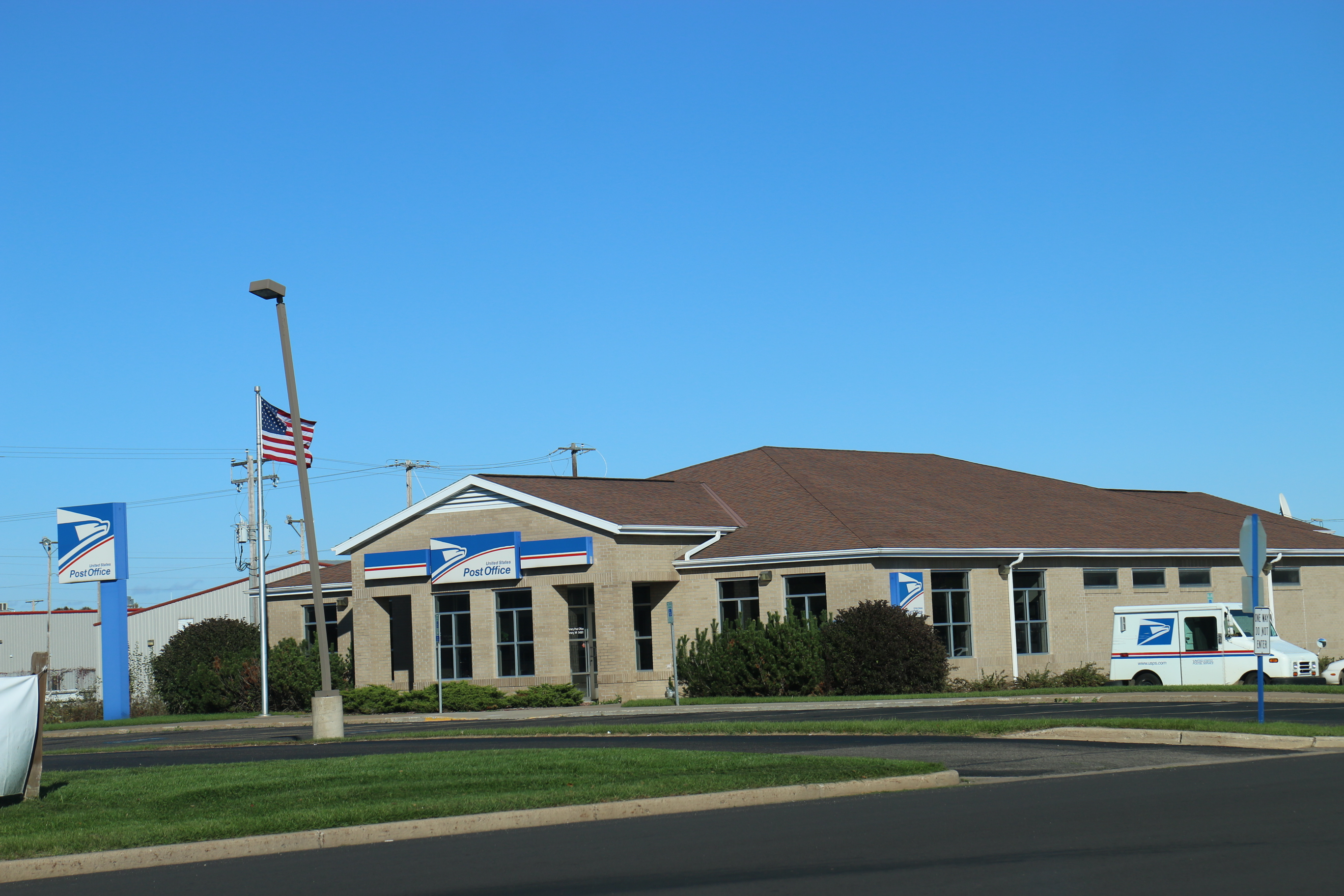
Post office

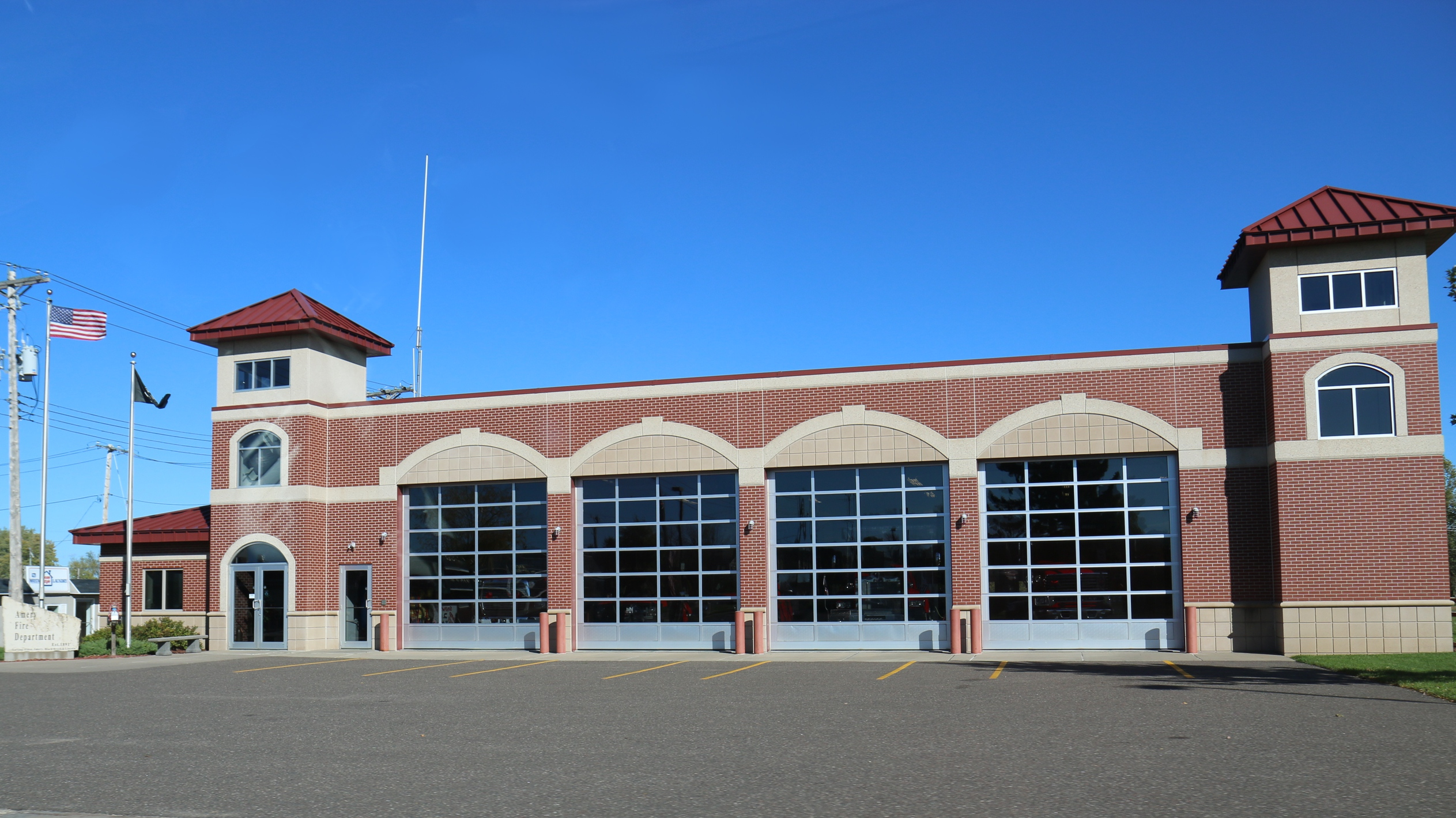
Fire department

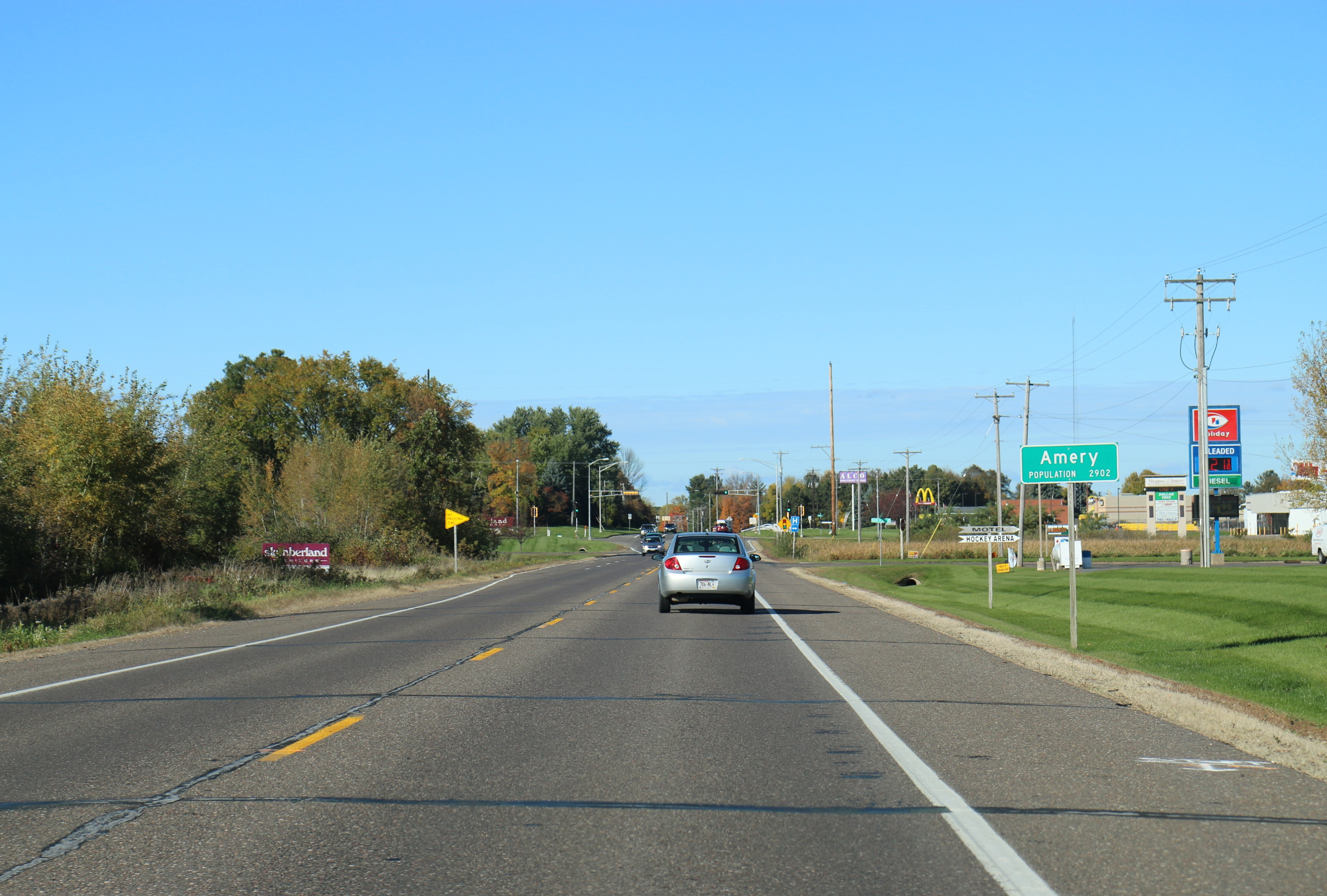
Sign on WIS46

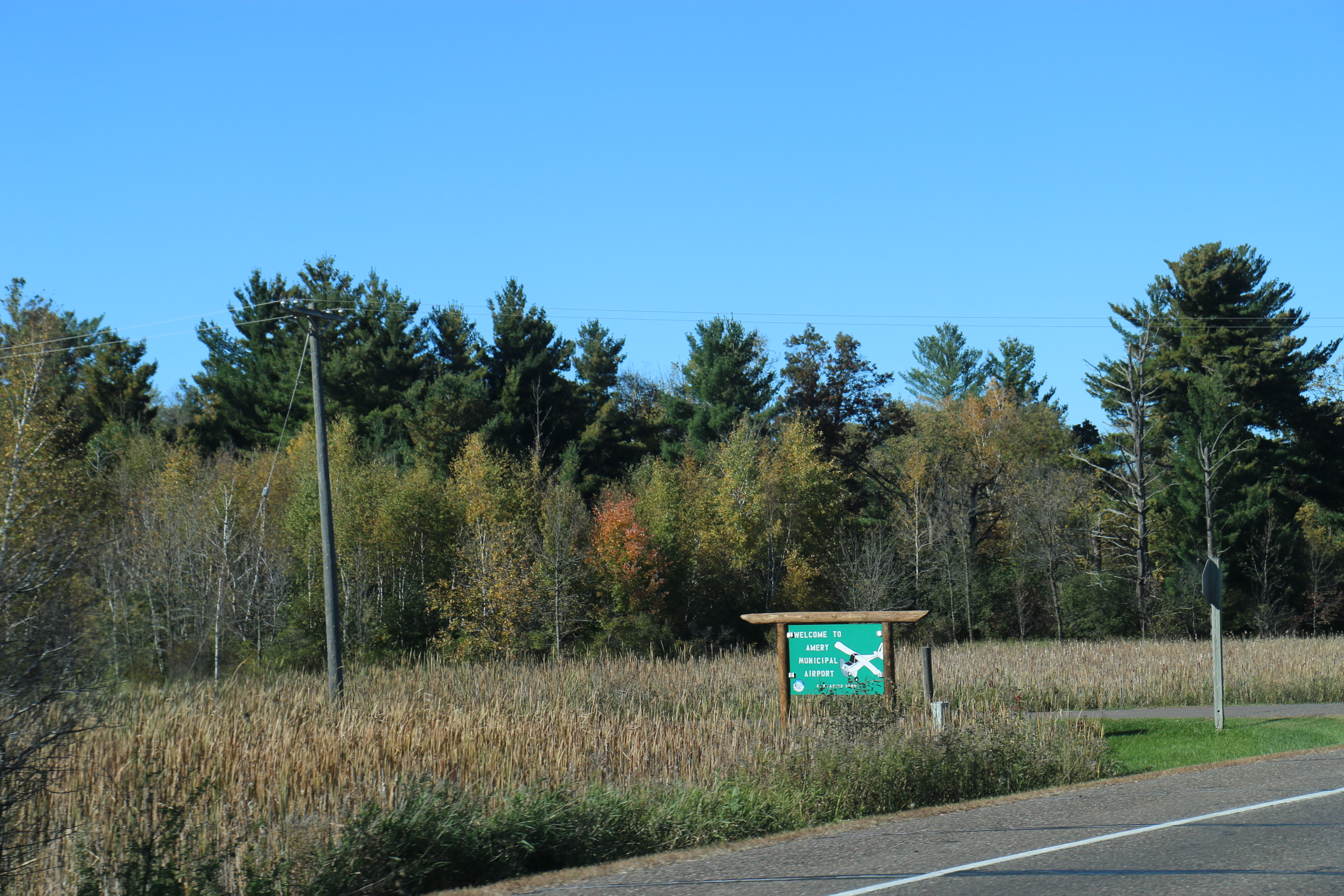
Amery Municipal Airport

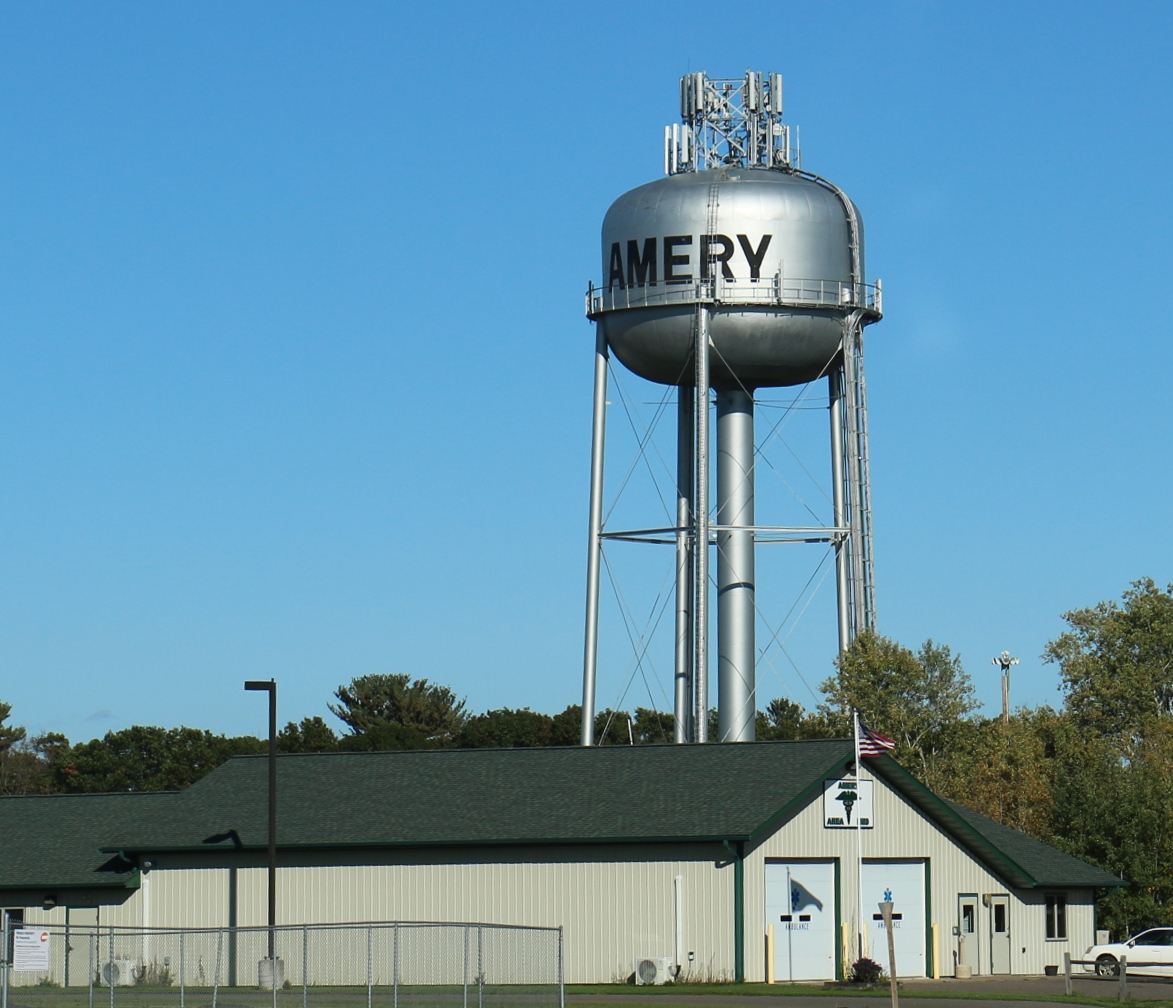
Water tower

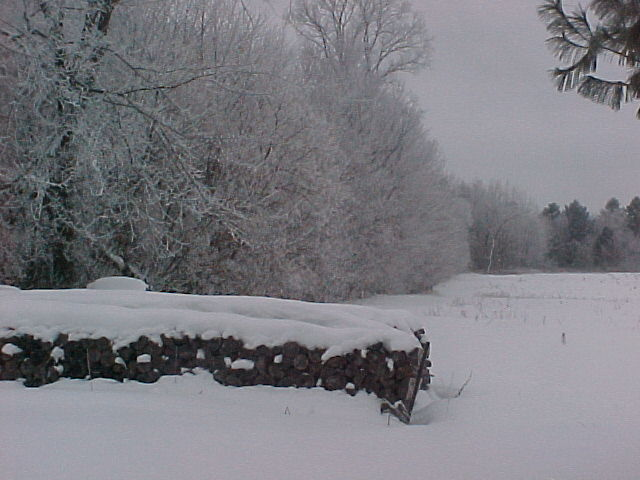
near Amery on a winter morning
