= Stan Rowlands =

Welsh footballer

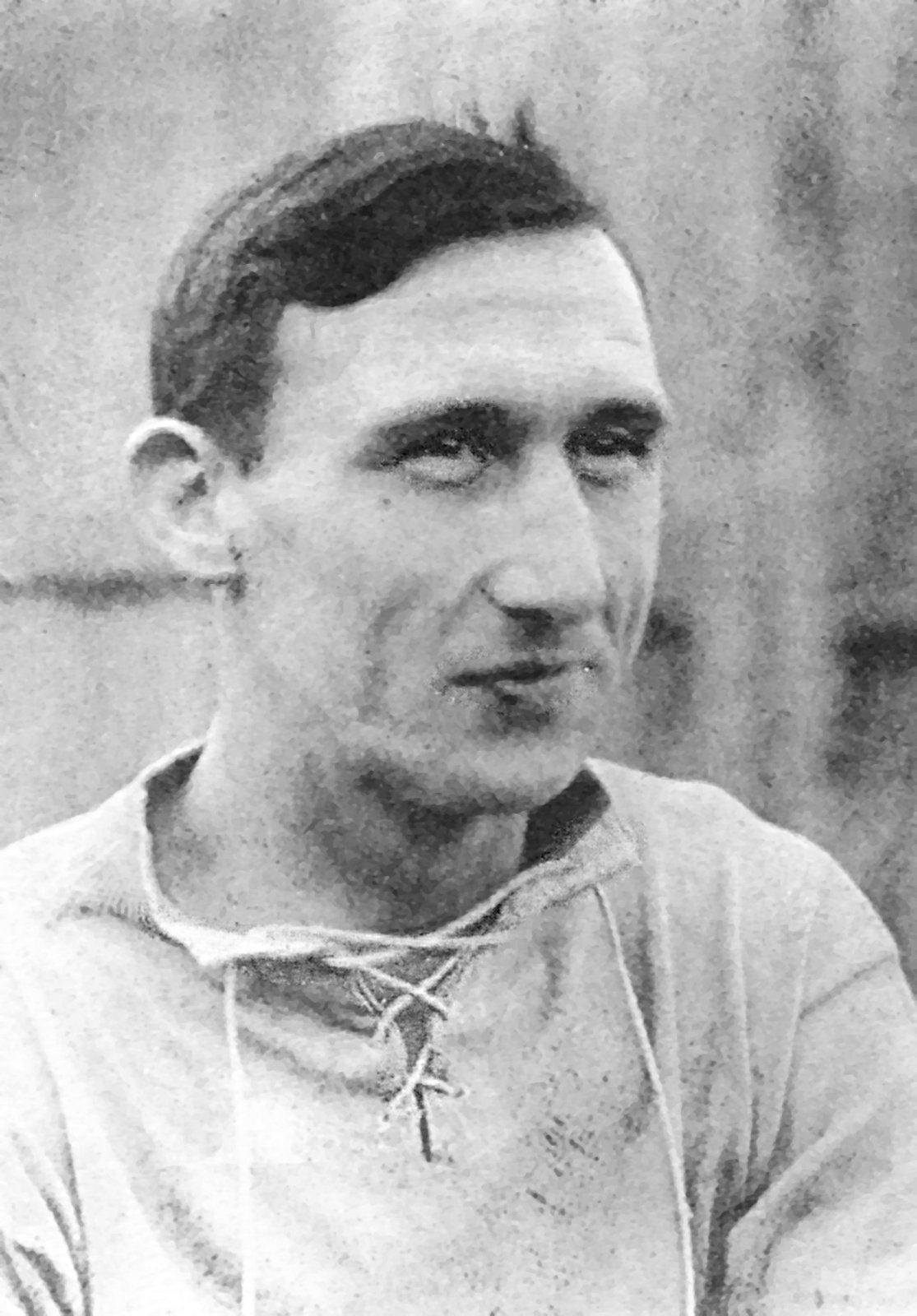
- Rowlands in 1913

Personal information
- Full name: Alfred Stanley Rowlands
- Date of birth: 12 November 1889
- Place of birth: Coedway, Powys, Wales

Senior career*
| Years | Team | Apps | (Gls) |
| 1907–1908 | Welshpool Town | | |
| 1908–1909 | Wellington Town | | |
| 1909–1910 | Birkenhead North End | | |
| 1910 | Wrexham | | |
| 1910–1911 | South Liverpool | | |
| 1911 | Nottingham Forest | 1 | (0) |
| 1911–1912 | South Liverpool | | |
| 1912–1913 | Wrexham | | |
| 1913–1920 | Tranmere Rovers | | |
| 1920–1921 | Reading | 0 | (0) |
| 1921–1922 | Crewe Alexandra | 26 | (8) |
| 1922–1923 | Wrexham | 9 | (0) |
| 1923–1924 | Oswestry Town | | |
| 1924–1926 | South Molton | | |
| 1926–1928 | Bideford | | |
| 1928–1930 | Ilfracombe Town | | |
| 1930–1931 | Barum Town | | |
| 1931 | Barnstaple Town | | |

International career
| 1914 | Wales | 1 | (0) |
- * Club domestic league appearances and goals

Alfred Stanley Rowlands (born 12 November 1889) was a Welsh footballer. He was a forward for Tranmere Rovers and scored 32 goals for Tranmere during the 1913–14 season, helping them to with the Lancashire Combination. In the same season, on 16 March 1914, Rowlands represented Wales in their 2–0 defeat to England; this was the first time a Tranmere player had played for their national team.

He also represented Wrexham, Nottingham Forest and Crewe Alexandra in the Football League.
