= Charlie Amery =

English footballer

Personal information
- Full name: Charles Siddall Amery
- Date of birth: 16 September 1910
- Place of birth: Wallasey, England
- Date of death: 1979
- Place of death: Liverpool, England
- Height: 5 ft 10 1/2 in (1.79 m)
- Position: Left back

Senior career*
Years	Team	Apps	(Gls)
- New Brighton
1935–1938	Tranmere Rovers	47	(0)
1938	Stockport County	1	(0)
- * Club domestic league appearances and goals

Charles Siddall Amery (16 September 1910 – 1979) was an English footballer who played as a left back. He moved from New Brighton to Tranmere Rovers in 1935, making 47 appearances for Rovers. Amery subsequently made one appearance in the Football League for Stockport County. He also played for Blackpool during his career.
