= Charlie Cunningham (footballer) =

English footballer (1890–1942)

Personal information
- Date of birth: 1890
- Place of birth: Manchester, England
- Date of death: January 1942 (aged 51–52)
- Place of death: Atherton, England
- Position: Inside left

Senior career*
Years	Team	Apps	(Gls)
- Stockport County
–1922	Tranmere Rovers	32	(6)
1922–	Ashton National		
- * Club domestic league appearances and goals

Charlie Cunningham (1890 – 30 January 1942) was an English footballer who played as an inside left for Stockport County, Tranmere Rovers and Ashton National.
