= George Wild (footballer) =

English footballer

Personal information
- Date of birth: 1887
- Height: 5 ft 7 in (1.70 m)
- Position: Inside right

Senior career*
Years	Team	Apps	(Gls)
- Sowerby Bridge Institute
- Halifax Town
1913–1914	Bradford City	2	(1)
- * Club domestic league appearances and goals

George Wild (born 1887) was an English professional footballer who played as an inside right.

== Career ==
Wild spent his early career with Sowerby Bridge Institute and Halifax Town. He signed for Bradford City from Halifax Town in December 1913. He made 2 league appearances for the club, before being released in 1914.

== Sources ==
- Frost, Terry (1988). Bradford City A Complete Record 1903-1988. Breedon Books Sport. ISBN 0-907969-38-0.
