= Denis Bullough =

English footballer

Personal information
- Full name: Denis Reginald Bullough
- Date of birth: 29 November 1895
- Place of birth: Wombwell, Yorkshire, England
- Date of death: 3 April 1975 (aged 79)
- Place of death: Merseyside, England
- Position: Centre forward

Senior career*
Years	Team	Apps	(Gls)
1919–1921	Stockport County		
1921–1922	Tranmere Rovers	9	(5)
1922–	Southport		
- * Club domestic league appearances and goals

Denis Reginald Bullough (29 November 1895 – 3 April 1975) was an English footballer. He was a centre forward at Stockport County from 1919, before moving to Tranmere Rovers in 1921. He was the joint top-scorer for Tranmere in the 1921–22 season – their first in The Football League – netting seven league and cup goals. In 1922 he moved to Southport.
