= Jimmy Carney =

English footballer

Personal information
- Full name: James Michael Carney
- Date of birth: 4 December 1891
- Date of death: 1980 (aged 88–89)
- Height: 5 ft 7 in (1.70 m)
- Position: Wing half

Senior career*
Years	Team	Apps	(Gls)
1908	Bolton Wanderers	0	(0)
1909	Blackpool	0	(0)
1910–1914	Glossop North End	138	(6)
1919	Bolton Wanderers	0	(0)
1921–1922	Stalybridge Celtic	72	(14)
1923–1926	Newport County	118	(13)
- * Club domestic league appearances and goals

James Michael Carney (4 December 1891 – 1980) was an English footballer who played in the Football League for Glossop North End, Stalybridge Celtic and Newport County.
