= Harry Leddy =

Irish footballer

Personal information
- Full name: Henry Christopher Leddy
- Date of birth: 1884
- Place of birth: Dublin, Ireland
- Height: 5 ft 11 in (1.80 m)
- Position: Centre-half

Senior career*
Years	Team	Apps	(Gls)
1908–1909	Belfast Celtic		
1909–1910	Distillery		
1910–1912	Glenavon		
1912–1914	Shelbourne		
1914–1915	Clyde		
1915–1917	Shelbourne		
1917–1918	Belfast United		
1918–1919	Distillery		
1919–1920	Glenavon		
1920–1921	Tranmere Rovers		
1921–1922	Everton	0	(0)
1922–1923	Chesterfield	45	(7)
1923–1924	Grimsby Town	13	(0)
1924–1925	Shamrock Rovers		
1925–192?	Frankfort		
- * Club domestic league appearances and goals

Henry Christopher Leddy (born 1884; date of death unknown) was an Irish professional footballer who played as a centre-half.
