= Arnold Knight (footballer) =

English footballer (1919–2003)

Personal information
- Full name: Arnold William Knight
- Date of birth: 30 May 1919
- Place of birth: Guisborough, England
- Date of death: 8 October 2003 (aged 84)
- Place of death: Redcar, England
- Positions: Left half; inside left

Youth career
- 1936–1937: Tottenham Hotspur

Senior career*
Years	Team	Apps	(Gls)
1937–1947	Leeds United	0	(0)
1941–1945	→ Leeds United (war guest)	82	(12)
1943–1944	→ Darlington (war guest)	5	(0)
1944–1945	→ Aldershot (war guest)	4	(0)
1945	→ Queens Park Rangers (war guest)	1	(0)
1947–1948	Plymouth Argyle	7	(0)
1948–1949	Bradford City	7	(0)
Total		106	(12)
- * Club domestic league appearances and goals

Arnold William Knight (30 May 1919 – 8 October 2003) was an English professional footballer who played as a left half and inside left.

== Career ==
Born in Guisborough, Knight played for Tottenham Hotspur, Leeds United, Plymouth Argyle and Bradford City. During his time with Bradford City he made seven appearances in the Football League.

He also guested during the Second World War for Leeds United, Darlington, Aldershot and Queens Park Rangers.

== Sources ==
- Frost, Terry (1988). Bradford City A Complete Record 1903-1988. Breedon Books Sport. ISBN 0-907969-38-0.
