= Edmund Baldwin =

English footballer 1902–1968)

Personal information
- Full name: Edmund Baldwin
- Date of birth: 1902
- Place of birth: Preston, England
- Date of death: 12 December 1968 (aged 65–66)
- Place of death: Blackburn, England
- Position: Centre forward

Senior career*
Years	Team	Apps	(Gls)
1921–1922	Tranmere Rovers	1	(0)
- * Club domestic league appearances and goals

Edmund Baldwin (1902–1968) was a footballer who played as a centre forward in the Football League for Tranmere Rovers.
