= Joe Mercer (footballer, born 1889) =

English footballer

Personal information
- Full name: Joseph Powell Mercer
- Date of birth: 21 July 1889
- Place of birth: Higher Bebington, England
- Date of death: 1927 (aged 36–37)
- Height: 6 ft 2 in (1.88 m)
- Position: Centre half

Youth career
- 1908–1909: Burnell's Ironworks

Senior career*
Years	Team	Apps	(Gls)
1909–1910	Ellesmere Port		
1910–	Nottingham Forest	150	(6)
–1921	Ellesmere Port		
1921–1922	Tranmere Rovers	15	(1)
- * Club domestic league appearances and goals

Joseph Powell Mercer (21 July 1889 – 1927) was an English professional footballer who made 150 appearances in the Football League for Nottingham Forest as a centre half. He was the father of footballer and manager Joe Mercer.

== Personal life ==
Mercer worked as a bricklayer before and during his professional football career. He married Ethel Breeze in June 1913 and had four children, the oldest being future footballer and manager Joe Mercer. On 16 December 1914, four months after the outbreak of the First World War and the day after the Football Battalion of the Middlesex Regiment was established, Mercer and Nottingham Forest teammates Tommy Gibson and Harry Iremonger travelled down to London to enlist. He was posted to the front on 17 October 1915. At the front, Mercer was promoted to sergeant, but sustained wounds to the head, leg and shoulder and was captured by the Germans in Oppy on 28 April 1917. He was held in camps at Douai, Bad Langensalza, Giessen and Meschede and returned home in January 1919. In the post-war years, Mercer attempted to resume his football career and continued working as a bricklayer. He died in 1927, of health problems caused by gas he had inhaled in the trenches a decade earlier.

== Career statistics ==
Appearances and goals by club, season and competition
Club	Season	League			FA Cup		Total	
Club	Season	Division	Apps	Goals	Apps	Goals	Apps	Goals
Nottingham Forest	1910–11	First Division	13	0	1	0	14	0
Nottingham Forest	1911–12	Second Division	36	3	1	0	37	3
Nottingham Forest	1912–13	Second Division	37	0	2	0	39	0
Nottingham Forest	1913–14	Second Division	35	2	2	0	37	2
Nottingham Forest	1914–15	Second Division	29	1	2	0	31	1
Career total			150	6	8	0	158	6
