= John Prentice (footballer, born 1898) =

Scottish footballer

Personal information
- Full name: John Hunter Prentice
- Date of birth: 19 October 1898
- Place of birth: Glasgow, Scotland
- Date of death: 28 June 1966 (aged 67)
- Height: 5 ft 7 in (1.70 m)
- Position: Outside left

Senior career*
Years	Team	Apps	(Gls)
1919–1920	Manchester United	1	(0)
1920–1921	Swansea Town	3	(0)
1921–1922	Tranmere Rovers	23	(3)
1922	Hurst		
- * Club domestic league appearances and goals

John Hunter Prentice (19 October 1898 – 28 June 1966) was a Scottish footballer who played as a forward. Born in Glasgow, he lived in Manchester from an early age and played football in the Manchester amateur leagues before being signed by Manchester United, initially as an amateur. He turned professional in November 1919, although it was not until 2 April 1920 that he made his debut, starting at outside left in a 1–0 home defeat to Bradford Park Avenue. That turned out to be his only appearance for Manchester United, as he rejected the terms of their contract offer ahead of the 1920–21 season and signed instead for Swansea Town. Again, he found first-team football difficult to come by, playing just three times in Swansea's Third Division campaign, and he joined Tranmere Rovers for the 1921–22 season. There, he made 23 appearances and scored three goals in the Third Division, adding a further two goals in the FA Cup. He was released at the end of the season and replaced by another former Manchester United outside left, James Robinson.

== Bibliography ==
- Dykes, Garth (1994). The United Alphabet: A Complete Who's Who of Manchester United F.C. Leicester: ACL & Polar Publishing. ISBN 0-9514862-6-8.
- Joyce, Michael (2004). Football League Players' Records 1888 to 1939. Nottingham: Tony Brown. ISBN 978-1-899468-67-6.
- Upton, Gilbert; Wilson, Steve (1997). Tranmere Rovers 1921–1997: A Complete Record. ISBN 978-0-9518648-2-1.
