= List of Wrexham A.F.C. players (25–99 appearances) =

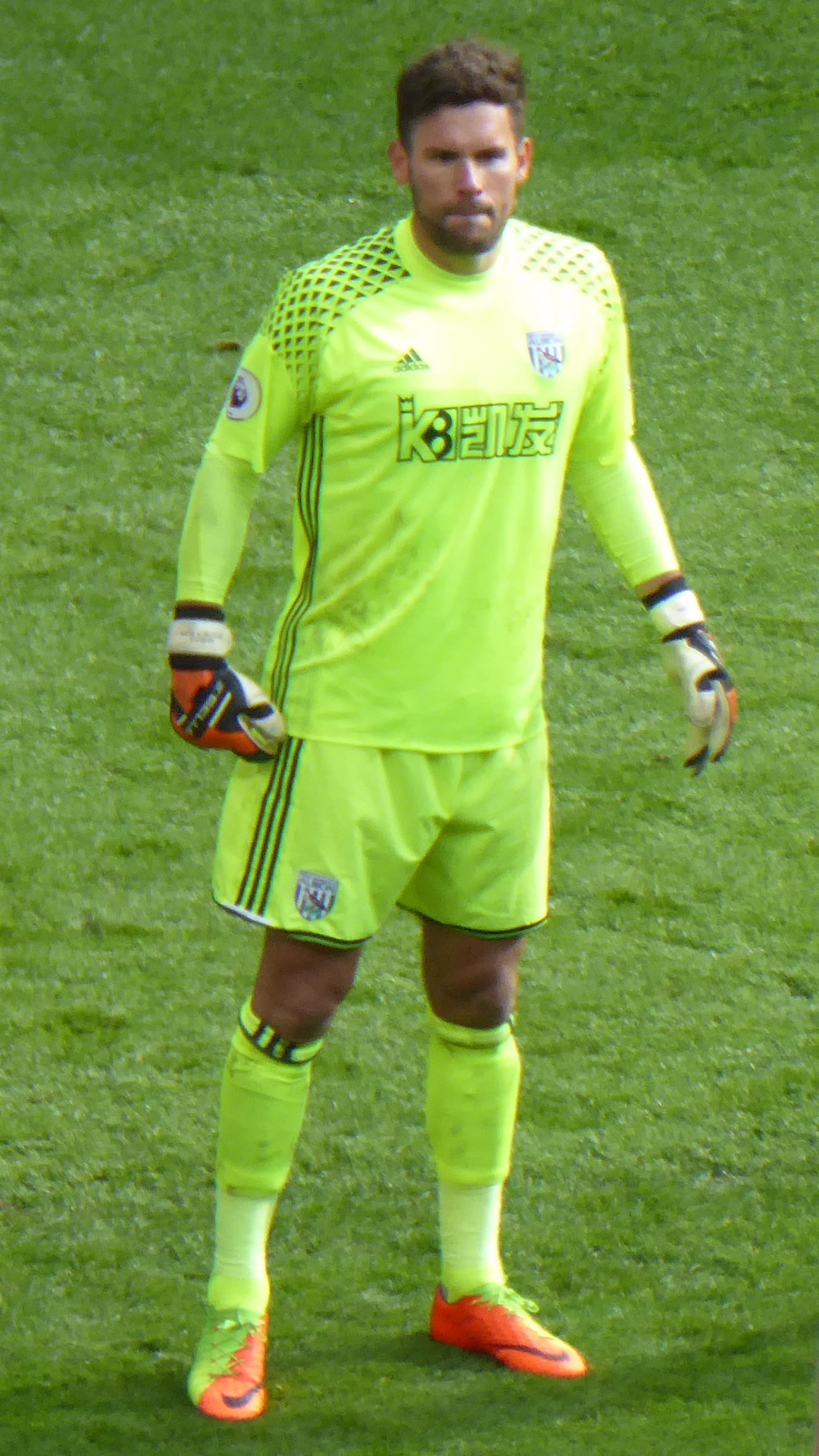
Ben Foster first joined Wrexham on loan in 2005, before returning in 2023 to help the club win the National League title and gain promotion to EFL League Two.

Wrexham Association Football Club is an association football club based in Wrexham, Wales. Founded in October 1864, it is the oldest football club in Wales and the third-oldest professional association football team in the world. After playing in the Combination and regional leagues for several years, Wrexham joined the Football League shortly after the First World War, as a founding member of the new Third Division North. The club remained in the Football League for over 85 years, before they were relegated to the National League in 2008. They remained in the fifth tier of English football for the next 15 seasons, missing out on promotion through the play-offs on five occasions. Wrexham achieved three promotions in three seasons, from 2022 to 2025, through winning the 2022–23 National League, finishing runner-up in the 2023–24 EFL League Two and also in the 2024–25 EFL League One. Thus, Wrexham secured a spot in the EFL Championship, and became the first club across the top five tiers of English football to achieve three consecutive promotions.

Wrexham's first team has competed in numerous nationally and internationally organised competitions. As of the end of the 2023–24 season, a total of 396 players have appeared in between 25 and 99 such matches for the club. The list includes 14 players who are still contracted to the club, so can add to their appearance total. Two Wrexham players with between 25 and 99 appearances went on to manage the club on a caretaker basis – Ralph Burkinshaw (1931–1932) and George Showell (1985).

== Key ==
- The list is ordered first by date of debut, and then if necessary in alphabetical order by surname.
- Appearances as a substitute are included. This feature of the game was introduced in the Football League at the start of the 1965–66 season.

Positions key
Pre-1960s		1960s–	
GK	Goalkeeper		
FB	Full-back	DF	Defender
HB	Half-back	MF	Midfielder
FW	Forward		

Nationality
Unless otherwise noted, the nationality of a player is determined by the country/countries which he has played for, or if said person has not played international football, their country of birth.
Position
Playing positions are listed according to the tactical formations that were employed at the time. Thus, the change in the names of defensive and midfield positions reflects the tactical evolution that occurred from the 1960s onwards.
Club career
Club career is defined as the first and last calendar years in which the player appeared for the club in any of the competitions listed below.
Total appearances and Total goals
Total appearances and goals comprise those in the Combination, Welsh Senior League, Birmingham & District League, English Football League, National League, FA Cup, EFL Cup, Welsh Cup, FA Trophy, EFL Trophy, UEFA Cup Winners' Cup and Scottish Challenge Cup. Matches in wartime competitions are excluded.

== Players ==
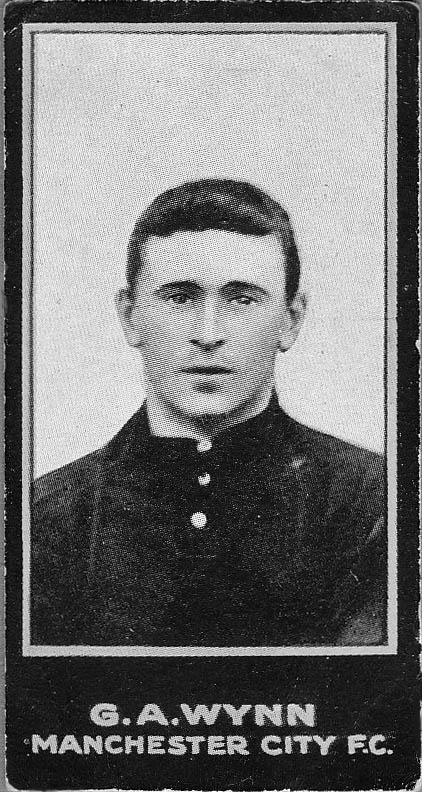
George Wynn was Wrexham's top scorer in his one season at the club, 1908–09, with 28 goals.

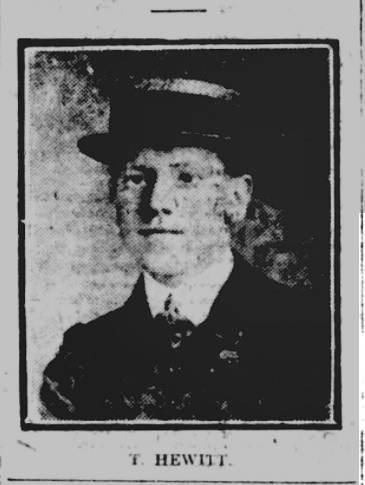
Tom Hewitt spent one season at Wrexham, making 27 appearances at full-back.

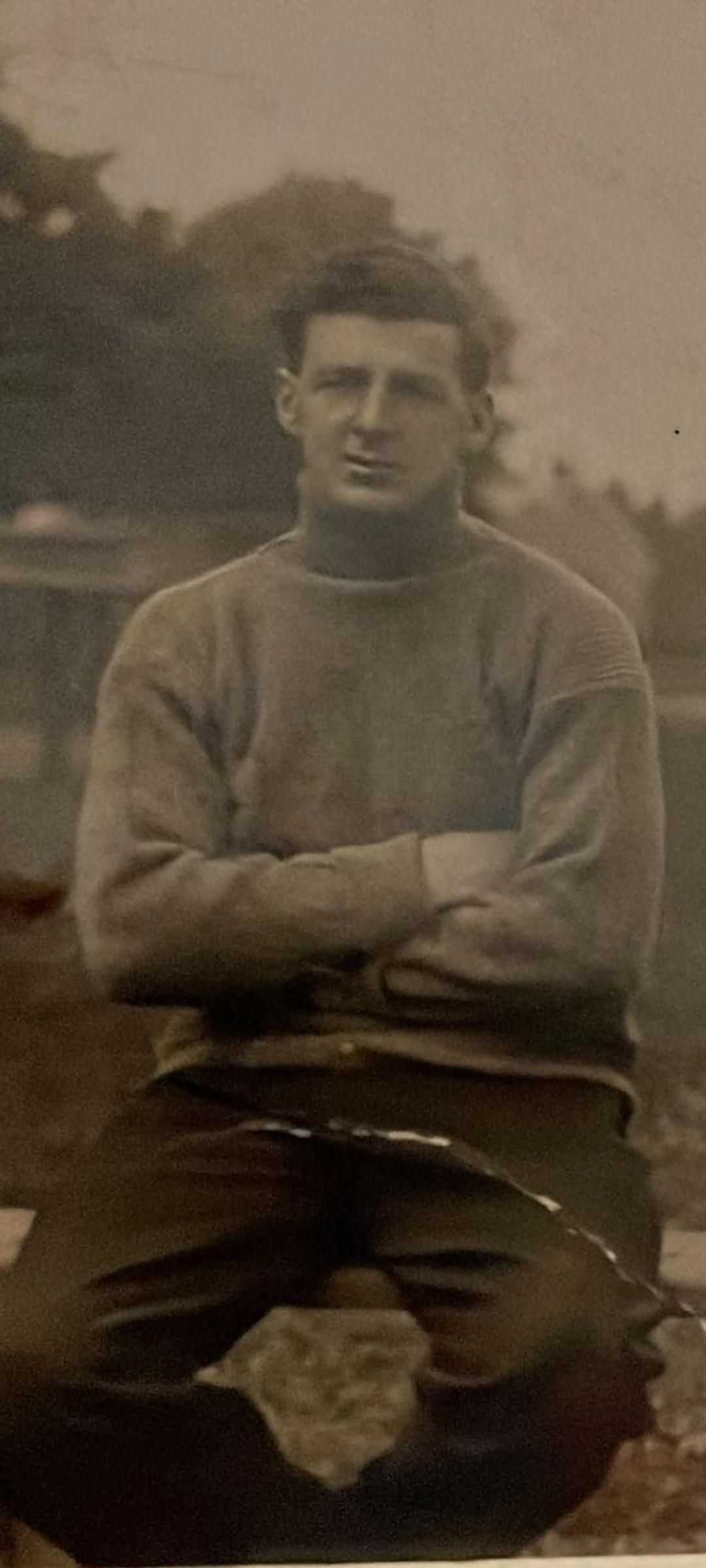
Jimmy Jones scored 26 goals in 45 games, finishing as top scorer in 1924–25.

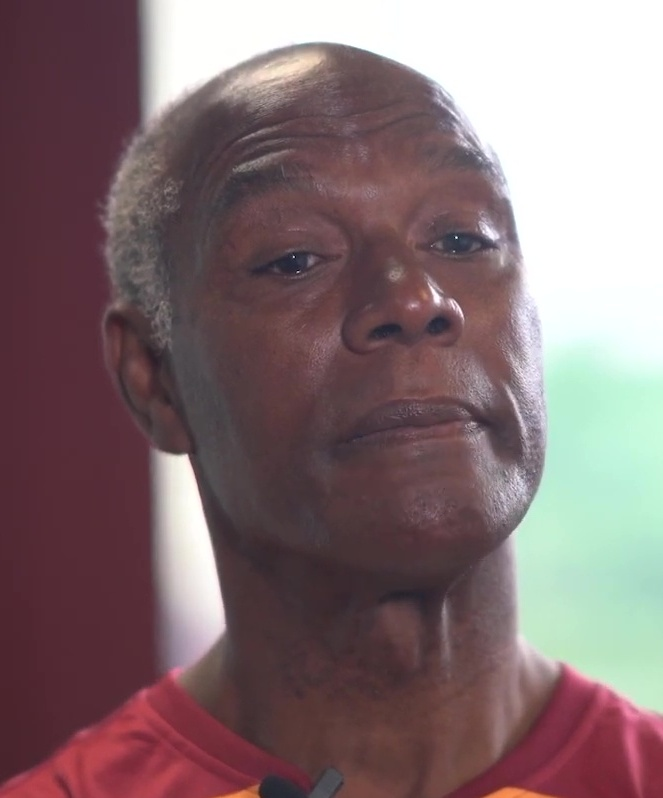
Joe Cooke, one of only two Dominican players for Wrexham, played 70 times for the Red Dragons.

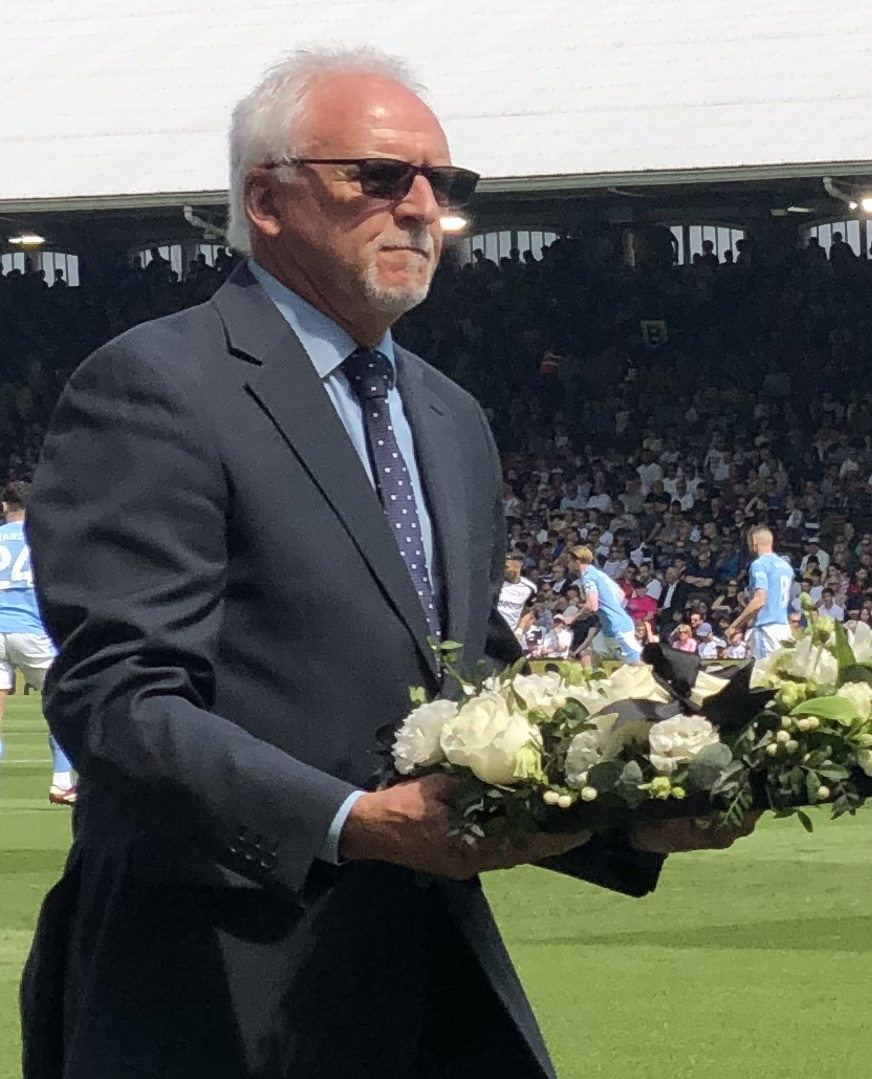
Welsh international Gordon Davies appeared in 29 games during the 1991–92 season.

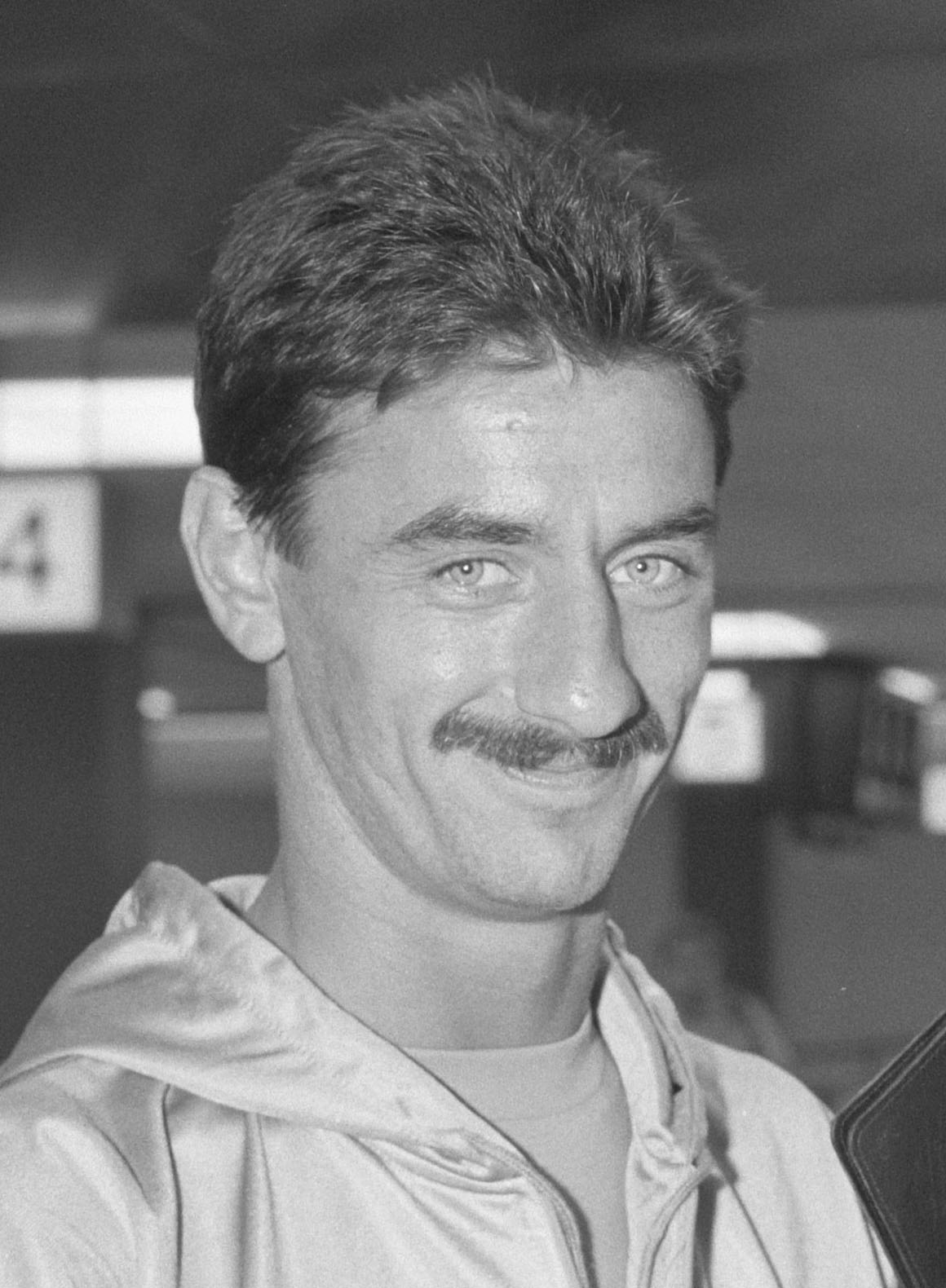
Towards the end of his career, prolific Liverpool striker Ian Rush briefly joined Wrexham, but failed to score in his 27 appearances for the club.

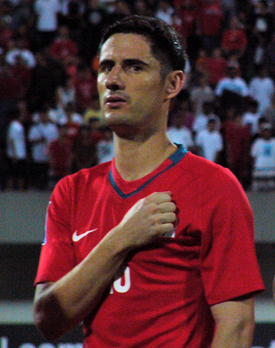
Wrexham's only Singaporean player Daniel Bennett played 29 times for the club.

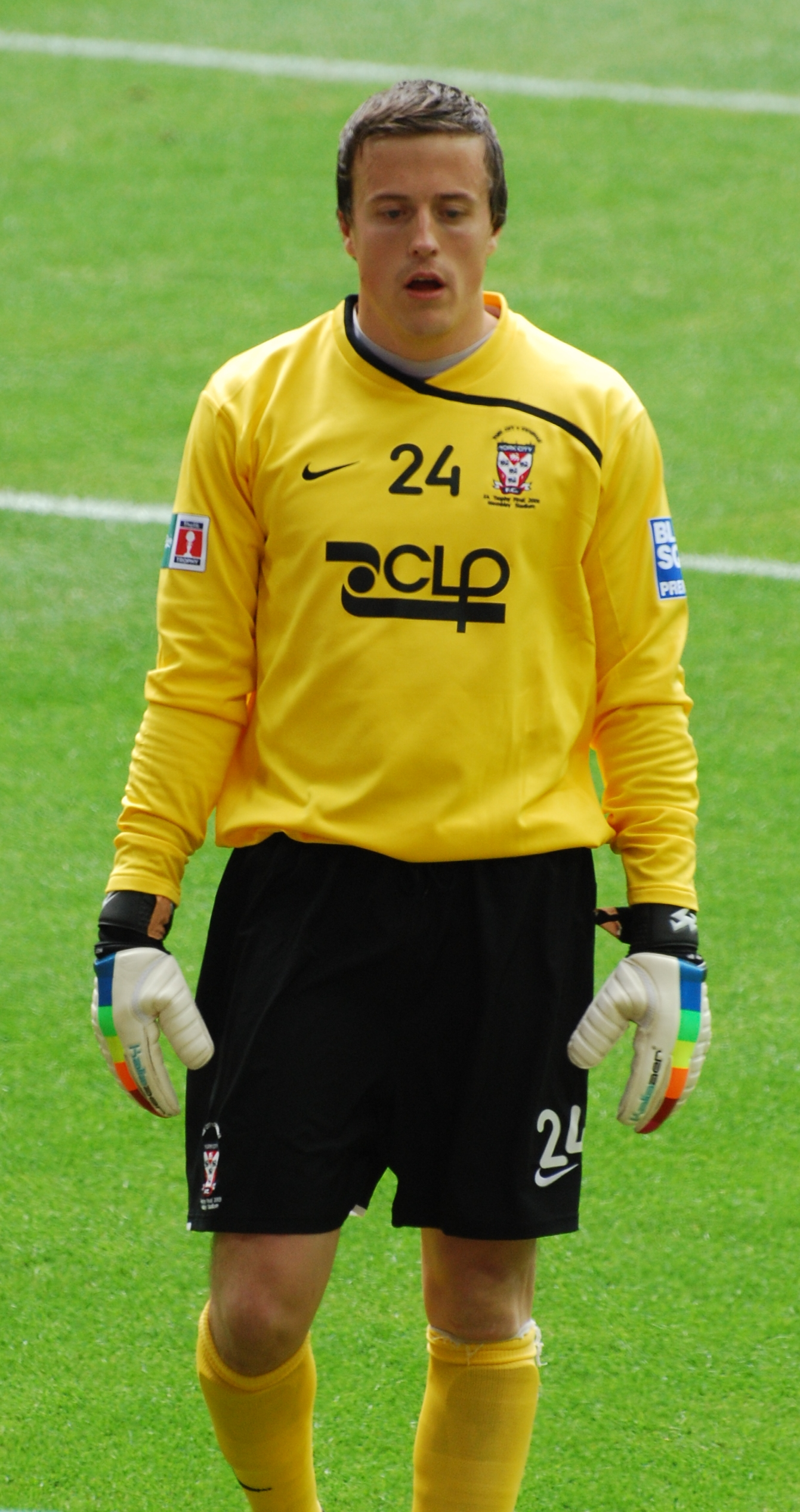
Goalkeeper Michael Ingham made 96 appearances for Wrexham from 2004 to 2007.

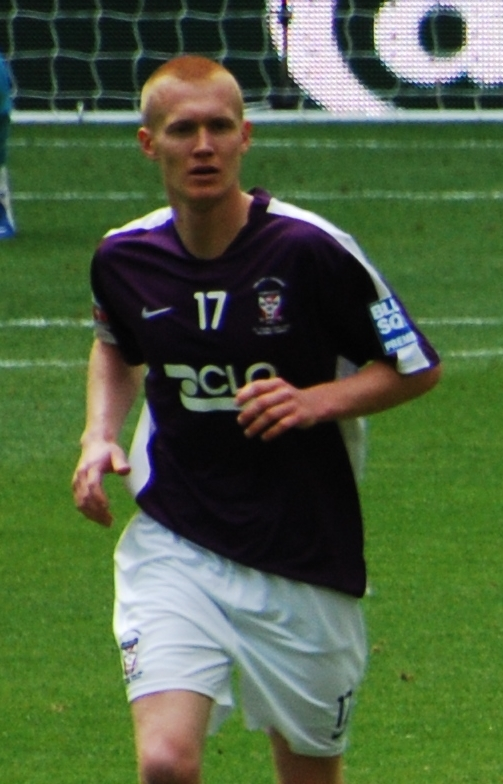
Levi Mackin joined Wrexham as a youth player and went on to make 77 appearances for the first team.

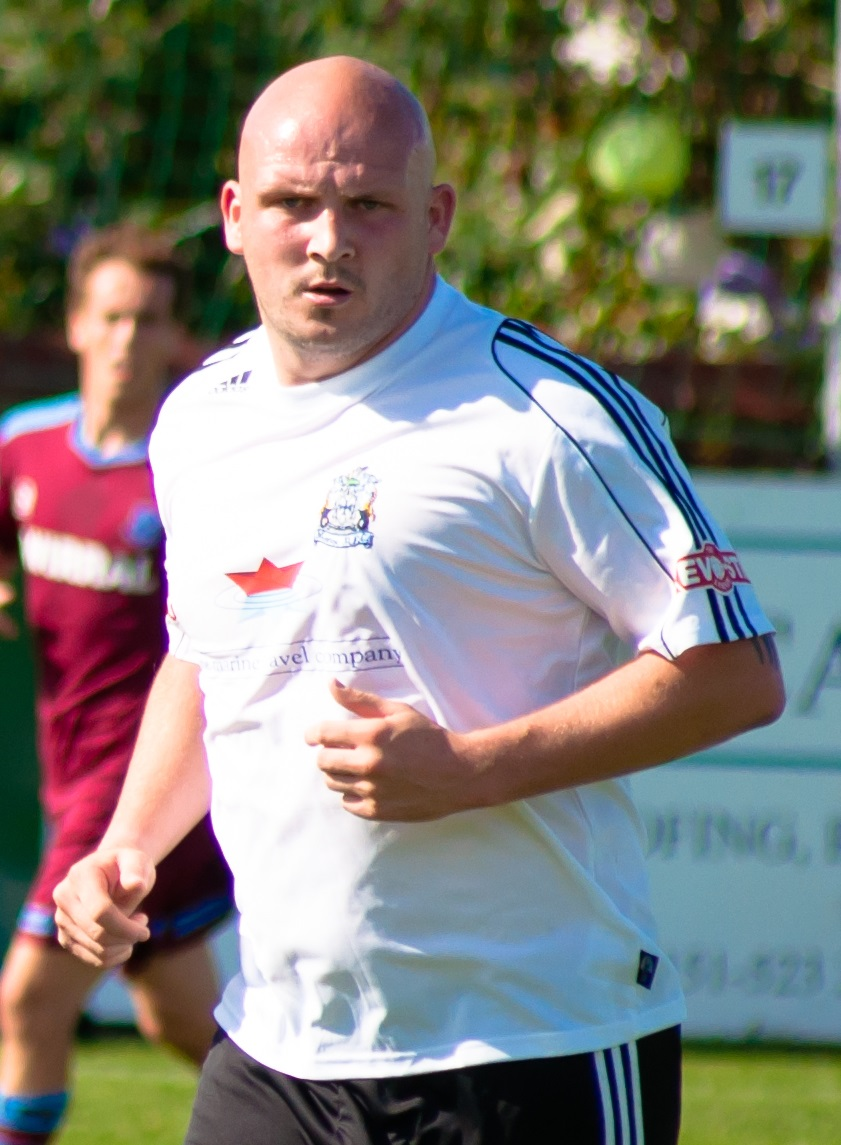
Lee McEvilly scored 16 times in 56 appearances for Wrexham.

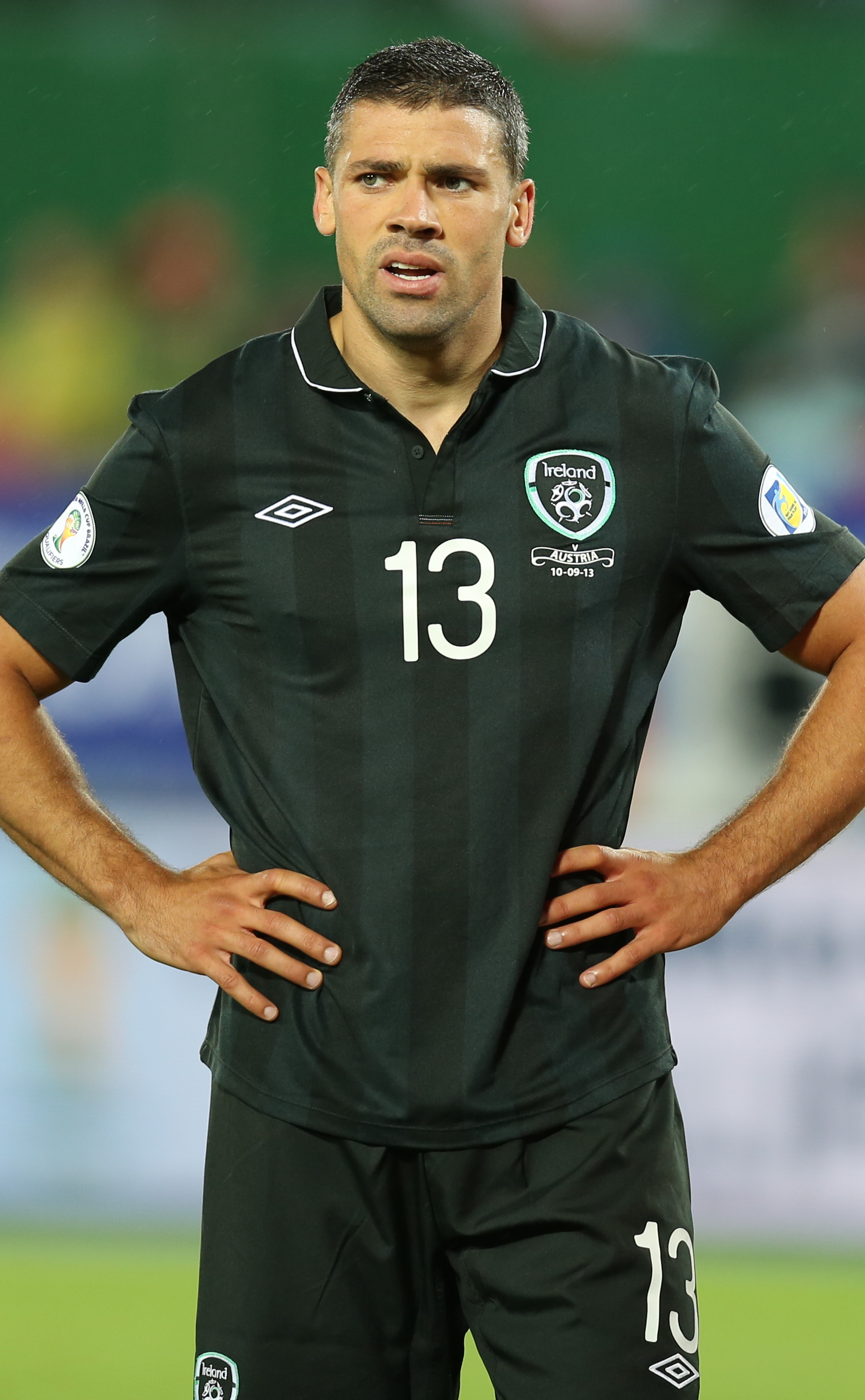
Jonathan Walters appeared 44 times for the Red Dragons, scoring seven goals.

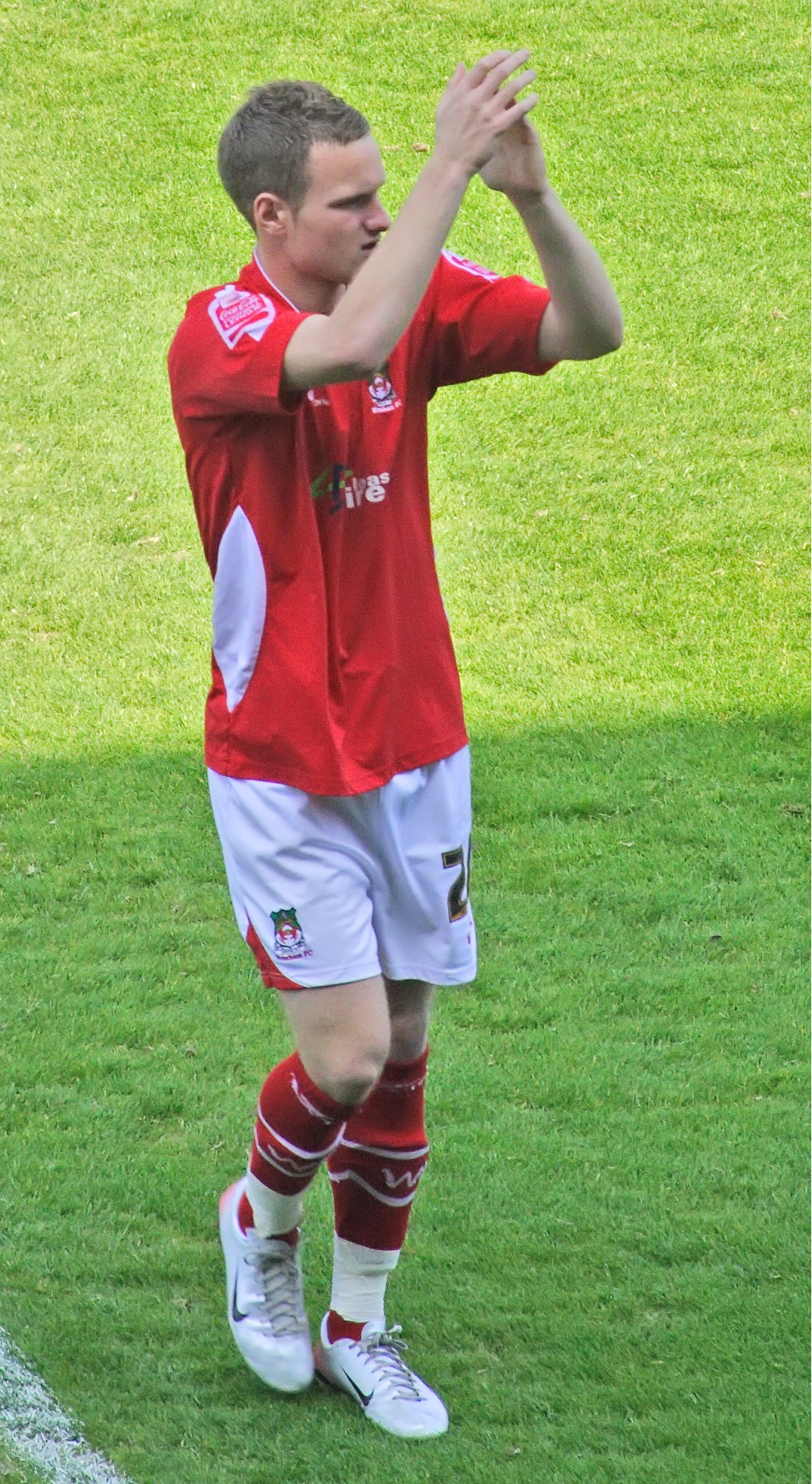
Matt Done debuted for Wrexham aged 17, going on to make 75 appearances for the first team.

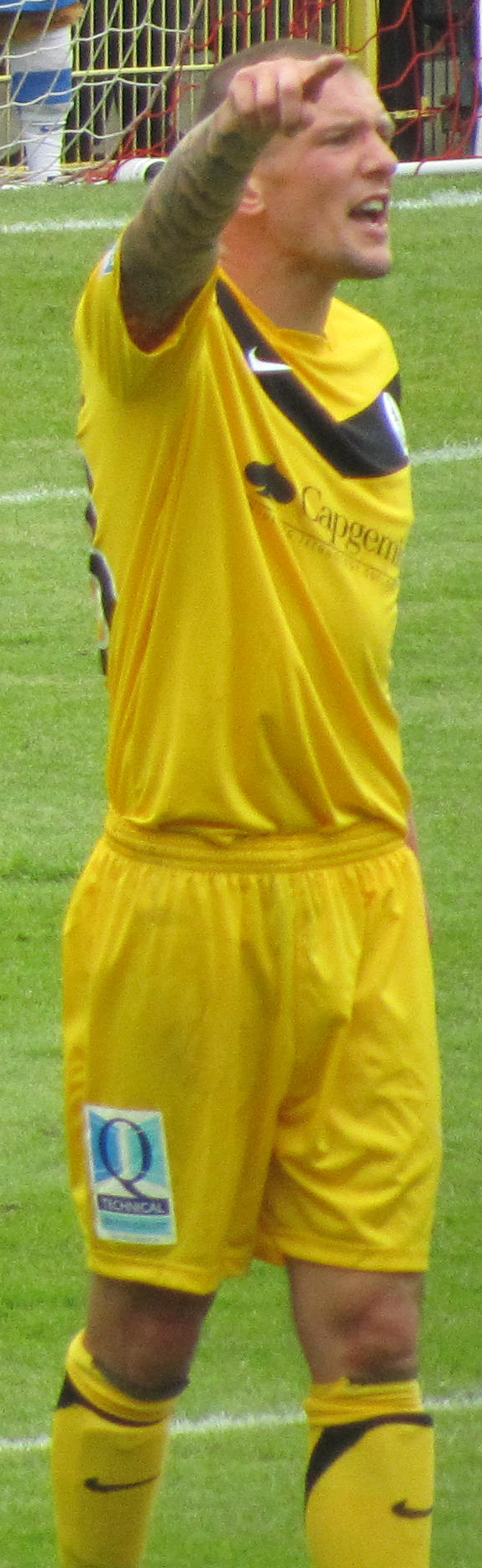
Ryan Valentine scored two goals in 57 games for Wrexham, including a penalty which ensured Football League survival in the 2006–07 season.

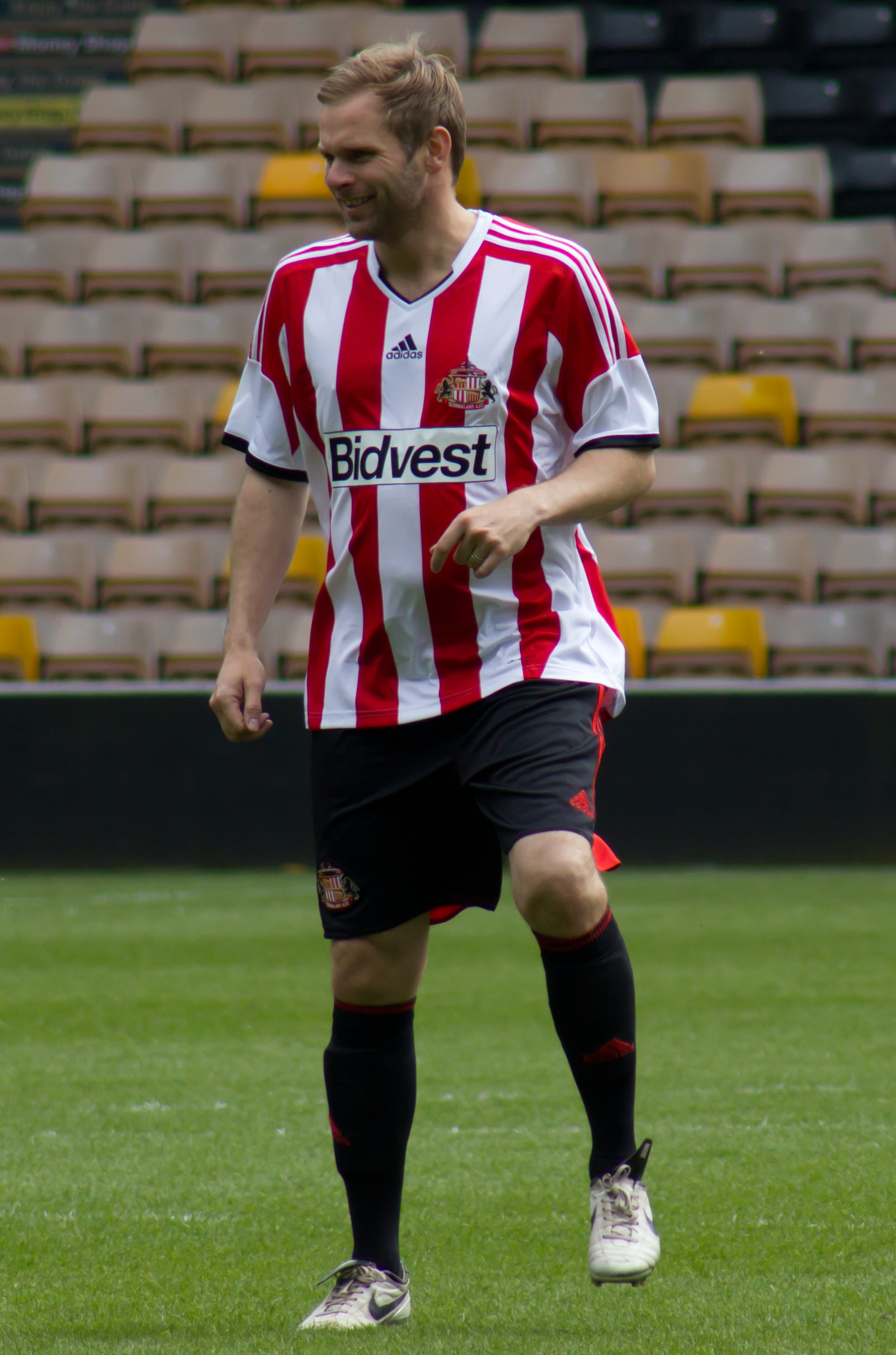
Michael Proctor was Wrexham's top scorer in the 2007–08 season, which saw the club relegated to the Conference for the first time.

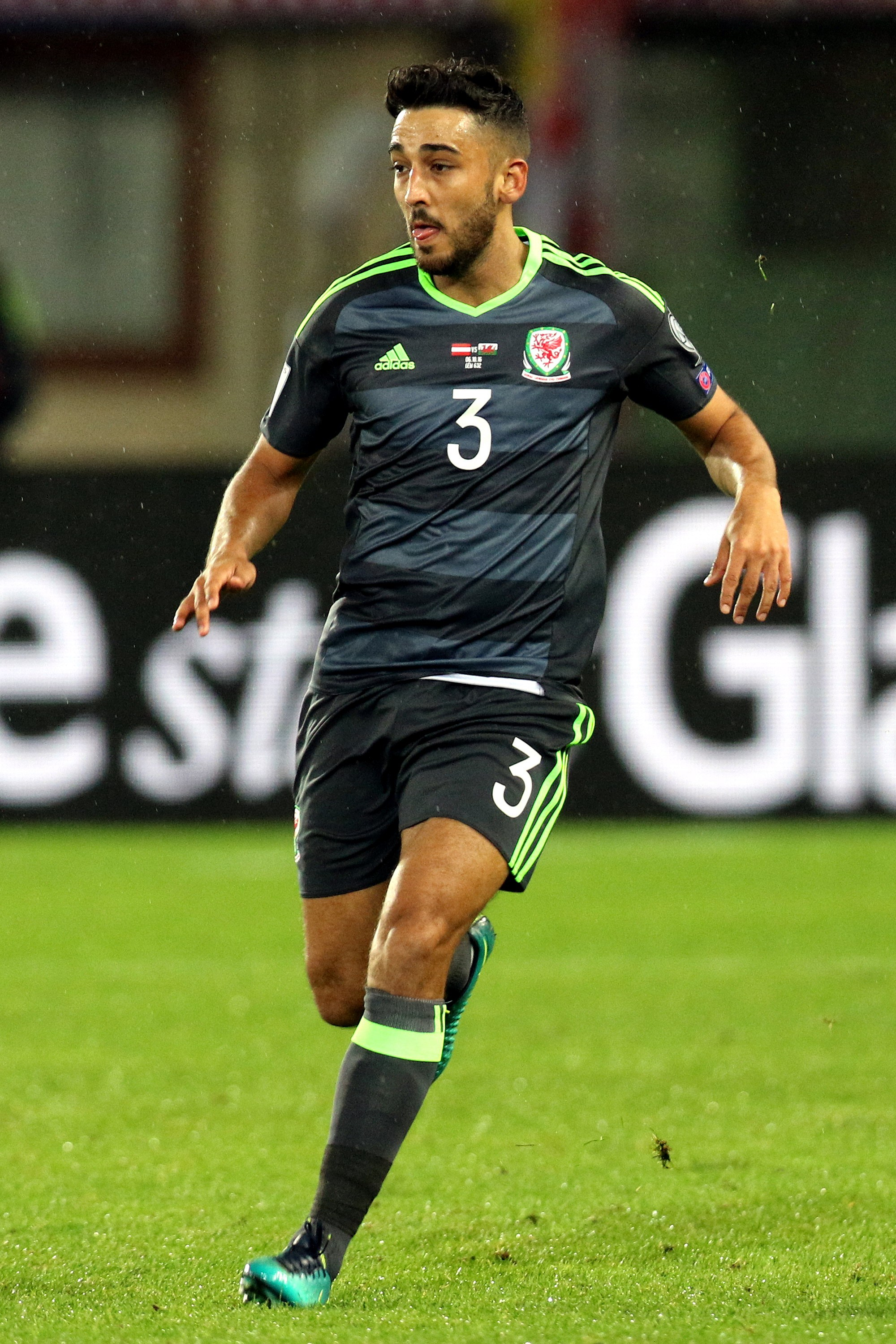
Neil Taylor made 88 appearances for Wrexham, scoring three times.

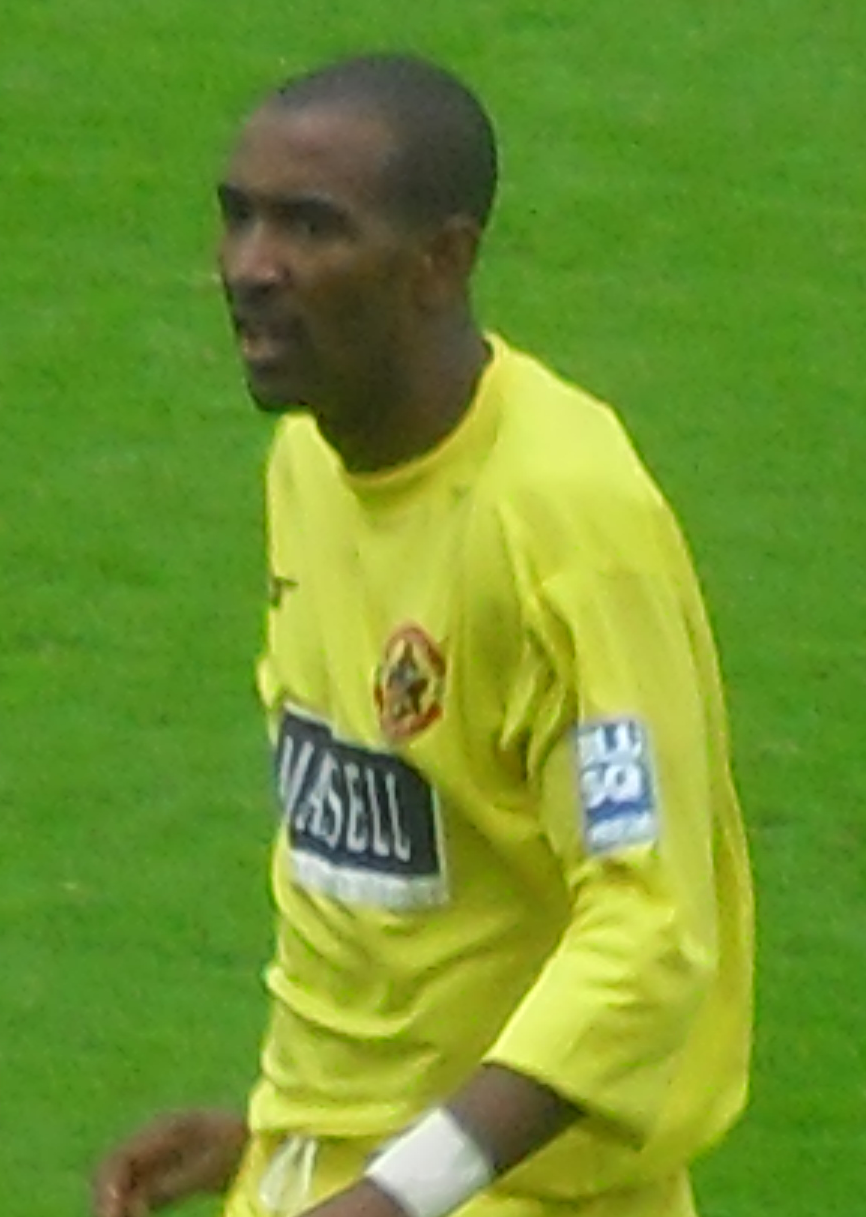
Jefferson Louis finished his only season at Wrexham as the club's top scorer, with 18 goals in 48 games.

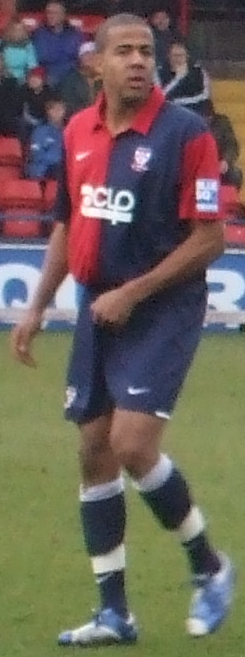
Christian Smith scored on his Wrexham debut, going on to make 51 appearances for the club during two separate spells.

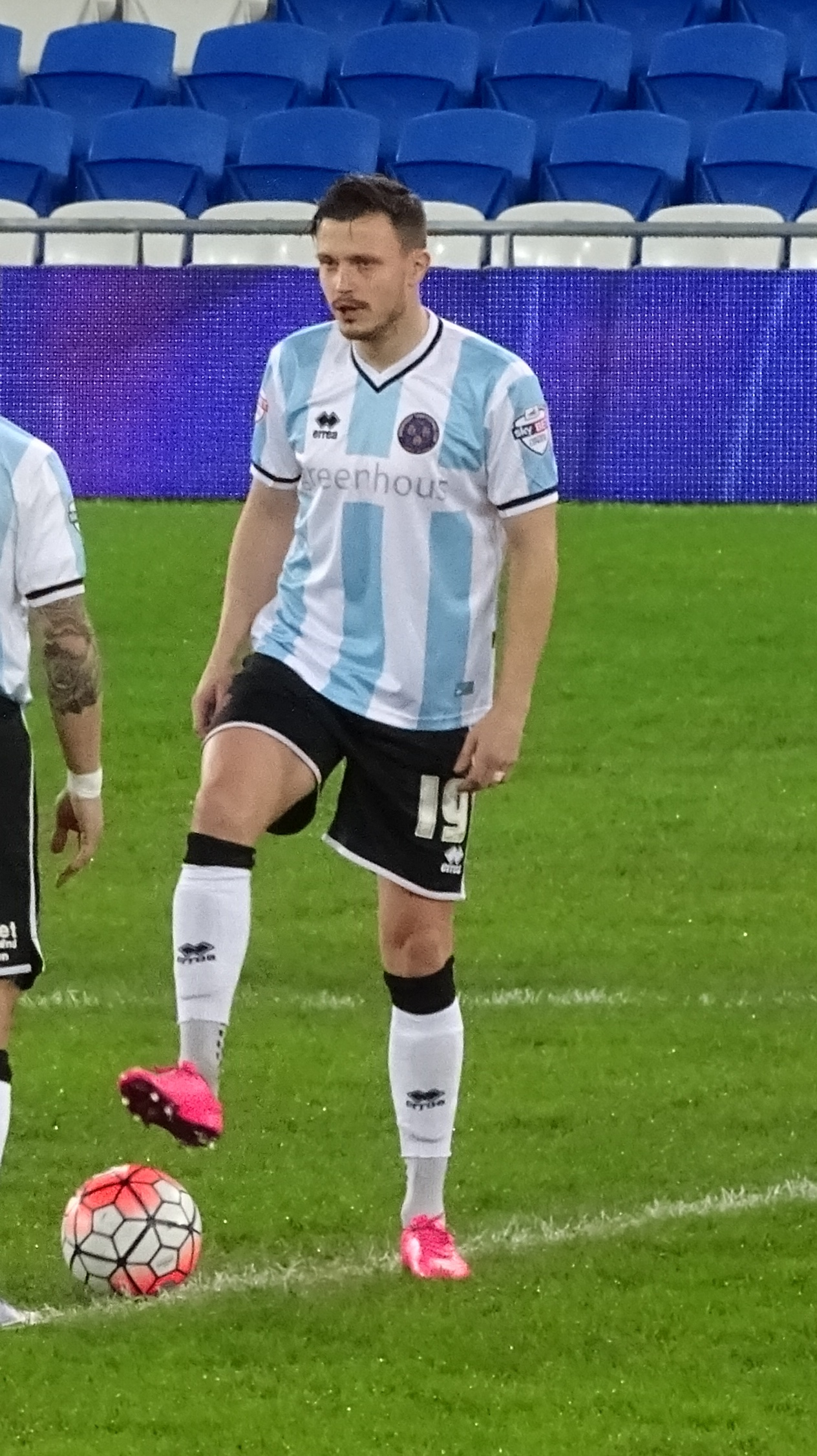
Despite joining halfway through the campaign, Andy Mangan finished the 2009–10 season as Wrexham's joint-top league goalscorer.

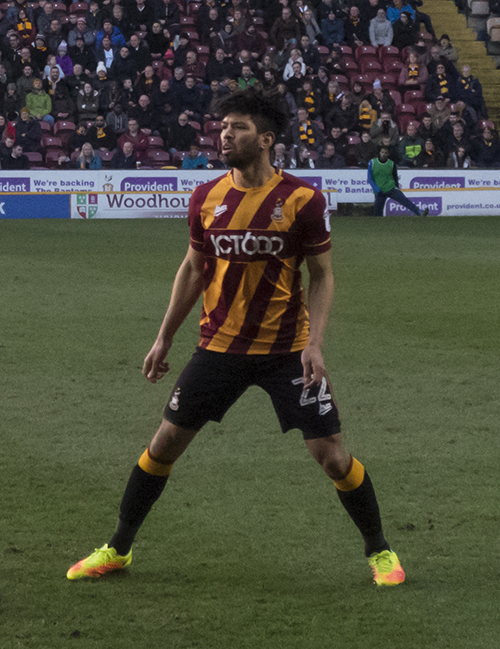
Nathaniel Knight-Percival's two-year spell at Wrexham was his first spell as a professional footballer.

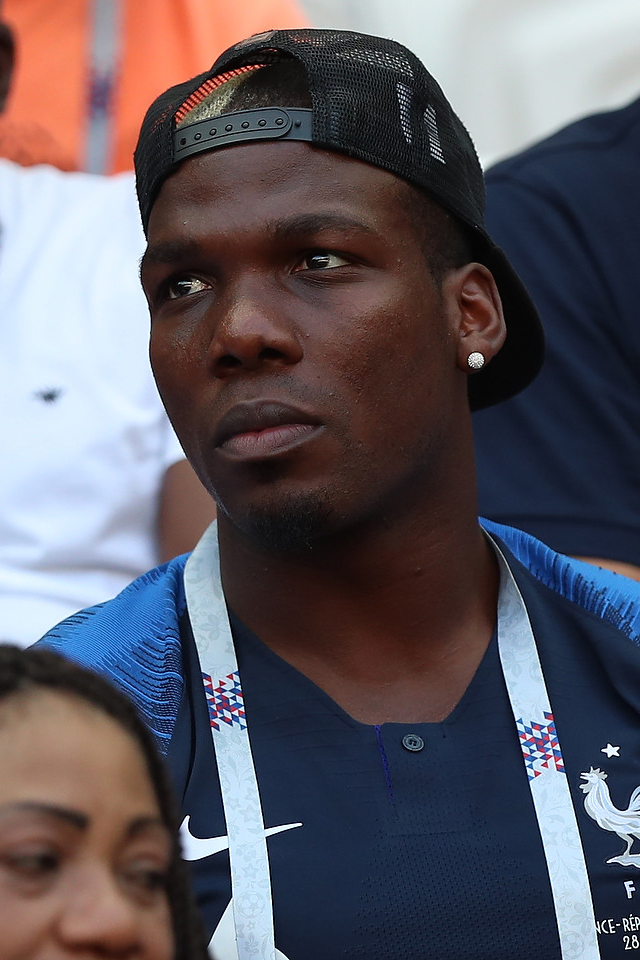
Guinean striker Mathias Pogba played 75 times for Wrexham between 2010 and 2012, scoring 16 goals.

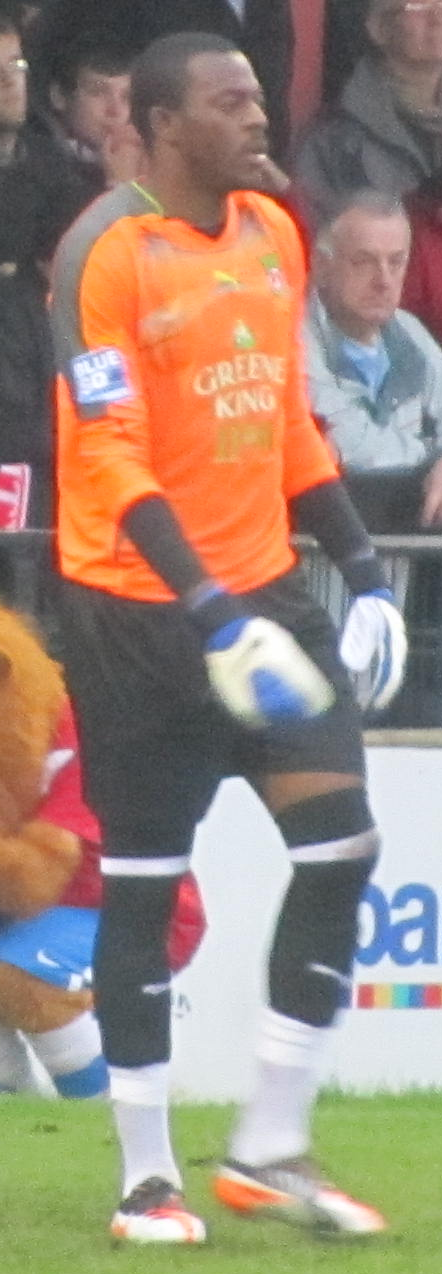
Joslain Mayebi played 91 times for Wrexham, keeping a total of 31 clean sheets during his time at the club.

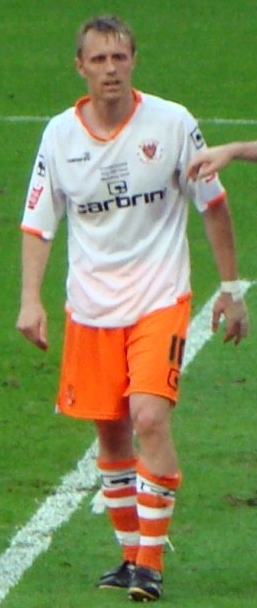
Brett Ormerod scored 15 times in 86 appearances for Wrexham, from 2012 to 2014.

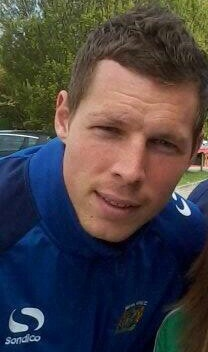
Goalkeeper Chris Dunn made 55 appearances for Wrexham from 2016 to 2018.

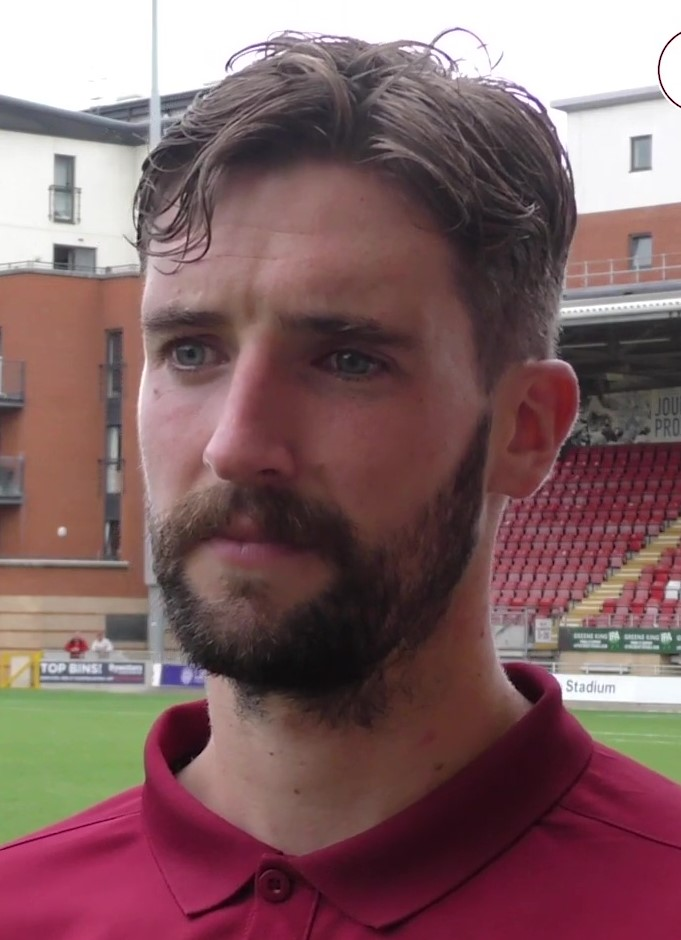
Irish defender Fiacre Kelleher played in every league game of Wrexham's 2020–21 season.

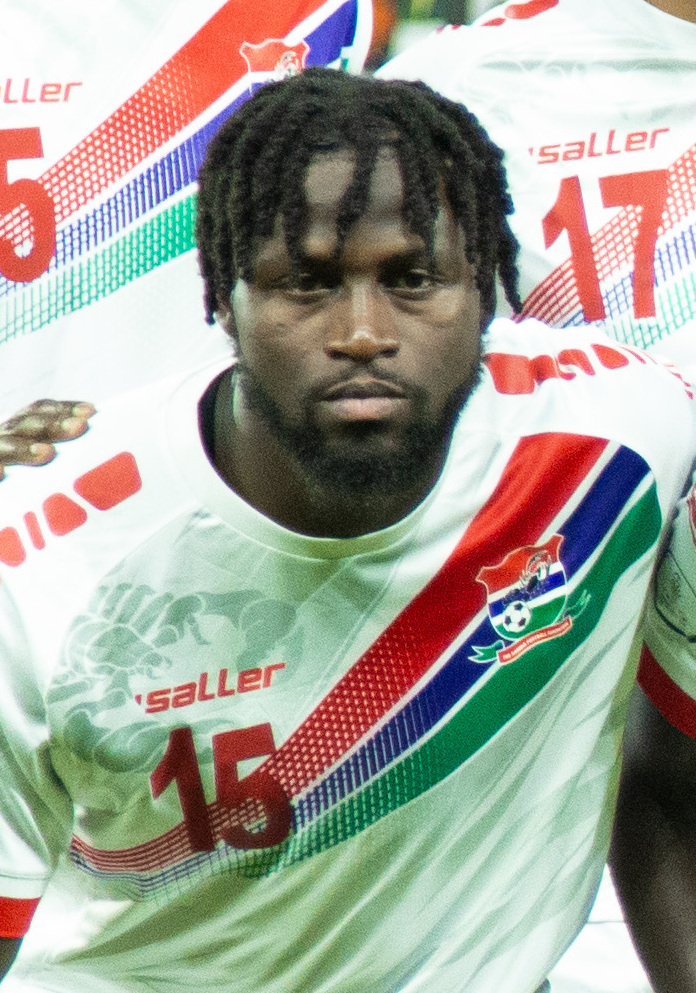
Jacob Mendy joined Wrexham in the summer of 2022 and has made 78 appearances for the club.

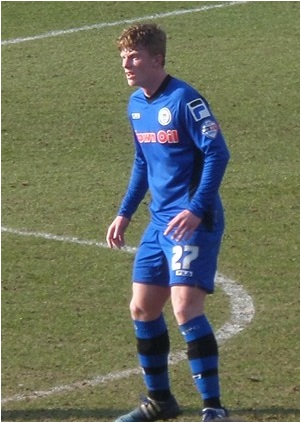
Andy Cannon made 88 apparances for Wrexham between 2022 and 2026.

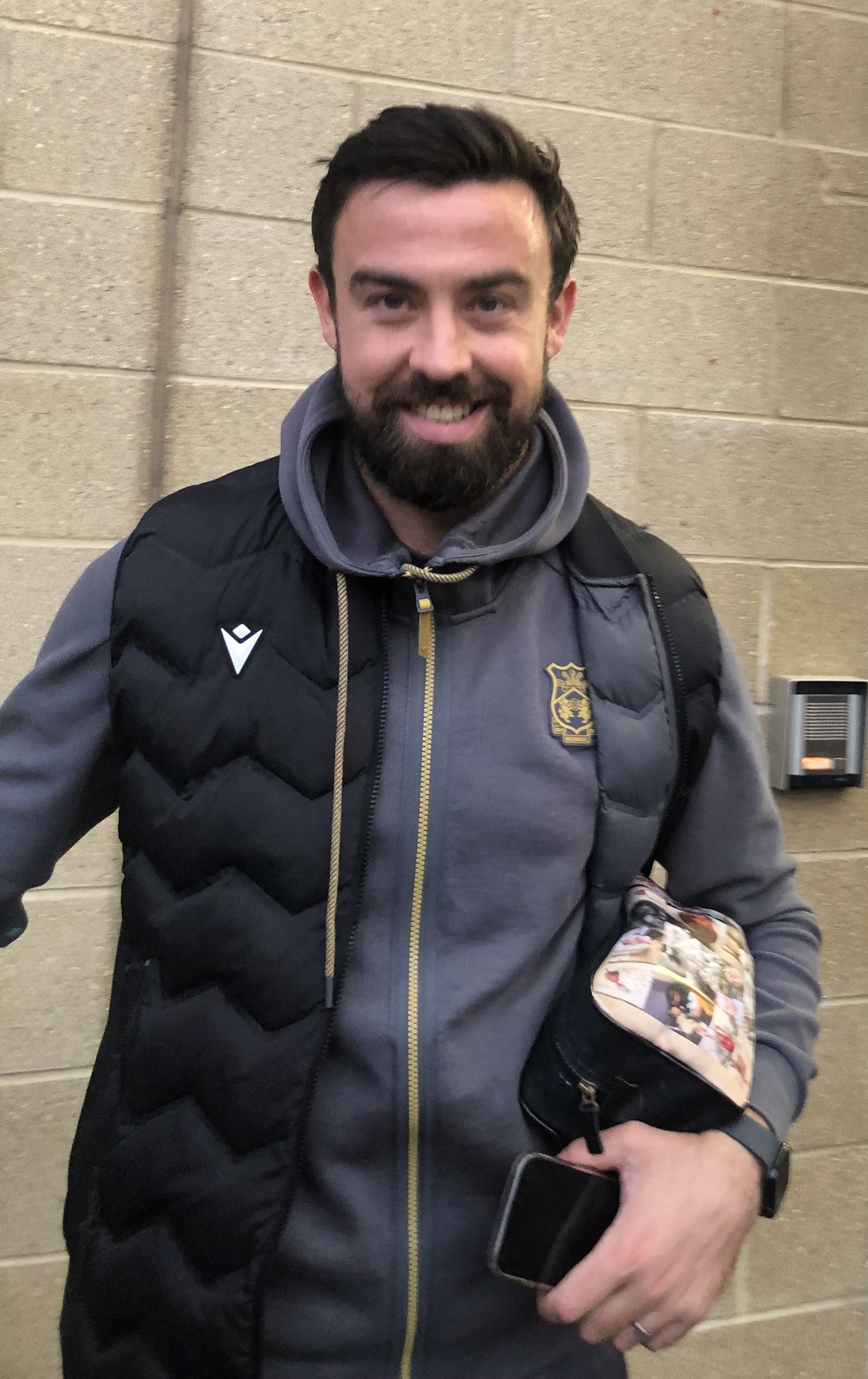
Eoghan O'Connell made 91 appearances for the club between 2023 and 2025.

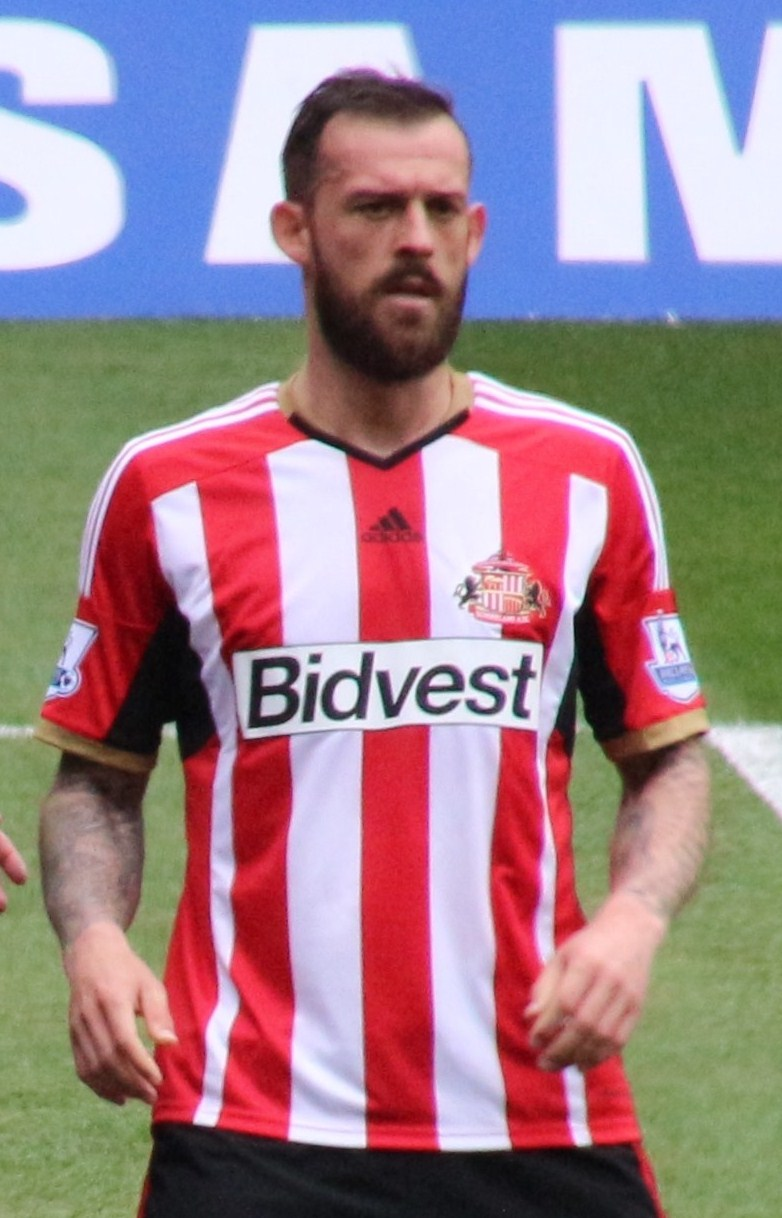
Former Scotland international Steven Fletcher made 77 appearances between 2023 and 2025.

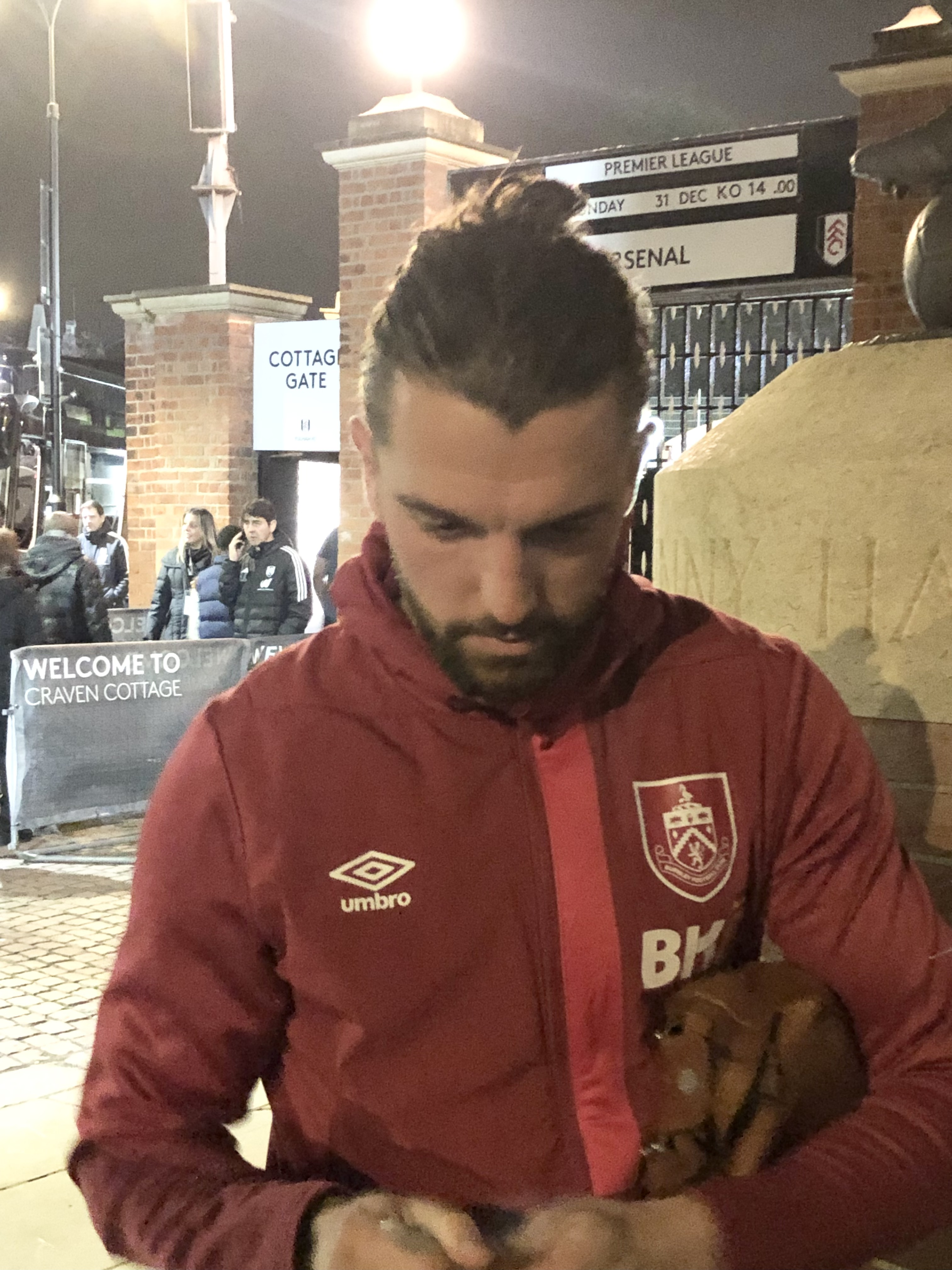
Former England international Jay Rodriguez made 26 appearances between 2025 and 2026.

As of match played 7 November 2026

Players highlighted in bold are still actively playing at Wrexham.

List of Wrexham A.F.C. players with 100 or more appearances
Player	Nationality	Pos	Club career	Starts	Subs	Total	Goals
Player	Nationality	Pos	Club career	Appearances			Goals
Robert Davies	Wales	FW	1881–1891	32	—N/a	32	9
Arthur Lea	Wales	FW	1884–1891	26	—N/a	26	9
William Turner	Wales	FW	1886–1891	30	—N/a	30	20
William Harrison	Wales	HB	1896–1805	42	—N/a	42	5
Mac Robinson	England	HB	1896–1807	83	—N/a	83	3
Tommy Gordon	England	FW	1899–1807	98	—N/a	98	49
William Pountney	Wales	FW	1899–1803	28	—N/a	28	14
Bob Evans	Wales	GK	1899–1803	28	—N/a	28	0
Joseph Owens	Wales	FW	1899–1806	43	—N/a	43	16
William Jones	Wales	FW	1899–1801	26	—N/a	26	13
Di Davies	Wales	FB	1900–1907	88	—N/a	88	1
William Hesketh	Wales	HB	1903–1909	52	—N/a	52	1
Teddy Hughes	Wales	HB	1904–1906; 1911–1912	70	—N/a	70	22
Tracey Morgan	Wales	GK	1904–1907	36	—N/a	36	0
Robert Evans	England	FW	1905–1906	31	—N/a	31	3
Colin Stockton	England	FW	1905–1908	78	—N/a	78	14
Arthur Hughes	Wales	FW	1905–1909	50	—N/a	50	10
J. Freeman	England	FW	1906–1907	34	—N/a	34	23
Harold Uren	England	FW	1906–1908; 1913–1914	54	—N/a	54	16
George Bytheway	England	FW	1906–1907; 1909–1910	72	—N/a	72	31
Gordon Jones	England	FW	1906–1907	39	—N/a	39	14
George Williams	Wales	HB	1906–1907	38	—N/a	38	1
Alf Smith	England	FW	1906–1909	94	—N/a	94	63
Arthur Berry	England	FW	1907–1909; 1911–1913; 1914	71	—N/a	71	20
Joe Percival	Wales	GK	1907–1909	61	—N/a	61	0
Jack Mason	England	FW	1907–1911	55	—N/a	55	28
Jack Lloyd Hughes	Wales	FB	1907–1908	43	—N/a	43	0
W. V. Myatt	Wales	FW/HB	1907–1908	31	—N/a	31	5
Ernest Chapple	Wales	FB	1907–1909	33	—N/a	33	0
Haydn Price	Wales	FW	1908–1909	37	—N/a	37	12
George Wynn	Wales	FW	1908–1909	41	—N/a	41	28
Bruce Rankin	England	FW	1908–1909	27	—N/a	27	12
Edward Husbands	Wales	GK	1909–1910	58	—N/a	58	0
Dick Allman	England	FW	1909–1910	39	—N/a	39	18
Sid Corfield	England	HB	1909–1911	77	—N/a	77	9
Percy Evans	Wales	FW	1909–1910	41	—N/a	41	8
William Fenner	England	FB	1909–1910; 1913–1914	83	—N/a	83	3
William Hancock	Wales	FB	1909–1910	34	—N/a	34	1
Arthur Cook	England	FB	1910–1911	40	—N/a	40	0
Tom Hewitt	Wales	HB	1910–1911	27	—N/a	27	0
John Roberts	Wales	FW	1910–1912	85	—N/a	85	62
Jack Pedley	England	FW	1910–1911	27	—N/a	27	5
Walter Davies	Wales	FW	1910–1912	36	—N/a	36	16
James Roberts	Wales	FW	1911–1913	66	—N/a	66	9
Francis Hughes	Wales	FB	1911–1915	91	—N/a	91	0
Sam Samuels	Wales	FW	1911–1913	28	—N/a	28	14
Arthur Griffiths	England	FW	1912–1914	30	—N/a	30	3
Alfred Rowlands	Wales	FW	1912–1913	36	—N/a	36	19
Jack Lipsham	England	FW	1913–1914	40	—N/a	40	7
Caradoc Davies	Wales	FW	1914–1915	42	—N/a	42	3
George Davies	Wales	FW	1914–1915	45	—N/a	45	18
Billy Douglas	Wales	FW	1914–1915	33	—N/a	33	14
David Jardine	Wales	FW	1915–1921	65	—N/a	65	14
Fred Boxley	England	GK	1919–1920	42	—N/a	42	0
Bob Griffiths	Wales	HB	1919–1920; 1921	44	—N/a	44	1
Frank Roberts	Wales	FW	1919–1921	32	—N/a	32	2
Trevor Jones	Wales	FB	1919–1920	39	—N/a	39	0
John Taylor	Wales	FW	1920–1921	35	—N/a	35	28
Bert Foster	Wales	HB	1920–1921	58	—N/a	58	5
Frank Blew	Wales	FB	1920–1922; 1924; 1926	51	—N/a	51	1
Jack Ellis	Wales	FB	1920–1922	58	—N/a	58	0
Reg Jones	Wales	FW	1920–1921	39	—N/a	39	16
Leslie Murphy	Northern Ireland	GK	1920–1922	41	—N/a	41	0
Matthew Burton	England	FW	1921–1923	67	—N/a	67	13
Ernie Lloyd	England	FW	1921–1922	37	—N/a	37	2
Jack Moorwood	England	HB	1921–1923	77	—N/a	77	2
John Settle	England	FB	1921–1923	28	—N/a	28	0
Jack Jones	Wales	FW	1922–1924	64	—N/a	64	15
Alf Sheldon	England	FW	1922–1923	40	—N/a	40	5
George Holmes	England	FB	1922–1923	39	—N/a	39	0
Willie Jackson	Scotland	FW	1922–1924	65	—N/a	65	19
Thomas Griffiths	Wales	HB	1923–1926; 1938–1939	54	—N/a	54	2
Billy Harrison	England	FW	1923–1924	35	—N/a	35	0
James Pugh	England	FB	1923–1925	41	—N/a	41	0
Jesse Williams	Wales	FW	1923–1924	41	—N/a	41	3
Billy Toms	Ireland	FW	1923–1924	51	—N/a	51	10
Billy Matthews	Wales	HB	1923–1925	72	—N/a	72	2
Frank Jones	England	FW	1924–1927	39	—N/a	39	10
Jack Nock	England	FW	1924–1926	72	—N/a	72	26
Jimmy Jones	Wales	FW	1924–1926	45	—N/a	45	26
Alf Beevor	England	HB	1925–1927	42	—N/a	42	1
Jimmy Lyons	England	FW	1925–1926	37	—N/a	37	14
Tom Parker	England	HB	1925–1926	36	—N/a	36	1
Algernon Wilkinson	England	GK	1925–1926	39	—N/a	39	0
Ted Bennett	England	FB	1925–1926	41	—N/a	41	0
James Smith	Scotland	FW	1926–1928	72	—N/a	72	24
Ed Robson	England	GK	1926–1928	83	—N/a	83	0
Cecil Smith	Wales	FW	1927–1928	51	—N/a	51	29
George Bellis	England	HB	1927–1929	92	—N/a	92	5
Wynne Crompton	Wales	FB	1927–1932	79	—N/a	79	0
Teddy Read	Wales	HB	1928–1930	44	—N/a	44	0
Billy Mays	Wales	FW	1928–1930	60	—N/a	60	46
Bob Hudson	England	FW	1928–1930	40	—N/a	40	13
Ted Taylor	England	GK	1928–1929	27	—N/a	27	0
Bob Ross	Scotland	HB	1929–1930	33	—N/a	33	1
Bill Dickie	Scotland	HB	1929–1930	25	—N/a	25	0
Bert Williams	Wales	FW	1929–1930	25	—N/a	25	4
Gordon Bell	England	FW	1929–1930	30	—N/a	30	7
Ralph Burkinshaw	England	HB	1930–1932	74	—N/a	74	2
John Donoghue	Scotland	HB	1930–1932	77	—N/a	77	2
Sam Taylor	England	FW	1930–1932	95	—N/a	95	38
John Clayton	England	HB	1930–1932	58	—N/a	58	1
John Brown	England	FB	1931–1933	99	—N/a	99	0
Wilf Burrows	England	GK	1931–1932	35	—N/a	35	0
Ted Adams	England	GK	1931–1935	99	—N/a	99	0
Harry Beck	England	HB	1932–1934	35	—N/a	35	2
Alex Findlay	Scotland	FW	1932–1935	29	—N/a	29	6
Bobby Weale	Wales	FW	1933–1935	26	—N/a	26	4
Bob Foster	England	GK	1933–1934	35	—N/a	35	0
Jack Fryer	England	FW	1933–1936	92	—N/a	92	30
Billy Bryant	England	FW	1933–1934	45	—N/a	45	17
David Richards	Wales	HB	1934–1936	56	—N/a	56	0
Eric Stubbs	England	FW	1934–1935	34	—N/a	34	12
Archie Gardiner	Scotland	FW	1934–1936	51	—N/a	51	13
Ehud Rogers	Wales	FW	1934–1935; 1946	67	—N/a	67	24
Vic Evans	Wales	FB	1935–1938	96	—N/a	96	0
Charlie MacCartney	England	FW	1935–1937	54	—N/a	54	27
Ron Jones	Wales	FW	1935–1938	87	—N/a	87	22
Ambrose Brown	England	FW	1936–1937	32	—N/a	32	5
Adam Mitchell	Scotland	HB	1936–1937	42	—N/a	42	2
Alfie White	England	FW	1936–1937	25	—N/a	25	5
Harold Lapham	England	FW	1936–1939	76	—N/a	76	41
James Raven	England	HB	1937–1939	61	—N/a	61	1
Bill Bellamy	England	FB	1937–1939	75	—N/a	75	0
Wally Odell	England	HB	1937–1939	68	—N/a	68	0
George Burditt	England	FW	1937–1939	76	—N/a	76	44
James Matthias	Wales	HB	1938–1939	31	—N/a	31	0
Bert Adamson	Scotland	FW	1938–1939	40	—N/a	40	16
George Poland	Wales	GK	1938–1939	44	—N/a	44	0
Albert Nelson	Wales	FW	1938–1939	32	—N/a	32	13
Ted Savage	England	HB	1938–1939	31	—N/a	31	0
Jackie Williams	Wales	FW	1938–1939	30	—N/a	30	6
Cyril Jones	Wales	FB	1945–1947	34	—N/a	34	1
Tommy Gardner	England	HB	1945–1947	39	—N/a	39	5
Johnny Mortimer	England	FB	1945–1948	28	—N/a	28	0
Roy Brown	England	FW	1946–1947	29	—N/a	29	4
Alf Pritchard	England	FW	1946–1949	40	—N/a	40	8
Billy Tudor	Wales	HB	1946–1948	65	—N/a	65	2
Frank Williams	Wales	GK	1946–1948	38	—N/a	38	0
Jesse McLarty	Scotland	FW	1946–1947	29	—N/a	29	13
Wally Roberts	Wales	HB	1946–1948	67	—N/a	67	1
Jack Leyfield	England	HB	1946–1950	37	—N/a	37	1
Stan Roberts	Wales	FW	1946–1948	29	—N/a	29	11
Charlie Kelsall	Wales	DF	1947–1951	41	—N/a	41	0
Eddie Beynon	Wales	FW	1947–1951	82	—N/a	82	27
Dick Yates	Wales	FW	1947–1948	34	—N/a	34	24
Fred Rowell	England	FW	1948–1950	47	—N/a	47	5
John Graham	England	FW	1949–1952	47	—N/a	47	7
Les Donaldson	Scotland	FW	1950–1951	33	—N/a	33	6
Frank Fidler	England	FW	1950–1951	38	—N/a	38	16
Stewart McCallum	Scotland	HB	1950–1953	76	—N/a	76	0
Cyril Lawrence	England	FW	1950–1952	57	—N/a	57	12
Bob Connor	England	GK	1951–1954	88	—N/a	88	0
Peter Fisher	Scotland	FB	1951–1954	96	—N/a	96	0
Eric Hope	England	FW	1951–1954	45	—N/a	45	13
Dennis Griffiths	Wales	HB	1952–1957	79	—N/a	79	3
Tommy Tilston	England	FW	1952–1954	89	—N/a	89	33
Jack Capper	Wales	HB	1952–1955	56	—N/a	56	0
Bill Heggie	Scotland	FW	1952–1954	36	—N/a	36	15
Pat Egglestone	England	GK	1953–1956	95	—N/a	95	0
Phil Gwatkin	England	FW	1953–1956	63	—N/a	63	11
Eric Betts	England	FW	1953–1956	62	—N/a	62	24
Brian Jarvis	Wales	HB	1954–1959	72	—N/a	72	4
Les Samuels	England	FW	1954	26	—N/a	26	11
Billy Green	England	HB	1954–1957	71	—N/a	71	3
Arthur Rowley	England	FW	1954–1956	62	—N/a	62	9
Elfed Evans	Wales	FW	1955–1956	36	—N/a	36	18
Peter Thompson	England	FW	1955–1957	55	—N/a	55	30
David Jones	Wales	FW	1956–1959	88	—N/a	88	12
Gwyn Morgans	Wales	HB	1956–1958	33	—N/a	33	2
Tom McNab	New Zealand	HB	1957–1959	47	—N/a	47	6
Rolando Ugolini	Italy	GK	1957–1960	93	—N/a	93	0
Ken Jones	Wales	FB	1957–1960	36	—N/a	36	0
Ken Murray	England	FW	1958–1959	38	—N/a	38	17
Peter Brown	England	FW	1958–1960	33	—N/a	33	9
Paddy Sowden	England	FW	1958–1959	43	—N/a	43	5
Don Weston	England	FW	1958–1960; 1966–1968	96	0	96	0
Brian Cripsey	England	FW	1958–1960	28	—N/a	28	3
Ewan Fenton	Scotland	HB	1959–1960	27	—N/a	27	0
Charlie Hughes	England	GK	1959–1961	44	—N/a	44	0
Stan Bennion	England	FW	1959–1962	64	—N/a	64	21
Ron Roberts	Wales	FW	1960–1962	83	—N/a	83	4
Reg Hunter	Wales	FW	1960–1961	40	—N/a	40	4
Ron Harbertson	England	FW	1960	34	—N/a	34	14
Arthur Johnson	England	GK	1960–1962	61	—N/a	61	0
Wyn Davies	Wales	FW	1960–1962	67	—N/a	67	26
Tecwyn Jones	Wales	HB	1961–1964	70	—N/a	70	3
Roy Ambler	England	FW	1961–1962	26	—N/a	26	14
Kevin Keelan	England	GK	1961–1963	80	—N/a	80	0
Brian Whitehouse	England	FW	1962–1963	54	—N/a	54	27
Terry Morrall	England	HB/FB	1963–1965	49	—N/a	49	0
Bill Myerscough	England	FW	1963–1964	43	—N/a	43	7
Steve Fleet	England	GK	1963–1966	96	0	96	0
Derek Mayers	England	FW	1963–1964	27	—N/a	27	3
Eddie Robertson	Scotland	FB	1963–1964	29	—N/a	29	0
Eric Johnson	England	HB	1963–1965	33	—N/a	33	0
Joe McClelland	Scotland	FB	1964–1965	38	—N/a	38	0
Graham Williams	Wales	FW	1964–1965	27	—N/a	27	7
Keith Webber	Wales	FW	1964–1966	86	0	86	36
Martyn King	England	FW	1964–1966	56	0	56	26
Ray Mielczarek	Wales	HB	1964–1967	91	0	91	0
John Smith	Wales	DF	1965–1966	25	1	26	0
Dave Campbell	Wales	MF	1965–1967	46	3	49	7
Graham Turner	England	HB	1965–1967	85	0	85	0
Alec Lucas	Wales	FB	1965–1967	59	4	63	0
David Carrick	England	FW	1966–1968	30	4	34	6
Tony McLoughlin	England	FW	1966–1967	32	2	34	13
Terry Oldfield	England	HB/FW	1966–1967	47	1	48	7
Johnny Schofield	England	GK	1966–1967	62	0	62	0
George Showell	England	DF	1966–1968	54	0	54	1
Tony Beanland	England	DF	1967–1969	97	0	97	5
Terry Bradbury	England	HB	1967–1969	89	1	90	4
Gordon Livsey	England	GK	1967–1971	90	0	90	0
Andy Provan	Scotland	MF	1970–1972	62	2	64	14
Mike McBurney	Wales	FW	1971–1973	23	6	29	7
Geoff Davies	England	FW/MF	1973–1976	80	7	87	21
Stuart Lee	England	FW	1975–1978	57	12	69	19
Steve Kenworthy	Wales	DF	1978–1981	28	1	29	1
David Giles	Wales	MF	1978–1979	50	0	50	4
Frank Jones	Wales	DF	1979–1980; 1984–1986	54	2	56	0
Terry Darracott	England	DF	1979–1980	27	0	27	0
Ian Edwards	Wales	FW	1979–1982	94	4	98	28
Phil Bater	Wales	DF	1981–1983	92	0	92	1
Billy Ronson	England	MF	1981–1982	38	1	39	3
Darren Baker	England	MF	1982–1984	21	8	29	2
Robbie Savage	England	MF	1982–1983	34	0	34	13
Stuart Parker	England	GK	1982–1985	51	0	51	0
Seamus Heath	Northern Ireland	MF	1983–1984	41	3	44	2
Steve Wright	England	DF	1983–1985	97	0	97	1
Kevin Rogers	Wales	MF	1984–1985	42	4	46	4
Mike Hooper	England	GK	1985	38	0	38	0
Nick Hencher	Wales	MF	1985–1987	36	8	44	10
Mike Conroy	Scotland	MF	1986–1987	35	2	37	3
Joe Cooke	Dominica	DF	1986–1988	68	2	70	5
Paul Emson	England	MF/FW	1986–1988	61	12	73	10
Steve Massey	England	FW	1986–1988	55	9	64	18
Chris Pearce	Wales	GK	1986–1987	41	0	41	0
Michael Carter	England	MF	1987–1989	32	14	46	8
Joe Hinnigan	England	DF	1987–1988	36	1	37	3
Ollie Kearns	England	FW	1987–1989	50	10	60	23
Graham Cooper	England	MF	1988–1990	69	22	91	21
Sean Reck	England	MF	1989–1990	54	4	58	3
Gary Worthington	England	FW	1989–1991	90	4	94	29
Andy Preece	England	FW	1990–1991	60	9	69	13
Jimmy Kelly	England	MF	1990–1992; 1994	27	13	40	0
Gordon Davies	Wales	FW	1991–1992	26	3	29	5
Kieron Durkan	England	MF	1991–1996	65	10	75	6
John Paskin	South Africa	FW	1992–1994	32	29	61	15
Mark Taylor	England	MF/FW	1992–1994	60	12	72	10
Scott Williams	Wales	DF	1992–1998	30	10	40	0
Mike Lake	England	MF	1992–1994	71	2	73	6
Stephen Morris	England	FW	1994–1997	35	21	56	12
Mark Cartwright	England	GK	1996–1999	66	0	66	0
Ian Rush	Wales	FW/MF	1998–1999	20	7	27	0
Jeff Whitley	Northern Ireland	MF	1999; 2007–2008	27	6	33	3
David Walsh	Wales	GK	1999–2002	24	2	26	0
Kristian Rogers	England	GK	2000–2003	48	1	49	0
Michael Blackwood	England	DF/MF	2000–2002	30	26	56	3
Shaun Holmes	Northern Ireland	DF	2001–2004	64	35	99	5
Daniel Bennett	Singapore	DF	2002–2003	23	6	29	0
Craig Morgan	Wales	DF	2002–2005; 2006	51	21	72	2
Paul Edwards	England	DF/MF	2002–2004	84	7	91	4
Andy Dibble	Wales	GK	2002–2005	90	0	90	0
Scott Green	England	MF	2003; 2004–2005	20	12	32	3
Michael Ingham	Northern Ireland	GK	2004; 2005–2007	96	0	96	0
Levi Mackin	Wales	MF	2004–2008	40	37	77	2
Andy Holt	England	DF	2004–2006	97	1	98	10
Alex Smith	England	DF/MF	2004–2006	42	14	56	0
Dean Bennett	England	MF	2004–2006	36	22	58	2
Juan Ugarte	Spain	FW	2004–2005; 2006–2007	33	14	47	27
Ben Foster	England	GK	2005; 2023	35	0	35	0
David Bayliss	England	DF	2005–2006	25	1	26	0
Lee McEvilly	Northern Ireland	FW	2005–2007	36	20	56	16
Jonathan Walters	Republic of Ireland	FW	2005–2006	38	6	44	7
Matt Done	England	MF/FW	2005–2008	49	26	75	2
Steve Evans	Wales	DF	2006–2009	88	5	93	7
Ryan Valentine	Wales	DF	2006–2008	55	2	57	2
Josh Johnson	Trinidad and Tobago	MF	2006–2007	13	23	36	1
Gareth Evans	Wales	DF	2006–2008	20	9	29	0
Andrew Fleming	England	MF	2007–2010	70	6	76	1
Michael Proctor	England	FW	2007–2009	44	29	73	15
Anthony Williams	Wales	GK	2007–2009	39	0	39	0
Richard Hope	England	DF	2007–2008	36	0	36	0
Neil Taylor	Wales	DF	2007–2010	70	18	88	3
Silvio Spann	Trinidad and Tobago	MF	2007–2010	45	14	59	1
Sam Aiston	England	MF	2007–2009	25	17	42	0
Wes Baynes	England	DF	2007–2010	57	30	87	12
Gavin Ward	England	GK	2008–2009	63	0	63	0
Carl Tremarco	England	DF	2008–2009	29	0	29	0
Jefferson Louis	Dominica	FW	2008–2009	43	5	48	18
Christian Smith	England	MF	2008–2010	37	14	51	7
Ashley Westwood	England	DF	2008–2010	73	0	73	4
Nathan Fairhurst	England	MF	2008–2010	26	10	36	3
Kai Edwards	Wales	DF	2008–2011; 2016	24	4	28	1
Jonathan Brown	Wales	MF	2008–2009	22	5	27	4
Sam Williamson	England	DF	2008–2009	30	4	34	0
Ryan Flynn	Scotland	MF	2008–2009	24	4	28	4
Mansour Assoumani	France	DF	2009–2010	45	1	46	1
Gareth Taylor	Wales	FW	2009–2011	50	17	67	16
Frank Sinclair	Jamaica	DF	2009–2011	60	3	63	0
Andy Mangan	England	FW	2010–2011	66	3	69	23
Declan Walker	England	DF	2010–2013	25	7	32	1
Chris Blackburn	England	DF	2010–2011	46	0	46	1
Nathaniel Knight-Percival	England	DF	2010–2012	64	22	86	9
Jamie Tolley	Wales	MF	2010–2012	51	18	69	11
Marvin Andrews	Trinidad and Tobago	DF	2010–2011	22	10	32	2
Mathias Pogba	Guinea	FW	2010–2012	53	22	75	16
Mark Creighton	England	DF	2010–2013	82	4	86	4
Lee Fowler	Wales	MF	2011; 2015–2016	37	19	56	6
Joslain Mayebi	Cameroon	GK	2011–2014	91	0	91	0
Steve Tomassen	England	DF	2011–2015	51	12	63	2
Jake Speight	England	FW	2011–2012	38	7	45	21
Danny Wright	England	FW	2011–2013	74	12	86	25
Glen Little	England	MF	2011–2013	6	37	43	2
Chris Westwood	England	DF	2011–2013	57	2	59	3
Leon Clowes	England	DF	2011–2014	21	4	25	2
Stephen Wright	England	DF	2012–2014	63	3	66	1
Rob Ogleby	Wales	FW	2012–2014	35	41	76	16
Brett Ormerod	England	FW	2012–2014	65	21	86	15
Martin Riley	England	DF	2012–2013; 2016–2017	73	3	76	0
Andy Bishop	England	FW	2012–2015	76	23	99	26
Andy Coughlin	England	GK	2012–2015	76	1	77	0
David Artell	Gibraltar	DF	2013–2014	40	2	42	3
Joe Anyinsah	England	FW	2013–2014	25	10	35	4
Theo Bailey-Jones	England	MF	2013–2015	12	21	33	0
Elliott Durrell	England	MF	2014–2015; 2020–2021	43	22	65	6
Blaine Hudson	England	DF	2014–2016	77	7	84	7
Louis Moult	England	FW	2014–2015	39	12	51	23
Wes York	England	MF/FW	2014–2016	68	31	99	19
Jamal Fyfield	England	DF	2015–2016	44	2	46	0
James Gray	Northern Ireland	FW	2015–2016	17	13	30	7
Kayden Jackson	England	FW/MF	2015–2016	18	20	38	4
Adriano Moke	Portugal	MF	2015–2016	28	6	34	0
Sean Newton	England	DF	2015–2016	66	0	66	9
Dominic Vose	England	MF	2015–2016	29	2	31	11
Rhys Taylor	Wales	GK	2015–2016	29	0	29	0
Anthony Barry	England	MF	2016–2017	27	8	35	2
Hamza Bencherif	Algeria	DF/MF	2016–2017	26	2	28	2
Chris Dunn	England	GK	2016–2018	53	2	55	0
Jordan Evans	Wales	MF	2016–2017	23	2	25	1
Callum Powell	England	FW	2016–2017	7	19	26	2
John Rooney	England	MF	2016–2017	32	4	36	11
Shwan Jalal	England	GK	2016–2017	27	0	27	0
Curtis Tilt	Jamaica	DF	2016–2017	38	0	38	1
Leo Smith	Wales	MF	2016–2017	17	12	29	1
Rekeil Pyke	England	FW/MF	2016; 2018–2019	16	14	30	5
Jordan White	Scotland	FW	2016–2017	17	8	25	7
Ntumba Massanka	England	FW	2017	20	23	43	7
Scott Boden	England	FW	2017–2018	25	11	36	3
Chris Holroyd	England	FW	2017–2019	48	17	65	17
Marcus Kelly	England	MF	2017–2018	43	1	44	2
Jack Mackreth	England	MF	2017–2018	9	26	35	0
Kevin Roberts	England	DF	2017–2019	76	3	79	0
Sam Wedgbury	England	MF	2017–2018	42	0	42	1
Christian Dibble	Wales	GK	2017–2022	68	4	72	0
Nicky Deverdics	England	MF	2018–2019	14	13	27	2
Stuart Beavon	England	FW	2018–2019	33	13	46	6
Mike Fondop	Cameroon	FW	2018	15	11	26	6
Luke Summerfield	England	MF	2018–2020	67	7	74	4
Jake Lawlor	England	DF	2018–2020	76	0	76	1
Brad Walker	England	MF	2018–2019	31	1	32	4
Bobby Grant	England	FW	2018–2020	46	4	50	10
Ben Tollitt	England	MF/FW	2018–2019; 2019	18	13	31	5
Jason Oswell	England	FW	2019–2020	18	20	38	3
Kieran Kennedy	England	DF	2019; 2019–2020	26	3	29	3
Mark Harris	Wales	MF/FW	2019–2020	14	14	28	3
Devonte Redmond	England	MF	2019–2021	22	10	32	3
Jake Bickerstaff	England	FW	2019–2026	15	13	28	6
Dan Jarvis	England	MF	2020–2022	24	29	53	3
Jordan Ponticelli	England	FW	2020–2022	29	36	65	11
Reece Hall-Johnson	England	DF	2020–2023	68	9	77	13
Fiacre Kelleher	Republic of Ireland	DF	2020–2021	41	1	42	0
Jamie Reckord	England	DF	2020–2021	48	0	48	3
Kwame Thomas	Saint Kitts and Nevis	FW	2020–2022	31	7	38	11
Theo Vassell	England	DF	2020–2021	31	0	31	4
Dior Angus	England	FW	2021–2022	26	20	46	7
Tyler French	England	DF	2021–2022	35	7	42	0
Aaron Hayden	England	DF	2021–2024	93	1	94	20
Liam McAlinden	Republic of Ireland	FW	2021–2023	27	37	64	1
Bryce Hosannah	England	DF	2021–2023	33	13	46	2
Callum McFadzean	Scotland	DF	2022–2024	48	9	57	0
Anthony Forde	Republic of Ireland	DF/MF	2022–2025	49	12	61	4
Mark Howard	England	GK	2022–2025	56	4	60	0
Jacob Mendy	Gambia	DF/MF	2022–2026	55	23	78	6
Sam Dalby	England	FW	2022–2025	37	54	91	13
Jordan Tunnicliffe	England	DF	2022–2024	36	5	41	2
Andy Cannon	England	MF	2022–2026	75	13	88	12
Eoghan O'Connell	Republic of Ireland	DF	2023–2025	86	5	91	2
Will Boyle	England	DF	2023–2025	27	4	31	6
George Evans	England	MF/DF	2023–2025	33	12	45	0
Steven Fletcher	Scotland	FW	2023–2025	13	64	77	16
Jack Marriott	England	FW	2024–2025	14	34	48	7
**Sebastian Revan**	England	MF/DF	2024–	15	12	27	1
Lewis Brunt	England	DF	2024–2026	34	7	41	1
**Oliver Rathbone**	England	MF	2024–	62	30	92	18
Dan Scarr	England	DF	2024–2026	37	7	44	0
**Matty James**	England	MF	2024–	64	20	84	3
**Ryan Longman**	England	MF/DF	2025–	45	26	71	3
Jay Rodriguez	England	FW	2025–2026	17	9	26	2
**Sam Smith**	England	FW	2025–	46	34	80	18
**Kieffer Moore**	Wales	FW	2025–	43	16	59	17
**Lewis O'Brien**	England	MF	2025–	43	17	60	5
**Josh Windass**	England	MF	2025–	33	19	52	17
**Nathan Broadhead**	Wales	FW	2025–	27	18	45	8
**Callum Doyle**	England	DF	2025–	52	2	54	4
**Ben Sheaf**	England	MF	2025–	27	8	35	0
**Dominic Hyam**	Scotland	DF	2025–	56	1	57	1
**Issa Kaboré**	Burkina Faso	DF	2025–	35	10	45	0
**George Thomason**	England	MF	2025–	37	8	45	2
