= 1920 in association football =

The following are the football (soccer) events of the year 1920 throughout the world.

== Winners club national championship ==
- Argentina: Boca Juniors, River Plate
- Austria: Rapid Vienna
- Belgium: Club Brugge
- Denmark: B 1903
- England: Liverpool F.C.
- France: no national championship
- Germany: 1. FC Nürnberg
- Hungary: MTK Hungária FC
- Iceland: Víkingur
- Italy: Internazionale Milano F.C.
- Luxembourg: CS Fola Esch
- Netherlands: Be Quick
- Paraguay: Club Libertad
- Poland: not finished due to Polish-Soviet War; most probably champions would have been Cracovia
- Scotland: For fuller coverage, see 1919-20 in Scottish football.
  - Scottish Division One – Rangers
  - Scottish Cup – Kilmarnock
- Sweden: Djurgårdens IF
- Uruguay: Nacional
- Greece: 1913 to 1921 - no championship titles due to the First World War and the Greco-Turkish War of 1919-1922.

== International tournaments ==
- 1920 British Home Championship (October 25, 1919 – April 10, 1920)

Wales

- Olympic Games in Antwerp, Belgium (August 28 – September 2, 1920)
  1. Belgium
  2. Spain
  3. Netherlands
- South American Championship 1920 in Chile (September 11, 1920 – October 3, 1920)

Uruguay

== Births ==
- January 15 – Anton Malatinský, Slovak international football player and coach (died 1992)
- January 31 – Bert Williams, English international goalkeeper (died 2014)
- March 3
  - Elio Bianchi, retired Italian professional footballer
  - Jesse McLarty, Scottish professional footballer (died 2001)
- April 14 – Schubert Gambetta, Uruguayan international footballer (died 1991)
- June 26 – Ernst Melchior, Austrian international footballer (died 1978)
- July 2 – Laurie Nevins, English professional footballer (died 1972)
- August 31 – Walter Atkinson, English professional footballer (died 2009)
- November 7 – Ignacio Eizaguirre, Spanish international footballer (died 2013)
- November 22 – Frank Mouncer, English professional footballer (died 1977)
- December 5 – Fred Bett, English professional footballer (died 2005)

== Clubs founded ==
- Cagliari Calcio
- Empoli FC
