= Peter Fisher =

Peter Fisher may refer to:

- Peter Fisher (photojournalist) (1929–2013), Hungarian-born cinematographer and photojournalist
- Peter Fisher (actor) (born 1954), Australian film and television actor
- Peter Fisher (politician) (born 1936), member of the Australian House of Representatives
- Peter Fisher (1930s footballer), Scottish professional association footballer
- Peter Fisher (footballer, born 1920) (1920–2010), Scottish footballer
- Peter Fisher (activist) (1944–2012), American author and gay rights activist
- Peter Fisher (historian) (1782–1848), Canadian historian
- Peter Fisher (physician) (1950–2018), British physician
- Peter Fisher (Puritan) (fl. 1626–1657), Puritan politician active in Ipswich, Suffolk, England
- Peter Fisher (priest) (1944-2026), Anglican priest
- Peter Fisher (translator) (born 1934), British academic, known for translating Gesta Danorum
- Peter R. Fisher (born 1956), U.S. Under Secretary of the Treasury
- Peter H. Fisher (born 1959), American physicist

== See also ==
- Peter Fischer (disambiguation)
