= James Pugh =

James Pugh may refer to:

- James L. Pugh (1820–1907), U.S. senator from Alabama
- James Pugh (footballer) (1891–?), English footballer
- James E. Pugh (born 1950), American trombonist and composer
- Jim Pugh (born 1964), American tennis player
- J. A. Pugh (1833–1887), American photographer
