= Leslie Murphy =

Leslie Murphy may refer to:

- Leslie Murphy (businessman) (1915 - 2007), British businessman
- Leslie Murphy (footballer)
