= David Richards =

David Richards may refer to:

== Sports ==
- David Richards (American football) (born 1966), NFL offensive lineman
- David Richards (athlete), Welsh runner
- David Richards (cricket administrator), Australian, former CEO of the ICC
- David Richards (cricketer) (1931–2017), English cricketer
- David Richards (footballer, born 1910), Welsh footballer
- David Richards (footballer, born 1896) (1896–1971), English footballer
- David Richards (motorsport executive) (born 1952), Welsh chairman of Prodrive and Aston Martin
- David Richards (rugby union, born 1954), Wales and British Lions international
- David Richards (rugby union, born 1999), Welsh rugby union player
- Dave Richards (born 1943), English chairman of the FA Premier League
- Dave Richards (footballer, born 1993), Welsh football goalkeeper
- Davey Richards (born 1983), American wrestler

== Others ==
- David Richards, Baron Richards of Herstmonceux (born 1952), British Army officer, former Chief of the Defence Staff
- David Richards (Dafydd Ionawr) (1751–1827), Welsh-language poet
- David Richards (judge) (born 1951), British judge
- David Richards (record producer) (1956–2013), British producer of records by Queen and David Bowie
- David Richards (sculptor) (1829–1897), Welsh sculptor who moved to the United States; known for work at Black Hawk Museum and Lodge
- David Richards (writer), theater critic for The Washington Post, novelist
- David Adams Richards (born 1950), Canadian writer and Senator
- David E. Richards (1921–2018), American prelate of the Episcopal church, bishop of Albany, New York
- David James Richards (born 1970), British entrepreneur, co-founder of WANdisco
- David L. Richards (born 1968), American social scientist, co-director of the CIRI Human Rights Data Project
- David A. J. Richards (born 1944), American constitutional lawyer and moral philosopher
