= Cyril Jones =

Cyril Jones may refer to:

- Cyril Lloyd Jones (1881–1981), English railway engineer
- Cyril Jones (footballer) (1920–1995), Welsh footballer
