= Stanley Roberts (disambiguation) =

Stanley Roberts (born 1970) is a basketball player.

Stanley Roberts may also refer to:

- Stanley Roberts (screenwriter) (1916–1982)
- Stan Roberts (1927–1990), Canadian politician
- Stan Roberts (footballer) (1921–1995), Welsh footballer
- Edward Stanley Roberts (1890–1964), English cricket player

== See also ==
- Robert Stanley (disambiguation)
