= Peter Fischer =

Peter Fischer may refer to:

- Peter Fischer (skier) (born 1954), German former alpine skier
- Peter Fischer (politician) (born 1958), Minnesota politician
- Peter M. Fischer, Austrian-Swedish archaeologist
- Peter S. Fischer (1935–2023), American writer and television producer

== See also ==
- Peter Fisher (disambiguation)
