= Robert Stanley =

Robert Stanley may refer to:

- Robert Stanley (MP) (died 1632), member of parliament (MP) for Lancashire
- Robert Christopher Stafford Stanley (1899–1983), governor of the Solomon Islands (1953–1955)
- Robert H. Stanley (1881–1942), American sailor and Medal of Honor recipient
- Robert Stanley (aviator) (1912–1977), American test pilot and engineer
- Robert Crooks Stanley (1876-1951), American metallurgist and industrialist
- Robert C. Stanley (1918–1996), American artist known for his paperback book covers
- Bob Stanley (baseball) (born 1954), American baseball pitcher
- Bob Stanley (musician) (born 1964), British musician
- Mike Stanley (Robert Michael Stanley, born 1963), American baseball catcher
- Robert Stanley (Australian politician) (1847–1918), Australian politician
- Robert Stanley (mayor) (1828–1911), British mayor and businessman

== See also ==
- Robert de Stanley, Roman Catholic vicar of Aylesbury in 1348
- Stanley Roberts (disambiguation)
