= Eric Stubbs =

English footballer

Personal information
- Full name: Philip Eric Gordon Stubbs
- Date of birth: 10 September 1912
- Place of birth: Chester, Cheshire, England
- Date of death: 25 January 2013 (aged 100)
- Place of death: Chester, England
- Height: 5 ft 11 in (1.80 m)
- Position: Winger

Senior career*
Years	Team	Apps	(Gls)
- Winsford United
- Nantwich Town
1934	Bolton Wanderers	0	(0)
1934–1935	Wrexham	28	(10)
1935–1936	Nottingham Forest	22	(6)
1936–1939	Leicester City	74	(14)
1945–1946	Chester	0	(0)
- * Club domestic league appearances and goals

Philip Eric Gordon Stubbs (10 September 1912 – 25 January 2013) was an English professional football who played as a winger. He played in the Football League for Bolton Wanderers, Wrexham, Nottingham Forest, Leicester City and Chester City.

His final pre-war club was Leicester City, for which he made his highest number of appearances, helping guide them to the First Division. After the war, he returned to his hometown Chester where he joined Chester City.

He was the first and, as of 2018, only Leicester City player to live to the age of 100.
