= Colin Stockton =

English footballer

Personal information
- Full name: Colin Moffat Stockton
- Date of birth: 19 July 1881
- Place of birth: Ellesmere Port, Cheshire, England
- Date of death: 1931 (aged 49–50)
- Position: Outside right

Senior career*
Years	Team	Apps	(Gls)
- Ellesmere Port Town
- Melrose
1905–1908	Wrexham	66	(10)
1908	Chester City		
1908–1909	Chelsea	0	(0)
1909–1910	Leeds City	3	(0)
- * Club domestic league appearances and goals

Colin Moffat Stockton (19 July 1881 – 1931) was an English professional footballer who played as an outside right. He made appearances in the English Football League for Leeds City.
