= Alf Pritchard =

English footballer

Personal information
- Full name: Alfred Vincent Pritchard
- Date of birth: 31 August 1920
- Place of birth: Chester, England
- Date of death: 9 May 1995 (aged 74)
- Place of death: Chester, England
- Position: Inside forward

Senior career*
Years	Team	Apps	(Gls)
- Chester City
1937–1939	Millwall	0	(0)
- Dumbarton
1946–1950	Wrexham	36	(8)
- Macclesfield Town
- * Club domestic league appearances and goals

Alfred Vincent Pritchard (31 August 1920 – 9 May 1995) was an English professional footballer who played as an inside forward. He made appearances in the English Football League for Wrexham.
