= J. A. Pugh =

American photographer

James Adolphus Pugh
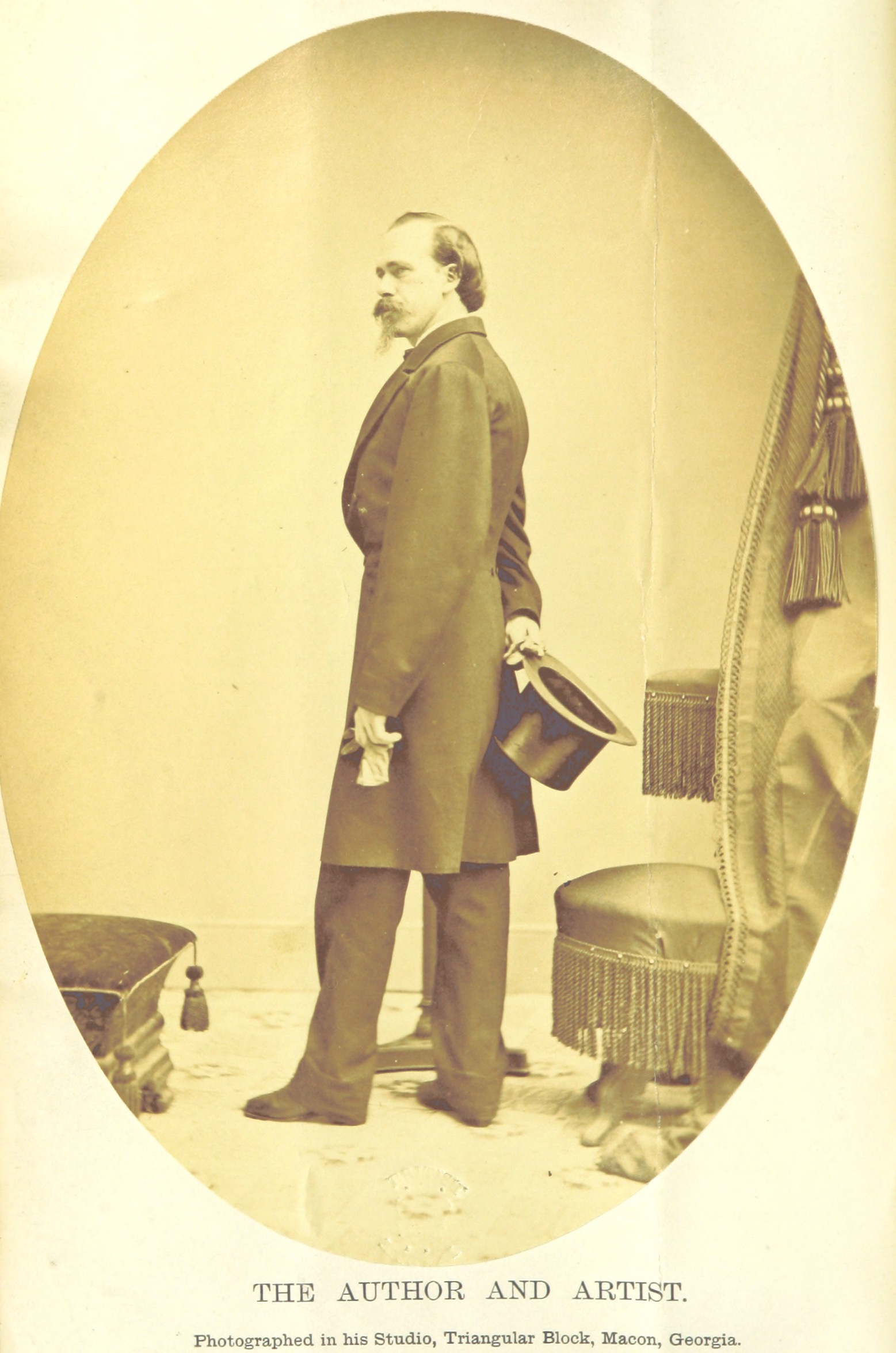
- Self portrait albumen print of Pugh in his book Leaves of a Wanderer
- Born: July 3, 1833
- Died: January 22, 1887 (aged 53)

James Adolphus Pugh (July 3, 1833 – January 22, 1887) was an American photographer, based in Macon, Georgia, at the time of the Civil War. Pugh trained with and eventually took over the studio of R. L. Wood. His studio specialized in providing photographs of soldiers going to war. His studio was called Pugh's Photograph and Fine Art Gallery and printed ambrotype, tintype and daguerreotype photographs.

Pugh sailed to Europe in 1867 in order to attend the International Exposition and wrote a book about his European travels. In it, he spoke of how he "[held] it to be a duty every man owes to his family, to have both his and their likenesses taken at least once a year." His studio featured sinks with running water to make sure his prints had as much of the salts washed off of them as possible. In addition, he featured scenery backdrops painted by artists in New York City and an art gallery of photographs and paintings in his studio. Later in his career Pugh took up painting himself, creating life sized portraits of people from ambrotypes he'd taken of them.

In 1873, he won Best Photograph, Best Photograph in Oil, Best Photograph in Pastel, and Best Collection of Photographs at the Georgia State Fair.

== Personal life ==
Pugh was born in 1833, one of twelve children of Jesse and Nancy Reece Pugh. His brother David worked with him at his business.
