= John Settle (footballer) =

English footballer (1895–?)

Personal information
- Full name: John Arthur Frederick Settle
- Date of birth: 1895
- Place of birth: Chester, Cheshire, England
- Position: Left back

Senior career*
Years	Team	Apps	(Gls)
1920–1921	Chester City		
1921–1923	Wrexham	24	(0)
1923–1924	Bangor City		
1924–1925	Chester City		
1925–1926	Holywell United		
1926–1927	Caernarfon Athletic		
1927–1928	Rhyl Athletic		
- * Club domestic league appearances and goals

John Arthur Frederick Settle (born 1895) was an English professional footballer who played as a left back. He made appearances in the English Football League for Wrexham.
