= Tom Hewitt (footballer) =

Welsh footballer

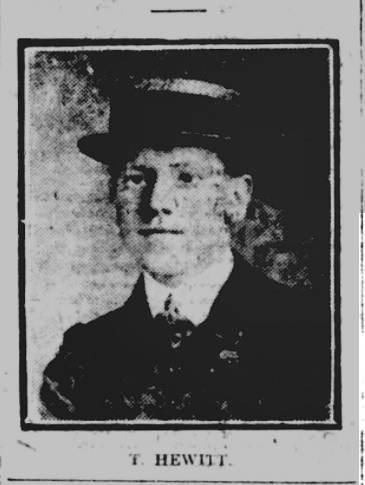
- Tom Hewitt in 1910

Personal information
- Full name: Thomas John Hewitt
- Date of birth: 26 April 1889
- Place of birth: Connah's Quay, Flintshire, Wales
- Date of death: 1980 (aged 90–91)
- Place of death: South Glamorgan, Wales
- Height: 5 ft 9 in (1.75 m)
- Position: Half-back

Youth career
- -1907: Sandycroft Artillery
- 1907-1908: Connah's Quay Victoria

Senior career*
Years	Team	Apps	(Gls)
1908–1909	Connah's Quay & Shotton		
1909–1910	Saltney		
1910–1911	Wrexham	27	(0)
1911–1913	Chelsea	8	(0)
1913–1914	South Liverpool		
1914–????	Swansea Town		

International career
1911–1914	Wales	8	(0)

Managerial career
- 1922: Aberaman Athletic Club
- * Club domestic league appearances and goals

Tom Hewitt (26 April 1889 – 1980) was a Welsh international footballer. He was part of the Wales national football team between 1911 and 1914, playing 8 matches. He played his first match on 28 January 1911 against Ireland and his last match on 16 March 1914 against England. At club level, he played for Wrexham and Chelsea.

== Club career ==
Tom Hewitt first started playing football at the age of 11 for Hawarden County Schools. Upon leaving school he joined Sandycroft where he won his first honours, the Chester & District League. The following season he joined Connah's Quay Victoria where he won the Chester & District League again, and the Chester Charity Cup. He also won the Denbighshire & Flintshire Charity Cup with Connah's Quay & Shotton.

Hewitt signed as a Professional with Saltney in 1908 and was part of the team who were runners up in The Combination in 1908–09 and 1909–10. At the start of the 1910–11 season he signed for Wrexham.

He moved to Chelsea in December 1911 who paid a fee of £800 for him. He left Chelsea following a bad injury and signed for Swansea Town in 1914 following a spell at South Liverpool.

He was forced to give up football due to an injury sustained in his work as an engineer. He later became manager of Aberaman.

== Personal life ==
Upon leaving school Hewitt was an apprentice engineer in Sandycroft. He was a teetotaller and a non-smoker.

His brother was former Cardiff City goalkeeper Charles Hewitt.

== See also ==
- List of Wales international footballers (alphabetical)
