= Stuart Parker (footballer, born 1963) =

English footballer

Personal information
- Full name: Stuart Kevin Parker
- Date of birth: 13 April 1963 (age 63)
- Place of birth: Nantwich, England
- Position: Goalkeeper

Youth career
- Wrexham

Senior career*
Years	Team	Apps	(Gls)
1981–1985	Wrexham	31	(0)
1985–1986	Oswestry Town		
1986	Mold Alexandra		
1986–1987	Oswestry Town		
1987	Brymbo Steelworks		
1988–1993	Lex XI		
1993–1996	Brymbo		

Managerial career
- 1995–1996: Brymbo
- * Club domestic league appearances and goals

Stuart Kevin Parker (born 13 April 1963) is an English former professional footballer who played as a goalkeeper. He made appearances in the English Football League with Wrexham in the 1980s. Later in life he became Santa.
