= Elio Bianchi =

Italian footballer (born 1920)

Personal information
- Date of birth: 3 March 1920
- Place of birth: Rome, Kingdom of Italy
- Position: Striker

Senior career*
Years	Team	Apps	(Gls)
1938–1939	Roma	1	(0)
1939–1940	Rimini	22	(17)
1941–1943	Alba Roma		
1943–1944	Avia Roma	6	(3)
- * Club domestic league appearances and goals

Elio Bianchi (born 3 March 1920) is an Italian retired professional football player. He was born in Rome.

He played one game in the Serie A in the 1938/39 season for A.S. Roma.

== See also ==
- List of football clubs in Italy
