= Frank Mouncer =

English footballer

Personal information
- Full name: Frank Edmund Mouncer
- Date of birth: 22 November 1920
- Place of birth: Grimsby, England
- Date of death: 1977 (aged 56–57)
- Position: Full-back

Senior career*
Years	Team	Apps	(Gls)
1935	Humber United		
1935–1949	Grimsby Town	22	(0)
- * Club domestic league appearances and goals

Frank Edmund Mouncer (22 November 1920 – 1977) was an English professional footballer who played as a full-back.
