= Walter Atkinson =

English footballer

Walter Atkinson (31 August 1920 – June 2009) was a professional footballer who played as a wing-half.

He made a single appearance for Norwich City on 2 April 1952 against Southend United at Carrow Road, playing at right-half. He had previously played for Hexham Hearts.

== Bibliography ==
- Davage, Mark; Eastwood, John; Platt, Kevin (2001). Canary Citizens. Jarrold Publishing. ISBN 0-7117-2020-7.
