= Stephen Morris (footballer, born 1976) =

English footballer

Personal information
- Date of birth: 13 May 1976 (age 50)
- Place of birth: Liverpool, England
- Position: Forward

Youth career
- Liverpool

Senior career*
Years	Team	Apps	(Gls)
1994–1997	Wrexham	42	(9)
1997	→ Rochdale (loan)	0	(0)
1998	Southport	1	(0)
1999–2000	Chelmsford City		
- * Club domestic league appearances and goals

Stephen Morris (born 13 May 1976) is an English former professional footballer who made a majority of his appearances in the English Football League with Wrexham.

== Career ==
Morris was signed by Wrexham for free from Liverpool's academy. He made 42 appearances in the football league for Wrexham between 1994 and 1997. During this time he was loaned to Rochdale.

He left Wrexham in 1997, signing for Southport but only played one game for the Conference side. In December 1999, Morris signed for Chelmsford City, and at the end of the season, Morris left Chelmsford.
