= Ralph Burkinshaw =

English footballer

Personal information
- Date of birth: 26 March 1898
- Place of birth: Kilnhurst, England
- Date of death: June 1951 (aged 53)
- Height: 5 ft 7 1/2 in (1.71 m)
- Positions: Inside forward; right half

Youth career
- 1914: Barnsley

Senior career*
Years	Team	Apps	(Gls)
1919	South Shields	2	(0)
1920	Northampton Town	0	(0)
1920	Gainsborough Trinity		
1920–1925	Bury	104	(20)
1925–1930	Bradford City	166	(30)
1930–1932	Wrexham	64	(1)
1932–1933	Scarborough		
1933–1936	Mexborough Athletic		
- Denaby United
- * Club domestic league appearances and goals

Ralph Burkinshaw (26 March 1898 – June 1951) was an English professional footballer who played for a number of clubs.

== Career ==
Burkinshaw had guested for a number of South Yorkshire clubs during First World War football, before starting his full career at South Shields in 1919. He played just two games at South Shields during the club's first season in Division Two before having brief spells at Northampton Town and Gainsborough Trinity. In November 1920 he signed for Bury where he spent nearly five years, including 13 games in Division One during his 1924–25 benefit season.

In July 1925 he signed for Bradford City as an inside forward although he spent much of his Bradford career as a right half. He also spent five seasons at Bradford, including being top scorer with 12 league goals and two FA Cup goals in the 1927–28 season and being an ever-present in the club's 1928–29 title-winning season in Division Three (North). He signed for Wrexham in July 1930, winning a Welsh Cup in his first season and later served as assistant manager. He left Wrexham to finish his career in non-league, with first Scarborough, then Mexborough Athletic and finally Denaby United.

He was also a useful batsman in Yorkshire league cricket.

Burkinshaw died in June 1951.

== Honours ==
Bradford City

- Football League Third Division North: 1928–29

Wrexham

- Welsh Cup: 1931
