= Fred Bett =

English footballer

Personal information
- Full name: Frederick Bett
- Date of birth: 5 December 1920
- Place of birth: Scunthorpe, England
- Date of death: 2005 (aged 84–85)
- Position: Inside forward

Youth career
- 1936–193: Scunthorpe & Lindsey United

Senior career*
Years	Team	Apps	(Gls)
1937–1946	Sunderland	3	(0)
1946–1948	Coventry City	27	(11)
1948–1950	Lincoln City	14	(2)
1950–1951	Spalding United		
1951–1952	Holbeach United		
1952–195?	Bourne Town		
- * Club domestic league appearances and goals

Frederick Bett (5 December 1920 – 2005) was an English professional footballer who played as an inside forward for Sunderland.
