= Vic Evans (footballer) =

English footballer

Personal information
- Full name: Arthur Victor Evans
- Date of birth: 1918
- Place of birth: Mold, Flintshire
- Height: 5 ft 10 in (1.78 m)
- Position: Right-back

Senior career*
Years	Team	Apps	(Gls)
- Llanerch Celts
1934–1938	Wrexham	84	(0)
- * Club domestic league appearances and goals

Arthur Victor Evans (1918 – date of death unknown) was a Welsh professional football who played as a defender. He made 84 appearances in the English Football League for Wrexham in the 1930s.
