= Laurie Nevins =

English footballer

Personal information
- Full name: Laurence Nevins
- Date of birth: 2 July 1920
- Place of birth: Gateshead, England
- Date of death: June 1972 (aged 51)
- Place of death: Gateshead, England
- Height: 5 ft 6 in (1.68 m)
- Position: Outside left

Senior career*
| Years | Team | Apps | (Gls) |
| 1939–1947 | Newcastle United | 0 | (0) |
| 1947–1948 | Brighton & Hove Albion | 5 | (0) |
| 1948–1949 | Hartlepools United | 18 | (8) |
- * Club domestic league appearances and goals

Laurence Nevins (2 July 1920 – June 1972) was an English professional footballer who played as an outside left in the Football League for Brighton & Hove Albion and Hartlepools United. He joined Newcastle United in 1939 as an amateur, and turned professional in 1940, but never made a peacetime appearance. During the Second World War, he made guest appearances for Middlesbrough and Queens Park Rangers, and played regularly for Dundee United in the Scottish wartime competitions while serving in the Royal Navy as a submariner.
