= Mike McBurney =

Welsh footballer

Personal information
- Full name: Michael Leslie McBurney
- Date of birth: 12 September 1953 (age 73)
- Place of birth: Wrexham, Wales
- Position: Forward

Senior career*
Years	Team	Apps	(Gls)
1970–1973	Wrexham	24	(4)
1973–1975	Bolton Wanderers	1	(0)
1974	→ Hartlepool United (loan)	6	(1)
1975	→ Tranmere Rovers (loan)	5	(0)
- Blaenau Ffestiniog
Total		36	(5)
- * Club domestic league appearances and goals

Mike McBurney (born 12 September 1953) is a Welsh footballer, who played as a forward in the Football League for Tranmere Rovers.

== Career ==
=== Club ===
Club	Season
Wrexam AFC	1972/73
Bolton Wanderers	1973/74
