= Alf Sheldon =

English footballer

Personal information
- Full name: Alfred Sheldon
- Place of birth: Smethwick, England
- Position: Winger

Senior career*
Years	Team	Apps	(Gls)
1911–1912	Rowley United		
1912–1913	Coombs Wood		
1913–1914	Worcester City		
1914	Dudley Town		
1919–1920	Coventry City	14	(1)
1920–1922	Wellington		
1922–1923	Wrexham	39	(5)
1923–1924	Wellington		
1924–1925	Shrewsbury Town		
1925	Redditch Town		
- * Club domestic league appearances and goals

Alfred Sheldon was an English professional footballer. He played in the English Football League for Coventry City and Wrexham. He also played for Worcester City, Dudley Town, Wellington, Shrewsbury Town and Redditch Town.
