= Peter H. Fisher =

American physicist and professor

- Born: 1959 (age 66–67); San Francisco, California
- Scientific career
- Workplaces: Johns Hopkins University; Massachusetts Institute of Technology
- Thesis: A search for double beta decay in ^{76}Ge
- Doctoral advisor: Felix H. Boehm

Peter H. Fisher (born 1959) is an American experimental particle physicist, as well as the Thomas A. Frank (1977) Professor of Physics and the former head of the Department of Physics at the Massachusetts Institute of Technology. He is a Fellow of the American Physical Society.

== Early life and education ==
Peter Fisher was born in 1959 in San Francisco, California.

He earned a B.S. in engineering physics at the University of California, Berkeley, in 1983, and a Ph.D. in nuclear physics at the California Institute of Technology in 1988. His dissertation, A search for double beta decay in ^{76}Ge, was supervised by Felix H. Boehm.

== Career ==
From 1989 to 1994, Fisher was on the faculty of Johns Hopkins University. He joined the M.I.T. faculty in 1989, and became a full professor in 2001.

Fisher's research has included twelve years at CERN working on the Alpha Magnetic Spectrometer for the International Space Station. His research interests also include the detection of dark matter, development of new particle detectors, compact energy supplies, and wireless energy transmission. He released his first book What is Dark Matter? in 2022, synthesizing his own and peers' research into the topic.

He was chair of the MIT Department of Physics from 2014 to 2022. He became the first Head of the MIT Office of Research Computing and Data (ORCD) in 2022. He is a member of JASON (advisory group).

On February 8, 2008, Fisher appeared on Late Night with Conan O'Brien, where he helped O'Brien improve his wedding-ring spinning record to 51 seconds.

== Awards ==
Fisher became a Fellow of the American Physical Society, nominated by the Division of Particles and Fields in 2006, and cited, For initiating Tau Polarization Asymmetry Measurements and W-Boson self couplings, leading to a top mass prediction (found later at FNAL). First proof of single W-production in e+ e- annihilation. Determination of sin20w with proposal to expand to highest accuracy of 10-5 at LHC. He was named a fellow for the American Association for the Advancement of Science in 2020.

== See also ==
- List of fellows of the American Physical Society (1998–2010)
