= Tom Parker (footballer, born 1893) =

English footballer

Personal information
- Full name: Thomas Blood Parker
- Date of birth: 1893
- Place of birth: Fenton, England
- Position: Centre half

Senior career*
Years	Team	Apps	(Gls)
- Carr Vale
1914	The Wednesday	0	(0)
- Bolsover Colliery
1919–1923	Luton Town	76	(0)
1923–1925	Portsmouth	43	(1)
1925–1926	Wrexham	34	(2)
- * Club domestic league appearances and goals

Thomas Blood Parker was an English professional footballer who played as a centre half in the Football League for Portsmouth, Luton Town and Wrexham. He captained Luton Town.

== Personal life ==
During the First World War, Parker served as a driver in the Army Service Corps and as a gunner in the Royal Field Artillery.

== Career statistics ==
Appearances and goals by club, season and competition
Club	Season	League			FA Cup		Other		Total	
Club	Season	Division	Apps	Goals	Apps	Goals	Apps	Goals	Apps	Goals
Luton Town	1919–20	Southern League First Division	40	0	4	1	―		44	1
Luton Town	1920–21	Third Division	35	0	4	0	―		39	0
Luton Town	1921–22	Third Division South	1	0	0	0	―		1	0
Luton Town	Total		76	0	8	1	―		84	1
Portsmouth	1922–23	Third Division South	12	1	―		―		12	1
Portsmouth	1923–24	Third Division South	30	0	4	0	―		34	0
Portsmouth	1924–25	Second Division	1	0	0	0	―		1	0
Portsmouth	Total		43	1	4	0	―		47	1
Wrexham	1925–26	Third Division North	34	1	1	0	1 (Note: Appearance in Welsh Cup)	0	36	1
Career total			153	2	13	1	1	0	166	3

== Honours ==
Portsmouth

- Football League Third Division South: 1923–24
