= James Pugh (footballer) =

English footballer

James Pugh (born July 1891, date of death unknown) was an English footballer. His regular position was at full back. He was born in Hereford, Herefordshire. He played for Manchester United, Clapton Orient, Coventry City, Luton Town, Brighton & Hove Albion, Hereford United, Bridgend Town, Abertillery and Wrexham.
