= Jesse McLarty =

Scottish footballer (1920–2001)

Personal information
- Full name: Jesse Jones McLarty
- Date of birth: 3 March 1920
- Place of birth: Ayr, Scotland
- Date of death: July 2001 (aged 81)
- Place of death: Chester, England
- Position: Inside forward

Senior career*
Years	Team	Apps	(Gls)
1946–1947	Wrexham	24	(9)
- South Liverpool
- * Club domestic league appearances and goals

Jesse Jones McLarty (3 March 1920 – July 2001) was a Scottish professional footballer, who made appearances in the English football league with Wrexham. He also played for South Liverpool.

McLarty guested for Chester City during World War Two.
