= Cyril Jones (footballer) =

Welsh footballer

Personal information
- Date of birth: 17 July 1920
- Place of birth: Johnstown, Wales
- Date of death: 27 November 1995 (aged 75)
- Place of death: Johnstown, Wales
- Position: Defender

Senior career*
Years	Team	Apps	(Gls)
- Johnstown
1946–1947	Wrexham	29	(0)
- Blaenau Ffestiniog Amateur
- * Club domestic league appearances and goals

Cyril Jones (17 July 1920 – 27 November 1995) was a Welsh professional footballer who played as a defender. He made appearances in the English Football League with Wrexham.
