= Stan Roberts (footballer) =

Welsh footballer

Personal information
- Date of birth: 19 April 1921
- Place of birth: Wrexham, Wales
- Date of death: 1995 (aged 73–74)
- Place of death: Wrexham, Wales
- Position: Forward

Senior career*
Years	Team	Apps	(Gls)
- Cross Street
1946–1948	Wrexham	27	(10)
1948–1951	New Brighton	103	(25)
- Ellesmere Port
- * Club domestic league appearances and goals

Stanley Roberts (19 April 1921 – April 1995) was a Welsh professional footballer, who played in the English football league for Wrexham and New Brighton.
