= David Richards (footballer, born 1910) =

Welsh footballer

Personal information
- Full name: David Richards
- Date of birth: 1910
- Place of birth: Pentrebach, Merthyr Tydfil, Wales
- Height: 5 ft 9 in (1.75 m)
- Position: Left half

Senior career*
Years	Team	Apps	(Gls)
1927–1929	Merthyr Town	13	(0)
1929	Aston Villa	0	(0)
1929–1930	Middlesbrough	0	(0)
1930–1931	Merthyr Town		
1931–1933	Bolton Wanderers	0	(0)
1933–1936	Wrexham	50	(0)
1937	Newport County	1	(0)
1937	Burton Town		
- * Club domestic league appearances and goals

David Richards (1910 – date of death unknown) was a Welsh professional footballer who played as a left half-back. He made appearances in the English Football League for Welsh clubs Merthyr Town, Wrexham and Newport County. He also was registered to Aston Villa, Middlesbrough and Bolton Wanderers - but never appeared for any of them.
