= Leslie Murphy (footballer) =

Northern Irish footballer

Personal information
- Place of birth: Donemana, County Tyrone, Ireland
- Height: 5 ft 11 1/2 in (1.82 m)
- Position: Goalkeeper

Senior career*
Years	Team	Apps	(Gls)
1910–1911	Belfast Celtic		
1911–1912	Leeds City	18	(0)
- Glentoran
- Linfield
1920–1922	Wrexham	34	(0)
1922–1923	Bristol Rovers		
1923–1924	Reading		

International career
1912	League of Ireland XI	2	(0)
- * Club domestic league appearances and goals

Leslie A. Murphy was a Northern Irish goalkeeper who played in the English Football League for Leeds City, Wrexham, Bristol Rovers and Reading.

== Career ==
Getting his start at Belfast Celtic in the 1910–11, Murphy would move to England to play for Leeds City, starting as first choice goalkeeper but lost his place to Cecil Reinhardt.

Only staying at Leeds for one season, he went to Irish club Glentoran, where he won the Irish League.

He stayed in Ireland until 1920, having a brief spell at Linfield, before signing with Wrexham. He held a first team spot before losing it when he contracted rheumatic fever.

In 1922 he moved to Bristol Rovers, and the next season he moved to Reading, where he retired.

== International career ==
In 1912, during his time with Glentoran, Murphy represented the League of Ireland twice.
