= Peter Fisher (footballer, born 1920) =

Scottish footballer

Personal information
- Full name: Peter McArthur Fisher
- Date of birth: 17 February 1920
- Place of birth: Edinburgh, Scotland
- Date of death: December 2010 (aged 90)
- Place of death: Devon, England
- Position: Full-back

Senior career*
Years	Team	Apps	(Gls)
1947–1948	Northampton Town	8	(0)
1950–1951	Shrewsbury Town	39	(0)
1951–1954	Wrexham	85	(0)
- Bedford Town
- * Club domestic league appearances and goals

Peter McArthur Fisher (17 February 1920 – December 2010) was a Scottish professional football who played as a full-back. He played over 100 games in the English football league between spells at Northampton Town, Shrewsbury Town and Wrexham.
