= List of Tranmere Rovers F.C. players =

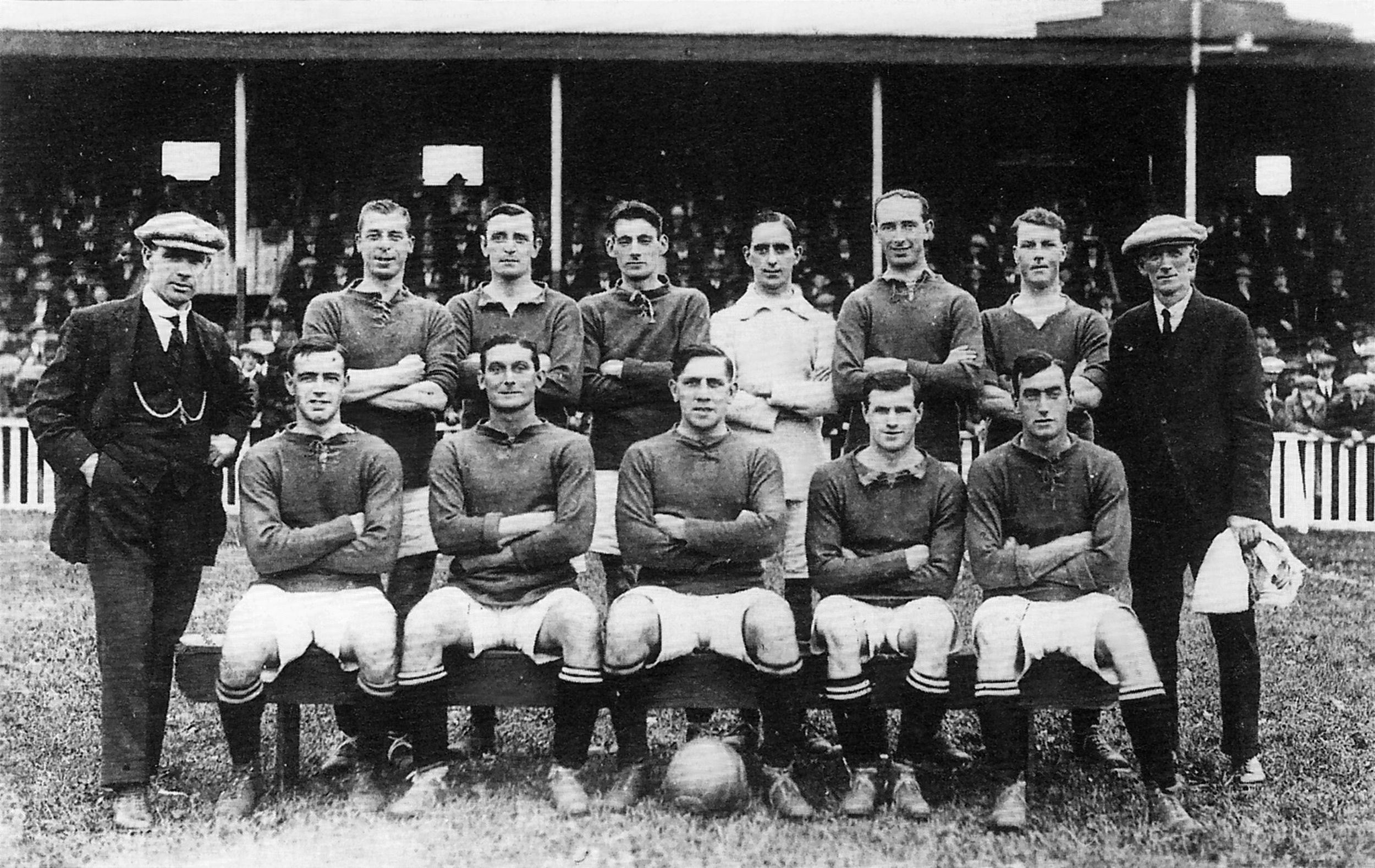
Tranmere in 1921, including Johnny Campbell, Jimmy Moreton and Tommy Stuart

Tranmere Rovers Football Club is an English association football club based in Birkenhead, Wirral. Founded in 1884, they played their first games under the name Belmont F.C.; in 1885, before the start of their second season, they adopted the name Tranmere Rovers. In 1889, Tranmere entered the West Lancashire League, and progressed through the Combination, the Lancashire Combination and the Central League. On 27 August 1921, as founder members of Division Three North, they won their first Football League match 4–1 against Crewe Alexandra at Prenton Park. Tranmere played in the Football League ever since then, with the exception of the war years 1939–1946, and right up until 2015 at which time they were relegated from the Football League down to the National League. Their highest league finish was fourth in the First Division which, at the time, was the second tier of the league pyramid, in the 1992–93 season.

Ray Mathias spent his entire playing career from 1964 to 1984 at Tranmere, making a record 637 appearances in all competitions. Mathias went on to manage the team in 2002. Harold Bell made a record 595 league appearances for Tranmere. Bell also holds the record for the most consecutive league appearances for a British team; he was picked for the first game after the Second World War in the 1946–47 season and did not miss a match until 30 August 1955, a total of 401 consecutive matches in the Third Division North.

Jimmy Moreton made 148 Football League and 22 FA Cup appearances, as well numerous first-team outings in the lower Lancashire Combination and Central Leagues. Upon his retirement in 1926, Moreton became first trainer, then manager of Rovers. As of the end of the 2011–12 season, the most recent player to amass 100 appearances is Ash Taylor.

Ian Muir's tally of 180 goals in 393 appearances makes him Tranmere's leading scorer. John Aldridge scored 174 goals in 294 games, and became player-manager in 1995.

== Players ==
This list contains players who have made 100 or more appearances in nationally organised first-team competition for Tranmere. It includes first-team appearances and goals in the Football League and play-offs, the FA Cup, the Football League Cup, the Third Division North Cup, the Football League Trophy, the Full Members Cup and the Anglo-Italian Cup. Appearances and goals in other competitions or non-competitive matches are not included. Statistics from the three games in the 1939–40 Football League season abandoned because of the Second World War, and the two games against Accrington Stanley in 1961–62, prior to Accrington's resignation from the Football League, have been expunged from the records and are not included. Between 1939 and 1946, Tranmere played 277 games in wartime regional league and cup competitions, but these results are considered friendly matches and are also omitted. Statistics for current players are correct to the end of the 2023-24 season.

Position key
Pre-1960s		1960s–	
GK	Goalkeeper		
FB	Full back	DF	Defender
HB	Half back	MF	Midfielder
FW	Forward		

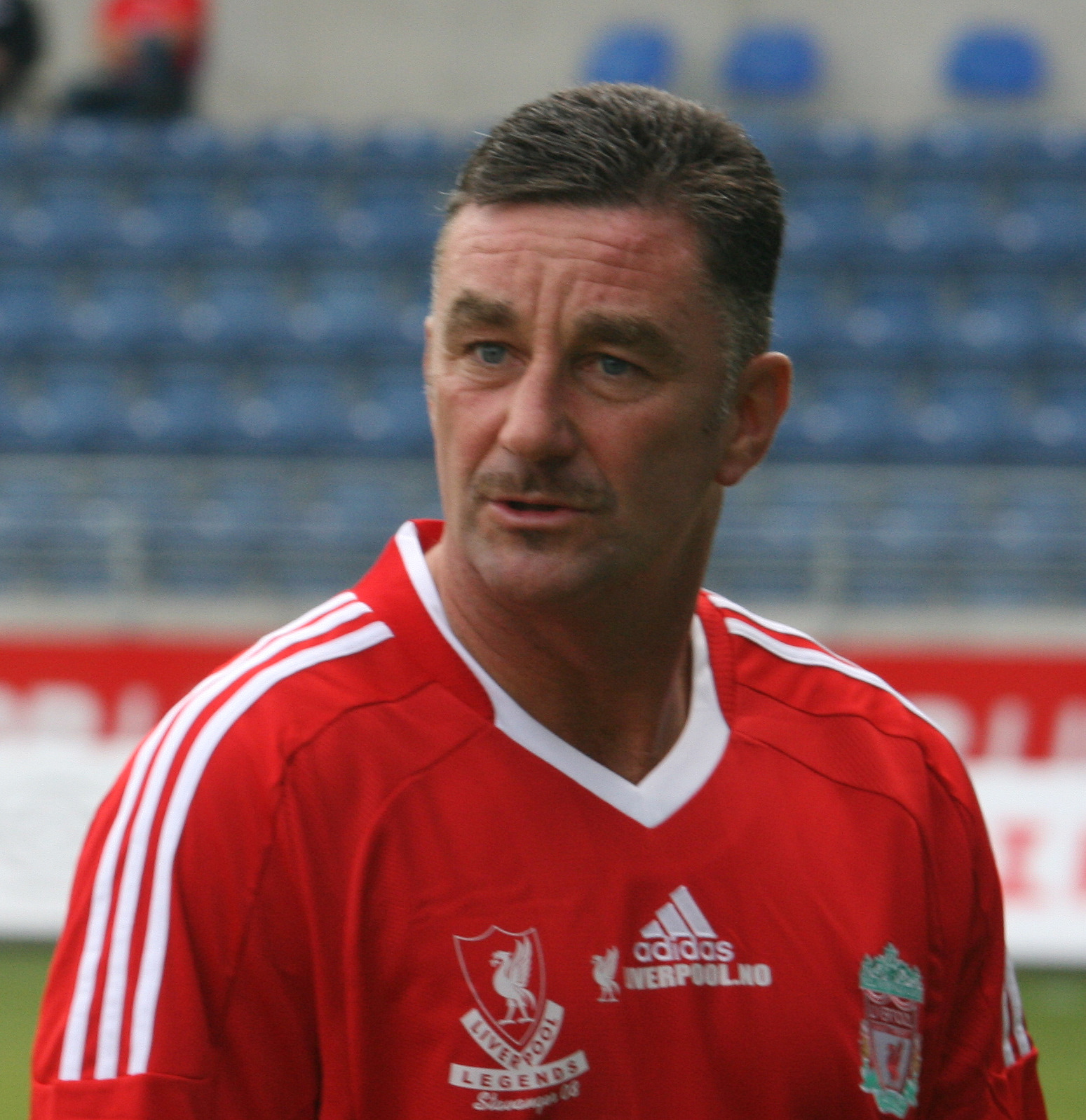
Republic of Ireland international John Aldridge became player-manager in 1995.

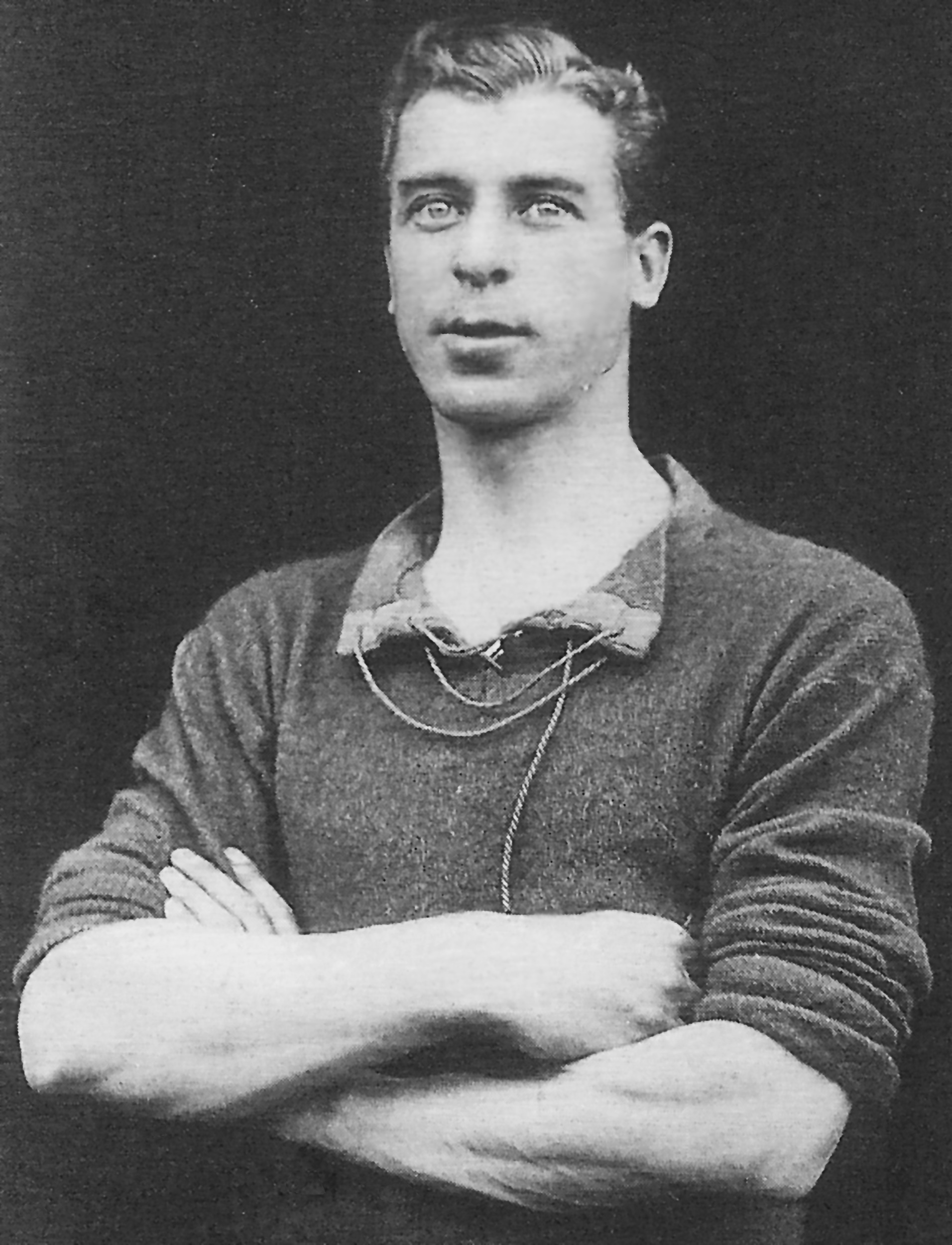
Johnny Campbell played from 1914 to 1929 but remained an amateur player.

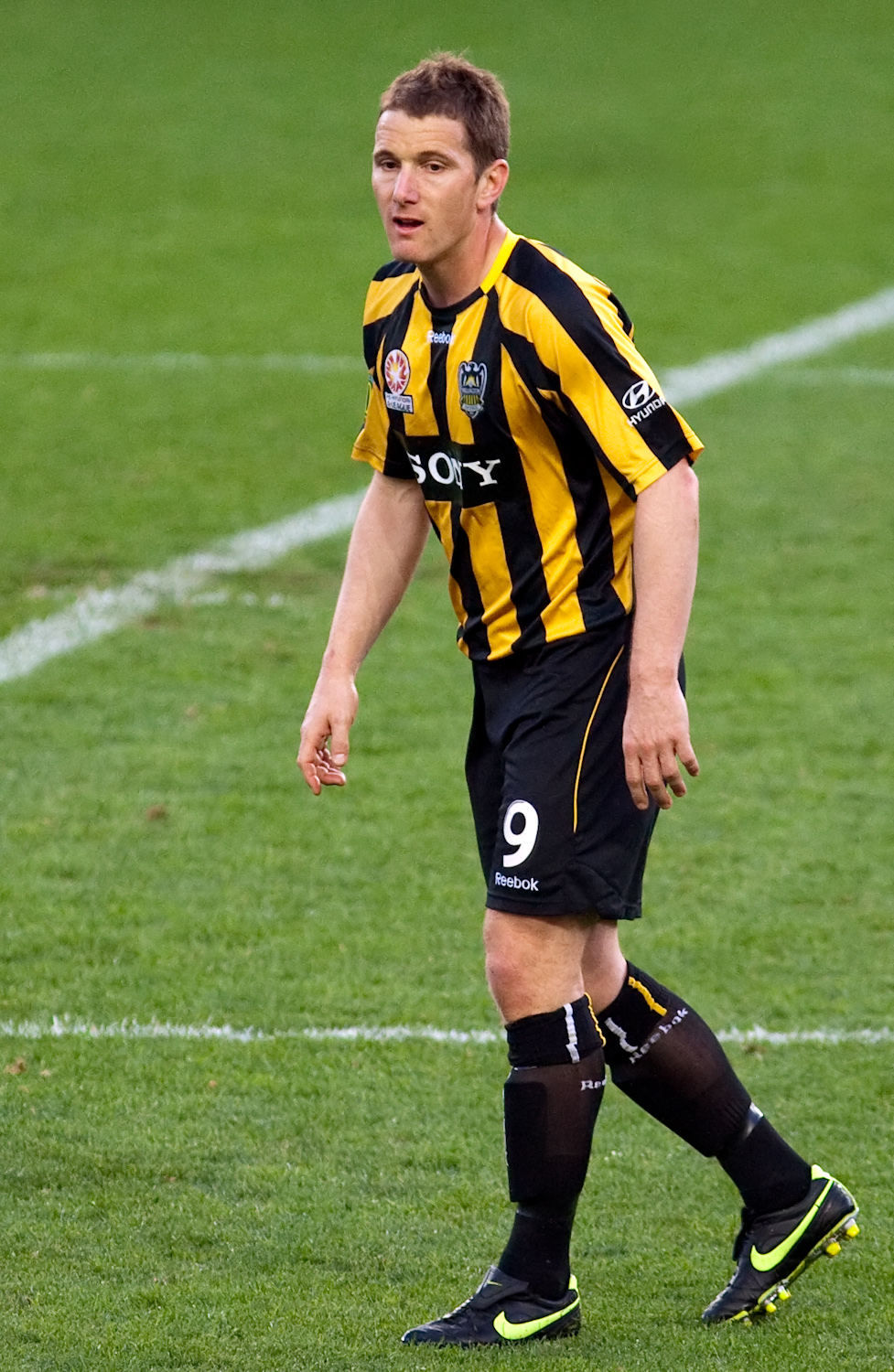
Striker Chris Greenacre made 162 appearances before moving to Wellington Phoenix.

Jimmy Moreton joined in 1910, and went on to manage the team.

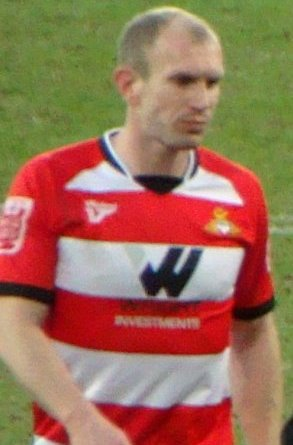
Gareth Roberts represented Tranmere in the 2000 Football League Cup Final.

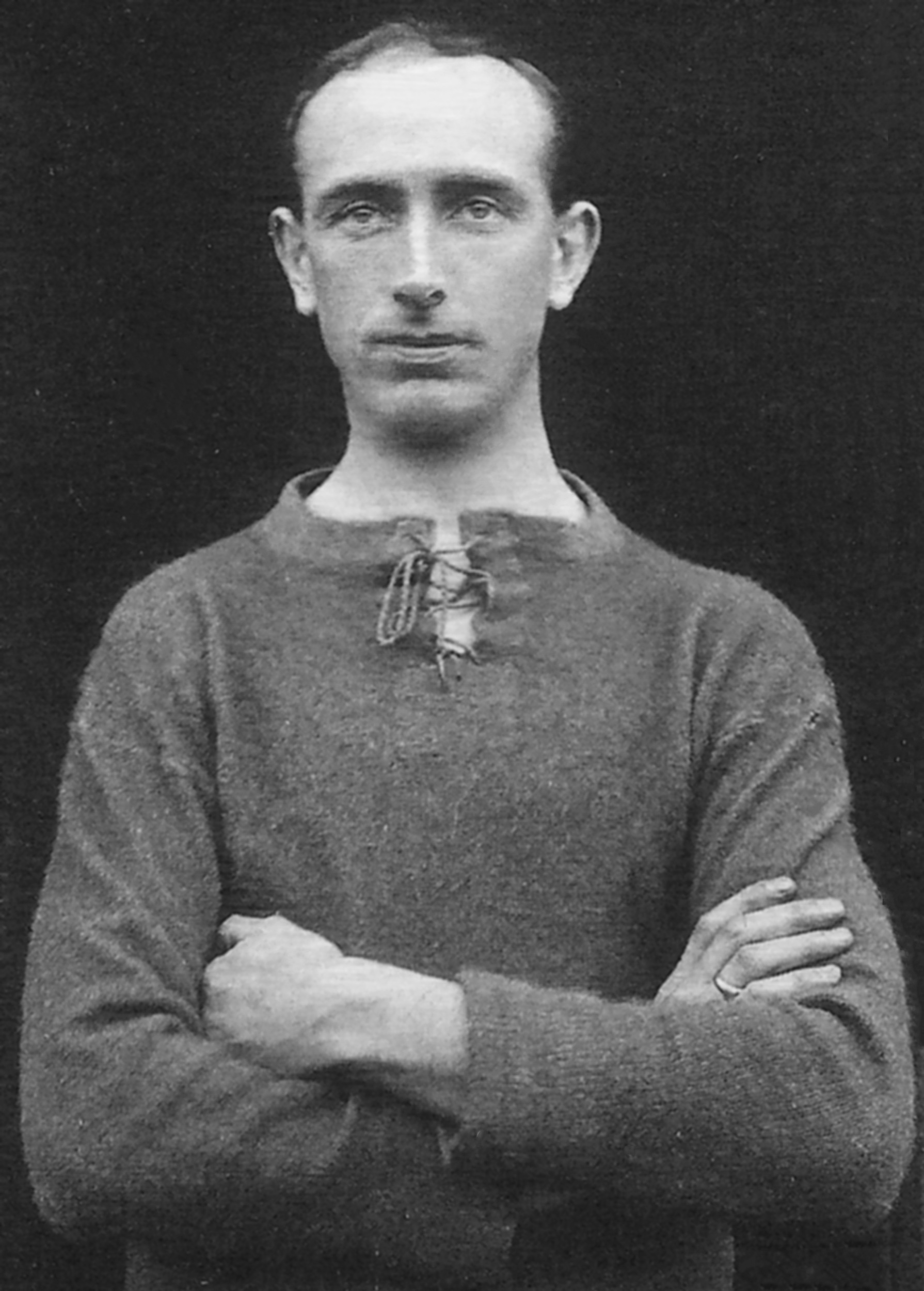
Tommy Stuart was Rovers' regular left back between 1921 and 1927.

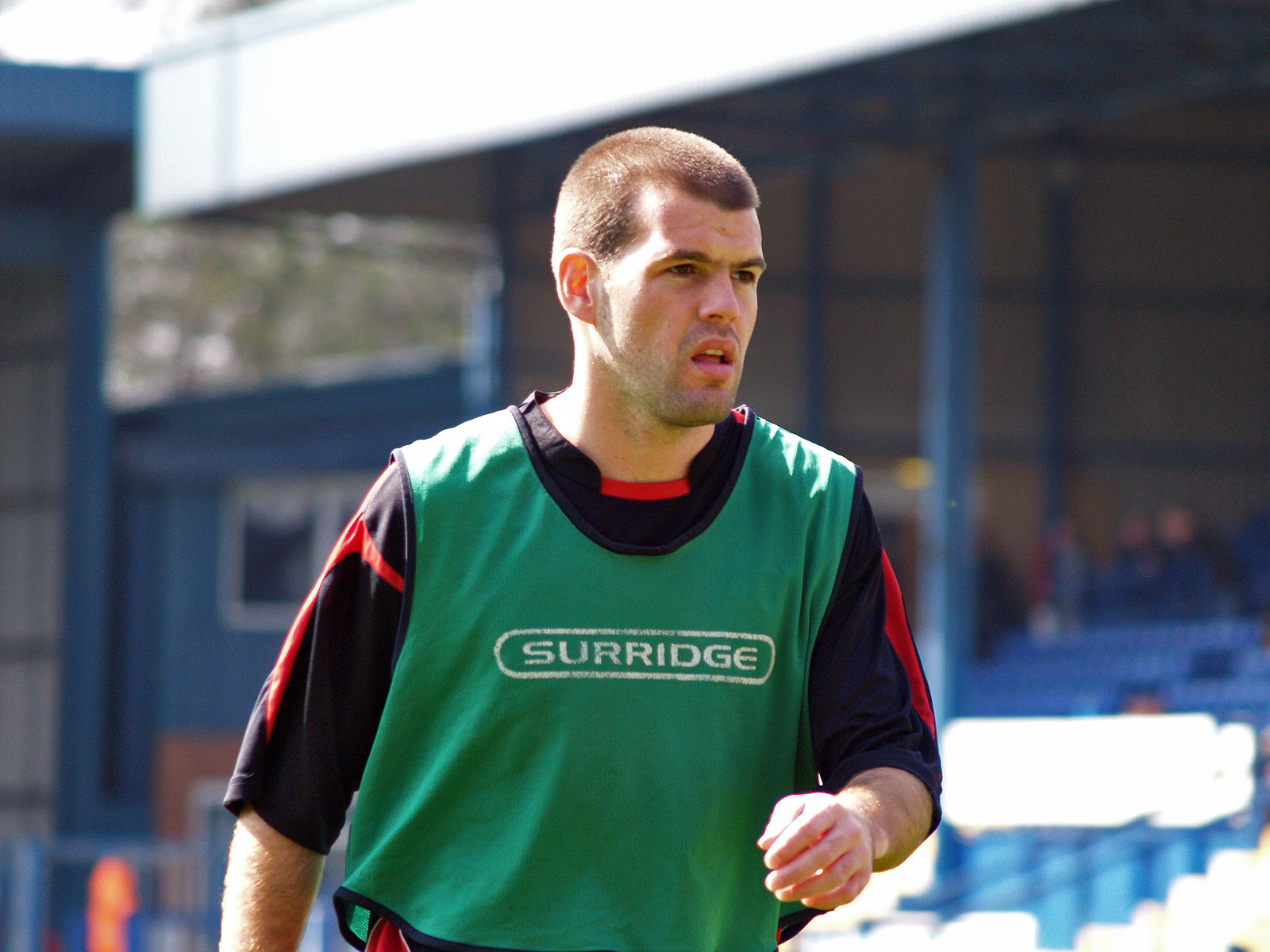
Captain John Welsh made his 100th appearance in the final game of the 2010–11 season.

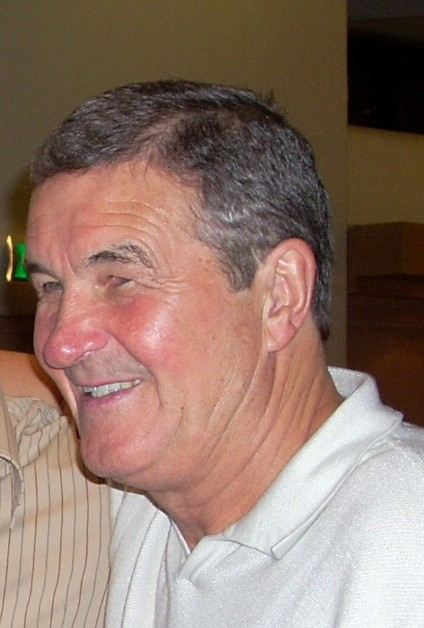
Scotland international Ron Yeats became player-manager in 1972.

List of players with 100 or more appearances
Name	Position (Note: Positions are listed according to the tactical formations that were employed at the time. Thus the change in the names of defenders and midfielders reflects the tactical evolution that occurred from the 1960s onwards.)	Years (Note: Years given denote the span between a player's first and last competitive appearance. Where a player spent multiple periods at the club, these periods are denoted as multiple ranges of years.)	Appearances (Note: FA Cup appearances prior to 1921 are sourced from Upton (1991). Statistics from 1921 to 2009 are taken from Upton; Wilson; Bishop (2009). For more recent players, Soccerbase is used.)	Goals	International (Note: If a player received an international first-team cap, the country or countries he represented are shown.)
John Achterberg	GK	1998–2009	312	0	–
John Aldridge	FW	1991–1998	294	174	Republic of Ireland
Graham Allen	DF	1998–2004	238	11	–
Russell Allen	FW	1973–1978	170	46	–
Wayne Allison	FW	1999–2002	117	32	–
Doug Anderson	FW	1984–1987	147	20	–
John Aspinall	FW	1982–1985, 1987–1988	139	30	–
Harold Atkinson	FW	1945–1955	197	104	–
Bill Bainbridge	FW	1948–1954	182	68	–
Zoumana Bakayogo	DF	2009–2013	122	6	–
Stuart Barlow	FW	2000–2003	115	27	–
Teddy Barton	HB	1925–1935	257	5	–
Kenny Beamish	FW	1965–1972, 1979–1981	278	81	–
Bunny Bell	FW	1930–1936	127	113	–
Harold Bell	HB	1945–1960	631	12	–
John Bramhall	DF	1976–1982	193	8	–
Graham Branch	MF	1991–1998	120	11	–
Ged Brannan	DF	1990–1997	303	25	–
Arthur Briggs	GK	1924–1932	246	0	–
Eric Brodie	MF	1969–1972	100	6	–
David Burgess	DF	1981–1986	260	1	–
Johnny Campbell (Note: Campbell's statistics include 3 FA Cup appearances prior to 1921.)	HB	1914–1929	207	11	–
Les Campbell	FW	1961–1964	111	9	–
Bert Cartman	FW	1923–1930	234	33	–
Dave Challinor	DF	1996–2002	170	6	–
Billy Charlton	FW	1925–1930	137	74	–
Wilf Charlton	HB	1957–1961	101	4	–
Archie Clark	HB	1935–1939	108	1	–
Bobby Conroy	DF	1962–1965	114	2	–
Danny Coyne	GK	1992–1999, 2007–2008	221	0	Wales
Steve Craven	MF	1977–1981	134	20	–
Paul Crossley	FW	1969–1976	229	45	–
Jim Cumbes	GK	1966–1970	156	0	–
Craig Curran	FW	2006–2010	112	16	–
Ray Davies	FW	1951–1958	136	29	–
Ronnie Dellow	FW	1935–1939	110	31	–
Barry Dyson	FW	1962–1967	183	106	–
Harry Eastham	FW	1948–1953	159	12	–
Billy Eden	FW	1934–1939	146	31	–
Tommy Eglington	FW	1957–1961	181	40	(Republic of Ireland) Ireland (FAI); Ireland (IFA) (Note: Between 1926 and 1950, two competing teams represented the island of Ireland – the FAI and the IFA. Eglington and Farrell were dual internationals who played for both teams.)
Clive Evans	MF	1976–1981	200	30	–
Peter Farrell	HB	1957–1960	120	1	(Republic of Ireland) Ireland (FAI); Ireland (IFA)
Syd Farrimond	DF	1970–1974	153	0	–
Mark Ferguson	FW	1981–1985	100	13	–
Ken Finney	FW	1957–1963	195	28	–
Mike Fleming	FW	1953–1958	122	8	–
Eddie Flood	DF	1972–1981	350	7	–
David Frith	FB	1958–1963	188	0	–
Shaun Garnett	DF	1987–1996	146	6	–
Ian Goodison	DF	2004–2014	410	13	Jamaica
Bert Gray	GK	1931–1936	213	0	Wales
Chris Greenacre	FW	2005–2009	162	53	–
Ian Griffiths	FW	1978–1983	135	6	–
Ralph Gubbins	FW	1960–1964	115	37	–
Bryan Hamilton	MF	1980–1985	129	6	Northern Ireland
Des Harlock	FW	1946–1954	157	18	–
Danny Harrison	MF	2001–2007	147	7	–
Jimmy Harvey	MF	1987–1992	239	19	–
Nick Henry	MF	1999–2002	116	5	–
Dave Higgins	DF	1983–1985, 1987–1997	434	12	–
Clint Hill	DF	1997–2002	170	20	–
Mandy Hill	FW	1964–1968	142	10	–
Mark Hughes	DF	1985–1994	344	12	–
Iain Hume	FW	1999–2006	176	37	Canada
Lloyd Iceton	FW	1950–1955	153	22	–
Kenny Irons	MF	1989–1999	429	67	–
George Jackson	FB	1923–1930	114	0	–
Mike Jackson	DF	2002–2003, 2004–2006	102	8	–
Steve Jennings	MF	2003–2009	167	10	–
Dickie Johnson	GK	1971–1982	397	0	–
Derek Jones	FB	1953–1961	165	19	–
Gary Jones	FW	1993–2000, 2002–2005	323	55	–
David Kelly	FW	1997–2000	112	35	Republic of Ireland
John Kerr	FW	1978–1983	178	43	–
Len Kieran	HB	1947–1957	359	6	–
Alan King	MF	1962–1972	385	38	–
Johnny King	MF	1960–1968	264	7	–
Jason Koumas	MF	1998–2003; 2013–2015	207	5	Wales
Bill Lamont	FB	1951–1956	154	3	–
Ginger Lewis	HB	1925–1934	288	10	Wales
Harry Leyland	GK	1960–1967	194	0	–
Harry Littlehales	FW	1923–1932	173	52	–
Harold Lloyd	GK	1945–1957	202	0	–
Alan Mahon	MF	1996–2000, 2009–2011	164	15	Republic of Ireland
Chris Malkin	FW	1987–1995	304	75	–
John Manning	FW	1962–1967, 1971–1972	147	77	–
Barrie Martin	DF	1965–1968	113	0	–
Dave Martindale	MF	1987–1994	212	12	–
Ray Mathias	DF	1967–1985	637	6	–
Mark McCarrick	DF	1987–1991	157	16	–
Kenny McDevitt	FW	1951–1960	249	40	–
Charlie McDonnell	FW	1957–1961, 1963–1965	112	50	–
John McGreal	DF	1991–1999	233	1	–
Paul McLaren	MF	2006–2008, 2009–2011	143	6	–
Neil McNab	MF	1989–1993	139	8	–
Micky Mellon	MF	1997–1999, 2000–2004	205	10	–
Sammy Meston	FW	1929–1932	115	31	–
Ralph Millington	HB	1950–1961	381	3	–
Dave Moorcroft	MF	1968–1972	124	1	–
Ian Moore	FW	1994–1997, 2007–2011	207	51	–
Malcolm Moore	FW	1970–1973	111	26	–
Ronnie Moore	FW	1971–1979, 1986–1989	372	86	–
Jimmy Moreton (Note: Moreton's statistics include 11 FA Cup appearances (and 2 goals) prior to 1921.)	FW	1910–1926	170	14	–
John Morrissey	FW	1985–1999	586	63	–
Ian Muir	FW	1985–1995	393	180	–
Steve Mungall	DF	1979–1996	624	17	–
Pat Nevin	FW	1991–1997	239	39	Scotland
Eric Nixon	GK	1987–1997, 1999–2003	438	0	–
Ian Nolan	DF	1991–1994	114	2	Northern Ireland
Liam O'Brien	MF	1993–1999	214	14	Republic of Ireland
Mark Palios	MF	1973–1980, 1982–1985	286	33	–
Andy Parkinson	FW	1997–2003	203	25	–
Roy Parnell	DF	1964–1967	116	3	–
Les Parry	DF	1972–1984	289	4	–
George Payne	GK	1946–1961	467	0	–
Steve Peplow	FW	1973–1981	272	47	–
Dave Philpotts	DF	1974–1978, 1983–1985	237	12	–
Dick Platt	FB	1932–1937	189	0	–
Joe Pritchard	MF	1962–1970	206	31	–
Gareth Roberts	DF	1999–2006	337	14	Wales
Eddie Robertson	DF	1964–1969	159	1	–
Abe Rosenthal	FW	1938–1939, 1945–1947, 1949–1952, 1954–1955	130	44	–
Tony Rowley	FW	1957–1961	108	49	Wales
Ian Sharps	DF	1998–2006	193	7	–
Chris Shuker	MF	2006–2010	144	18	–
Roy Sinclair	FW	1963–1969, 1972–1973	166	18	–
Reg Spencer	HB	1931–1939	256	3	–
Jim Steel	FW	1987–1992	226	47	–
Percy Steele	FB	1945–1957	338	0	–
Cole Stockton	FW	2011–2017; 2018–2019	139	30	-
Stan Storton	DF	1966–1970	139	2	–
Trevor Storton	DF	1967–1972	135	10	–
Tommy Stuart	FB	1921–1927	205	13	–
Ash Taylor	DF	2009–2014	204	11	–
Ryan Taylor	DF	2002–2005	122	19	–
Scott Taylor	FW	1998–2001	130	22	–
Percy Thirkell	FB	1925–1930	184	0	–
Tony Thomas	DF	1988–1997	314	14	–
Andy Thompson	DF	1997–2000	115	4	–
Bobby Tynan	MF	1972–1978	221	31	–
Fred Urmson	FW	1927–1936	333	107	–
Steve Vickers	DF	1985–1994	387	20	–
Pongo Waring	FW	1927–1928, 1936–1939	105	67	England
Farewell Watts	FW	1929–1934	128	60	–
John Welsh	MF	2009–2012	149	11	–
Johnny Wheeler	HB	1948–1951	106	11	England
Gary Williams	DF	1976–1977, 1982–1989	204	18	–
John Williams	DF	1978–1985	201	13	–
Keith Williams	FW	1957–1961	173	97	–
Ray Williams	HB	1951–1959	214	16	–
Stewie Williamson	FW	1945–1953	105	23	–
Billy Woodward	FW	1933–1936	110	44	–
George Yardley	FW	1966–1971	149	81	–
Steve Yates	DF	1999–2002	137	14	–
Ron Yeats	DF	1971–1974	110	6	Scotland
Tommy Young	FW	1972–1977	193	29	–
Calvin Zola	FW	2004–2008	108	18	–
