= 1957–58 Rochdale A.F.C. season =

English football club season

Rochdale
1957–58 season
- Manager: Harry Catterick
- Stadium: Spotland Stadium
- Division 3 North: 10th
- F.A. Cup: 1st Round
- Top goalscorer: League: Jimmy Dailey; All: Jimmy Dailey

The 1957–58 season was Rochdale A.F.C.'s 51st in existence and their 30th in the Football League Third Division North.

== Statistics ==
No.	Pos	Nat	Player	Total		Division 3 North		F.A. Cup		Lancashire Cup	
No.	Pos	Nat	Player	Apps	Goals	Apps	Goals	Apps	Goals	Apps	Goals
	GK	(England) ENG	Jimmy Jones	33	0	32	0	1	0	0	0
	DF	(Scotland) SCO	Charlie Ferguson	48	1	46	1	1	0	1	0
	DF	(England) ENG	Harold Rudman	23	2	21	2	1	0	1	0
	DF	(England) ENG	Jackie Grant	46	2	45	2	1	0	0	0
	DF	(England) ENG	Bev Glover	42	0	41	0	1	0	0	0
	MF	(England) ENG	Tommy McGlennon	23	1	21	1	1	0	1	0
	MF	(Scotland) SCO	Jock Lockhart	42	11	40	11	1	0	1	0
	FW	(England) ENG	Eddie Wainwright	39	9	38	9	1	0	0	0
	FW	(Scotland) SCO	Dave Pearson	26	13	25	13	0	0	1	0
	FW	(Scotland) SCO	Eddie Moran	28	9	27	9	1	0	0	0
	MF	(Scotland) SCO	Joe Devlin	11	1	11	1	0	0	0	0
	GK	(Scotland) SCO	Bernard McCready	13	0	12	0	0	0	1	0
	FW	(England) ENG	Brian Green	15	3	14	3	0	0	1	0
	MF	(England) ENG	Colin Vizard	26	6	25	6	0	0	1	0
	GK	(Scotland) SCO	George Torrance	2	0	2	0	0	0	0	0
	MF	(Scotland) SCO	Billy McCulloch	25	0	25	0	0	0	0	0
	MF	(Scotland) SCO	Jimmy McGuigan	35	1	34	1	1	0	0	0
	FW	(Scotland) SCO	Jimmy Dailey	30	19	29	19	1	0	0	0
	DF	(England) ENG	Steve Parr	1	0	1	0	0	0	0	0
	MF	(Scotland) SCO	Tom Dryburgh	6	0	5	0	0	0	1	0
	DF	(England) ENG	George Newell	2	0	1	0	0	0	1	0
	MF	(England) ENG	Jim Brown	1	0	1	0	0	0	0	0
	FW	(England) ENG	Les Spencer	7	0	7	0	0	0	0	0
	DF	(Scotland) SCO	Jock Wallace	3	0	3	0	0	0	0	0
	MF		Kevin Barber (b. 1936)	1	0	0	0	0	0	1	0

== Final League Table ==
Pos	Team	Pld	W	D	L	GF	GA	GAv	Pts	Promotion or relegation
8	Chesterfield	46	18	15	13	71	69	1.029	51	Qualification for the Third Division
9	Stockport County	46	18	11	17	74	67	1.104	47	Qualification for the Third Division
10	Rochdale	46	19	8	19	79	67	1.179	46	Qualification for the Third Division
11	Tranmere Rovers	46	18	10	18	82	76	1.079	46	Qualification for the Third Division
12	Wrexham	46	17	12	17	61	63	0.968	46	Qualification for the Third Division

Source: rsssf.com

== Competitions ==
=== Football League Third Division North ===
24 August 1957 1	Mansfield Town	2–4	Rochdale	Mansfield
	Mitten (pen.); Uphill	Report	Lockhart; Moran; Pearson	Stadium: Field Mill; Attendance: 9925

28 August 1957 2	Rochdale	3–0	Accrington Stanley	Rochdale
	McGlennon; Devlin; Wainwright (pen.)	Report		Stadium: Spotland Stadium; Attendance: 12030

31 August 1957 3	Rochdale	1–0	Workington	Rochdale
	Pearson	Report		Stadium: Spotland Stadium; Attendance: 10388

2 September 1957 4	Accrington Stanley	3–2	Rochdale	Accrington
	Stewart; Sowden	Report	Vizard; Pearson	Stadium: Peel Park; Attendance: 15454

7 September 1957 5	Bradford City	1–0	Rochdale	Bradford
	Boyle	Report		Stadium: Valley Parade; Attendance: 13223

11 September 1957 6	Rochdale	5–4	Darlington	Rochdale
	Wainwright (pen.); Moran; Rudman	Report	Furphy; Carr; Wayman	Stadium: Spotland Stadium; Attendance: 4037

14 September 1957 7	Rochdale	2–1	Hull City	Rochdale
	Lockhart; Vizard	Report	Bradbury	Stadium: Spotland Stadium; Attendance: 7612

18 September 1957 8	Darlington	4–2	Rochdale	Darlington
	Wayman; Bell; Harbertson	Report	Wainwright; Grant	Stadium: Feethams; Attendance: 3599

21 September 1957 9	Stockport County	0–3	Rochdale	Stockport
		Report	Wainwright; Green; Lockhart	Stadium: Edgeley Park; Attendance: 12480

25 September 1957 10	Rochdale	1–4	Scunthorpe United	Rochdale
	Bushby (o.g.)	Report	Waldock; Fletcher; Haigh; Marriott	Stadium: Spotland Stadium; Attendance: 5278

28 September 1957 11	Rochdale	5–1	Halifax Town	Rochdale
	Pearson; Moran	Report	Smith	Stadium: Spotland Stadium; Attendance: 5309

3 October 1957 12	Scunthorpe United	2–0	Rochdale	Scunthorpe
	Haigh; Stokes	Report		Stadium: Old Show Ground; Attendance: 11636

5 October 1957 13	Rochdale	1–1	Bury	Rochdale
	Moran	Report	Parker	Stadium: Spotland Stadium; Attendance: 18728

12 October 1957 14	Barrow	2–1	Rochdale	Barrow-in-Furness
	Gordon; Birch	Report	Vizard	Stadium: Holker Street; Attendance: 5668

19 October 1957 15	Rochdale	3–4	Chesterfield	Rochdale
	Lockhart; McGuigan	Report	Blakey; Frear; Tomlinson	Stadium: Spotland Stadium; Attendance: 6441

26 October 1957 16	Tranmere Rovers	3–1	Rochdale	Birkenhead
	Williams; Jones; McDonnell	Report	Pearson	Stadium: Prenton Park; Attendance: 10425

2 November 1957 17	Rochdale	7–0	Hartlepools United	Rochdale
	Dailey; Lockhart; Moran	Report		Stadium: Spotland Stadium; Attendance: 5508

9 November 1957 18	Bradford Park Avenue	2–2	Rochdale	Bradford
	Whittle; Williams	Report	Green; Wainwright	Stadium: Park Avenue; Attendance: 8965

23 November 1957 19	Southport	0–2	Rochdale	Southport
		Report	Green; Dailey	Stadium: Haig Avenue; Attendance: 2880

30 November 1957 20	Rochdale	2–1	York City	Rochdale
	Dailey (pen.)	Report	Metcalfe	Stadium: Spotland Stadium; Attendance: 6297

14 December 1957 21	Rochdale	1–3	Oldham Athletic	Rochdale
	Dailey	Report	Murray; Neale	Stadium: Spotland Stadium; Attendance: 6684

21 December 1957 22	Rochdale	3–0	Mansfield Town	Rochdale
	Dailey; Vizard; Pearson	Report		Stadium: Spotland Stadium; Attendance: 4371

25 December 1957 23	Rochdale	2–0	Wrexham	Rochdale
	Moran; Pearson	Report		Stadium: Spotland Stadium; Attendance: 3342

26 December 1957 24	Wrexham	2–0	Rochdale	Wrexham
	McNab; Evans	Report		Stadium: Racecourse Ground; Attendance: 9204

28 December 1957 25	Workington	1–2	Rochdale	Workington
	Colbridge	Report	Vizard; Dailey	Stadium: Borough Park; Attendance: 8932

4 January 1958 26	Rochdale	3–0	Crewe Alexandra	Rochdale
	Moran; Lockhart; Wainwright; Pearson (red card)	Report		Stadium: Spotland Stadium; Attendance: 4784

11 January 1958 27	Rochdale	0–2	Bradford City	Rochdale
		Report	Marshall	Stadium: Spotland Stadium; Attendance: 7277

18 January 1958 28	Hull City	2–1	Rochdale	Hull
	Clarke; Cripsey	Report	Dailey	Stadium: Boothferry Park; Attendance: 8991

1 February 1958 29	Rochdale	3–0	Stockport County	Rochdale
	Dailey	Report		Stadium: Spotland Stadium; Attendance: 7804

15 February 1958 30	Bury	4–1	Rochdale	Bury
	Watson; Munro; Lovie; Daniel	Report	Lockhart	Stadium: Gigg Lane; Attendance: 12308

22 February 1958 31	Rochdale	2–0	Southport	Rochdale
	Lockhart; Pearson	Report		Stadium: Spotland Stadium; Attendance: 3734

1 March 1958 32	Chesterfield	2–2	Rochdale	Chesterfield
	Hutchinson; Lewis	Report	Pearson; Wainwright	Stadium: Saltergate Recreation Ground; Attendance: 8533

8 March 1958 33	Rochdale	2–0	Tranmere Rovers	Rochdale
	Vizard; Dailey	Report		Stadium: Spotland Stadium; Attendance: 4018

11 March 1958 34	Rochdale	1–0	Carlisle United	Rochdale
	Dailey	Report		Stadium: Spotland Stadium; Attendance: 4079

15 March 1958 35	Hartlepools United	1–3	Rochdale	Hartlepool
	Thompson	Report	Lockhart; Dailey; Moran	Stadium: Victoria Park; Attendance: 5862

22 March 1958 36	Rochdale	1–1	Barrow	Rochdale
	Grant	Report	Purdon	Stadium: Spotland Stadium; Attendance: 5082

29 March 1958 37	Carlisle United	1–0	Rochdale	Carlisle
	Ackerman	Report		Stadium: Brunton Park; Attendance: 3991

4 April 1958 38	Rochdale	0–0	Gateshead	Rochdale
		Report		Stadium: Spotland Stadium; Attendance: 5106

5 April 1958 39	Rochdale	1–1	Chester	Rochdale
	Moran	Report	Whitlock	Stadium: Spotland Stadium; Attendance: 3273

7 April 1958 40	Gateshead	3–2	Rochdale	Gateshead
	Hogg; Kirtley	Report	Wainwright; Dailey	Stadium: Redheugh Park; Attendance: 5110

12 April 1958 41	York City	1–0	Rochdale	York
	Wardle	Report		Stadium: Bootham Crescent; Attendance: 5123

16 April 1958 42	Chester	2–0	Rochdale	Chester
	Hughes (pen.); Mason	Report		Stadium: Sealand Road; Attendance: 3449

19 April 1958 43	Rochdale	1–2	Bradford Park Avenue	Rochdale
	Ferguson (pen.)	Report	Booth; Buchanan	Stadium: Spotland Stadium; Attendance: 4912

21 April 1958 44	Crewe Alexandra	0–0	Rochdale	Crewe
		Report		Stadium: Gresty Road; Attendance: 3000

26 April 1958 45	Oldham Athletic	0–0	Rochdale	Oldham
		Report		Stadium: Boundary Park; Attendance: 10919

29 April 1958 46	Halifax Town	4–1	Rochdale	Halifax
	Smith; Lorenson; Blackburn; Baker	Report	Pearson	Stadium: The Shay; Attendance: 7419

=== F.A. Cup ===
16 November 1957 1	Rochdale	0–2	Darlington	Rochdale
		Report	Harbertson	Stadium: Spotland Stadium; Attendance: 8395

=== Lancashire Cup ===
2 December 1957	Rochdale	0–2	Manchester City	Rochdale
			Goal	Stadium: Spotland Stadium; Attendance: 1795
