= 1956–57 Rochdale A.F.C. season =

English football club season

Rochdale
1956–57 season
- Manager: Harry Catterick
- Stadium: Spotland Stadium
- Division 3 North: 13th
- F.A. Cup: 1st Round
- Top goalscorer: League: Frank Lord; All: Frank Lord

The 1956–57 season was Rochdale A.F.C.'s 50th in existence and their 29th in the Football League Third Division North.

== Statistics ==
| No. | Pos | Nat | Player | Total | | Division 3 North | | F.A. Cup | | Lancashire Cup | |
| No. | Pos | Nat | Player | Apps | Goals | Apps | Goals | Apps | Goals | Apps | Goals |
|---|---|---|---|---|---|---|---|---|---|---|---|
| | GK | (England) ENG | Jimmy Jones | 45 | 0 | 43 | 0 | 1 | 0 | 1 | 0 |
| | DF | (Scotland) SCO | Charlie Ferguson | 41 | 1 | 39 | 1 | 1 | 0 | 1 | 0 |
| | MF | (Scotland) SCO | Billy McCulloch | 47 | 0 | 46 | 0 | 1 | 0 | 0 | 0 |
| | DF | (England) ENG | Jackie Grant | 47 | 1 | 45 | 1 | 1 | 0 | 1 | 0 |
| | DF | (England) ENG | Bev Glover | 34 | 0 | 33 | 0 | 0 | 0 | 1 | 0 |
| | MF | (Scotland) SCO | Jimmy McGuigan | 28 | 1 | 26 | 1 | 1 | 0 | 1 | 0 |
| | MF | (England) ENG | Arnold Kendall | 4 | 0 | 4 | 0 | 0 | 0 | 0 | 0 |
| | FW | (England) ENG | Eddie Wainwright | 39 | 10 | 38 | 10 | 1 | 0 | 0 | 0 |
| | FW | (Scotland) SCO | Tommy Todd | 5 | 1 | 5 | 1 | 0 | 0 | 0 | 0 |
| | FW | (Wales) WAL | Gwyn Lewis | 28 | 11 | 27 | 11 | 1 | 0 | 0 | 0 |
| | MF | (England) ENG | Jimmy Anders | 4 | 0 | 4 | 0 | 0 | 0 | 0 | 0 |
| | MF | (England) ENG | Danny Murphy | 18 | 0 | 18 | 0 | 0 | 0 | 0 | 0 |
| | MF | (England) ENG | George Lyons | 13 | 1 | 13 | 1 | 0 | 0 | 0 | 0 |
| | FW | (England) ENG | Frank Lord | 34 | 15 | 33 | 15 | 1 | 0 | 0 | 0 |
| | MF | (England) ENG | Bernard Stonehouse | 4 | 0 | 4 | 0 | 0 | 0 | 0 | 0 |
| | FW | (Scotland) SCO | Andy McLaren | 23 | 7 | 21 | 7 | 1 | 0 | 1 | 0 |
| | GK | (England) ENG | Albert Morton | 3 | 0 | 3 | 0 | 0 | 0 | 0 | 0 |
| | MF | (Scotland) SCO | Joe Devlin | 28 | 6 | 27 | 6 | 0 | 0 | 1 | 0 |
| | DF | (England) ENG | Jim Storey | 8 | 0 | 6 | 0 | 1 | 0 | 1 | 0 |
| | FW | (England) ENG | Brian Green | 15 | 1 | 14 | 1 | 0 | 0 | 1 | 0 |
| | MF | (England) ENG | Reg Tapley | 2 | 0 | 1 | 0 | 0 | 0 | 1 | 0 |
| | MF | (England) ENG | Cyril Lello | 11 | 0 | 11 | 0 | 0 | 0 | 0 | 0 |
| | DF | (England) ENG | Steve Parr | 15 | 1 | 15 | 1 | 0 | 0 | 0 | 0 |
| | MF | (England) ENG | Gerry Molloy | 3 | 0 | 3 | 0 | 0 | 0 | 0 | 0 |
| | FW | (Scotland) SCO | Eddie Moran | 14 | 4 | 14 | 4 | 0 | 0 | 0 | 0 |
| | FW | (Scotland) SCO | Dave Pearson | 7 | 4 | 7 | 4 | 0 | 0 | 0 | 0 |
| | FW | (England) ENG | Terry Mulvoy | 2 | 0 | 2 | 0 | 0 | 0 | 0 | 0 |
| | MF | (England) ENG | Jim Brown | 4 | 0 | 4 | 0 | 0 | 0 | 0 | 0 |
| | FW | (England) ENG | Derek Andrews | 1 | 0 | 0 | 0 | 1 | 0 | 0 | 0 |
| | FW | (England) ENG | Ray Calderbank | 1 | 0 | 0 | 0 | 0 | 0 | 1 | 0 |
| | MF | (England) ENG | Billy Duff | 0 | 0 | 0 | 0 | 0 | 0 | 0 | 0 |

== Final League Table ==
| Pos | Team | Pld | W | D | L | GF | GA | GAv | Pts |
|---|---|---|---|---|---|---|---|---|---|
| 11 | Halifax Town | 46 | 21 | 7 | 18 | 65 | 70 | 0.929 | 49 |
| 12 | Wrexham | 46 | 19 | 10 | 17 | 97 | 74 | 1.311 | 48 |
| 13 | Rochdale | 46 | 18 | 12 | 16 | 65 | 65 | 1.000 | 48 |
| 14 | Scunthorpe & Lindsey United | 46 | 15 | 15 | 16 | 71 | 69 | 1.029 | 45 |
| 15 | Carlisle United | 46 | 16 | 13 | 17 | 76 | 85 | 0.894 | 45 |

Source: rsssf.com

== Competitions ==
=== Football League Third Division North ===
| 18 August 1956 1 | Rochdale | 1–0 | Barrow | Rochdale |
| | Lewis | Report | | Stadium: Spotland Stadium; Attendance: 3546 |

| 20 August 1956 2 | Mansfield Town | 2–3 | Rochdale | Mansfield |
| | Berry; Smith | Report | Lewis; Todd | Stadium: Field Mill; Attendance: 13441 |

| 25 August 1956 3 | Hull City | 2–0 | Rochdale | Hull |
| | Bradbury; Clarke | Report | | Stadium: Boothferry Park; Attendance: 13089 |

| 29 August 1956 4 | Rochdale | 0–0 | Mansfield Town | Rochdale |
| | | Report | | Stadium: Spotland Stadium; Attendance: 7360 |

| 1 September 1956 5 | Rochdale | 0–0 | Workington | Rochdale |
| | | Report | | Stadium: Spotland Stadium; Attendance: 7414 |

| 8 September 1956 6 | Halifax Town | 2–1 | Rochdale | Halifax |
| | Darbyshire | Report | Lord | Stadium: The Shay; Attendance: 8137 |

| 12 September 1956 7 | Rochdale | 3–0 | Darlington | Rochdale |
| | Wainwright; McLaren | Report | | Stadium: Spotland Stadium; Attendance: 3188 |

| 15 September 1956 8 | Rochdale | 0–2 | Oldham Athletic | Rochdale |
| | | Report | Pearson; Crook | Stadium: Spotland Stadium; Attendance: 10353 |

| 19 September 1956 9 | Derby County | 3–0 | Rochdale | Derby |
| | Barrowcliffe; Straw | Report | | Stadium: Baseball Ground; Attendance: 19405 |

| 22 September 1956 10 | Rochdale | 3–0 | Scunthorpe United | Rochdale |
| | Devlin; McLaren; Wainwright | Report | | Stadium: Spotland Stadium; Attendance: 6320 |

| 26 September 1956 11 | Rochdale | 3–1 | Derby County | Rochdale |
| | McLaren; Lewis | Report | Ryan | Stadium: Spotland Stadium; Attendance: 4835 |

| 29 September 1956 12 | Crewe Alexandra | 1–6 | Rochdale | Crewe |
| | Mountford | Report | Lewis; Lord; Devlin; Wainwright (pen.) | Stadium: Gresty Road; Attendance: 5947 |

| 6 October 1956 13 | Southport | 0–1 | Rochdale | Southport |
| | | Report | Lewis | Stadium: Haig Avenue; Attendance: 5501 |

| 13 October 1956 14 | Rochdale | 1–0 | Chesterfield | Rochdale |
| | Lewis | Report | | Stadium: Spotland Stadium; Attendance: 9011 |

| 20 October 1956 15 | Tranmere Rovers | 2–2 | Rochdale | Birkenhead |
| | Rees | Report | Lord; Lewis | Stadium: Prenton Park; Attendance: 6540 |

| 27 October 1956 16 | Rochdale | 1–0 | Hartlepools United | Rochdale |
| | Wainwright | Report | | Stadium: Spotland Stadium; Attendance: 12237 |

| 3 November 1956 17 | Bradford City | 1–1 | Rochdale | Bradford |
| | Samuels | Report | Wainwright | Stadium: Valley Parade; Attendance: 15887 |

| 10 November 1956 18 | Rochdale | 2–2 | Stockport County | Rochdale |
| | Lord; Lewis | Report | Grant (o.g.); Daley | Stadium: Spotland Stadium; Attendance: 10394 |

| 24 November 1956 19 | Rochdale | 0–2 | Accrington Stanley | Rochdale |
| | | Report | Dick; Sowden | Stadium: Spotland Stadium; Attendance: 11071 |

| 1 December 1956 20 | Chester | 2–2 | Rochdale | Chester |
| | Hansell; Davies (pen.) | Report | McLaren; McGuigan | Stadium: Sealand Road; Attendance: 5492 |

| 15 December 1956 21 | Barrow | 2–0 | Rochdale | Barrow-in-Furness |
| | Armstrong; Ormond | Report | | Stadium: Holker Street; Attendance: 3718 |

| 25 December 1956 22 | Wrexham | 4–1 | Rochdale | Wrexham |
| | Anderson; Evans; Jones; Thompson | Report | McLaren | Stadium: Racecourse Ground; Attendance: 5105 |

| 26 December 1956 23 | Rochdale | 0–2 | Wrexham | Rochdale |
| | | Report | Thompson; Anderson (pen.) | Stadium: Spotland Stadium; Attendance: 4375 |

| 29 December 1956 24 | Workington | 5–0 | Rochdale | Workington |
| | Robson; Dailey; Bertolini | Report | | Stadium: Borough Park; Attendance: 6144 |

| 1 January 1957 25 | Darlington | 4–3 | Rochdale | Darlington |
| | Morton; Tulip | Report | McLaren; Wainwright | Stadium: Feethams; Attendance: 4461 |

| 5 January 1957 26 | Gateshead | 2–1 | Rochdale | Gateshead |
| | Oliver; Smith | Report | Lyons | Stadium: Redheugh Park; Attendance: 1430 |

| 12 January 1957 27 | Rochdale | 1–1 | Halifax Town | Rochdale |
| | Lord | Report | Lonsdale | Stadium: Spotland Stadium; Attendance: 5527 |

| 19 January 1957 28 | Oldham Athletic | 0–1 | Rochdale | Oldham |
| | | Report | Devlin | Stadium: Boundary Park; Attendance: 9006 |

| 26 January 1957 29 | Rochdale | 0–0 | Gateshead | Rochdale |
| | | Report | | Stadium: Spotland Stadium; Attendance: 4561 |

| 2 February 1957 30 | Scunthorpe United | 1–0 | Rochdale | Scunthorpe |
| | Goal | Report | | Stadium: Old Show Ground; Attendance: 6080 |

| 9 February 1957 31 | Rochdale | 1–1 | Crewe Alexandra | Rochdale |
| | Lord | Report | Burns | Stadium: Spotland Stadium; Attendance: 3829 |

| 16 February 1957 32 | Rochdale | 6–1 | Southport | Rochdale |
| | Lord; Devlin; Green | Report | Charlton (pen.) | Stadium: Spotland Stadium; Attendance: 3988 |

| 23 February 1957 33 | Chesterfield | 2–2 | Rochdale | Chesterfield |
| | Lewis; Capel | Report | Lord; Moran | Stadium: Saltergate Recreation Ground; Attendance: 4200 |

| 2 March 1957 34 | Rochdale | 1–0 | Tranmere Rovers | Rochdale |
| | Grant | Report | | Stadium: Spotland Stadium; Attendance: 5499 |

| 5 March 1957 35 | Rochdale | 4–3 | Hull City | Rochdale |
| | McLaren; Lord | Report | Bulless; Bradbury; Collinson | Stadium: Spotland Stadium; Attendance: 4296 |

| 9 March 1957 36 | Hartlepools United | 0–0 | Rochdale | Hartlepool |
| | | Report | | Stadium: Victoria Park; Attendance: 9339 |

| 16 March 1957 37 | Rochdale | 4–1 | Bradford City | Rochdale |
| | Wainwright (pen.); Moran; Pearson; Lord | Report | Jackson | Stadium: Spotland Stadium; Attendance: 7399 |

| 23 March 1957 38 | Stockport County | 3–1 | Rochdale | Stockport |
| | Holden; Moir | Report | Moran | Stadium: Edgeley Park; Attendance: 15652 |

| 30 March 1957 39 | Rochdale | 2–1 | Carlisle United | Rochdale |
| | Devlin; Ferguson | Report | Bond | Stadium: Spotland Stadium; Attendance: 5521 |

| 6 April 1957 40 | Accrington Stanley | 2–1 | Rochdale | Accrington |
| | Millar; Storey (o.g.) | Report | Parr | Stadium: Peel Park; Attendance: 9527 |

| 13 April 1957 41 | Rochdale | 2–1 | Chester | Rochdale |
| | Pearson | Report | Jepson | Stadium: Spotland Stadium; Attendance: 4501 |

| 20 April 1957 42 | York City | 4–0 | Rochdale | York |
| | Wragg; Wilkinson | Report | | Stadium: Bootham Crescent; Attendance: 7203 |

| 22 April 1957 43 | Rochdale | 2–1 | Bradford Park Avenue | Rochdale |
| | Lord; Moran | Report | Houghton | Stadium: Spotland Stadium; Attendance: 5007 |

| 23 April 1957 44 | Bradford Park Avenue | 0–0 | Rochdale | Bradford |
| | | Report | | Stadium: Park Avenue; Attendance: 6280 |

| 27 April 1957 45 | Rochdale | 1–0 | York City | Rochdale |
| | Pearson | Report | | Stadium: Spotland Stadium; Attendance: 4215 |

| 30 April 1957 46 | Carlisle United | 2–1 | Rochdale | Carlisle |
| | Broadis; Ashman | Report | Bond (o.g.) | Stadium: Brunton Park; Attendance: 3999 |

=== F.A. Cup ===
| 17 November 1956 1 | Scunthorpe United | 1–0 | Rochdale | Scunthorpe |
| | Brown | Report | | Stadium: Old Show Ground; Attendance: 8655 |

=== Lancashire Cup ===
| 30 October 1956 | Rochdale | 0–3 | Chester | Rochdale |
| | | | Goal | Stadium: Spotland Stadium; Attendance: 2086 |
