= 1958–59 Rochdale A.F.C. season =

English football club season

Rochdale
1958–59 season
- Manager: Jack Marshall
- Stadium: Spotland Stadium
- Third Division: 24th (relegated)
- FA Cup: First round
- Top goalscorer: League: Eddie Wainwright; Les Spencer; All: Eddie Wainwright

The 1958–59 season was Rochdale A.F.C.'s 52nd in existence and their first in the newly formed Football League Third Division.

== Statistics ==
No.	Pos	Nat	Player	Total		Division 3		F.A. Cup		Lancashire Cup	
No.	Pos	Nat	Player	Apps	Goals	Apps	Goals	Apps	Goals	Apps	Goals
	GK	(England) ENG	Jimmy Jones	27	0	25	0	1	0	1	0
	DF	(Scotland) SCO	Charlie Ferguson	37	2	32	1	3	0	2	1
	DF	(England) ENG	Donald Whiston	17	0	14	0	0	0	3	0
	DF	(England) ENG	Jackie Grant	12	0	12	0	0	0	0	0
	DF	(England) ENG	Bev Glover	26	0	21	0	3	0	2	0
	MF	(Scotland) SCO	Jimmy McGuigan	14	0	10	0	2	0	2	0
	MF	(Scotland) SCO	Gordon McBain	12	1	10	1	0	0	2	0
	FW	(England) ENG	Eddie Wainwright	29	11	24	8	3	3	2	0
	FW	(Scotland) SCO	Jimmy Dailey	27	6	24	6	1	0	2	0
	FW	(Scotland) SCO	Eddie Moran	2	0	2	0	0	0	0	0
	MF	(Scotland) SCO	Jim Maguire	18	0	15	0	3	0	0	0
	FW	(England) ENG	Les Spencer	41	10	35	8	3	1	3	1
	GK	(Scotland) SCO	Bernard McCready	21	0	17	0	2	0	2	0
	MF	(England) ENG	Tommy McGlennon	46	1	40	1	3	0	3	0
	MF	(England) ENG	Colin Vizard	16	1	16	1	0	0	0	0
	DF	(Wales) WAL	Dai Powell	28	1	24	1	3	0	1	0
	FW	(England) ENG	Bill Finney	35	2	31	1	3	1	1	0
	MF	(Scotland) SCO	Bert Thomson	25	0	24	0	0	0	1	0
	FW	(England) ENG	Brian Green	14	3	11	3	1	0	2	0
	GK	(England) ENG	George Heyes	4	0	4	0	0	0	0	0
	DF	(Scotland) SCO	Jock Wallace	4	0	4	0	0	0	0	0
	FW	(England) ENG	Frank Lord	12	2	11	2	0	0	1	0
	MF	(England) ENG	Jim Brown	20	0	17	0	2	0	1	0
	DF	(England) ENG	Ray Aspden	25	0	24	0	0	0	1	0
	MF	(England) ENG	Alan Moore	12	3	11	2	0	0	1	1
	DF	(England) ENG	Stanley Milburn	20	0	20	0	0	0	0	0
	FW	(England) ENG	George Cooper	15	2	15	2	0	0	0	0
	DF	(England) ENG	Norman Bodell	11	0	11	0	0	0	0	0
	FW	(England) ENG	Bobby Entwistle	1	0	1	0	0	0	0	0
	DF	(England) ENG	Malcolm Hussey	1	0	1	0	0	0	0	0

== Final League Table ==
Pos	Team	Pld	W	D	L	GF	GA	GAv	Pts	Promotion or relegation
20	Mansfield Town	46	14	13	19	73	98	0.745	41	
21	Stockport County (R)	46	13	10	23	65	78	0.833	36	Relegation to the Fourth Division
22	Doncaster Rovers (R)	46	14	5	27	50	90	0.556	33	Relegation to the Fourth Division
23	Notts County (R)	46	8	13	25	55	96	0.573	29	Relegation to the Fourth Division
24	Rochdale (R)	46	8	12	26	37	79	0.468	28	Relegation to the Fourth Division

(R) Relegated

== Competitions ==
=== Football League Third Division ===
23 August 1958 1	Stockport County	1–0	Rochdale	Stockport
	Holden 78' (pen.)	Report		Stadium: Edgeley Park; Attendance: 12171

25 August 1958 2	Rochdale	0–2	Plymouth Argyle	Rochdale
		Report	Carter 10'; Penk 14'	Stadium: Spotland Stadium; Attendance: 8442

30 August 1958 3	Rochdale	1–0	Reading	Rochdale
	Dailey 85' (pen.)	Report		Stadium: Spotland Stadium; Attendance: 6629

4 September 1958 4	Plymouth Argyle	2–1	Rochdale	Plymouth
	Carter 50' (pen.); Williams 65'	Report	Spencer; McGlennon (red card) 79'	Stadium: Home Park; Attendance: 26961

6 September 1958 5	Colchester United	2–1	Rochdale	Colchester
	Langman 38'; McLeod 88'	Report	Dailey 25' (pen.)	Stadium: Layer Road; Attendance: 8141

10 September 1958 6	Rochdale	1–1	Swindon Town	Rochdale
	Wainwright	Report	D'Arcy	Stadium: Spotland Stadium; Attendance: 6617

13 September 1958 7	Rochdale	2–1	Bournemouth and Boscombe Athletic	Rochdale
	Dailey 43'; Spencer 47'	Report	Brown 53'	Stadium: Spotland Stadium; Attendance: 6361

17 September 1958 8	Swindon Town	2–1	Rochdale	Swindon
	Moore; Chamberlain	Report	Green	Stadium: County Ground; Attendance: 9558

20 September 1958 9	Norwich City	2–1	Rochdale	Norwich
	Ripley 28' (pen.); Allcock 31'	Report	Spencer 46'	Stadium: Carrow Road; Attendance: 16422

23 September 1958 10	Rochdale	1–4	Tranmere Rovers	Rochdale
	Green	Report	Williams; McDonnell	Stadium: Spotland Stadium; Attendance: 3854

27 September 1958 11	Rochdale	1–1	Southend United	Rochdale
	Spencer 63'	Report	Hollis 9'	Stadium: Spotland Stadium; Attendance: 5719

29 September 1958 12	Tranmere Rovers	2–1	Rochdale	Birkenhead
	Williams; Ferguson (o.g.)	Report	McBain	Stadium: Prenton Park; Attendance: 16878

4 October 1958 13	Bury	6–1	Rochdale	Bury
	McIntosh 11', 61'; Parker 52', 66'; Darbyshire 55', 78'	Report	Dailey 75'	Stadium: Gigg Lane; Attendance: 11865

7 October 1958 14	Rochdale	2–2	Queens Park Rangers	Rochdale
	Green; Lord	Report	Tomkys; Cameron	Stadium: Spotland Stadium; Attendance: 4276

11 October 1958 15	Rochdale	1–2	Notts County	Rochdale
	Ferguson 67' (pen.)	Report	Newsham 47' (pen.), 52'	Stadium: Spotland Stadium; Attendance: 5306; Referee: A Murdoch

18 October 1958 16	Chesterfield	0–0	Rochdale	Chesterfield
		Report		Stadium: Saltergate Recreation Ground; Attendance: 8253

25 October 1958 17	Rochdale	1–1	Newport County	Rochdale
	Wainwright 88'	Report	McPherson 5'	Stadium: Spotland Stadium; Attendance: 4998

1 November 1958 18	Halifax Town	2–1	Rochdale	Halifax
	Smith 56'; South 65'	Report	Spencer 39'	Stadium: The Shay; Attendance: 7129

8 November 1958 19	Rochdale	1–0	Accrington Stanley	Rochdale
	Wainwright 43'	Report		Stadium: Spotland Stadium; Attendance: 6286

22 November 1958 20	Rochdale	0–1	Hull City	Rochdale
		Report	Bradbury 2'	Stadium: Spotland Stadium; Attendance: 5562

29 November 1958 21	Bradford City	7–1	Rochdale	Bradford
	McCole 9', 10', 41'; Webb 38', 67'; Stokes 54'; Reid 75'	Report	Spencer 58'	Stadium: Valley Parade; Attendance: 6223

13 December 1958 22	Brentford	2–1	Rochdale	Brentford
	Towers 58'; Dargie 89'	Report	Moore 31'	Stadium: Griffin Park; Attendance: 9432

20 December 1958 23	Rochdale	0–2	Stockport County	Rochdale
		Report	Jackson 20'; Wilson 83'	Stadium: Spotland Stadium; Attendance: 4056

26 December 1958 24	Rochdale	1–0	Doncaster Rovers	Rochdale
	Wainwright	Report		Stadium: Spotland Stadium; Attendance: 4075

27 December 1958 25	Doncaster Rovers	1–1	Rochdale	Doncaster
	Callan 19'	Report	Vizard	Stadium: Belle Vue; Attendance: 7237

3 January 1959 26	Reading	3–0	Rochdale	Reading
	Reeves 20' (pen.); Wheeler 51'; McLaren 84'	Report		Stadium: Elm Park; Attendance: 11240

24 January 1959 27	Rochdale	3–1	Wrexham	Rochdale
	Wainwright 32', 85'; Moore 65'	Report	Jones 20'	Stadium: Spotland Stadium; Attendance: 5200

31 January 1959 28	Bournemouth and Boscombe Athletic	0–0	Rochdale	Bournemouth
		Report		Stadium: Dean Court; Attendance: 9945

2 February 1959 29	Southampton	6–1	Rochdale	Southampton
	Hoskins 7', 71'; Mulgrew 40', 88'; Reeves 48', 50'	Report	Wainwright 12'	Stadium: The Dell; Attendance: 7199

7 February 1959 30	Rochdale	1–2	Norwich City	Rochdale
	Dailey 17'	Report	Bly 46'; Crossan 67'	Stadium: Spotland Stadium; Attendance: 4608

14 February 1959 31	Southend United	3–1	Rochdale	Southend-on-Sea
	Hollis 33'; Houghton 71'; McCrory 83'	Report	Lord 53'	Stadium: Roots Hall; Attendance: 8766

21 February 1959 32	Rochdale	1–0	Bury	Rochdale
	Dailey 20'	Report		Stadium: Spotland Stadium; Attendance: 4241

28 February 1959 33	Notts County	1–1	Rochdale	Nottingham
	Roby 15'	Report	Wainwright 35' (pen.)	Stadium: Meadow Lane; Attendance: 6394

7 March 1959 34	Rochdale	0–0	Chesterfield	Rochdale
		Report		Stadium: Spotland Stadium; Attendance: 3340

14 March 1959 35	Newport County	1–0	Rochdale	Newport
	McPherson 78'	Report		Stadium: Rodney Parade; Attendance: 4469

16 March 1959 36	Rochdale	0–1	Colchester United	Rochdale
		Report	Langman	Stadium: Spotland Stadium; Attendance: 3510

21 March 1959 37	Rochdale	1–0	Halifax Town	Rochdale
	Spencer 65'	Report		Stadium: Spotland Stadium; Attendance: 3544

27 March 1959 38	Rochdale	2–2	Mansfield Town	Rochdale
	McGlennon; Finney	Report	Griffiths; Uphill	Stadium: Spotland Stadium; Attendance: 3537; Referee: RTE Langdale

28 March 1959 39	Accrington Stanley	4–2	Rochdale	Accrington
	Gibson 30'; Scott 44'; Anders 58'; Tighe 67'	Report	Spencer 11'; Powell 50'	Stadium: Peel Park; Attendance: 4412

30 March 1959 40	Mansfield Town	0–0	Rochdale	Mansfield
		Report		Stadium: Field Mill; Attendance: 5863

4 April 1959 41	Rochdale	1–0	Southampton	Rochdale
	Cooper 77'	Report		Stadium: Spotland Stadium; Attendance: 3948

11 April 1959 42	Hull City	2–1	Rochdale	Hull
	Clarke 73'; Bowering 82'	Report	Cooper 36'	Stadium: Boothferry Park; Attendance: 13377

18 April 1959 43	Rochdale	0–3	Bradford City	Rochdale
		Report	McCole 30', 31'; Boyle 70'	Stadium: Spotland Stadium; Attendance: 4330

20 April 1959 44	Queens Park Rangers	3–0	Rochdale	London
	Angell; Longbottom; Whitelaw	Report		Stadium: Loftus Road; Attendance: 7280

25 April 1959 45	Wrexham	1–0	Rochdale	Wrexham
	Aspden 44' (o.g.)	Report		Stadium: Racecourse Ground; Attendance: 5244

27 April 1959 46	Rochdale	0–0	Brentford	Rochdale
		Report		Stadium: Spotland Stadium; Attendance: 2191

=== F.A. Cup ===
15 November 1958 1	Hartlepools United	1–1	Rochdale	Hartlepool
	Luke 15'	Report	Wainwright 86'	Stadium: Victoria Park; Attendance: 7164

19 November 1958 1	Rochdale	3–3 (a.e.t.)	Hartlepools United	Rochdale
	Finney; Wainwright; Spencer	Report	Luke; Johnson	Stadium: Spotland Stadium; Attendance: 8763; Referee: JG Williams

27 November 1958 1	Hartlepools United	2–1 (a.e.t.)	Rochdale	Hartlepool
	Smith 74'; Johnson 116'	Report	Wainwright 30'	Stadium: Victoria Park; Attendance: 6126

=== Lancashire Cup ===
13 October 1958	Preston North End	1–1	Rochdale	Preston
	Goal		Ferguson (pen.)	Stadium: Deepdale

27 October 1958	Rochdale	1–0	Preston North End	Rochdale
	Spencer			Stadium: Spotland Stadium; Attendance: 1540

8 December 1958	Manchester United	3–1	Rochdale	Manchester
	Goal		Moore	Stadium: Old Trafford; Attendance: 7644
