= Les Parry (footballer) =

English footballer (born 1953)

Personal information
- Full name: Leslie Parry
- Date of birth: 3 November 1953 (age 72)
- Place of birth: Wallasey, England

Senior career*
Years	Team	Apps	(Gls)
1972–1984	Tranmere Rovers	258	(4)
- * Club domestic league appearances and goals

Les Parry (born 3 November 1953) is an English former footballer. He played for Tranmere Rovers as a centre back over 250 times between 1975 and 1983.

He made his debut for Tranmere in an away fixture against Brentford, a 2–0 loss on 9 October 1972. His first career goal came against Chesterfield in 2–1 home win in April 1977.

During the 1977–78 season, Tranmere manager John King selected the same Tranmere Rovers team for 28 consecutive league games – their birthplaces are in brackets: Dickie Johnson (Huyton), Ray Mathias (Liverpool), Eddie Flood (Liverpool), Les Parry (Wallasey), Dave Philpotts (Wirral), Clive Evans (Wirral), Steve Peplow (Liverpool), Mark Palios (Liverpool), Ronnie Moore (Huyton), Bobby Tynan (Liverpool) and Russell Allen (Smethwick). It's considered to be one of the most 'local' teams in Football League history as all players bar one were born within 10 miles of Prenton Park.

In Parry's testimonial year, he was sent off twice. He broke his leg, meaning that he would miss his own testimonial through injury. It took place against Derby County F.C.

His last game for Tranmere was a 1–0 loss against Darlington on 1 December 1983.

== Career statistics ==
Club performance			Football league		FA Cup		League Cup		Associate Members Cup		Total	
Season	Club	Division	Apps	Goals	Apps	Goals	Apps	Goals	Apps	Goals	Apps	Goals
1972-73	Tranmere Rovers F.C.	English Third Division	2 (1)	0	0	0	0	0	0	0	3	0
1973-74	Tranmere Rovers F.C.	English Third Division	0	0	0	0	0	0	0	0	0	0
1974-75	Tranmere Rovers F.C.	English Third Division	11 (2)	0	3	0	0	0	0	0	16	0
1975-76	Tranmere Rovers F.C.	English Fourth Division	21	0	1	0	3	0	0	0	24	0
1976-77	Tranmere Rovers F.C.	English Third Division	23	1	0	0	3	0	0	0	26	1
1977-78	Tranmere Rovers F.C.	English Third Division	45	0	2	0	2	0	0	0	49	0
1978-79	Tranmere Rovers F.C.	English Third Division	46	1	3	0	0	0	0	0	49	1
1979-80	Tranmere Rovers F.C.	English Fourth Division	21	0	1	0	0	0	0	0	22	0
1980-81	Tranmere Rovers F.C.	English Fourth Division	38	2	3	0	4	0	0	0	45	2
1981-82	Tranmere Rovers F.C.	English Fourth Division	28 (1)	0	0	0	2	0	0	0	31	0
1982-83	Tranmere Rovers F.C.	English Fourth Division	10	0	3	0	0	0	3	0	16	0
1983-84	Tranmere Rovers F.C.	English Fourth Division	9	0	0	0	1	0	0	0	10	0
Career Total			258	4	16	0	15	0	3	0	291	4
