= Harold Lloyd (disambiguation) =

Harold Lloyd (1893–1971) was an American film actor and producer

Harold or Harry Lloyd may also refer to:

- Harold Lloyd Jr. (1931–1971), American actor and singer, son of Harold Lloyd
- Harold Lloyd (footballer) (1920–1984), Welsh footballer
- Harry Lloyd (born 1983), English actor
- Harry Lloyd (footballer) (1899–1976), Australian footballer
- Harry Lloyd (rugby union) (born 1995), Australian rugby union player
- Harry J. Lloyd (1926–1997), American businessman and real estate developer
- Harold Lloyd Murphy (1927–2022), American judge
