= Clive Baker =

Clive Baker may refer to:

- Clive Baker (footballer, born 1959), English football goalkeeper
- Clive Baker (footballer, born 1934) (1934–2012), English football forward
