= Joe Devlin =

Joseph or Joe Devlin may refer to:

- Joseph Devlin (1871–1934), Irish journalist and nationalist politician
- Joe Devlin (American football) (born 1954), American football offensive tackle
- Joe Devlin (footballer) (1927–2020), retired Scottish professional footballer
- Jack Devlin (Australian politician) (1900–1957), a.k.a. Joseph Devlin, Australian politician
- Joe Devlin (actor) (1894–1973), American actor
