= Eugene Wilson =

Eugene Wilson may refer to:

== Politics ==
- W. Eugene Wilson (1929–2015), Republican member of the North Carolina General Assembly
- Eugene M. Wilson (1833–1890), U.S. representative for Minnesota, 1869–1871
- Eugene T. Wilson (1852–1925), American politician in the state of Washington

== Sports ==
- Eugene Wilson (English footballer) (1932–2006)
- Eugene Wilson (American football) (born 1980), American football player in the 2000s
- Eugene Wilson III, his son, American football wide receiver
- Gene Wilson (American football) (1926–2002), American football player in the 1940s

== See also ==
- Jean Wilson (disambiguation)
