= Ken Booth =

Ken Booth may refer to:

- Ken Booth (academic) (born 1943), British international relations theorist
- Ken Booth (footballer) (1934–2015), English footballer
- Ken Booth (politician) (1926–1988), New South Wales politician

== See also ==
- Ken Boothe (born 1948), Jamaican recording artist
