= Gren Jones =

Gren Jones may refer to:

- Gren Jones (cartoonist) (1934–2007), Welsh cartoonist
- Gren Jones (footballer) (1932–1991), English footballer
