= Robert Conroy (disambiguation) =

Robert Conroy may refer to:

- Robert Conroy (politician) (1811-1868), Irish born politician
- Robert Conroy (Joseph Robert Conroy, 1938-2014), American author
- Bobby Conroy (1929-1978), Scottish footballer)
