= Reginald Lloyd =

Reginald Lloyd may refer to:

- Reg Lloyd (Reginald G. Lloyd), Welsh rugby union and rugby league player
- Reginald I. Lloyd, American lawyer

== See also ==
- Reg Lloyd (Australian footballer) (Harry Reginald Lloyd), Australian rules footballer
