= Jean Wilson =

Jean or Jeanne Wilson may refer to:

- Jean Moorcroft Wilson (born 1941), British academic
- Jean Wilson (speed skater) (1910–1933), Canadian skater
- Jean Wilson (politician) (1928–2014), Pennsylvania politician
- Jeanne Wilson (swimmer), American competition swimmer
- Jeanne Wilson (seamstress), sewed spacesuits for the Apollo 11 astronauts
- Jean Wilson (editor), editorial collective member of Room of One's Own
- Jean Wilson (scientist), elected Member of the National Academy of Sciences (medical physiology and metabolism) in 1983
- Jean Wilson, a character in the television series The Last Train

== See also ==
- Gene Wilson (disambiguation)
