= Jimmy Moreton =

English footballer and manager

- Moreton in 1921

Personal information
- Date of birth: 22 September 1891
- Date of death: August 1942 (aged 50)
- Height: 5 ft 9 in (1.75 m)

Senior career*
Years	Team	Apps	(Gls)
????–1910	Cammell Laird		
1910–1926	Tranmere Rovers	148	(12)

Managerial career
- 1939–1942: Tranmere Rovers
- * Club domestic league appearances and goals

Jimmy J. Moreton (22 September 1891 – August 1942) was an English football player and manager. He joined Tranmere Rovers from Cammell Laird in July 1910. He was switched from right-half to outside right, where he set up countless goals for a succession of Tranmere centre forwards, including Dixie Dean, in almost 500 appearances at the club.

Upon retirement, aged 37, Moreton became trainer alongside manager Bert Cooke, before taking over as manager himself, from 1939, during World War II. He died in 1942, and was succeeded by another former player, Bill Ridding.
