= Roy Lorenson =

English footballer

Personal information
- Date of birth: 8 April 1932 (age 94)
- Place of birth: Liverpool, England
- Position: Centre half

Youth career
- St. Elizabeth's

Senior career*
Years	Team	Apps	(Gls)
1951–1961	Halifax Town	217	(7)
1961–1962	Tranmere Rovers	14	(0)
Total		231	(7)
- * Club domestic league appearances and goals

Roy Lorenson is a footballer who played as a centre half in the Football League for Tranmere Rovers.
