= Johnny Campbell (footballer, born 1894) =

English footballer

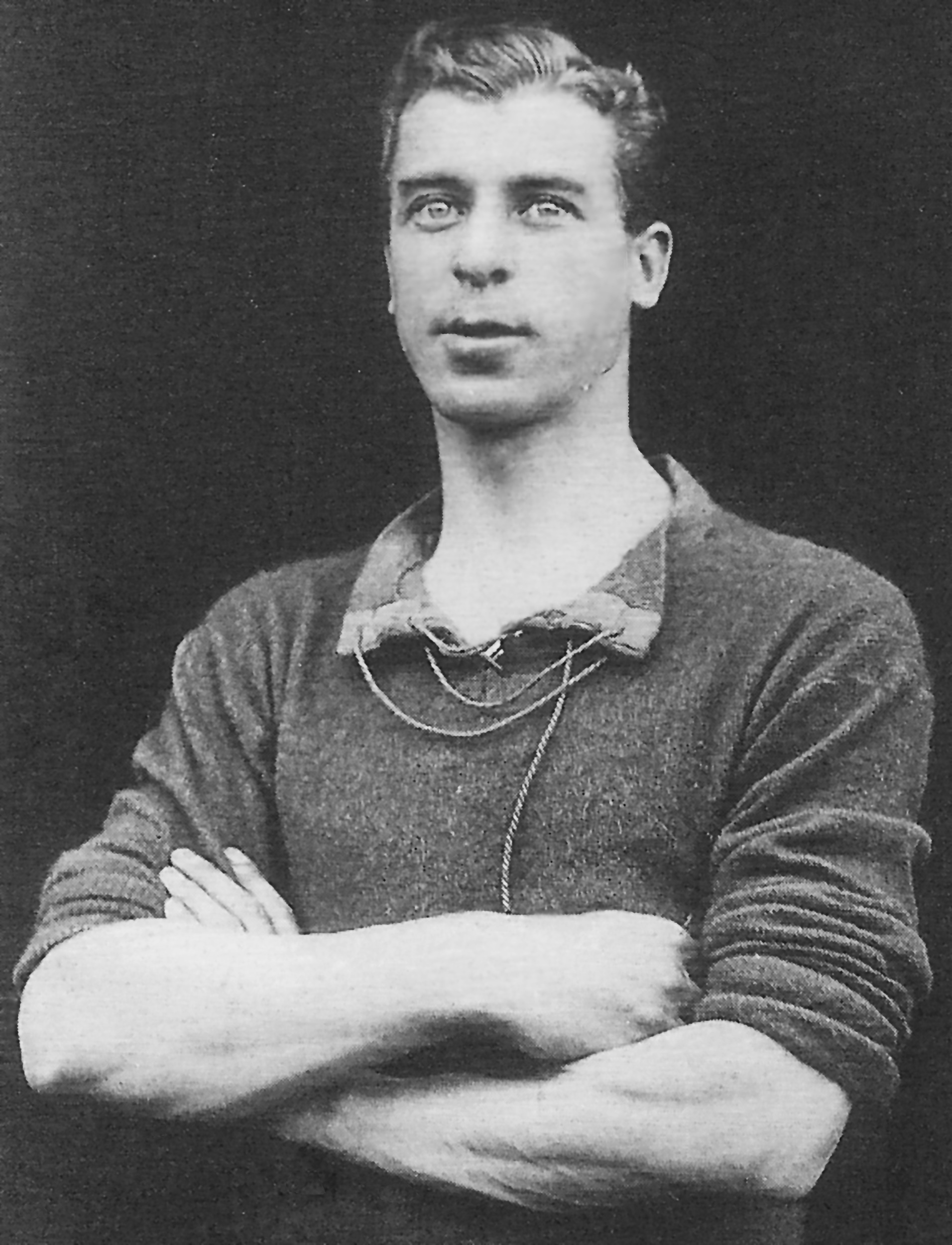
- Campbell in 1914

Personal information
- Date of birth: 14 October 1894
- Place of birth: Birkenhead, England
- Date of death: 3 October 1981 (aged 86)
- Place of death: Bebington, England
- Height: 5 ft 9 in (1.75 m)
- Position: Wing half

Senior career*
Years	Team	Apps	(Gls)
–1914	Ocean Athletic		
1914–1929	Tranmere Rovers	189	(10)
- * Club domestic league appearances and goals

Johnny Campbell (14 October 1894 – 3 October 1981) was an English footballer who played as a wing half for Ocean Athletic and Tranmere Rovers. He made 207 appearances for Tranmere, scoring 11 goals.
