= Brian Cripsey =

English footballer

Personal information
- Date of birth: 26 June 1931 (age 95)
- Place of birth: Hull, England
- Position: Left winger

Youth career
- Brunswick Institute

Senior career*
Years	Team	Apps	(Gls)
1952–1959	Hull City	145	(19)
1959–1960	Wrexham	27	(3)
- Bridlington Town
Total		172	(22)
- * Club domestic league appearances and goals

Brian Cripsey (born 26 June 1931) is an English former professional footballer who played as a left winger.

== Career ==
Born in Hull, Cripsey played for Brunswick Institute, Hull City, Wrexham and Bridlington Town.
