= Terry Mulvoy =

English footballer (1938–2020)

Personal information
- Date of birth: 2 December 1938
- Place of birth: Manchester, England
- Date of death: 28 September 2020 (aged 81)
- Place of death: Long Beach, California, United States
- Position: Forward

Senior career*
Years	Team	Apps	(Gls)
1957	Rochdale	2	(0)
1961–1962	Toronto Ulster United		
1961–1963	New York Ukrainians		
1966	Orange County Soccer Club		
1967–1968	Lynwood Falcons		
1969	St. Stephen A.C.		
1973	Scandia Soccer Club		
1974	St. Stephen A.C.		
- * Club domestic league appearances and goals

Terry Mulvoy (2 December 1938 – 28 September 2020) was an English footballer who played as a forward.

== Career ==
Mulvoy played in the Football League Third Division in 1957 with Rochdale A.F.C. He made two appearances for Rochdale throughout the season. In 1961, he played abroad in Canada's National Soccer League with Toronto Ulster United. He would play an additional season with Toronto in 1962. After the conclusion of the 1961 NSL season, he played the remainder of the year in the United States with New York Ukrainians.

In 1963, he returned to play in the German-American Soccer League with New York Ukrainians. In 1966, he returned to the United States to play in the regional California circuits originally with Orange County Soccer Club in the Continental Soccer League. In his debut season with Orange County, he played in a friendly match against FC Bayern Munich. He signed with Lynwood Falcons the following season and was named to the league All-Star team. When Lynwood joined the Greater Los Angeles Soccer League in 1968 he re-signed with the club.

In 1969, he signed with league rivals St. Stephen A.C. and was named the team captain. He played with Scandia Soccer Club for the 1973 season. The following season he played his final season with former club St. Stephen.

He died on 28 September 2020, in Long Beach, California.
