= Brian Bulless =

English footballer (born 1946)

Personal information
- Date of birth: 4 September 1933
- Place of birth: Kingston upon Hull, England
- Date of death: 7 December 2016 (aged 83)
- Place of death: Kingston upon Hull, England
- Position: Wing-half

Youth career
- 1949–1953: Hull City

Senior career*
Years	Team	Apps	(Gls)
1950–1964	Hull City	326	(30)
1964	Hull Brunswick		
- * Club domestic league appearances and goals

Brian Bulless (4 September 1933 – 7 December 2016) was an English footballer who played as a wing half and spent his entire professional career with Hull City. He also served with the RAF.

Bulless made 326 league appearances for the Tigers from 1953 to 1964 before being forced to retire through injury.

Bulless died on 7 December 2016 at the age of 83, leaving behind his three children and grandchildren.
