= Bill Lamont =

Scottish footballer (1926–1996)

Personal information
- Full name: William Turnbull Lamont
- Date of birth: 25 December 1926
- Place of birth: Glasgow, Scotland
- Date of death: 6 November 1996 (aged 69)
- Place of death: Glasgow, Scotland
- Position: Left back

Youth career
- –1947: Hugh McGowan Juveniles

Senior career*
Years	Team	Apps	(Gls)
1947–1950	Kilmarnock	18	(0)
1950–1951	New Brighton	27	(0)
1951–1956	Tranmere Rovers	143	(3)
1956–1957	Cowdenbeath	1	(0)
Total		189	(3)
- * Club domestic league appearances and goals

William Turnbull Lamont (25 December 1926 – 6 November 1996) was a Scottish footballer who played as left back for Kilmarnock, New Brighton, Tranmere Rovers and Cowdenbeath.
