= Jack Hogg (footballer, born 1931) =

English footballer

Personal information
- Full name: John Hogg
- Date of birth: 7 October 1931
- Place of birth: Blyth, England
- Date of death: 2001 (aged 69–70)
- Position: Winger

Senior career*
Years	Team	Apps	(Gls)
1949–1951	Sunderland	0	(0)
1951–1954	Blyth Spartans	?	(?)
1954–1955	Portsmouth	0	(0)
1955–1957	Peterborough United	22	(7)
1957–1960	Gateshead	80	(21)
1960–19??	Blyth Spartans	?	(?)
- * Club domestic league appearances and goals

John Hogg (7 October 1931 – 2001) was an English footballer who played as a winger.

Hogg started his career with Sunderland in 1949 before moving to local non-league side Blyth Spartans without having made an appearance. In 1954, Hogg signed for Portsmouth. Then once again, without making an appearance, Hogg moved into non-league football. This time with Peterborough United. Hogg finally made his Football League debut in 1957 when he signed for Gateshead. He went on to make 80 appearances for the Tynesiders, scoring 21 goals. Hogg moved back to Blyth Spartans after Gateshead were voted out of the league in favour of Peterborough United in 1960.

== Sources ==
- "allfootballers.com". Archived from the original on 22 July 2008.
- "Post War English & Scottish Football League A–Z Player's Transfer Database".
- "player history". Archived from the original on 15 September 2010.
