= Harold Bell (footballer) =

English footballer (1924–1994)

- Bell c. 1959

Personal information
- Date of birth: 22 November 1924
- Place of birth: Liverpool, England
- Date of death: 17 July 1994 (aged 69)
- Place of death: Liverpool, England
- Position: Centre half

Senior career*
Years	Team	Apps	(Gls)
1946–1959	Tranmere Rovers	595	(11)
- * Club domestic league appearances and goals

Harold Bell (22 November 1924 – 17 July 1994) was an English footballer who holds the record for the most consecutive appearances for a British football team.

Bell was picked for Tranmere Rovers in the first game after World War II in the 1946–47 season and did not miss a match until he was dropped on 30 August 1955, a total of 401 consecutive league matches for the team in Football League Third Division North. He also played in 26 FA Cup matches, 22 Liverpool Senior Cup and 10 Cheshire Bowl games, making a grand total of 459 appearances. In total he made 633 appearances, finally leaving the club for Holyhead Town in 1959.

== See also ==
- List of footballers in England by number of league appearances (500+)
