= John Tomlinson (footballer) =

English footballer

Personal information
- Date of birth: 26 June 1934
- Place of birth: Birkenhead, England
- Date of death: 4 February 2014 (aged 79)
- Place of death: Corby, Northamptonshire, England
- Position: Winger

Senior career*
Years	Team	Apps	(Gls)
1956–1957	Everton	2	(0)
1957–1959	Chesterfield	47	(5)
- Corby Town
Total		49	(5)
- * Club domestic league appearances and goals

John F. Tomlinson (26 June 1934 – 4 February 2014) was an English professional footballer who played as a winger.

== Career ==
Born in Birkenhead, Tomlinson played for Everton, Chesterfield and Corby Town.
