= Tommy Todd (footballer) =

Scottish footballer

Personal information
- Full name: Thomas Bell Todd
- Date of birth: 1 June 1926
- Place of birth: Stonehouse, Scotland
- Date of death: 7 December 2014 (aged 88)
- Place of death: Motherwell, Scotland
- Position: Centre forward

Youth career
- Burnbank Athletic
- 1946–1948: Motherwell

Senior career*
Years	Team	Apps	(Gls)
1948–1949	Airdrieonians	4	(0)
1949–1951	Stonehouse Violet		
1951–1955	Hamilton Academical	65	(24)
1955–1956	Crewe Alexandra	13	(3)
1956	Derby County	4	(3)
1956–1957	Rochdale	5	(1)
- Elgin City
Total		91	(31)
- * Club domestic league appearances and goals

Tommy Todd (1 June 1926 – 7 December 2014) was a Scottish footballer who played as a centre-forward for Airdrieonians and Hamilton Academical in the Scottish Football League and Crewe Alexandra, Derby County and Rochdale in the (English) Football League.
