= Jim Lovie =

Scottish footballer

Personal information
- Full name: James Theirs Harrison Lovie
- Date of birth: 19 September 1932 (age 94)
- Place of birth: Peterhead, Scotland
- Position: Left winger

Youth career
- Peterhead

Senior career*
Years	Team	Apps	(Gls)
1952–1953	Dundee United	6	(0)
1953–1957	Peterhead		
1957–1960	Bury	51	(10)
1960–1961	Bournemouth	9	(0)
1961–1964	Chesterfield	95	(7)
- * Club domestic league appearances and goals

James Theirs Harrison Lovie (born 19 September 1932) is a Scottish former footballer, who played as a left winger. Lovie began his career in the early 1950s with Dundee United before moving back to hometown club Peterhead, where he had begun his youth career. In 1957, Lovie headed south to join Bury, moving on to Bournemouth and Chesterfield before finishing his career in the lower leagues.
