= David Jones (footballer, born 1936) =

Welsh footballer

Personal information
- Full name: David Edward Jones
- Date of birth: 5 March 1936 (age 90)
- Place of birth: Saltney, Wales
- Position: Winger

Youth career
- Saltney Juniors
- Wrexham

Senior career*
| Years | Team | Apps | (Gls) |
| 1955–1959 | Wrexham | 71 | (11) |
| 1959–1960 | Crewe Alexandra | 2 | (0) |
- Bangor City
- * Club domestic league appearances and goals

David Edward Jones (born 5 March 1936) is a Welsh former professional footballer who played as a winger. He made appearances in the English football league for Wrexham and Crewe Alexandra.
