= Dick Platt =

English footballer

Personal information
- Place of birth: Huyton, England
- Height: 5 ft 8 1/2 in (1.74 m)
- Position: Right back

Senior career*
Years	Team	Apps	(Gls)
?–1932	Huyton Quarry	?	(?)
1932–1937	Tranmere Rovers	173	(0)
1937–?	Northampton Town	?	(?)
- * Club domestic league appearances and goals

Dick Platt was an English footballer who played as a right back for Huyton Quarry, Tranmere Rovers and Northampton Town. He made 193 appearances for Tranmere.
