= Les Samuels =

English footballer

Personal information
- Full name: Leslie Samuels
- Date of birth: 8 December 1928
- Place of birth: Oldham, England
- Date of death: 3 May 1998 (aged 69)
- Place of death: Burnley, England
- Position: Inside forward

Senior career*
Years	Team	Apps	(Gls)
1950–1953	Burnley	2	(0)
1953	Exeter City	12	(1)
1953–1954	Wrexham	26	(11)
1954–1955	Crewe Alexandra	40	(14)
1955–1958	Bradford City	84	(38)
1958–1959	Stockport County	25	(5)
Total		189	(69)
- * Club domestic league appearances and goals

Leslie Samuels (8 December 1928 – 3 May 1998) was an English footballer, who played as an inside forward.

Samuels began his career with Burnley, where he made only two league starts before adding another 12 at Exeter City scoring his first league goal. He moved to Wrexham and Crewe Alexandra before he moved to Bradford City in December 1955. It was at Bradford where he spent the majority of his career, making 84 appearances and scoring 38 goals. In his second season at City he was the club's top goal-scorer when he scored 19 goals from 43 games. He was on course to repeat the feat the following season until he left for Stockport County.
