= John McCole =

Scottish footballer

Personal information
- Full name: John McCole
- Date of birth: 18 September 1936
- Place of birth: Glasgow, Scotland
- Date of death: 1982 (aged 46)
- Place of death: Gweedore, County Donegal, Ireland
- Height: 1.78 m (5 ft 10 in)
- Position: Centre forward

Youth career
- –1956: Vale of Leven

Senior career*
Years	Team	Apps	(Gls)
1956–1958	Falkirk	31	(19)
1958–1959	Bradford City	42	(32)
1959–1961	Leeds United	85	(53)
1961	New York Americans		
1961–1962	Bradford City	46	(15)
1962–1963	Rotherham United	14	(5)
1963–1964	Shelbourne		
1964–1965	Newport County	6	(2)
- Cork Hibernians
- Dundalk
Total		217	(118)
- * Club domestic league appearances and goals

John McCole (18 September 1936 – 1982) was a Scottish professional footballer who played in Scotland, England, Ireland, Wales and the United States.

== Career ==
Born in Glasgow, Scotland, McCole began his career with Vale of Leven before signing a professional contract with Falkirk in 1956. McCole moved to England in 1958 to play with Bradford City, Leeds United (where he scored 45 goals in 78 league appearances, but was unable to prevent Leeds from being relegated from the First Division; McCole also set a club record by scoring four goals in the League Cup match against Brentford before returning to Bradford in October 1961) and Rotherham United, before spending a year in Ireland with Shelbourne. McCole returned to Britain to play for Newport County – a Welsh team playing in the English league – before returning to Ireland to play with Cork Hibernians and Dundalk.

McCole also spent the summer of 1961 in the United States with the New York Americans, scoring seven goals in the process.
