= Dave Moorcroft (footballer) =

English footballer

Personal information
- Date of birth: 16 March 1947 (age 79)
- Place of birth: Liverpool, England
- Position: Centre back

Youth career
- 1961–1962: Liverpool schoolboys
- 1962–1967: Everton

Senior career*
Years	Team	Apps	(Gls)
1967	Preston North End	8	(0)
1967–1968	Skelmersdale United	65	(8)
1968–1969	Dallas Tornado	86	(3)
1969–1973	Tranmere Rovers	108	(1)
- * Club domestic league appearances and goals

Dave Moorcroft (born 16 March 1947) is an English former footballer who played as centre back for Skelmersdale United, Dallas Tornado in the North American Soccer League, and Tranmere Rovers.
