= Bill Tulip =

English footballer

Bull Tulip
Personal information
- Full name: William Edward Tulip
- Date of birth: 3 May 1933
- Place of birth: Gateshead, England
- Date of death: December 2013 (aged 80)
- Place of death: Gateshead, England
- Position: Forward

Senior career*
Years	Team	Apps	(Gls)
1951–1956	Newcastle United	0	(0)
1956–1958	Darlington	44	(34)
Total		44	(34)
- * Club domestic league appearances and goals

William Edward Tulip (3 May 1933 – December 2013) was an English former professional footballer who played in the Football League as a forward for Darlington between 1956 & 1958 before retiring due to injury.
