= Percy Thirkell =

English footballer

Personal information
- Date of birth: 13 February 1900
- Place of birth: Tyne Dock, England
- Date of death: 16 January 1997 (aged 96)
- Place of death: Bolton, England
- Height: 5 ft 11 1/2 in (1.82 m)
- Position: Left back

Senior career*
| Years | Team | Apps | (Gls) |
| –1925 | Bolton Wanderers | | |
| 1925–1930 | Tranmere Rovers | 175 | (0) |
| 1930–1931 | Congleton Town | 12 | (0) |
- * Club domestic league appearances and goals

Percy Thirkell (13 February 1900 – 16 January 1997) was an English footballer who played as a left back for Bolton Wanderers, Tranmere Rovers and Congleton Town. He made 184 appearances for Tranmere.
