= Tom Stuart (footballer) =

English footballer

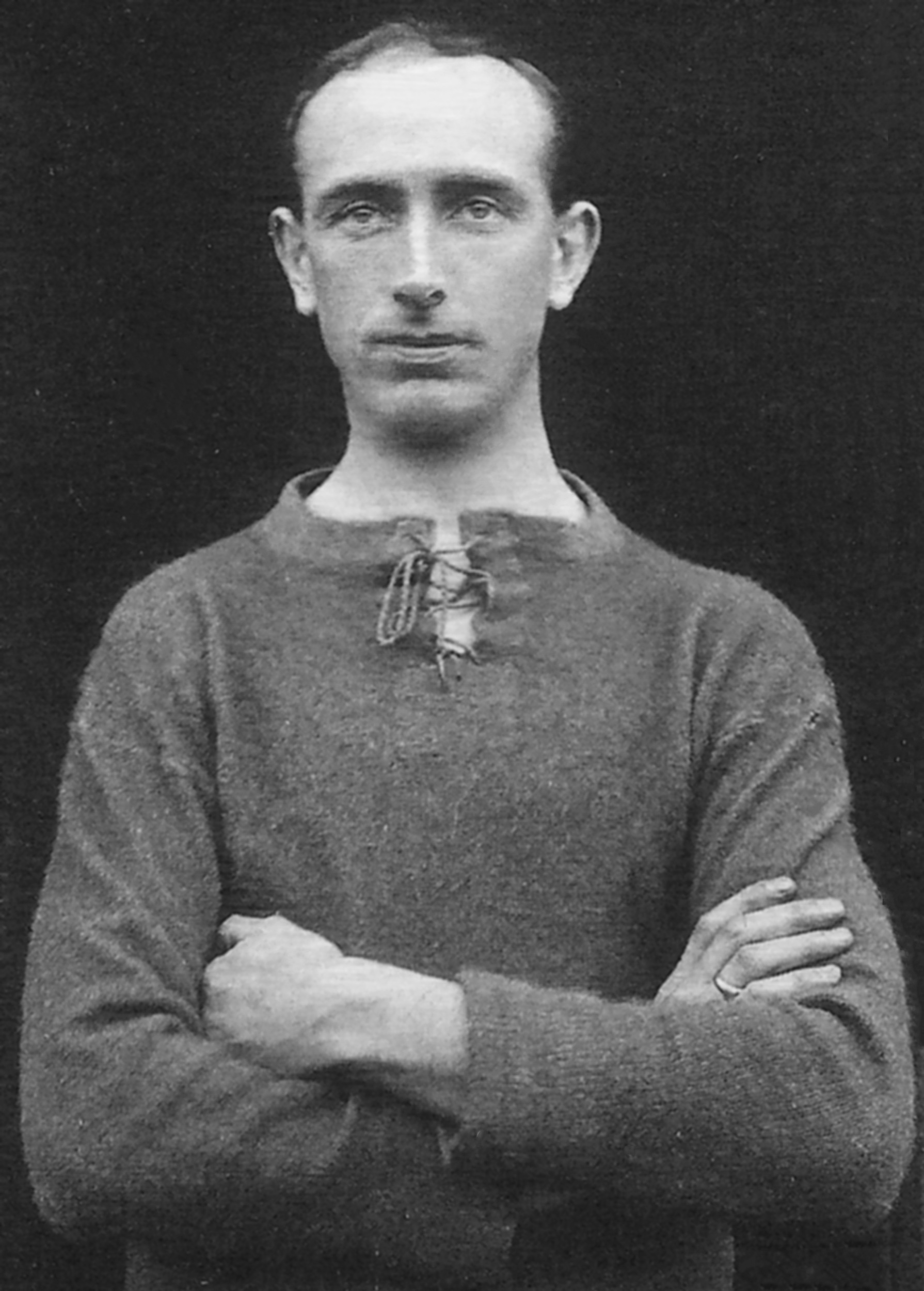
- Stuart in 1921

Personal information
- Date of birth: 25 October 1893
- Place of birth: Liverpool, England
- Date of death: 10 February 1957 (aged 63)
- Place of death: Crosby, England
- Height: 5 ft 9 1/2 in (1.77 m)
- Position: Left back

Senior career*
Years	Team	Apps	(Gls)
–1921	Bootle Albion		
1921–1927	Tranmere Rovers	192	(13)
- * Club domestic league appearances and goals

Tom Stuart (25 October 1893 – 10 February 1957) was an English footballer who played as a left back for Bootle Albion and Tranmere Rovers. He made 205 appearances for Tranmere, scoring 13 goals.
