= Bobby Entwistle =

English footballer

Personal information
- Full name: Robert Peter Entwistle
- Date of birth: 6 October 1938 (age 88)
- Place of birth: Bury, England
- Date of death: March 2000 (aged 61)
- Place of death: New Forest, England
- Height: 5 ft 7 in (1.70 m)
- Position: Forward

Senior career*
Years	Team	Apps	(Gls)
1958	Macclesfield Town	3	(1)
1958–1959	Rochdale	1	(0)
1960–1961	Accrington Stanley	2	(0)
1961–1964	Llandudno		
1964–1965	Hartlepools United	14	(3)
1965–1967	Scarborough		
- * Club domestic league appearances and goals

Robert Peter Entwistle (6 October 1938 – March 2000) was an English professional footballer who played as a forward in the Football League for Rochdale, Accrington Stanley and Hartlepools United.
