= Albert Stokes =

English footballer (1933–2014)

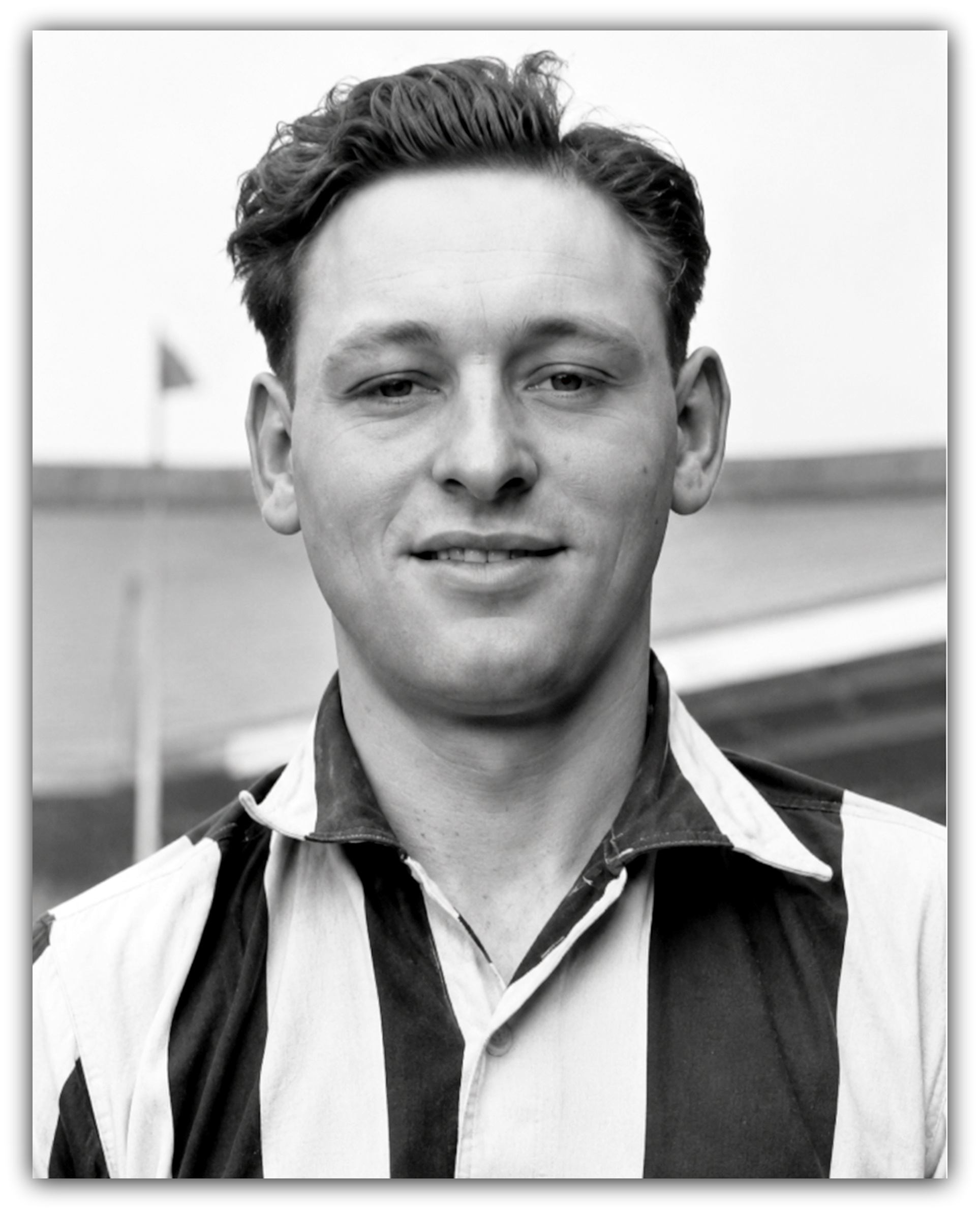

Personal information
- Full name: Albert William Stokes
- Date of birth: 26 January 1933
- Place of birth: Darnall, England
- Date of death: 1 May 2014 (aged 81)
- Place of death: Grimsby, England
- Height: 5 ft 11 in (1.80 m)
- Position: Forward

Senior career*
Years	Team	Apps	(Gls)
1949–1951	Rotherham United	0	(0)
1951–1952	Frickley Colliery		
1952–1953	Guildford City		
1953–1954	Hampton Sports		
1954–1957	Grimsby Town	16	(3)
1957–1959	Scunthorpe & Lindsey United	5	(2)
1959	Southport	6	(2)
1959–1960	Chelmsford City		
1960	Gravesend & Northfleet	1	(0)
1961	Ashford Town	10	(2)
1961	Loughborough		
1961–196?	Spalding United		
- * Club domestic league appearances and goals

Albert William Stokes (26 January 1933 – 1 May 2014) was an English professional footballer who played as a forward.

After previously playing for several non-League clubs, Stokes played 27 matches between 1954 and 1959 in the lower divisions of the Football League for Grimsby Town, Scunthorpe & Lindsey United (where he was a member of their 1957–1958 promotion winning squad) and Southport scoring a total of 7 goals. Thereafter his playing career continued with clubs at the non-league level.
