= Billy Duff =

English footballer

Personal information
- Full name: William Francis Andrew Duff
- Date of birth: 16 December 1938
- Place of birth: Littleborough, England
- Date of death: 25 March 2002 (aged 63)
- Place of death: Rochdale, England
- Position: Left winger

Senior career*
Years	Team	Apps	(Gls)
1956–1958	Rochdale	0	(0)
1958–1960	Scunthorpe United	0	(0)
1960	Polish White Eagles (Toronto)		
1960	Grimsby Town	3	(1)
1960–1961	Accrington Stanley	14	(3)
1961–1963	Runcorn		
1963–1964	Rossendale United	15	(3)
Total		17	(4)
- * Club domestic league appearances and goals

William Francis Andrew Duff (16 December 1938 — 25 March 2002) was an English professional footballer who played as a left winger in the Football League.
