= Jack Bertolini =

Scottish footballer and manager (1934–2021)

Personal information
- Full name: John Bertolini
- Date of birth: 21 March 1934
- Place of birth: Alloa, Scotland
- Date of death: 21 June 2021 (aged 87)
- Place of death: Worthing, England
- Position: Wing half

Youth career
- Alva Albion Rangers

Senior career*
Years	Team	Apps	(Gls)
1951–1952	Stirling Albion	19	(4)
1952–1958	Workington	183	(36)
1958–1966	Brighton & Hove Albion	258	(12)
Total		460	(52)

Managerial career
- 1970–1971: Whitehawk
- * Club domestic league appearances and goals

John Bertolini (21 March 1934 – 21 June 2021) was a Scottish professional footballer who played as a wing half. He was later a manager.

== Career ==
Born in Alloa, of Italian descent, Bertolini played for Alva Albion Rangers, Stirling Albion, Workington and Brighton & Hove Albion.

Signed by Albion manager Billy Lane, Bertolini played at right half and had a spell of 193 consecutive appearances during his career at the Goldstone. A knee-ligament injury while turning out for the reserves ended his career in October 1965.

After retiring, he managed Whitehawk ran a pub in Shoreham-by-Sea, West Sussex, and worked in the car and van hire business.

He suffered from dementia and spent the last eight years of his life in a care home in Worthing, where he died on 21 June 2021, aged 87.
