= Willie Marshall (Scottish footballer) =

Scottish footballer (1933–2021)

Personal information
- Full name: William Forsyth Marshall
- Date of birth: 9 May 1933
- Place of birth: Rutherglen, Scotland
- Date of death: December 2021 (aged 88)
- Place of death: Derbyshire, England
- Position: Centre forward

Senior career*
Years	Team	Apps	(Gls)
- Rutherglen Glencairn
1957–1959	Bradford City	33	(16)
1959–1960	Swindon Town	30	(12)
- Chesterfield
Total		63	(28)
- * Club domestic league appearances and goals

William Forsyth Marshall (9 May 1933 – December 2021) was a Scottish professional footballer who played as a centre forward.

== Career ==
Born in Rutherglen, Marshall joined Bradford City from Rutherglen Glencairn in January 1957. He made 33 league appearances for the club, scoring 16 goals; he also played in 1 FA Cup match, scoring 3 goals. He left the club in February 1959 to join Swindon Town, for whom he made 30 league appearances (scoring 1 goal), as well as 1 League Cup game, before moving to Chesterfield.

== Death ==
Marshall died in Derbyshire, England in December 2021, at the age of 88.

== Sources ==
- Frost, Terry (1988). Bradford City A Complete Record 1903-1988. Breedon Books Sport. ISBN 0-907969-38-0.
