= Eddie Flood =

English footballer

Eddie Flood (born 19 November 1952 in Liverpool) is a footballer who played as left back for Liverpool F.C. Tranmere Rovers and York City.
