= Clive Baker (footballer, born 1934) =

English footballer and manager

Personal information
- Full name: Clive Baker
- Date of birth: 5 July 1934
- Place of birth: Adwick le Street, England
- Date of death: 20 February 2012 (aged 77)
- Place of death: Rotherham, England
- Position: Forward

Youth career
- –1952: Intake

Senior career*
Years	Team	Apps	(Gls)
1952–1955	Doncaster Rovers	0	(0)
1955–1959	Halifax Town	58	(22)
1959–1960	Southport	0	(0)
1960–	Buxton		
Total		58	(22)

Managerial career
- 1975: York City (caretaker)
- * Club domestic league appearances and goals

Clive Baker (5 July 1934 – 20 February 2012) was an English professional footballer who played as a forward in the Football League for Doncaster Rovers, Halifax Town and Southport and in non-League football for Buxton.

== Career ==
Born in Adwick le Street, West Riding of Yorkshire, Baker started his career with local youth side Intake before joining hometown club Doncaster Rovers in 1952. He failed to make an appearance for the club and joined Football League Third Division North side Halifax Town in 1955. In his four years with the club he made 58 league appearances scoring 22 goals. He left in 1959 to join Football League Fourth Division side Southport but failed to appear for the first team, leaving in 1960. He then dropped into non-league football with Cheshire County League side Buxton.

After retiring from full-time football he moved into coaching, where his first job was with Halifax Town. He later became first-team coach under manager Jim McAnearney at Rotherham United. He also spent time as a coach with Hartlepool United and York City, and served as caretaker manager at the latter from January to February 1975. He moved to Norway as a coach for a year in 1977. He also coached abroad in Canada, United States and South Africa. In November 1984, Sheffield Wednesday manager Howard Wilkinson appointed Baker to his backroom staff as chief scout. He stayed with the club for eighteen years working his way up to Youth Academy Director before retiring in 2001.

== Death ==
Baker died on 20 February 2012 in Rotherham, South Yorkshire at the age of 77.

== Managerial statistics ==
Managerial record by team and tenure
Team	From	To	Record					Ref
Team	From	To	P	W	D	L	Win %	Ref
York City (caretaker)	11 January 1975	15 February 1975	4	2	1	1	50.0	
Total			4	2	1	1	50.0	—
