= Ken Booth (footballer) =

English footballer

Personal information
- Full name: Kenneth Kershaw Booth
- Date of birth: 22 November 1934
- Place of birth: Blackpool, England
- Date of death: 7 November 2015 (aged 80)
- Position: Inside forward

Senior career*
Years	Team	Apps	(Gls)
1956–1957	Blackpool	1	(1)
1957–1959	Bradford Park Avenue	45	(14)
1959–1960	Workington	30	(13)
1960–1961	Southport	26	(7)
1961–1962	Wigan Athletic	12	(7)
- * Club domestic league appearances and goals

Kenneth Kershaw Booth (22 November 1934 – 7 November 2015) was an English footballer who played as an inside forward. He played over 100 matches in the Football League for several clubs.

== Career ==
Booth started his senior career with his hometown club Blackpool and scored in his single League appearance for the side. In 1957 he joined Bradford Park Avenue and went on to play 45 games for the team, scoring fourteen times. Spells at Workington and Southport followed over the next two seasons before Booth moved into non-League football with Wigan Athletic in 1961, where he scored 7 goals in 12 Cheshire League games.
