= David Boyle (footballer) =

English footballer

Personal information
- Full name: David Walker Boyle
- Date of birth: 24 April 1929
- Place of birth: North Shields, England
- Date of death: 16 November 2009 (aged 80)
- Place of death: Bradford, England
- Position: Inside forward

Senior career*
Years	Team	Apps	(Gls)
1947–1949	Newcastle United	0	(0)
1949–1950	Berwick Rangers	?	(?)
1950–1952	Barnsley	0	(0)
1952–1954	Crewe Alexandra	35	(3)
1954–1956	Chesterfield	42	(10)
1956–1961	Bradford City	92	(13)
1961–1962	Scarborough	?	(?)
1962–1966	Bacup Borough	?	(?)
Total		169	(26)
- * Club domestic league appearances and goals

David Walker Boyle (24 April 1929 – 16 November 2009) was an English professional footballer who played as an inside forward for Newcastle United, Berwick Rangers, Barnsley, Crewe Alexandra, Chesterfield, Bradford City, Scarborough and Bacup Borough.
