= Ray Williams (footballer, born 1930) =

English footballer (born 1930)

Personal information
- Full name: William Raymond Williams
- Date of birth: 30 December 1930
- Place of birth: Bebington, England
- Position: Wing half

Senior career*
Years	Team	Apps	(Gls)
1951–1959	Tranmere Rovers	197	(12)
- Ramblers
Total		197	(12)
- * Club domestic league appearances and goals

William Raymond Williams (born 30 December 1930) is an English former professional footballer who played for Tranmere Rovers.
