= Wilf Charlton =

English footballer

Personal information
- Full name: Wilfred Sydney Charlton
- Date of birth: 12 September 1933
- Place of birth: Blyth, England
- Date of death: January 2016 (aged 82)
- Place of death: Kirklees, England
- Position: Wing half

Senior career*
Years	Team	Apps	(Gls)
	Portsmouth	0	(0)
1950–54	Huddersfield Town	0	(0)
1954–57	Southport	109	(8)
1957–61	Tranmere Rovers	92	(4)
1961–	Sankeys		
Total		201	(12)
- * Club domestic league appearances and goals

Wilfred Sydney Charlton (12 September 1933 – January 2016) was an English footballer who played as a wing half in the Football League for Southport and Tranmere Rovers. He was on the books of Portsmouth and Huddersfield Town without representing either in the League, and also played for Sankeys.
