= Paddy Sowden =

English footballer

Personal information
- Full name: Peter Tasker Sowden
- Date of birth: 1 May 1929
- Place of birth: Bradford, England
- Date of death: 12 November 2010 (aged 81)
- Place of death: Cambridge, England
- Position: Inside forward

Senior career*
| Years | Team | Apps | (Gls) |
| 1946–1947 | Blackpool | 0 | (0) |
| 1947–1948 | Bacup Borough | | |
| 1948–1949 | Hull City | 0 | (0) |
| 1949–1950 | Elgin City | | |
| 1950–1951 | Aldershot | 4 | (0) |
| 1951–1952 | Hull City | 0 | (0) |
| 1952–1956 | Gillingham | 134 | (27) |
| 1956–1958 | Accrington Stanley | 54 | (13) |
| 1958–1960 | Wrexham | 38 | (4) |
| 1960–? | Chorley | | |
- * Club domestic league appearances and goals

Peter Tasker Sowden (1 May 1929 – 12 November 2010) was an English professional footballer. His clubs included Aldershot, Accrington Stanley, Wrexham and Gillingham, where he made over 130 Football League appearances.

He also played for Chorley, Great Harwood and Mossley.
