= Harold Lloyd (footballer) =

Welsh footballer (1920–1984)

Harold Demayne Lloyd
Personal information
- Date of birth: 12 March 1920
- Place of birth: Flint, Flintshire, Wales
- Date of death: 1984 (aged 63–64)
- Place of death: Rhuddlan, Wales
- Position: Goalkeeper

Senior career*
Years	Team	Apps	(Gls)
?–1945	Flint Town		
1945–1957	Tranmere Rovers	188	(0)
1957–?	Runcorn		
- * Club domestic league appearances and goals

Harold Demayne Lloyd (12 March 1920 – 1984) was a Welsh footballer who played as a goalkeeper for Flint Town, Tranmere Rovers and Runcorn. He made 203 appearances for Tranmere.
