= Bobby Tynan =

English footballer

Personal information
- Full name: Bobby Tynan
- Date of birth: 7 December 1955 (age 70)
- Place of birth: Liverpool, England
- Height: 5 ft 10 in (1.78 m)
- Position: Midfielder

Senior career*
Years	Team	Apps	(Gls)
1972–1978	Tranmere Rovers	195	(26)
1977	→ Chicago Sting (loan)	15	(2)
1978–	Blackpool		

International career
1973	England Youth	3	(0)
- * Club domestic league appearances and goals

Bobby Tynan (born 7 December 1955, in Liverpool) is a footballer who played in midfielder for Tranmere Rovers and Blackpool.
