= Harry Darbyshire =

English footballer

Personal information
- Date of birth: 22 October 1931
- Place of birth: Leeds, England
- Date of death: 17 June 1991 (aged 59)
- Place of death: Leeds, England
- Positions: Centre forward; right half

Youth career
- Leeds United

Senior career*
Years	Team	Apps	(Gls)
1950–1952	Leeds United	0	(0)
1952–1957	Halifax Town	162	(32)
1957–1959	Bury	29	(12)
1959–1960	Darlington	15	(2)
Total		206	(46)
- * Club domestic league appearances and goals

Harry Darbyshire (22 October 1931 – 17 June 1991) was an English footballer who played in the Football League for Leeds United, Halifax Town, Bury and Darlington. He played at centre forward or right half.
