= Clive Evans (footballer) =

English footballer

Personal information
- Full name: Andrew Clive Evans
- Date of birth: 1 May 1957 (age 69)
- Place of birth: Heswall, England
- Height: 5 ft 10 in (1.78 m)
- Position: Midfielder

Senior career*
Years	Team	Apps	(Gls)
1976–1981	Tranmere Rovers	178	(26)
1981–1982	Wigan Athletic	32	(2)
1982–1983	Crewe Alexandra	28	(7)
1983–1988	Stockport County	160	(23)
1988–1989	Lincoln City	42	(2)
1989–	Bangor City		
Total		440	(60)
- * Club domestic league appearances and goals

Andrew Clive Evans (born 1 May 1957) is an English former footballer who played as midfielder for Tranmere Rovers, Wigan Athletic, Crewe Alexandra, Stockport County and Lincoln City. He now lives in West Kirby with his family and is employed in the sports promotion industry.
