= Gren Jones (footballer) =

English footballer

Personal information
- Date of birth: 23 November 1932
- Place of birth: Nuneaton, England
- Date of death: 15 October 1991 (aged 58)
- Place of death: Wrexham, Wales
- Position: Right winger

Senior career*
| Years | Team | Apps | (Gls) |
| 1953–1955 | West Bromwich Albion | 2 | (0) |
| 1955–1961 | Wrexham | 241 | (36) |
- Prague (Australia)
| Total | | 243 | (36) |
- * Club domestic league appearances and goals

Gren Jones (23 November 1932 – 15 October 1991) was an English professional footballer who played as a right winger.

== Career ==
Born in Nuneaton, Jones played for West Bromwich Albion, Wrexham and Prague (Australia).
