= Bobby Conroy =

Scottish footballer (1929–1978)

Personal information
- Date of birth: 20 June 1929
- Place of birth: Kirkintilloch, Scotland
- Date of death: 1978 (aged 48–49)
- Place of death: Rochdale, England
- Position: Full back

Senior career*
| Years | Team | Apps | (Gls) |
| 1955–62 | Bury | 216 | (2) |
| 1962–65 | Tranmere Rovers | 103 | (1) |
| Total | | 319 | (3) |
- * Club domestic league appearances and goals

Robert Bell Conroy (20 June 1929 – 1978) was a Scottish footballer who played as full back for Bury and Tranmere Rovers.
