= Derek Jones (footballer) =

English footballer

Personal information
- Date of birth: 24 April 1929
- Place of birth: Little Sutton, England
- Date of death: 26 October 2006 (aged 77)
- Place of death: Ellesmere Port, England
- Position: Right back

Senior career*
Years	Team	Apps	(Gls)
–1961	Ellesmere Port		
1953–61	Tranmere Rovers	155	(19)
1961–	Runcorn		
Total		155	(19)
- * Club domestic league appearances and goals

Derek Jones (24 April 1929 – 26 October 2006) was an English footballer who played as right back for Tranmere Rovers.
