= Dave Philpotts =

English footballer and manager

Personal information
- Full name: David Ronald Philpotts
- Date of birth: 31 March 1954 (age 72)
- Place of birth: Bromborough, Cheshire, England
- Position: Defender

Senior career*
| Years | Team | Apps | (Gls) |
| 1972–1974 | Coventry City | 3 | (0) |
| 1973–1974 | → Southport (loan) | 8 | (0) |
| 1974–1978 | Tranmere Rovers | 175 | (5) |
| 1981–1983 | Carolina Lightnin' | | |
| 1983–1985 | Tranmere Rovers | 36 | (5) |
- * Club domestic league appearances and goals

David Ronald Philpotts (born 31 March 1954) is an English retired professional footballer who played as a defender.

Philpotts began his career with Coventry City in 1972. He played only three games with the first team over two seasons. He went on loan to Southport FC during the 1973–1974 season. In 1974, he transferred to Tranmere Rovers where he became a fixture on the back line. In 1981, he moved to the Carolina Lightnin', which was playing its first season of existence, of the American Soccer League. He was back in England with Tranmere in 1983. He ended his career with two games during the 1984–1985 season.

After retiring, he briefly managed the Wigan Athletic during part of the 1993 campaign.

He was employed as Tranmere's Chief Scout until retiring in May 2014, ending an association with the club that lasted over 40 years.
