= Dickie Johnson =

English footballer (born 1953)

Personal information
- Date of birth: 20 February 1953 (age 73)
- Place of birth: Liverpool, England
- Position: Goalkeeper

Senior career*
Years	Team	Apps	(Gls)
1971–1982	Tranmere Rovers	355	(0)
1982–	Altrincham		
- South Liverpool
Total		355	(0)
- * Club domestic league appearances and goals

Dickie Johnson (born 20 February 1953) is an English footballer who played as a goalkeeper for Tranmere Rovers, Altrincham and South Liverpool. He made 397 appearances for Tranmere keeping 109 clean sheets.

He made his debut on 24 September 1971 at the age of 18 in a goalless draw against Bolton Wanderers and, on 2 October 1973, played in the Tranmere team which beat Arsenal 1–0 at Highbury in a second round League Cup tie. Johnson played his last game for Tranmere in a 2–2 draw against Mansfield Town on Boxing Day 1981; he was awarded a testimonial match for his service to Rovers in May 1982, in which he scored the equaliser from the penalty spot in a 1–1 draw against Everton.

Following his football career, Johnson became head of sports development for Liverpool City Council.
