= Dave Pearson (footballer) =

Scottish footballer (1932–2019)

Personal information
- Full name: David Thomson Pearson
- Date of birth: 9 November 1932
- Place of birth: Dunfermline, Scotland
- Date of death: July 2019 (aged 86)
- Place of death: Blackburn, Lancashire, England
- Position: Inside forward

Senior career*
Years	Team	Apps	(Gls)
1949–1954	Blackburn Rovers	0	(0)
1954–1955	Ipswich Town	0	(0)
1955–1956	Darwen	20	(14)
1956–1957	Oldham Athletic	25	(12)
1957–1958	Rochdale	32	(17)
1958–1959	Crewe Alexandra	9	(2)
1959–1960	Chorley	30	(22)
Total		140	(87)
- * Club domestic league appearances and goals

David Thomson Pearson (9 November 1932 – July 2019), was a Scottish footballer who played as an inside forward in the English Football League. Dave scored a hat-trick on his Oldham Athletic debut
