= Reg Lloyd (Australian footballer) =

Australian rules footballer

Personal information
- Full name: Harry Reginald Lloyd
- Born: 9 July 1899
- Died: 23 May 1976 (aged 76)
- Original team: Canterbury
- Height: 170 cm (5 ft 7 in)
- Weight: 58 kg (128 lb)

Playing career^{1}
| Years | Club | Games (Goals) |
| 1921 | Collingwood | 1 (0) |
- ^{1} Playing statistics correct to the end of 1921.

Harry Reginald Lloyd (9 July 1899 – 23 May 1976) was an Australian rules footballer who played with Collingwood in the Victorian Football League (VFL).
