= Bernard Evans (footballer) =

English footballer (1937–2019)

Personal information
- Date of birth: 4 January 1937
- Place of birth: Chester, England
- Date of death: 24 July 2019 (aged 82)
- Position: Forward

Senior career*
Years	Team	Apps	(Gls)
1954–1960	Wrexham	114	(47)
1960–1962	Queens Park Rangers	78	(35)
1962–1963	Oxford United	13	(3)
1963–1964	Tranmere Rovers	12	(5)
1964–????	Crewe Alexandra	0	(0)
- Guildford City
Total		217	(90)
- * Club domestic league appearances and goals

Bernard Evans (4 January 1937 – 24 July 2019) was an English footballer who played for Oxford United, Wrexham, Queens Park Rangers, Tranmere Rovers and Crewe Alexandra.
