= Keith Williams (footballer, born 1937) =

Footballer

Personal information
- Date of birth: 14 January 1937 (age 89)
- Place of birth: Eastham, England
- Position: Inside forward

Senior career*
Years	Team	Apps	(Gls)
1954–1957	Everton	0	(0)
1957–1961	Tranmere Rovers	161	(88)
1961	Plymouth Argyle	10	(4)
1961–1962	Bristol Rovers	49	(18)
Total		220	(110)
- * Club domestic league appearances and goals

Keith Williams (born 14 January 1937) is a footballer who played as inside forward for Everton, Tranmere Rovers, Plymouth Argyle and Bristol Rovers. Williams joined Everton from school, but transferred to Tranmere in May 1957, joining his brother Ray there. He scored 88 goals in 161 Football League appearances during his four seasons at Tranmere, but conflict with manager Walter Galbraith led to his being transfer-listed. Williams moved to Plymouth at the end of the 1960–61 season, then to Bristol Rovers soon after. He was then banned due to the 1964 British football match-fixing scandal. In 1962, Keith moved with Ray to South Africa to set up business there.
