= Eugene Wilson (English footballer) =

English footballer

Personal information
- Date of birth: 11 September 1932
- Place of birth: Sheffield, England
- Date of death: 2006 (aged 73–74)
- Place of death: Sheffield, England
- Position: Winger

Senior career*
Years	Team	Apps	(Gls)
	Sheffield Wednesday	0	(0)
1953–1954	Rotherham United	0	(0)
1954–1962	Stockport County	223	(42)
- Altrincham
- Wigan Athletic
- * Club domestic league appearances and goals

Eugene "Gene" Wilson (11 September 1932 – March 2006) was an English professional footballer who played as a winger.

== Career ==
Born in Sheffield, Wilson played for Sheffield Wednesday, Rotherham United, Stockport County and Altrincham. He also played for Wigan Athletic in the 1963–64 season.
