= Eddie Wainwright =

English footballer

Personal information
- Full name: Edward Francis Wainwright
- Date of birth: 22 June 1924
- Place of birth: Southport, England
- Date of death: 2005 (aged 80–81)
- Position: Forward

Senior career*
Years	Team	Apps	(Gls)
1939	High Park		
1946–1956	Everton	207	(68)
1956–1959	Rochdale	100	(27)
Total		307	(95)
- * Club domestic league appearances and goals

Eddie Wainwright (22 June 1924 – 30 September 2005) was an English footballer who played in the Football League for Everton and Rochdale.

Wainwright first signed for Everton in 1939, but his first professional appearance was after World War II. In the 1949–50 season he was the leading goal scorer.

In 1951 he suffered a serious leg injury which almost ended his career, but he returned for four more seasons with Everton.

In 1956, Wainwright transferred to Rochdale, where he made exactly 100 league appearances over 3 seasons, before his retirement.

Wainwright died on 30 September 2005.
