= Jimmy McGuigan =

Scottish footballer and manager

Personal information
- Full name: James McGuigan
- Date of birth: 1 March 1924
- Place of birth: Addiewell, West Lothian, Scotland
- Date of death: 30 March 1988 (aged 64)
- Place of death: Chesterfield, Derbyshire, England
- Position: Wing half

Senior career*
Years	Team	Apps	(Gls)
- Bonnyrigg Rose Athletic
1946–1947	Hamilton Academical	11	(4)
1947–1949	Sunderland	3	(1)
1949–1950	Stockport County	43	(9)
1950–1956	Crewe Alexandra	207	(32)
1956–1959	Rochdale	70	(2)
Total		334	(48)

Managerial career
- 1960–1964: Crewe Alexandra
- 1964–1967: Grimsby Town
- 1967–1973: Chesterfield
- 1973–1979: Rotherham United
- 1979–1982: Stockport County
- * Club domestic league appearances and goals

James McGuigan (1 March 1924 – 30 March 1988) was a Scottish professional football player and manager.

== Career ==
=== Playing career ===
McGuigan, who played as a wing half, played junior football with Bonnyrigg Rose Athletic, before turning professional in 1946 with Hamilton Academical. After just one season in the Scottish Football League, McGuigan moved to England, playing in the Football League for Sunderland, Stockport County, Crewe Alexandra and Rochdale. McGuigan made a total of 334 League appearances between 1946 and 1959, scoring 48 goals.

=== Coaching career ===
After retiring as a player in 1959, McGuigan became a coach at former club Crewe Alexandra, before becoming manager in March 1960. After leaving Crewe in 1964, he later managed Grimsby Town, Chesterfield, Rotherham United and Stockport County. At Chesterfield, McGuigan won the 1969-70 Fourth Division title; he won the Manager of the Year award the same year.

== Managerial stats ==
Team	Nat	From	To	Record				
Team	Nat	From	To	P	W	D	L	Win %
Crewe Alexandra	(England)	1 June 1960	1 November 1964	222	87	50	85	39.19
Grimsby Town	(England)	1 November 1964	1 July 1967	143	50	41	52	34.97
Chesterfield	(England)	18 July 1967	1 May 1973	305	124	76	105	40.66
Rotherham United	(England)	1 May 1973	13 November 1979	337	129	90	118	38.28
Stockport County	(England)	13 November 1979	23 April 1982	130	40	29	61	30.77
Total				1,137	430	286	421	37.82

== See also ==
- List of football managers with the most matches
