= Charlie Ferguson (footballer, born 1930) =

Scottish footballer (1930–2017)

Personal information
- Full name: Charles Ferguson
- Date of birth: 22 April 1930
- Place of birth: Glasgow, Scotland
- Date of death: April 2017 (aged 86–87)
- Place of death: Lincolnshire, England
- Position: Right back

Youth career
- Benburb

Senior career*
Years	Team	Apps	(Gls)
1952–1953	Heart of Midlothian	10	(0)
1953–1954	Hamilton Academical	10	(0)
1954–1955	Accrington Stanley	1	(0)
1955–1959	Rochdale	150	(3)
1959–1961	Oldham Athletic	57	(0)
1961–1962	Rossendale United	67	(0)
Total		219	(3)
- * Club domestic league appearances and goals

Charles Ferguson (22 April 1930 – April 2017) was a Scottish professional footballer, who played as a right back in the Football League.
