= Jackie Grant (footballer) =

English footballer

Personal information
- Full name: John Albert Grant
- Date of birth: 8 September 1924
- Place of birth: Gateshead, England
- Date of death: August 1999 (aged 74)
- Place of death: Liverpool, England
- Position: Defender

Senior career*
Years	Team	Apps	(Gls)
1946–1954	Everton	121	(10)
1956-1958	Rochdale	102	(3)
1958-1960	Southport	40	(0)
Total		263	(13)
- * Club domestic league appearances and goals

John Albert Grant (8 September 1924 – 1999) was an English professional footballer who played for Everton, Rochdale and Southport.

Between 1946 and 1954 he made a total of 133 appearances for the Everton.
