= Joe Devlin (footballer) =

Scottish footballer (1927–2020)

Personal information
- Full name: Joseph Devlin
- Date of birth: 12 March 1931
- Place of birth: Cleland, Scotland
- Date of death: 11 December 2020 (aged 89)
- Place of death: Blackburn, England
- Position: Right winger

Senior career*
Years	Team	Apps	(Gls)
1947–1950	Albion Rovers	16	(1)
1950–1953	Falkirk	22	(2)
1953–1956	Accrington Stanley	114	(18)
1956–1957	Rochdale	38	(7)
1959–1960	Carlisle United	5	(0)
	Nelson	?	(?)
	Northwich Victoria	?	(?)
1961–1962	Accrington Stanley	?	(?)
1962	Northwich Victoria	?	(?)
Total		229	(31)
- * Club domestic league appearances and goals

Joseph Devlin (25 July 1927 – 11 December 2020) was a Scottish professional footballer, who played as a right winger in the Football League.
