= 1945–46 Liverpool F.C. season =

English football club season

Liverpool F.C.
1945–46 season
- Manager: George Kay
- Stadium: Anfield
- North Regional League: 11th
- F.A. Cup: 4th Round
- Top goalscorer: League: Willie Fagan; All: Willie Fagan
Home colours	Away colours

The 1945–46 season saw Liverpool compete in the wartime North Regional League and the F.A. Cup.

== Statistics ==
=== Appearances and goals ===
No.	Pos	Nat	Player	Total		Regional League North		F.A. Cup	
No.	Pos	Nat	Player	Apps	Goals	Apps	Goals	Apps	Goals
	GK	(England) ENG	Charlie Ashcroft	5	0	5	0	0	0
	FW	(England) ENG	Jack Balmer	36	17	34	16	2	1
	FW	(England) ENG	Kevin Baron	12	1	9	1	3	0
	DF	(England) ENG	Dick Burke	1	1	1	1	0	0
	DF	(England) ENG	Tom Bush	7	0	6	0	1	0
	DF	(England) ENG	Jackie Campbell	1	0	1	0	0	0
	FW	(England) ENG	Len Carney	1	0	1	0	0	0
	FW	(England) ENG	Cyril Done	9	5	9	5	0	0
	DF	(Scotland) SCO	John Easdale	7	0	7	0	0	0
	FW	(England) ENG	Harry Eastham	3	0	3	0	0	0
	FW	(Scotland) SCO	Willie Fagan	39	20	35	17	4	3
	DF	(England) ENG	Fred Finney	4	0	2	0	2	0
	DF	(Wales) WAL	Jeff Gulliver	15	0	15	0	0	0
	GK		Harold Hall	7	0	7	0	0	0
	DF	(Scotland) SCO	Jim Harley	27	0	24	0	3	0
	GK	(England) ENG	Alf Hobson	7	0	6	0	1	0
	DF	(England) ENG	Laurie Hughes	35	0	32	0	3	0
	MF	(England) ENG	Mick Hulligan	2	0	2	0	0	0
	MF	(England) ENG	Bill Jones	4	2	4	2	0	0
	DF	(England) ENG	Harry Kaye	28	3	27	3	1	0
	GK	(South Africa) RSA	Dirk Kemp	2	0	2	0	0	0
	MF	(England) ENG	Peter Kippax	1	1	1	1	0	0
	FW	(Wales) WAL	Ray Lambert	21	0	17	0	4	0
	MF	(Scotland) SCO	Billy Liddell	30	18	28	17	2	1
	DF	(Scotland) SCO	Jimmy McInnes	7	0	7	0	0	0
	GK	(England) ENG	Fred Nickson	13	0	10	0	3	0
	MF	(South Africa) RSA	Berry Nieuwenhuys	33	6	29	5	4	1
	DF	(England) ENG	Bob Paisley	28	2	24	2	4	0
	DF	(Scotland) SCO	George Paterson	3	0	3	0	0	0
	MF	(England) ENG	Jack Pilling	4	0	4	0	0	0
	MF	(South Africa) RSA	Bob Priday	16	4	12	4	4	0
	DF	(England) ENG	Barney Ramsden	19	0	18	0	1	0
	GK	(England) ENG	Jim Sanders	3	0	3	0	0	0
	DF	(England) ENG	Ken Seddon	1	0	1	0	0	0
	FW	(England) ENG	Les Shannon	11	2	11	2	0	0
	GK	(Wales) WAL	Cyril Sidlow	9	0	9	0	0	0
	DF	(England) ENG	Eddie Spicer	10	0	9	0	1	0
	FW	(England) ENG	Phil Taylor	32	3	31	3	1	0
	FW	(England) ENG	Don Welsh	2	0	2	0	0	0
	DF	(England) ENG	Jack Westby	11	0	11	0	0	0

== Competitions ==
=== North Region War League ===
25 August 1945 1	Burnley	1–3	Liverpool	Burnley
	Goal	Report	Liddell; Nieuwenhuys	Stadium: Turf Moor; Attendance: 7,481

29 August 1945 2	Liverpool	2–2	Bolton Wanderers	Liverpool
	Taylor 26 ' Kippax	Report	Howe 30'; Lofthouse 78'	Stadium: Anfield; Attendance: 17,437; Referee: W.B. Nixon

1 September 1945 3	Liverpool	2–3	Burnley	Liverpool
	Balmer 13 ' Liddell 55 '	Report	Hold; Kippax	Stadium: Anfield; Attendance: 26,107; Referee: H. Hartley

8 September 1945 4	Liverpool	1–1	Bury	Liverpool
	Balmer 37' (pen.)	Report	Griffiths	Stadium: Anfield; Attendance: 22,490; Referee: J. Ward

12 September 1945 5	Liverpool	2–1	Everton	Liverpool
	Liddell 41 ' Shannon 85 '	Report	Wyles	Stadium: Anfield; Attendance: 25,446; Referee: E.W. Baker

15 September 1945 6	Bury	2–1	Liverpool	Bury
	Goal	Report	Nieuwenhuys 89 '	Stadium: Gigg Lane; Attendance: 7,218

22 September 1945 7	Blackburn Rovers	0–5	Liverpool	Blackburn
		Report	Jones 20 ' Balmer 25', 41 ' Fagan 30', 49 '	Stadium: Ewood Park; Attendance: 5,131

29 September 1945 8	Liverpool	4–0	Blackburn Rovers	Liverpool
	Paisley 25 ' Fagan; Balmer; Kaye	Report		Stadium: Anfield; Attendance: 24,532; Referee: T.H. Parker

6 October 1945 9	Liverpool	4–1	Bradford Park Avenue	Liverpool
	Kaye 8', 75 ' Balmer 13 ' Liddell 83 '	Report	Horsman	Stadium: Anfield; Attendance: 32,654; Referee: J. Briggs

13 October 1945 10	Bradford Park Avenue	0–2	Liverpool	Bradford
		Report	Liddell 3 ' Shannon 55 '	Stadium: Park Avenue; Attendance: 18,308

20 October 1945 11	Manchester City	1–0	Liverpool	Manchester
	Constantine	Report		Stadium: Maine Road; Attendance: 24,084; Referee: S. McCarthy

27 October 1945 12	Liverpool	0–5	Manchester City	Liverpool
		Report	Goal	Stadium: Anfield; Attendance: 34,941

3 November 1945 13	Liverpool	3–0	Newcastle United	Liverpool
	Fagan	Report		Stadium: Anfield; Attendance: 33,818; Referee: B.J. Flanagan

10 November 1945 14	Newcastle United	6–2	Liverpool	Newcastle upon Tyne
	Goal	Report	Fagan (pen.); Nieuwenhuys	Stadium: St James' Park; Attendance: 50,833

17 November 1945 15	Sheffield Wednesday	2–3	Liverpool	Sheffield
	Rogers 5'; Froggatt 27'	Report	Balmer 52', 75'; Liddell 57 '	Stadium: Hillsborough Stadium; Attendance: 23,454; Referee: J.H. Parker

24 November 1945 16	Liverpool	0–2	Sheffield Wednesday	Liverpool
		Report	Goal	Stadium: Anfield; Attendance: 30,035; Referee: J.H. Parker

1 December 1945 17	Liverpool	4–1	Huddersfield Town	Liverpool
	Liddell 1', 22 ' Fagan 11 ' Balmer 24 '	Report	Hughes 27' (o.g.)	Stadium: Anfield; Attendance: 27,848; Referee: H.T. Wright

8 December 1945 18	Huddersfield Town	3–1	Liverpool	Huddersfield
	Goal	Report	Balmer	Stadium: Leeds Road; Attendance: 10,362

15 December 1945 19	Chesterfield	1–1	Liverpool	Chesterfield
	Goal	Report	Taylor	Stadium: Saltergate; Attendance: 11,992

22 December 1945 20	Liverpool	2–2	Chesterfield	Liverpool
	Liddell 7', 70 '	Report	Goodfellow 8'; Roberts 15'	Stadium: Anfield; Attendance: 29,274; Referee: W. Martin

25 December 1945 21	Liverpool	5–2	Barnsley	Liverpool
	Fagan; Liddell; Paisley; Priday	Report	Goal	Stadium: Anfield; Attendance: 27,501; Referee: H.W. Moore

26 December 1945 22	Barnsley	1–0	Liverpool	Barnsley
	Smith	Report		Stadium: Oakwell; Attendance: 28,464

29 December 1945 23	Everton	2–2	Liverpool	Liverpool
	Boyes 26'; Catterick 56'	Report	Baron 81 ' Liddell 85 '	Stadium: Goodison Park; Attendance: 60,926; Referee: G. Twiss

12 January 1946 24	Liverpool	4–2	Preston North End	Liverpool
	Fagan; Liddell; Priday 82 '	Report	Dougal 65'; Mutch 78'	Stadium: Anfield; Attendance: 38,310; Referee: R.K. Warburton

19 January 1946 25	Preston North End	2–1	Liverpool	Preston
	Goal	Report	Fagan 14 '	Stadium: Deepdale; Attendance: 12,371

2 February 1946 26	Leeds United	3–0	Liverpool	Leeds
	Goal	Report		Stadium: Elland Road; Attendance: 11,881

9 February 1946 27	Manchester United	2–1	Liverpool	Manchester
	Smith	Report	Balmer 65 '	Stadium: Maine Road; Attendance: 32,993; Referee: R.A. Mortimer

16 February 1946 28	Liverpool	0–5	Manchester United	Liverpool
		Report	Wigglesworth; Rowley; Hanlon	Stadium: Anfield; Attendance: 37,197; Referee: H. Berry

23 February 1946 29	Liverpool	2–2	Sunderland	Liverpool
	Liddell 2 ' Balmer 36 '	Report	Housam 39'; White 49'	Stadium: Anfield; Attendance: 37,289; Referee: H.L. Dale

2 March 1946 30	Sunderland	0–2	Liverpool	Sunderland
		Report	Fagan 15 ' Liddell 43 '	Stadium: Roker Park; Attendance: 20,505; Referee: H.L. Dale

9 March 1946 31	Sheffield United	3–1	Liverpool	Sheffield
	Goal	Report	Balmer 65' (pen.)	Stadium: Bramall Lane; Attendance: 35,000

16 March 1946 32	Liverpool	0–3	Sheffield United	Liverpool
		Report	Goal	Stadium: Anfield

23 March 1946 33	Liverpool	1–2	Middlesbrough	Liverpool
	Nieuwenhuys 8 '	Report	Fenton 70', 75'	Stadium: Anfield; Attendance: 35,000; Referee: H.W. Moore

30 March 1946 34	Middlesbrough	2–5	Liverpool	Middlesbrough
	Goal	Report	Done 4', 19', 31 ' Balmer 29 ' Fagan 90 '	Stadium: Ayresome Park; Attendance: 20,000

6 April 1946 35	Stoke City	0–1	Liverpool	Stoke-on-Trent
		Report	Done 24 '	Stadium: Victoria Ground; Attendance: 9,000

10 April 1946 36	Liverpool	1–1	Leeds United	Liverpool
	Fagan 3 '	Report	Goal	Stadium: Anfield; Attendance: 10,620; Referee: J. Lawless

13 April 1946 37	Liverpool	4–1	Stoke City	Liverpool
	Priday 26', 35 ' Fagan 44 ' Balmer 46 '	Report	Goal	Stadium: Anfield; Attendance: 28,000

19 April 1946 38	Liverpool	2–0	Grimsby Town	Liverpool
	Fagan; Nieuwenhuys	Report		Stadium: Anfield; Attendance: 38,850; Referee: T. Pikett

20 April 1946 39	Blackpool	1–1	Liverpool	Blackpool
	Goal	Report	Burke 13 '	Stadium: Bloomfield Road; Attendance: 7,000

22 April 1946 40	Grimsby Town	1–1	Liverpool	Cleethorpes
	Johnson 28'	Report	Done 53 '	Stadium: Blundell Park; Attendance: 14,000; Referee: T.G. Pikett

27 April 1946 41	Liverpool	4–0	Blackpool	Liverpool
	W.F. Thorpe 10' (o.g.); Jones 18 ' Balmer 55 ' Taylor 78 '	Report		Stadium: Anfield; Attendance: 22,000; Referee: H. Hartley

29 April 1946 42	Bolton Wanderers	1–0	Liverpool	Bolton
	Roberts 57'	Report		Stadium: Burnden Park; Attendance: 16,000

=== F.A. Cup ===
5 January 1946 3	Chester	0–2	Liverpool	Chester
		Report	Liddell 30 ' Fagan 86 '	Stadium: Sealand Road; Attendance: 12,000; Referee: F.T. Green

9 January 1946 3	Liverpool	2–1 (4–1 agg.)	Chester	Liverpool
	Fagan 3', 40 '	Report	Astbury 86'	Stadium: Anfield; Attendance: 11,207; Referee: F.T. Green

26 January 1946 4	Bolton Wanderers	5–0	Liverpool	Bolton
	Lofthouse 20', 40'; Westwood 43', 55', 60'	Report		Stadium: Burnden Park; Attendance: 39,692; Referee: H. Nattrass

30 January 1946 4	Liverpool	2–0 (2–5 agg.)	Bolton Wanderers	Liverpool
	Balmer 5 ' Nieuwenhuys 75 '	Report		Stadium: Anfield; Attendance: 35,247; Referee: H. Nattrass

=== Lancashire Senior Cup ===
19 September 1945 1	Everton	3–3	Liverpool	Liverpool
	Goal	Report	Balmer (pen.); Shannon	Stadium: Goodison Park; Attendance: 19,743

26 September 1945 1	Liverpool	1–1	Everton	Liverpool
	Balmer (pen.)	Report	Goal	Stadium: Anfield; Attendance: Unknown; Referee: G.H.H. Fell

20 February 1946 1	Liverpool	4–0	Everton	Liverpool
	Liddell; Fagan; Balmer; Taylor	Report		Stadium: Anfield; Attendance: 20,000; Referee: J. Williams

11 March 1946 2	Liverpool	3–1	Bolton Wanderers	Liverpool
	Balmer; Nieuwenhuys	Report	Goal	Stadium: Anfield; Attendance: Unknown

27 March 1946 3	Burnley	3–2	Liverpool	Burnley
	Goal	Report	Done; Fagan	Stadium: Turf Moor; Attendance: Unknown

=== Liverpool Senior Cup ===
3 April 1946 SF	Liverpool	2–0	Southport	Liverpool
	Done 12', 28'	Report		Stadium: Anfield; Attendance: Unknown; Referee: J. Phillips

1 May 1946 F	Everton	1–3	Liverpool	Liverpool
	Goal	Report	Jones 42'; Purvis 43' (o.g.); Eastham	Stadium: Goodison Park; Attendance: 23,000; Referee: J.H. Clayton

=== Friendlies ===
28 July 1945	RAF XI	0–7	Liverpool	Celle
		Report	Liddell; Balmer; Fagan (pen.) (pen.)	Stadium: Celle; Attendance: 8,000

29 July 1945	BIA 21st Army	3–3	Liverpool	Hannover
	Goal	Report	Welsh (pen.)	Stadium: Hannover; Attendance: 35,000
