= 1941–42 Liverpool F.C. season =

English football club season

Liverpool F.C.
1941–42 season
- Manager: George Kay
- Stadium: Anfield
- North Regional League: 8th & 4th
- League War Cup: 2nd Round
- Top goalscorer: League: Cyril Done; All: Cyril Done
Home colours	Away colours

The 1941–42 season saw Liverpool compete in the wartime North Regional League. Some matches were also part of the League War Cup and the Lancashire Senior Cup.

== Statistics ==
=== Appearances and goals ===
No.	Pos	Nat	Player	Total		Regional League North	
No.	Pos	Nat	Player	Apps	Goals	Apps	Goals
	FW	(England) ENG	George Ainsley	11	5	11	5
	DF	(England) ENG	Jack Balmer	12	7	12	7
	DF	(England) ENG	Bob Batey	1	0	1	0
	GK		J.T. Breeze	1	0	1	0
	DF	(Scotland) SCO	Matt Busby	1	0	1	0
	DF	(England) ENG	Tom Bush	9	1	9	1
	FW	(England) ENG	Len Carney	12	6	12	6
	DF	(England) ENG	Dennis Cook	11	2	11	2
	MF	(Northern Ireland) NIR	Peter Doherty	1	0	1	0
	FW	(England) ENG	Cyril Done	29	39	29	39
	FW	(England) ENG	Dicky Dorsett	15	13	15	13
	FW	(England) ENG	Harry Eastham	1	0	1	0
	MF	(England) ENG	Stan Eastham	7	0	7	0
	FW	(Scotland) SCO	Willie Fagan	3	2	3	2
	DF		Charles Fazackerley	10	0	10	0
	DF	(England) ENG	Fred Finney	7	0	7	0
	DF	(England) ENG	Jack Grainger	1	0	1	0
	DF	(England) ENG	Ron Guttridge	25	0	25	0
	MF	(England) ENG	Billy Hall	2	1	2	1
	DF	(Scotland) SCO	Jim Harley	4	0	4	0
	FW	(England) ENG	Freddie Haycock	15	1	15	1
	GK	(England) ENG	Alf Hobson	38	0	38	0
	MF	(England) ENG	Mick Hulligan	2	0	2	0
	MF	(England) ENG	Bill Jones	5	1	5	1
	DF	(England) ENG	Harry Kaye	38	0	38	0
	DF	(Wales) WAL	Ray Lambert	36	0	36	0
	MF	(Scotland) SCO	Billy Liddell	35	22	35	22
			John McDonald	1	0	1	0
	DF	(Scotland) SCO	Jimmy McInnes	4	0	4	0
	FW	(Scotland) SCO	Jimmy McIntosh	5	3	5	3
			Andrew McLaren	2	1	2	1
	FW	(Scotland) SCO	George Mutch	1	1	1	1
	MF	(South Africa) RSA	Berry Nieuwenhuys	17	6	17	6
			H. O'Donnell	2	0	2	0
	DF	(England) ENG	Arthur Owen	3	0	3	0
			Patrick Owens	1	0	1	0
	FW	(England) ENG	Stan Palk	20	8	20	8
	DF	(Scotland) SCO	George Paterson	2	0	2	0
	DF	(Scotland) SCO	Bob Pryde	1	0	1	0
	DF	(England) ENG	Barney Ramsden	2	0	2	0
			Denis Ridge	1	0	1	0
			Ken Seddon	1	0	1	0
	FW	(England) ENG	John Shafto	3	1	3	1
	DF	(Scotland) SCO	Bill Shankly	1	0	1	0
	DF	(England) ENG	Eddie Spicer	10	0	10	0
	FW	(England) ENG	Phil Taylor	8	2	8	2
	MF	(England) ENG	Jackie Wharton	1	1	1	1
	DF	(England) ENG	Bill Whittaker	9	0	9	0
	DF	(England) ENG	Arthur Woodruff	1	0	1	0
	DF	(Wales) WAL	Albert Young	1	0	1	0

== Competitions ==
=== North Region War League, League War Cup and Lancashire Senior Cup ===
30 August 1941 1	Liverpool	5–2	Wrexham	Liverpool
	Palk 1'; Done 2'; Dorsett; Hall	Report	Goal	Stadium: Anfield; Attendance: 5,000

6 September 1941 2	Wrexham	5–3	Liverpool	Wrexham
	Goal	Report	Done; Liddell; Palk	Stadium: Racecourse Ground; Attendance: 2,500

13 September 1941 3	Manchester City	3–4	Liverpool	Manchester
	Goal	Report	Done; Dorsett; Liddell	Stadium: Maine Road; Attendance: 3,000

20 September 1941 4	Liverpool	4–2	Manchester City	Liverpool
	Done; Dorsett	Report	Goal	Stadium: Anfield; Attendance: 5,000

27 September 1941 5	Liverpool	7–2	New Brighton	Liverpool
	Fagan; Liddell; Done	Report	Goal	Stadium: Anfield; Attendance: 5,000

4 October 1941 6	New Brighton	5–5	Liverpool	New Brighton
	Goal	Report	Dorsett 46', 47'; Done	Stadium: Sandheys Park; Attendance: 3,000

11 October 1941 7	Stockport County	1–2	Liverpool	Stockport
	Goal	Report	Done; Palk	Stadium: Edgeley Park; Attendance: 3,000

18 October 1941 8	Liverpool	6–1	Stockport County	Liverpool
	Done; Dorsett; Liddell; Ainsley	Report	Goal	Stadium: Anfield; Attendance: 3,000

25 October 1941 9	Liverpool	3–2	Everton	Liverpool
	Bush 87'; Liddell	Report	Goal	Stadium: Anfield; Attendance: 12,989

1 November 1941 10	Everton	5–3	Liverpool	Liverpool
	Goal	Report	Liddell; Done	Stadium: Goodison Park; Attendance: 20,000

8 November 1941 11	Chester	3–4	Liverpool	Chester
	Goal	Report	Cook; Palk; Shafto	Stadium: Sealand Road; Attendance: 3,000

15 November 1941 12	Liverpool	4–2	Chester	Liverpool
	Liddell 3'; Nieuwenhuys; Palk; Ainsley	Report	Goal	Stadium: Anfield; Attendance: 4,000

22 November 1941 13	Liverpool	1–1	Manchester United	Liverpool
	Taylor	Report	Smith	Stadium: Anfield; Attendance: 10,000; Referee: E. Plinston

29 November 1941 14	Manchester United	2–2	Liverpool	Manchester
	Rowley	Report	Dorsett; Liddell	Stadium: Maine Road; Attendance: 3,000

6 December 1941 15	Tranmere Rovers	1–2	Liverpool	Birkenhead
	Goal	Report	Ainsley; Dorsett	Stadium: Prenton Park; Attendance: 1,000

13 December 1941 16	Liverpool	7–2	Tranmere Rovers	Liverpool
	McIntosh; Carney; Dorsett; McIntosh	Report	Goal	Stadium: Anfield; Attendance: 3,000

20 December 1941 17	Liverpool	1–1	Stoke City	Liverpool
	Liddell	Report	Bowyer	Stadium: Anfield; Attendance: 5,500; Referee: R.A. Mortimer

25 December 1941 18	Stoke City	4–3	Liverpool	Stoke-on-Trent
	Sale; Basnett; R. Liddle	Report	W.B. Liddell; Nieuwenhuys; Palk	Stadium: Victoria Ground; Attendance: 8,000

27 December 1941 19	Liverpool	4–0	Bury	Liverpool
	Ainsley; Liddell; Nieuwenhuys	Report		Stadium: Anfield; Attendance: 6,000
Note: Also counted as a Qualifying Round for the League War Cup Competition.

3 January 1942 20	Bury	2–3	Liverpool	Bury
	Goal	Report	Carney 5'; Liddell 10'; Nieuwenhuys 15'	Stadium: Gigg Lane; Attendance: 1,338
Note: Also counted as a Qualifying Round for the League War Cup Competition.

10 January 1942 21	Preston North End	1–2	Liverpool	Preston
	Goal	Report	Carney 56'; Palk 70'	Stadium: Deepdale; Attendance: 5,000
Note: Also counted as a Qualifying Round for the League War Cup Competition.

17 January 1942 22	Liverpool	2–1	Preston North End	Liverpool
	Done 5', 50'	Report	Goal	Stadium: Anfield; Attendance: 10,000; Referee: R.A. Mortimer
Note: Also counted as a Qualifying Round for the League War Cup Competition.

7 February 1942 23	Blackpool	6–2	Liverpool	Blackpool
	Goal	Report	Done	Stadium: Bloomfield Road; Attendance: 10,000
Note: Also counted as a Qualifying Round for the League War Cup Competition.

14 February 1942 24	Liverpool	1–3	Blackpool	Liverpool
	Done 1'	Report	Goal	Stadium: Anfield; Attendance: 14,295
Note: Also counted as a Qualifying Round for the League War Cup Competition.

21 February 1942 25	Liverpool	5–2	Sheffield United	Liverpool
	Done; Jones; Liddell	Report	Hampson; Rickett	Stadium: Anfield; Attendance: 4,600
Note: Also counted as a Qualifying Round for the League War Cup Competition.

28 February 1942 26	Sheffield United	5–1	Liverpool	Sheffield
	Kaye; Pickering; Thomson	Report	Done	Stadium: Bramall Lane; Attendance: 8,000
Note: Also counted as a Qualifying Round for the League War Cup Competition.

14 March 1942 27	Rochdale	2–8	Liverpool	Rochdale
	Treanor 9'; Ancell 19'	Report	Balmer 2', 44', 63'; Done 10', 88' (pen.), 89' (pen.); Nieuwenhuys 19', 65'	Stadium: Spotland Stadium; Attendance: 3,000; Referee: J. Houston
Note: Also counted as a Qualifying Round for the League War Cup Competition.

21 March 1942 28	Chester	1–3	Liverpool	Chester
	Goal	Report	Carney 33'; Haycock 85'; Liddell 88'	Stadium: Sealand Road; Attendance: 3,000
Note: Also counted as Round One 1st Leg for the Lancashire Senior Cup.

28 March 1942 29	Liverpool	5–2	Rochdale	Liverpool
	Dorsett 15'; Liddell; Palk	Report	Bartholomew 17', 26'	Stadium: Anfield; Attendance: 5,000
Note: Also counted as a Qualifying Round for the League War Cup Competition.

4 April 1942 30	Burnley	0–3	Liverpool	Burnley
		Report	Balmer 42', 75'; Liddell 56' (pen.)	Stadium: Turf Moor; Attendance: 7,000
Note: Also counted as Round One - 1st Leg for the League War Cup Competition.

6 April 1942 31	Liverpool	4–1	Burnley	Liverpool
	Done; Taylor	Report	Goal	Stadium: Anfield; Attendance: 11,253
Note: Also counted as Round One - 2nd Leg for the League War Cup Competition.

11 April 1942 32	Liverpool	0–2	Everton	Liverpool
		Report	Goal	Stadium: Anfield; Attendance: 33,445; Referee: F.W. Wort
Note: Also counted as Round Two - 1st Leg for the League War Cup Competition.

18 April 1942 33	Everton	0–1	Liverpool	Liverpool
		Report	Balmer 34'	Stadium: Goodison Park; Attendance: 33,780; Referee: F.W. Wort
Note: Also counted as Round Two - 2nd Leg for the League War Cup Competition.

25 April 1942 34	Liverpool	0–0	Blackburn Rovers	Liverpool
		Report		Stadium: Anfield; Attendance: 4,000; Referee: W. Prescott

9 May 1942 35	Liverpool	3–0	Chester	Liverpool
	Done	Report		Stadium: Anfield; Attendance: 5,000; Referee: J.N. Brown
Note: Also counted as Round One 2nd Leg for the Lancashire Senior Cup

16 May 1942 36	Preston North End	0–2	Liverpool	Preston
		Report	Balmer 35'; Liddell 52'	Stadium: Deepdale; Attendance: 3,000

23 May 1942 37	Liverpool	2–2	Blackburn Rovers	Liverpool
	McLaren 30'; Mutch	Report	Goal	Stadium: Anfield; Attendance: 8,062
Note: Also counted as the Semi-Final for the Lancashire Cup Competition with the ninety minute score at 2-2 for the League and the match score at 3-2 in favour of Blackburn Rovers for the Cup. Liverpool were awarded a bye from Round Two.

25 May 1942 38	Blackpool	8–2	Liverpool	Blackpool
	Goal	Report	Done; Liddell (pen.)	Stadium: Bloomfield Road; Attendance: 4,000

30 May 1942 39	Liverpool	4–1	Everton	Liverpool
	Done; Wharton; Carney	Report	Goal	Stadium: Anfield; Attendance: 13,761; Referee: J. Bennett
