= 1946–47 Liverpool F.C. season =

English football club season

Liverpool
1946–47 season
- Manager: George Kay
- Stadium: Anfield
- First Division: Champions
- FA Cup: Semi-finals
- Top goalscorer: League: Jack Balmer (24); Albert Stubbins (24); All: Jack Balmer (24); Albert Stubbins (24)
- Highest home attendance: 52,512 (v Wolverhampton Wanderers, League, 7 December)
- Lowest home attendance: 20,648 (v Grimsby Town, League, 12 February)
- Average home league attendance: 45,732
| Home colours | Away colours |

The 1946–47 season was the 55th season in Liverpool F.C.'s existence, and ended with the club winning the title by one point over Manchester United and Wolverhampton Wanderers. The chances of them doing the double was over after being beaten in the FA Cup Semi-Finals by Second Division side Burnley.

== Goalkeepers ==
- (England) Charlie Ashcroft
- (England) Ray Minshull
- (Wales) Cyril Sidlow

== Defenders ==
- (England) Tom Bush
- (Scotland) John Easdale
- (Scotland) Jim Harley
- (England) Laurie Hughes
- (England) Bill Jones
- (England) George Kaye
- (Wales) Ray Lambert
- (England) Bob Paisley
- (England) Stan Palk
- (England) Bernard Ramsden
- (England) Eddie Spicer
- (England) Phil Taylor

== Midfielders ==
- (England) Harry Eastham
- (Scotland) Billy Liddell
- (Scotland) Doug McAvoy
- (Scotland) Tommy McLeod
- (Scotland) Alex Muir
- (South Africa) Berry Nieuwenhuys
- (England) Jimmy Payne
- (South Africa) Robert Priday
- (England) Billy Watkinson

== Forwards ==
- (England) Jack Balmer
- (England) Kevin Baron
- (England) Len Carney
- (England) Cyril Done
- (Scotland) Willie Fagan
- (England) Albert Stubbins

== Statistics ==
=== Appearances and goals ===
| No. | Pos | Nat | Player | Total | | Division 1 | | FA Cup | |
| No. | Pos | Nat | Player | Apps | Goals | Apps | Goals | Apps | Goals |
|---|---|---|---|---|---|---|---|---|---|
| | GK | (England) ENG | Charlie Ashcroft | 2 | 0 | 2 | 0 | 0 | 0 |
| | FW | (England) ENG | Jack Balmer | 45 | 28 | 39 | 24 | 6 | 4 |
| | DF | (England) ENG | Tom Bush | 3 | 0 | 3 | 0 | 0 | 0 |
| | FW | (England) ENG | Len Carney | 2 | 1 | 2 | 1 | 0 | 0 |
| | FW | (England) ENG | Cyril Done | 23 | 12 | 17 | 10 | 6 | 2 |
| | DF | (Scotland) SCO | John Easdale | 2 | 0 | 2 | 0 | 0 | 0 |
| | MF | (England) ENG | Harry Eastham | 21 | 0 | 19 | 0 | 2 | 0 |
| | FW | (Scotland) SCO | Willie Fagan | 22 | 7 | 18 | 7 | 4 | 0 |
| | DF | (Scotland) SCO | Jim Harley | 21 | 0 | 17 | 0 | 4 | 0 |
| | DF | (England) ENG | Laurie Hughes | 31 | 0 | 30 | 0 | 1 | 0 |
| | DF | (England) ENG | Bill Jones | 32 | 2 | 26 | 2 | 6 | 0 |
| | DF | (England) ENG | Harry Kaye | 1 | 0 | 1 | 0 | 0 | 0 |
| | DF | (Wales) WAL | Ray Lambert | 42 | 0 | 36 | 0 | 6 | 0 |
| | MF | (Scotland) SCO | Billy Liddell | 40 | 8 | 34 | 7 | 6 | 1 |
| | MF | (Scotland) SCO | Tommy McLeod | 3 | 0 | 3 | 0 | 0 | 0 |
| | GK | (England) ENG | Ray Minshull | 6 | 0 | 6 | 0 | 0 | 0 |
| | MF | (South Africa) RSA | Berry Nieuwenhuys | 15 | 5 | 15 | 5 | 0 | 0 |
| | DF | (England) ENG | Bob Paisley | 39 | 0 | 33 | 0 | 6 | 0 |
| | DF | (England) ENG | Stan Palk | 6 | 0 | 6 | 0 | 0 | 0 |
| | MF | (South Africa) RSA | Bob Priday | 9 | 2 | 9 | 2 | 0 | 0 |
| | DF | (England) ENG | Barney Ramsden | 24 | 0 | 23 | 0 | 1 | 0 |
| | GK | (Wales) WAL | Cyril Sidlow | 40 | 0 | 34 | 0 | 6 | 0 |
| | DF | (England) ENG | Eddie Spicer | 10 | 0 | 10 | 0 | 0 | 0 |
| | FW | (England) ENG | Albert Stubbins | 42 | 28 | 36 | 24 | 6 | 4 |
| | DF | (England) ENG | Phil Taylor | 41 | 1 | 35 | 1 | 6 | 0 |
| | MF | (England) ENG | Billy Watkinson | 6 | 1 | 6 | 1 | 0 | 0 |

== Table ==
| Pos | Team | Pld | W | D | L | GF | GA | GAv | Pts |
|---|---|---|---|---|---|---|---|---|---|
| 1 | Liverpool (C) | 42 | 25 | 7 | 10 | 84 | 52 | 1.615 | 57 |
| 2 | Manchester United | 42 | 22 | 12 | 8 | 95 | 54 | 1.759 | 56 |
| 3 | Wolverhampton Wanderers | 42 | 25 | 6 | 11 | 98 | 56 | 1.750 | 56 |
| 4 | Stoke City | 42 | 24 | 7 | 11 | 90 | 53 | 1.698 | 55 |
| 5 | Blackpool | 42 | 22 | 6 | 14 | 71 | 70 | 1.014 | 50 |

Source: World Football
Rules for classification: 1) Points; 2) Goal average; 3) Goals scored
(C) Champions

== Results ==
=== First Division ===
| Date | Opponents | Venue | Result | Scorers | Attendance | Report 1 | Report 2 |
|---|---|---|---|---|---|---|---|
| 31-Aug-46 | Sheffield United | A | 1–0 | Carney 90' | 28,296 | Report | Report |
| 04-Sep-46 | Middlesbrough | H | 0–1 | | 34,140 | Report | Report |
| 07-Sep-46 | Chelsea | H | 7–4 | Liddell 2', 50' Jones 24', 30' Fagan 44', 87' Balmer 47' | 49,995 | Report | Report |
| 11-Sep-46 | Manchester United | A | 0–5 | | 40,874 | Report | Report |
| 14-Sep-46 | Bolton Wanderers | A | 3–1 | Nieuwenhuys 40' Stubbins 82' Balmer 90' | 35,061 | Report | Report |
| 21-Sep-46 | Everton | H | 0–0 | | 49,875 | Report | Report |
| 28-Sep-46 | Leeds United | H | 2–0 | Balmer 15' Nieuwenhuys 73' | 51,042 | Report | Report |
| 05-Oct-46 | Grimsby Town | A | 6–1 | Stubbins 22', 53' Liddell 24', 70' Balmer 57' Fagan pen 65' | 20,189 | Report | Report |
| 09-Oct-46 | Middlesbrough | A | 2–2 | Liddell 24', 36' | 37,382 | Report | Report |
| 12-Oct-46 | Charlton Athletic | H | 1–1 | Done 9' | 51,127 | Report | Report |
| 19-Oct-46 | Huddersfield Town | A | 4–1 | Done 29', 43', 76' Balmer 90' | 17,323 | Report | Report |
| 26-Oct-46 | Brentford | H | 1–0 | Stubbins 49' | 43,892 | Report | Report |
| 02-Nov-46 | Blackburn Rovers | A | 0–0 | | 29,072 | Report | Report |
| 09-Nov-46 | Portsmouth | H | 3–0 | Balmer pen 30', 70', 79' | 43,525 | Report | Report |
| 16-Nov-46 | Derby County | A | 4–1 | Balmer 43', 46', 49', 60' | 28,444 | Report | Report |
| 23-Nov-46 | Arsenal | H | 4–2 | Balmer pen 15', 61', 68' Stubbins 78' | 51,435 | Report | Report |
| 30-Nov-46 | Blackpool | A | 2–3 | Balmer 39' Done 88' | 23,565 | Report | Report |
| 07-Dec-46 | Wolverhampton Wanderers | H | 1–5 | Balmer pen 77' | 52,512 | Report | Report |
| 14-Dec-46 | Sunderland | A | 4–1 | Balmer 20' Liddell 40' Nieuwenhuys 65' Stubbins 77' | 33,291 | Report | Report |
| 21-Dec-46 | Aston Villa | H | 4–1 | Stubbins 18' Nieuwenhuys 40' Balmer 72', 78' | 35,389 | Report | Report |
| 25-Dec-46 | Stoke City | A | 1–2 | Stubbins 82' | 30,473 | Report | Report |
| 26-Dec-46 | Stoke City | H | 2–0 | Nieuwenhuys 68' Stubbins 85' | 49,465 | Report | Report |
| 28-Dec-46 | Sheffield United | H | 1–2 | Stubbins 43' | 50,961 | Report | Report |
| 04-Jan-47 | Chelsea | A | 1–3 | Balmer 36' | 59,226 | Report | Report |
| 18-Jan-47 | Bolton Wanderers | H | 0–3 | | 49,820 | Report | Report |
| 29-Jan-47 | Everton | A | 0–1 | | 30,612 | Report | Report |
| 01-Feb-47 | Leeds United | A | 2–1 | Stubbins 15', 88' | 25,430 | Report | Report |
| 12-Feb-47 | Grimsby Town | H | 5–0 | Done 24', 40', 85' Fagan 30', 32' | 20,648 | Report | Report |
| 22-Feb-47 | Huddersfield Town | H | 1–0 | Stubbins 37' | 42,130 | Report | Report |
| 08-Mar-47 | Blackburn Rovers | H | 2–1 | Stubbins 37' Done 77' | 49,378 | Report | Report |
| 15-Mar-47 | Portsmouth | A | 2–1 | Stubbins 51', 57' | 30,296 | Report | Report |
| 22-Mar-47 | Derby County | H | 1–1 | Taylor 79' | 50,848 | Report | Report |
| 04-Apr-47 | Preston North End | A | 0–0 | | 32,542 | Report | Report |
| 05-Apr-47 | Blackpool | H | 2–3 | Fagan 15' Done 52' | 47,320 | Report | Report |
| 07-Apr-47 | Preston North End | H | 3–0 | Stubbins 24', 70' Balmer 44' | 46,477 | Report | Report |
| 19-Apr-47 | Sunderland | H | 1–0 | Stubbins 27' | 41,589 | Report | Report |
| 26-Apr-47 | Aston Villa | A | 2–1 | Watkinson 9' Fagan 30' | 35,429 | Report | Report |
| 03-May-47 | Manchester United | H | 1–0 | Stubbins 12' | 48,800 | Report | Report |
| 10-May-47 | Charlton Athletic | A | 3–1 | Stubbins 24', ?', ?' | 45,608 | Report | Report |
| 17-May-47 | Brentford | A | 1–1 | Priday 72' | 18,228 | Report | Report |
| 24-May-47 | Arsenal | A | 2–1 | Balmer 76' Priday 79' | 44,265 | Report | Report |
| 31-May-47 | Wolverhampton Wanderers | A | 2–1 | Balmer 21' Stubbins 38' | 50,765 | Report | Report |
