= 1939–40 Liverpool F.C. season =

English football club season

Liverpool F.C.
1939–40 season
- Manager: George Kay
- Stadium: Anfield
- West Regional League: 2nd
- League War Cup: 1st Round
- Top goalscorer: League: Berry Nieuwenhuys; All: Berry Nieuwenhuys
Home colours	Away colours

The 1939–40 season was the 48th season in Liverpool F.C.'s existence, however only 3 matches were played before the season was abandoned due to the outbreak of World War 2. A replacement wartime league was subsequently formed.

== Statistics ==
=== Appearances and goals ===
No.	Pos	Nat	Player	Total		Division 1		Regional League West		War League Cup	
No.	Pos	Nat	Player	Apps	Goals	Apps	Goals	Apps	Goals	Apps	Goals
	DF	(England) ENG	Jack Balmer	11	6	3	1	7	5	1	0
	DF	(England) ENG	Alan Brown	4	0	0	0	4	0	0	0
	FW	(Scotland) SCO	Matt Busby	19	1	3	0	14	1	2	0
	DF	(England) ENG	Tom Bush	11	0	3	0	7	0	1	0
	FW	(England) ENG	Len Carney	15	5	0	0	13	5	2	0
	DF	(England) ENG	Doug Cole	1	0	0	0	1	0	0	0
	DF	(England) ENG	Dennis Cook	1	0	0	0	1	0	0	0
	DF	(England) ENG	Tom Cooper	9	0	0	0	9	0	0	0
	FW	(Northern Ireland) NIR	Peter Doherty	1	2	0	0	1	2	0	0
	FW	(England) ENG	Cyril Done	5	5	1	1	4	4	0	0
	DF	(Scotland) SCO	John Easdale	3	0	0	0	3	0	0	0
	FW	(England) ENG	Harry Eastham	1	1	0	0	1	1	0	0
	MF	(England) ENG	Stan Eastham	10	0	0	0	9	0	1	0
	FW	(Scotland) SCO	Willie Fagan	16	15	3	0	12	14	1	1
	DF	(England) ENG	Ron Guttridge	3	0	0	0	3	0	0	0
	DF	(England) ENG	Wally Halsall	2	0	0	0	2	0	0	0
	MF	(England) ENG	Alf Hanson	2	1	0	0	2	1	0	0
	DF	(Scotland) SCO	Jim Harley	9	0	3	0	5	0	1	0
	GK	(South Africa) RSA	Dirk Kemp	7	0	3	0	4	0	0	0
	MF	(Scotland) SCO	Bill Kinghorn	1	0	0	0	1	0	0	0
	DF	(Wales) WAL	Ray Lambert	7	0	0	0	5	0	2	0
	MF	(England) ENG	George Leadbetter	4	1	0	0	4	1	0	0
	MF	(Scotland) SCO	Billy Liddell	16	9	0	0	14	9	2	0
	GK	(England) ENG	Eric Mansley	7	0	0	0	6	0	1	0
	DF	(Scotland) SCO	Jimmy McInnes	14	1	3	1	11	0	0	0
	FW	(Wales) WAL	George Murphy	3	1	0	0	3	1	0	0
	MF	(South Africa) RSA	Berry Nieuwenhuys	25	18	3	0	20	18	2	0
	DF	(England) ENG	Bob Paisley	7	0	0	0	5	0	2	0
	DF	(Scotland) SCO	George Paterson	1	0	0	0	1	0	0	0
	FW	(England) ENG	Stan Palk	2	0	0	0	2	0	0	0
	DF	(England) ENG	Barney Ramsden	15	0	3	0	11	0	1	0
	GK	(South Africa) RSA	Arthur Riley	11	0	0	0	10	0	1	0
	DF	(England) ENG	Fred Rogers	6	0	0	0	5	0	1	0
	DF	(England) ENG	Eddie Spicer	1	0	0	0	1	0	0	0
	DF	(England) ENG	Bobby Stuart	1	0	0	0	1	0	0	0
	GK	(England) ENG	Frank Swift	2	0	0	0	2	0	0	0
	DF	(England) ENG	Phil Taylor	13	2	2	2	11	0	0	0
	DF	(England) ENG	Jack Tennant	15	1	0	0	15	1	0	0
	MF	(South Africa) RSA	Harman van den Berg	17	4	3	1	13	3	1	0
	FW	(England) ENG	George Walton	1	0	0	0	1	0	0	0

== Friendlies ==
24 May 1939 Friendly	Swedish Combination	5–4	Liverpool	Malmö
	Goal	Report	Van Den Berg; Fagan; Balmer; Taylor	Stadium: Malmö Stadion; Attendance: 15,000

26 May 1939 Friendly	AIK Stockholm	2–0	Liverpool	Stockholm
	Goal	Report		Stadium: Råsunda Stadium; Attendance: 10,087

31 May 1939 Friendly	Göteborg Select	0–2	Liverpool	Gothenburg
		Report	Taylor 10'; Nieuwenhuys 90'	Stadium: Gothenburg; Attendance: 8,402

2 June 1939 Friendly	Södermanland XI	0–6	Liverpool	Eskilstuna
		Report	Taylor; Nieuwenhuys; Eastham	Stadium: Tunavallen; Attendance: 8,000

6 June 1939 Friendly	Elfsborg	5–2	Liverpool	Borås
	Goal	Report	Taylor 45'; Fagan 82'	Stadium: Idrottsplatsen; Attendance: 6,050; Referee: Erik Björk

19 August 1939 Friendly	Liverpool	2–1	Everton	Liverpool
	Taylor 9'; Balmer 54'	Report	Lawton	Stadium: Anfield; Attendance: 15,222
Note: Benefit for the Football League – Jubilee Fund

16 September 1939 Friendly	Chester	0–5	Liverpool	Chester
		Report	Fagan 14', 50'; Nieuwenhuys 70'; Balmer 80'; Carney 84'	Stadium: Sealand Road; Attendance: 5,659

23 September 1939 Friendly	Liverpool	3–0	Bolton Wanderers	Liverpool
	Balmer; Busby	Report		Stadium: Anfield; Attendance: Unknown

30 September 1939 Friendly	Blackburn Rovers	0–5	Liverpool	Blackburn
		Report	Fagan; Nieuwenhuys; Taylor; Balmer	Stadium: Ewood Park; Attendance: Unknown

7 October 1939 Friendly	Liverpool	1–4	Everton	Liverpool
	Taylor	Report	Goal	Stadium: Anfield; Attendance: 10,000

14 October 1939 Friendly	Crewe Alexandra	0–1	Liverpool	Crewe
		Report	Nieuwenhuys	Stadium: Gresty Road; Attendance: Unknown

16 December 1939 Friendly	Liverpool	0–1	Preston North End	Liverpool
		Report	Goal	Stadium: Anfield; Attendance: 300; Referee: Roberts SN

25 December 1939 Friendly	Liverpool	2–3	Everton	Liverpool
	Fagan	Report	Goal	Stadium: Anfield; Attendance: 7,679
Note: Grand match

26 December 1939 Friendly	Everton	2–1	Liverpool	Liverpool
	Goal	Report	Busby	Stadium: Goodison Park; Attendance: 9,000

30 December 1939 Friendly	Liverpool	3–1	Preston North End	Liverpool
	Done; Fagan	Report	Goal	Stadium: Anfield; Attendance: Unknown

25 March 1940 Friendly	Liverpool	0–1	Bolton Wanderers	Liverpool
		Report	Goal	Stadium: Anfield; Attendance: 6,000

4 May 1940 Friendly	Oldham Athletic	2–4	Liverpool	Oldham
	Goal	Report	Liddell; Carney; Nieuwenhuys; Leadbetter	Stadium: Boundary Park; Attendance: Unknown

== Competitions ==
=== Football League First division ===
26 August 1939 1	Sheffield United	2–1	Liverpool	Sheffield
	Hampson 3'; Hagan 85'	Report	McInnes 33'	Stadium: Bramall Lane; Attendance: 25,483; Referee: W.E. Ross-Gower

30 August 1939 2	Liverpool	4–1	Middlesbrough	Liverpool
	Van Den Berg; Taylor; Balmer	Report	Fenton 5'	Stadium: Anfield; Attendance: 16,762; Referee: H. Berry

2 September 1939 3	Liverpool	1–0	Chelsea	Liverpool
	Done 32'; Harley (red card)	Report		Stadium: Anfield; Attendance: 18,386; Referee: G.W. Jones

=== Regional League - West Division ===
21 October 1939 1	Stockport County	0–3	Liverpool	Stockport
		Report	Balmer 15', 88'; Fagan 89'	Stadium: Edgeley Park; Attendance: 5,000

28 October 1939 2	Liverpool	1–1	Port Vale	Liverpool
	Balmer 15'	Report	Nolan	Stadium: Anfield; Attendance: 4,000

11 November 1939 3	Tranmere Rovers	1–3	Liverpool	Birkenhead
	Goal	Report	Fagan; Nieuwenhuys	Stadium: Prenton Park; Attendance: 6,000

18 November 1939 4	Liverpool	1–0	Manchester United	Liverpool
	Fagan 16' (pen.)	Report		Stadium: Anfield; Attendance: 5,000

25 November 1939 5	Wrexham	2–1	Liverpool	Wrexham
	Goal	Report	Nieuwenhuys	Stadium: Racecourse Ground; Attendance: 2,000

2 December 1939 6	Liverpool	2–2	Everton	Liverpool
	Nieuwenhuys 50'; Fagan 51' (pen.)	Report	Goal	Stadium: Anfield; Attendance: 8,000

9 December 1939 7	Stoke City	3–1	Liverpool	Stoke-on-Trent
	Sale; Liddle; Bowyer	Report	Fagan	Stadium: Victoria Ground; Attendance: 1,300

23 December 1939 8	Liverpool	6–2	New Brighton	Liverpool
	Carney; Done; Eastham	Report	Goal	Stadium: Anfield; Attendance: 2,000

1 January 1940 9	Liverpool	7–3	Crewe Alexandra	Liverpool
	Nieuwenhuys; Busby; Carney; Leadbetter; Liddell	Report	Goal	Stadium: Anfield; Attendance: 2,000

6 January 1940 10	Manchester City	3–7	Liverpool	Manchester
	Goal	Report	Liddell; Nieuwenhuys; Fagan	Stadium: Maine Road; Attendance: 6,000

20 January 1940 11	Liverpool	1–1	Chester	Liverpool
	Nieuwenhuys	Report	Goal	Stadium: Anfield; Attendance: 1,000

24 February 1940 12	Port Vale	3–8	Liverpool	Hanley
	Sproson; Roberts; Griffiths	Report	Fagan (pen.); Liddell; Tennant; Van Den Berg	Stadium: Old Recreation Ground; Attendance: 2,000

16 March 1940 13	Manchester United	1–0	Liverpool	Manchester
	Pearson	Report		Stadium: Old Trafford; Attendance: 6,000

22 March 1940 14	Crewe Alexandra	3–6	Liverpool	Crewe
	Goal	Report	Carney; Fagan (pen.) (pen.); Liddell; Balmer	Stadium: Gresty Road; Attendance: 4,300

23 March 1940 15	Liverpool	0–0	Wrexham	Liverpool
		Report		Stadium: Anfield; Attendance: 8,000

30 March 1940 16	Everton	1–3	Liverpool	Liverpool
	Goal	Report	Nieuwenhuys 28', 29'; Liddell	Stadium: Goodison Park; Attendance: 12,896

6 April 1940 17	Liverpool	1–2	Stoke City	Liverpool
	Balmer	Report	Steele; Peppitt	Stadium: Anfield; Attendance: 5,000

11 May 1940 18	Liverpool	4–3	Stockport County	Liverpool
	Van Den Berg; Nieuwenhuys	Report	Goal	Stadium: Anfield; Attendance: 6,000

18 May 1940 19	Chester	4–0	Liverpool	Chester
	Goal	Report		Stadium: Sealand Road; Attendance: 1,500

25 May 1940 20	Liverpool	3–2	Manchester City	Liverpool
	Liddell 80' (pen.); Murphy 83'; Nieuwenhuys	Report	Goal	Stadium: Anfield; Attendance: 2,000

29 May 1940 21	Liverpool	8–3	Tranmere Rovers	Liverpool
	Nieuwenhuys; Carney; Doherty; Hanson; Liddell	Report	Goal	Stadium: Anfield; Attendance: 5,000

1 June 1940 22	New Brighton	0–0	Liverpool	Birkenhead
		Report		Stadium: Sandheys Park; Attendance: 1,500

=== Football League War Cup ===
20 April 1940 1	Barrow	2–0	Liverpool	Barrow-in-Furness
	Goal	Report		Stadium: Holker Street; Attendance: 5,963

27 April 1940 1	Liverpool	1–2 (1–4 agg.)	Barrow	Liverpool
	Fagan (pen.)	Report	Goal	Stadium: Anfield; Attendance: 9,147

=== Lancashire Senior Cup ===
4 November 1939 1	Bolton Wanderers	1–3	Liverpool	Bolton
	Goal	Report	Taylor 5', 32'; Fagan 29'	Stadium: Burnden Park; Attendance: Unknown

13 January 1940 QF	New Brighton	1–4	Liverpool	New Brighton
	Goal	Report	Done; Fagan; Liddell	Stadium: Sandheys Park; Attendance: Unknown

13 April 1940 SF	Everton	4–1	Liverpool	Liverpool
	Goal	Report	Nieuwenhuys 60'	Stadium: Goodison Park; Attendance: Unknown
