= 1948–49 Liverpool F.C. season =

English football club season

Liverpool
1948–49 season
- Manager: George Kay
- First Division: 12th
- FA Cup: Fifth round
- Top goalscorer: League: Jack Balmer (14); All: Jack Balmer (16)
- Highest home attendance: 61,003 (v Notts County, FA Cup, 29 January)
- Lowest home attendance: 23,866 (v Aston Villa, League, 18 December)
- Average home league attendance: 45,125
Home colours	Away colours

The 1948–49 season was the 57th season in Liverpool F.C.'s existence, and ended with the club finishing twelfth in the table.

== Goalkeepers ==
- (England) Charlie Ashcroft
- (England) Ray Minshull
- (Wales) Cyril Sidlow

== Defenders ==
- (Scotland) Joe Cadden
- (England) Laurie Hughes
- (England) Bill Jones
- (Wales) Ray Lambert
- (England) Bob Paisley
- (England) Bill Shepherd
- (Scotland) Sam Shields
- (England) Eddie Spicer
- (England) Phil Taylor

== Midfielders ==
- (England) Ken Brierley
- (England) Peter Kippax
- (Scotland) Billy Liddell
- (Scotland) Doug McAvoy
- (Scotland) Tommy McLeod
- (Scotland) Alex Muir
- (England) Jimmy Payne
- (England) Billy Watkinson
- (England) Bryan Williams

== Forwards ==
- (England) Jack Balmer
- (England) Kevin Baron
- (England) Cyril Done
- (Scotland) Willie Fagan
- (England) Les Shannon
- (England) Albert Stubbins

== Squad statistics ==
=== Appearances and goals ===
No.	Pos	Nat	Player	Total		Division 1		FA Cup	
No.	Pos	Nat	Player	Apps	Goals	Apps	Goals	Apps	Goals
	FW	(England) ENG	Jack Balmer	46	16	42	14	4	2
	FW	(England) ENG	Kevin Baron	6	2	6	2	0	0
	MF	(England) ENG	Ken Brierley	14	0	13	0	1	0
	FW	(England) ENG	Cyril Done	28	12	24	11	4	1
	FW	(Scotland) SCO	Willie Fagan	14	3	13	2	1	1
	DF	(England) ENG	Laurie Hughes	12	0	12	0	0	0
	DF	(England) ENG	Bill Jones	42	0	38	0	4	0
	MF	(England) ENG	Peter Kippax	1	0	1	0	0	0
	DF	(Wales) WAL	Ray Lambert	45	0	41	0	4	0
	MF	(Scotland) SCO	Billy Liddell	42	9	38	8	4	1
	FW	(Scotland) SCO	Doug McAvoy	1	0	1	0	0	0
	MF	(Scotland) SCO	Tommy McLeod	4	0	4	0	0	0
	GK	(England) ENG	Ray Minshull	5	0	4	0	1	0
	DF	(England) ENG	Bob Paisley	40	2	36	1	4	1
	MF	(England) ENG	Jimmy Payne	38	4	35	3	3	1
	MF	(South Africa) RSA	Bob Priday	4	0	4	0	0	0
	FW	(England) ENG	Les Shannon	10	1	10	1	0	0
	DF	(England) ENG	Bill Shepherd	45	0	41	0	4	0
	GK	(Wales) WAL	Cyril Sidlow	41	0	38	0	3	0
	DF	(England) ENG	Eddie Spicer	4	0	4	0	0	0
	FW	(England) ENG	Albert Stubbins	18	7	15	6	3	1
	DF	(England) ENG	Phil Taylor	34	1	30	1	4	0
	MF	(England) ENG	Billy Watkinson	6	1	6	1	0	0
	MF	(England) ENG	Bryan Williams	6	0	6	0	0	0

== Table ==
Pos	Team	Pld	W	D	L	GF	GA	GAv	Pts
10	Aston Villa	42	16	10	16	60	76	0.789	42
11	Stoke City	42	16	9	17	66	68	0.971	41
12	Liverpool	42	13	14	15	53	43	1.233	40
13	Chelsea	42	12	14	16	69	68	1.015	38
14	Bolton Wanderers	42	14	10	18	59	68	0.868	38

Source: World Football
Rules for classification: 1) Points; 2) Goal average; 3) Goals scored

== Results ==
=== First Division ===
Date	Opponents	Venue	Result	Scorers	Attendance	Report 1	Report 2
21-Aug-48	Aston Villa	A	1–2	Balmer 73'	42,193	Report	Report
25-Aug-48	Sheffield United	H	3–3	Balmer Liddell	37,393	Report	Report
28-Aug-48	Sunderland	H	4–0	Liddell 44' Fagan 47' Watkinson Balmer 80'	52,253	Report	Report
30-Aug-48	Sheffield United	A	2–1	Shannon 22' Liddell 48'	27,681	Report	Report
04-Sep-48	Wolverhampton Wanderers	A	0–0		41,684	Report	Report
08-Sep-48	Arsenal	A	1–1	Liddell 50'	41,571	Report	Report
11-Sep-48	Bolton Wanderers	H	0–1		56,561	Report	Report
15-Sep-48	Arsenal	H	0–1		46,714	Report	Report
18-Sep-48	Everton	A	1–1	Fagan 80'	78,299	Report	Report
25-Sep-48	Blackpool	A	0–1		28,870	Report	Report
02-Oct-48	Derby County	H	0–0		53,776	Report	Report
09-Oct-48	Chelsea	H	1–1	Payne 87'	42,709	Report	Report
16-Oct-48	Birmingham City	A	1–0	Done 37'	42,331	Report	Report
23-Oct-48	Middlesbrough	H	4–0	Balmer 25' Stubbins 75' Liddell (pen 77) Own goal 89'	57,561	Report	Report
30-Oct-48	Newcastle United	A	0–1		67,362	Report	Report
06-Nov-48	Portsmouth	H	3–1	Liddell 9' Balmer 18' Done 77'	43,665	Report	Report
13-Nov-48	Manchester City	A	4–2	Payne 10' Done 12', 20' Taylor 30'	22,775	Report	Report
20-Nov-48	Charlton Athletic	H	1–1	Done 21'	49,377	Report	Report
27-Nov-48	Stoke City	A	0–3		29,780	Report	Report
04-Dec-48	Burnley	H	1–1	Done 79'	41,001	Report	Report
11-Dec-48	Preston North End	A	2–3	Done 24', 54'	29,257	Report	Report
18-Dec-48	Aston Villa	H	1–1	Done 10'	23,866	Report	Report
25-Dec-48	Manchester United	A	0–0		50,649	Report	Report
27-Dec-48	Manchester United	H	0–2		53,273	Report	Report
01-Jan-49	Sunderland	A	2–0	Own goal 11' Liddell (pen 86)	43,109	Report	Report
22-Jan-49	Bolton Wanderers	A	3–0	Balmer 14' Stubbins 70' Own goal 75'	35,668	Report	Report
05-Feb-49	Everton	H	0–0		50,132	Report	Report
19-Feb-49	Blackpool	H	1–1	Balmer 25'	52,294	Report	Report
05-Mar-49	Chelsea	A	1–2	Payne 34'	42,746	Report	Report
12-Mar-49	Birmingham City	H	1–0	Done 59'	43,753	Report	Report
19-Mar-49	Charlton Athletic	A	1–2	Balmer 35'	29,101	Report	Report
26-Mar-49	Stoke City	H	4–0	Stubbins Done 67' Balmer 88'	30,797	Report	Report
02-Apr-49	Portsmouth	A	2–3	Stubbins 52' Paisley 54'	35,013	Report	Report
06-Apr-49	Wolverhampton Wanderers	H	0–0		35,399	Report	Report
09-Apr-49	Manchester City	H	0–1		31,389	Report	Report
15-Apr-49	Huddersfield Town	H	0–1		47,319	Report	Report
16-Apr-49	Middlesbrough	A	1–0	Balmer 6'	32,308	Report	Report
18-Apr-49	Huddersfield Town	A	4–0	Balmer 18', 84' Baron 24' Liddell 40'	22,158	Report	Report
23-Apr-49	Newcastle United	H	1–1	Baron 55'	43,488	Report	Report
30-Apr-49	Burnley	A	2–0	Balmer 85' Stubbins 88'	17,693	Report	Report
04-May-49	Derby County	A	0–3		22,888	Report	Report
07-May-49	Preston North End	H	0–2		31,937	Report	Report

=== FA Cup ===
Date	Opponents	Venue	Result	Scorers	Attendance	Report 1	Report 2
08-Jan-49	Nottingham Forest	A	2–2	Fagan 78' Done 90'	35,000	Report	Report
15-Jan-49	Nottingham Forest	H	4–0	Payne 28' Balmer 68', 89' Stubbins 76'	52,218	Report	Report
29-Jan-49	Notts County	H	1–0	Liddell 58'	61,003	Report	Report
12-Feb-49	Wolverhampton Wanderers	A	1–3	Done 62'	54,983	Report	Report
