= 1940–41 Liverpool F.C. season =

English football club season

Liverpool F.C.
1940–41 season
- Manager: George Kay
- Stadium: Anfield
- North Regional League: 16th
- League War Cup: 1st Round
- Top goalscorer: League: Berry Nieuwenhuys; All: Berry Nieuwenhuys
Home colours	Away colours

The 1940–41 season saw Liverpool compete in the wartime North Regional League and the League War Cup. Some matches were also part of the Lancashire Senior Cup.

== Statistics ==
=== Appearances and goals ===
No.	Pos	Nat	Player	Total		Regional League North		League War Cup	
No.	Pos	Nat	Player	Apps	Goals	Apps	Goals	Apps	Goals
	DF	(England) ENG	Jack Balmer	2	0	1	0	1	0
	GK	(England) ENG	Sam Bartram	16	0	16	0	0	0
	DF	(England) ENG	Bob Batey	12	0	12	0	0	0
	DF	(England) ENG	Cliff Britton	1	0	1	0	0	0
	DF	(England) ENG	Tom Bush	2	0	1	0	1	0
	FW	(England) ENG	Billy Cairns	1	0	1	0	0	0
	FW	(England) ENG	Len Carney	2	3	2	3	0	0
	MF	(England) ENG	George Carter	1	0	1	0	0	0
	MF	(England) ENG	George Collister	3	1	3	1	0	0
	DF	(Republic of Ireland) IRL	Billy Cook	1	0	1	0	0	0
	DF	(England) ENG	Dennis Cook	13	1	12	1	1	0
	DF	(England) ENG	Stan Cullis	8	0	8	0	0	0
	FW	(England) ENG	Cyril Done	17	13	16	12	1	1
	FW	(England) ENG	Dicky Dorsett	6	8	5	8	1	0
	FW	(England) ENG	George Drury	4	3	4	3	0	0
	MF	(England) ENG	Stan Eastham	8	1	7	0	1	1
	FW	(Scotland) SCO	Willie Fagan	19	6	19	6	0	0
	GK	(England) ENG	Bill Fairhurst	1	0	1	0	0	0
	DF	(England) ENG	George Farrow	1	0	1	0	0	0
	DF		Charles Fazackerley	2	0	2	0	0	0
	MF	(England) ENG	Tom Grosvenor	1	0	0	0	1	0
	DF	(England) ENG	Arnold Grundy	5	2	5	2	0	0
	MF	(England) ENG	Alf Hanson	3	0	3	0	0	0
	DF	(Scotland) SCO	Jim Harley	6	0	6	0	0	0
	GK	(England) ENG	Alf Hobson	10	0	10	0	0	0
	FW	(England) ENG	George Hunt	7	5	7	5	0	0
	MF	(England) ENG	Lloyd Iceton	1	0	1	0	0	0
	DF	(England) ENG	George Jackson	13	0	13	0	0	0
	DF	(England) ENG	Harry Kaye	15	0	15	0	0	0
	MF	(Scotland) SCO	Bill Kinghorn	1	0	0	0	1	0
	DF	(Wales) WAL	Ray Lambert	39	0	37	0	2	0
	MF	(England) ENG	Charlie Lewis	1	0	1	0	0	0
	MF	(Scotland) SCO	Billy Liddell	37	12	35	10	2	2
	MF	(England) ENG	Charlie Longdon	1	0	1	0	0	0
	MF	(Scotland) SCO	Jock Loran	1	0	1	0	0	0
	FW	(Scotland) SCO	Tommy Lyon	1	1	1	1	0	0
	GK	(England) ENG	Eric Mansley	6	0	4	0	2	0
	DF	(England) ENG	Alfred Massey	1	0	1	0	0	0
	MF	(South Africa) RSA	Berry Nieuwenhuys	21	15	21	15	0	0
	FW	(Scotland) SCO	Frank O'Donnell	2	1	2	1	0	0
			Patrick Owens	4	0	4	0	0	0
	DF	(England) ENG	Bob Paisley	27	10	25	10	2	0
	FW	(England) ENG	Stan Palk	21	1	21	1	0	0
	DF	(Scotland) SCO	George Paterson	1	0	1	0	0	0
			Stanley Pickstock	3	1	3	1	0	0
	DF	(England) ENG	Barney Ramsden	1	0	1	0	0	0
	GK	(England) ENG	Jack Robinson	2	0	2	0	0	0
	FW	(England) ENG	Jack Search	1	1	1	1	0	0
			Ken Seddon	8	0	8	0	0	0
	FW	(England) ENG	John Shafto	2	1	2	1	0	0
	DF	(England) ENG	Eddie Spicer	31	0	29	0	2	0
	DF	(England) ENG	Bobby Stuart	15	0	14	0	1	0
	GK		Bill Teasdale	2	0	2	0	0	0
	DF		Norman Turner	12	0	10	0	2	0
	FW	(England) ENG	Dennis Westcott	3	6	2	6	1	0
	DF	(Scotland) SCO	Jimmy Woodburn	3	0	3	0	0	0
	GK	(England) ENG	Albert Yoxon	1	0	1	0	0	0

== Competitions ==
=== North Region War League and Lancashire Senior Cup ===
31 August 1940 1	Liverpool	3–3	Preston North End	Liverpool
	O'Donnell; Fagan; Nieuwenhuys	Report	Goal	Stadium: Anfield; Attendance: 5,000

7 September 1940 2	Blackburn Rovers	0–3	Liverpool	Blackburn
		Report	Nieuwenhuys 30'; Fagan 80', 89'	Stadium: Ewood Park; Attendance: 2,176

14 September 1940 3	Liverpool	1–1	Blackburn Rovers	Liverpool
	Nieuwenhuys	Report	Goal	Stadium: Anfield; Attendance: 5,000

21 September 1940 4	Preston North End	5–0	Liverpool	Leyland
	Goal	Report		Stadium: County Ground; Attendance: 3,000

28 September 1940 5	Chester	0–2	Liverpool	Chester
	Westcott	Report	Westcott	Stadium: Sealand Road; Attendance: 2,500

5 October 1940 6	Liverpool	9–1	Chester	Liverpool
	Nieuwenhuys; Paisley; Westcott; Drury	Report	Goal	Stadium: Anfield; Attendance: 5,000

12 October 1940 7	Bury	0–3	Liverpool	Bury
		Report	Drury; Nieuwenhuys	Stadium: Gigg Lane; Attendance: 5,000

19 October 1940 8	Liverpool	0–4	Manchester City	Liverpool
		Report	Currier	Stadium: Anfield; Attendance: 8,000

26 October 1940 9	Stockport County	2–0	Liverpool	Stockport
	Goal	Report		Stadium: Edgeley Park; Attendance: 2,000

2 November 1940 10	Liverpool	5–0	Stockport County	Liverpool
	Grundy; Hunt; Nieuwenhuys; Paisley	Report		Stadium: Anfield; Attendance: 1,000

9 November 1940 11	Manchester City	5–1	Liverpool	Manchester
	Herd; Currier; Pritchard	Report	Hunt	Stadium: Maine Road; Attendance: 2,000

16 November 1940 12	Liverpool	3–0	Bury	Liverpool
	Hunt; Nieuwenhuys; Atkinson (o.g.)	Report		Stadium: Anfield; Attendance: 3,000

23 November 1940 13	Liverpool	2–2	Manchester United	Liverpool
	Hunt 20'; Fagan 23'	Report	Smith; Warner	Stadium: Anfield; Attendance: 3,000

30 November 1940 14	Manchester United	2–0	Liverpool	Manchester
	Butt; Smith	Report		Stadium: Old Trafford; Attendance: 700

7 December 1940 15	Tranmere Rovers	3–1	Liverpool	Birkenhead
	Goal	Report	Grundy	Stadium: Prenton Park; Attendance: 1,500

14 December 1940 16	Liverpool	6–4	New Brighton	Liverpool
	Nieuwenhuys; Paisley; Liddell (pen.)	Report	Goal	Stadium: Anfield; Attendance: 1,000

25 December 1940 17	Liverpool	3–1	Everton	Liverpool
	Carney 70', 85'; Nieuwenhuys 71'	Report	Goal	Stadium: Anfield; Attendance: 5,000

28 December 1940 18	Liverpool	2–3	Tranmere Rovers	Liverpool
	Carney; Liddell	Report	Goal	Stadium: Anfield; Attendance: 3,000

4 January 1941 19	Liverpool	1–2	Everton	Liverpool
	Paisley	Report	Goal	Stadium: Anfield; Attendance: 3,000
Note: Also counted as Round One 1st Leg for the Lancashire Senior Cup.

11 January 1941 20	Everton	4–1	Liverpool	Liverpool
	Goal	Report	Shafto 15'	Stadium: Goodison Park; Attendance: 5,000
Note: Also counted as Round One 2nd Leg for the Lancashire Senior Cup.

18 January 1941 21	Oldham Athletic	0–3	Liverpool	Oldham
		Report	Collister; Paisley; Search	Stadium: Boundary Park; Attendance: 500

8 February 1941 22	Liverpool	1–3	Everton	Liverpool
	Done	Report	Goal	Stadium: Anfield; Attendance: 3,000

1 March 1941 23	Bury	2–5	Liverpool	Bury
	Goal	Report	Done; Dorsett; Liddell	Stadium: Gigg Lane; Attendance: 2,000

8 March 1941 24	Liverpool	7–2	Wrexham	Liverpool
	Done; Dorsett; Liddell; Paisley	Report	Goal	Stadium: Anfield; Attendance: 1,500

15 March 1941 25	Blackpool	6–4	Liverpool	Blackpool
	Goal	Report	Done; Fagan (pen.) (pen.); Paisley	Stadium: Bloomfield Road; Attendance: 7,000

22 March 1941 26	Liverpool	2–6	Blackpool	Liverpool
	Dorsett	Report	Goal	Stadium: Anfield; Attendance: 3,000

29 March 1941 27	Bury	1–5	Liverpool	Bury
	Goal	Report	Done; Dorsett; Liddell; Pickstock	Stadium: Gigg Lane; Attendance: 1,500

5 April 1941 28	Liverpool	2–0	Bury	Liverpool
	Done; Palk	Report		Stadium: Anfield; Attendance: 2,000

12 April 1941 29	Blackpool	0–0	Liverpool	Blackpool
		Report		Stadium: Bloomfield Road; Attendance: 4,000

14 April 1941 30	Southport	2–0	Liverpool	Southport
	Goal	Report		Stadium: Haig Avenue; Attendance: 1,500

26 April 1941 31	Liverpool	2–1	Manchester United	Liverpool
	Done; Liddell	Report	Rowley	Stadium: Anfield; Attendance: 2,000

3 May 1941 32	Manchester United	1–1	Liverpool	Manchester
	Rowley	Report	Done	Stadium: Maine Road; Attendance: 1,500

17 May 1941 33	Wrexham	4–3	Liverpool	Wrexham
	Goal	Report	Liddell; Nieuwenhuys; Paisley	Stadium: Racecourse Ground; Attendance: 1,200

24 May 1941 34	Chester	1–6	Liverpool	Chester
	Goal	Report	D. Cook; Done; Liddell; Cole (o.g.)	Stadium: Sealand Road; Attendance: 700

31 May 1941 35	Liverpool	2–2	Everton	Liverpool
	Liddell 47'; Done 69'	Report	Mercer; Stevenson	Stadium: Anfield; Attendance: 6,000

2 June 1941 36	Everton	3–1	Liverpool	Liverpool
	Boyes 59', 75'; Jackson 76'	Report	Jones (o.g.)	Stadium: Goodison Park; Attendance: 4,000

7 June 1941 37	Preston North End	6–1	Liverpool	Preston
	Goal	Report	Lyon	Stadium: Deepdale; Attendance: 5,000

=== Football League War Cup ===
15 February 1941 1	Liverpool	2–3	Southport	Liverpool
	Liddell (pen.)	Report	Goal	Stadium: Anfield; Attendance: 3,000

22 February 1941 1	Southport	2–2 (5–4 agg.)	Liverpool	Southport
	Goal	Report	Done; Eastham	Stadium: Haig Avenue; Attendance: 4,000
