= 1937–38 Liverpool F.C. season =

English football club season

Liverpool
1937–38 season
- Manager: George Kay
- Stadium: Anfield
- First Division: 11th
- FA Cup: Fifth round
- Top goalscorer: League: Alf Hanson (14); All: Alf Hanson (15)
- Highest home attendance: 57,682 (v Huddersfield Town, FA Cup, 12 February)
- Lowest home attendance: 14,656 (v Birmingham, League, 6 April)
- Average home league attendance: 27,690
Home colours	Away colours

The 1937–38 season was the 46th season in Liverpool F.C.'s existence, and the club ended the season in 11th place. Liverpool reached the fifth round of the FA Cup but were knocked out by Huddersfield Town.

== Squad statistics ==
=== Appearances and goals ===
No.	Pos	Nat	Player	Total		Division 1		FA Cup	
No.	Pos	Nat	Player	Apps	Goals	Apps	Goals	Apps	Goals
	FW	(England) ENG	Jack Balmer	31	13	30	13	1	0
	DF	(England) ENG	Ernie Blenkinsop	2	0	2	0	0	0
	DF	(Scotland) SCO	Tom Bradshaw	2	0	2	0	0	0
	DF	(England) ENG	John Browning	5	0	5	0	0	0
	DF	(Scotland) SCO	Matt Busby	36	0	33	0	3	0
	DF	(England) ENG	Tom Bush	29	0	24	0	5	0
	DF	(England) ENG	Tommy Cooper	31	0	26	0	5	0
	DF	(England) ENG	Ben Dabbs	6	0	6	0	0	0
	FW	(England) ENG	Harry Eastham	16	0	15	0	1	0
	FW	(Scotland) SCO	Willie Fagan	36	9	31	8	5	1
	MF	(England) ENG	Alf Hanson	42	15	37	14	5	1
	DF	(Scotland) SCO	Jim Harley	38	0	33	0	5	0
	FW	(England) ENG	Ted Harston	5	3	5	3	0	0
	GK	(England) ENG	Alf Hobson	1	0	1	0	0	0
	DF	(Republic of Ireland) IRL	Billy Hood	3	0	3	0	0	0
	FW	(England) ENG	Fred Howe	11	0	9	0	2	0
	DF	(Wales) WAL	Ronnie Jones	2	1	2	1	0	0
	GK	(South Africa) RSA	Dirk Kemp	13	0	13	0	0	0
	DF	(Scotland) SCO	Jimmy McDougall	17	0	17	0	0	0
	DF	(Scotland) SCO	Jimmy McInnes	11	1	11	1	0	0
	MF	(South Africa) RSA	Berry Nieuwenhuys	45	13	40	13	5	0
	DF	(England) ENG	Barney Ramsden	15	0	14	0	1	0
	GK	(South Africa) RSA	Arthur Riley	33	0	28	0	5	0
	DF	(England) ENG	Fred Rogers	28	0	24	0	4	0
	DF	(England) ENG	Ted Savage	5	0	5	0	0	0
	FW	(England) ENG	John Shafto	16	7	13	6	3	1
	FW	(Scotland) SCO	Alex Smith	1	0	1	0	0	0
	DF	(England) ENG	Phil Taylor	34	6	29	6	5	0
	MF	(South Africa) RSA	Harman van den Berg	3	0	3	0	0	0

== Table ==
Pos	Team	Pld	W	D	L	GF	GA	GAv	Pts
9	Leeds United	42	14	15	13	64	69	0.928	43
10	Chelsea	42	14	13	15	65	65	1.000	41
11	Liverpool	42	15	11	16	65	71	0.915	41
12	Blackpool	42	16	8	18	61	66	0.924	40
13	Derby County	42	15	10	17	66	87	0.759	40

Source: World Football
Rules for classification: 1) Points; 2) Goal average; 3) Goals scored
