= 1949–50 Liverpool F.C. season =

English football club season

Liverpool
1949–50 season
- Manager: George Kay
- First Division: 8th
- FA Cup: Runners-up
- Top goalscorer: League: Billy Liddell (17); All: Billy Liddell (19)
- Highest home attendance: 58,757 (v Chelsea, League 27 December)
- Lowest home attendance: 33,464 (v Blackpool, League, 8 March)
- Average home league attendance: 45,783
Home colours	Away colours

The 1949–50 season was the 58th season in Liverpool F.C.'s existence, and ended with the club finishing eighth in the table. Liverpool had played the first 19 games of the season unbeaten up to the middle of December and despite losing games after this, still remained top of the league on Good Friday. On Easter Sunday, Liverpool lost 5–1 away to Newcastle and went on to lose three of their last four games, ultimately finishing the season in eighth place, five points off ultimate league winners Portsmouth.

They also reached the FA Cup Final but lost 2–0 to Arsenal.

== Squad ==
=== Goalkeepers ===
- (England) Charlie Ashcroft
- (England) Ray Minshull
- (Wales) Cyril Sidlow

=== Defenders ===
- (Scotland) Joe Cadden
- (Scotland) Frank Christie
- (England) John Heydon
- (England) Laurie Hughes
- (England) Bill Jones
- (Wales) Ray Lambert
- (England) Bob Paisley
- (England) Bill Shepherd
- (Scotland) Sam Shields
- (England) Eddie Spicer
- (England) Phil Taylor

=== Midfielders ===
- (England) Ken Brierley
- (Scotland) Billy Liddell
- (Scotland) Tommy McLeod
- (England) Jimmy Payne
- (England) Bryan Williams

=== Forwards ===
- (England) Jack Balmer
- (England) Kevin Baron
- (England) Cyril Done
- (Scotland) Willie Fagan
- (England) Albert Stubbins

== Squad statistics ==
=== Appearances and goals ===
No.	Pos	Nat	Player	Total		Division 1		FA Cup	
No.	Pos	Nat	Player	Apps	Goals	Apps	Goals	Apps	Goals
	FW	(England) ENG	Jack Balmer	9	1	9	1	0	0
	FW	(England) ENG	Kevin Baron	45	8	38	7	7	1
	MF	(England) ENG	Ken Brierley	11	5	11	5	0	0
	DF	(Scotland) SCO	Frank Christie	4	0	4	0	0	0
	FW	(England) ENG	Cyril Done	15	5	15	5	0	0
	FW	(Scotland) SCO	Willie Fagan	42	15	35	11	7	4
	DF	(England) ENG	Laurie Hughes	41	0	35	0	6	0
	DF	(England) ENG	Bill Jones	29	0	26	0	3	0
	DF	(Wales) WAL	Ray Lambert	48	1	41	1	7	0
	MF	(Scotland) SCO	Billy Liddell	48	20	41	18	7	2
	GK	(England) ENG	Ray Minshull	5	0	5	0	0	0
	DF	(England) ENG	Bob Paisley	28	2	23	1	5	1
	MF	(England) ENG	Jimmy Payne	38	7	31	5	7	2
	DF	(England) ENG	Bill Shepherd	6	0	6	0	0	0
	FW	(Scotland) SCO	Sam Shields	1	0	1	0	0	0
	GK	(Wales) WAL	Cyril Sidlow	44	0	37	0	7	0
	DF	(England) ENG	Eddie Spicer	44	0	37	0	7	0
	FW	(England) ENG	Albert Stubbins	36	11	29	10	7	1
	DF	(England) ENG	Phil Taylor	44	0	37	0	7	0
	MF	(England) ENG	Billy Watkinson	1	0	1	0	0	0

== Table ==
Pos	Team	Pld	W	D	L	GF	GA	GAv	Pts
6	Arsenal	42	19	11	12	79	55	1.436	49
7	Blackpool	42	17	15	10	46	35	1.314	49
8	Liverpool	42	17	14	11	64	54	1.185	48
9	Middlesbrough	42	20	7	15	59	48	1.229	47
10	Burnley	42	16	13	13	40	40	1.000	45

Source: World Football
Rules for classification: 1) Points; 2) Goal average; 3) Goals scored

== Results ==
=== First Division ===
Date	Opponents	Venue	Result	Scorers	Attendance	Report 1	Report 2
20-Aug-49	Sunderland	H	4–2	Paisley 32' Balmer 42' Baron 63' Stubbins 73'	49,811	Report	Report
22-Aug-49	Stoke City	A	0–0		27,255	Report	Report
27-Aug-49	Everton	A	0–0		70,812	Report	Report
31-Aug-49	Stoke City	H	1–1	Liddell 28'	38,097	Report	Report
03-Sep-49	Arsenal	A	2–1	Stubbins 38', 75'	51,866	Report	Report
07-Sep-49	Manchester United	H	1–1	Stubbins 76'	51,857	Report	Report
10-Sep-49	Bolton Wanderers	H	1–1	Baron 62'	44,212	Report	Report
17-Sep-49	Birmingham City	A	3–2	Done 2' Liddell 70', 74'	37,859	Report	Report
24-Sep-49	Derby County	H	3–1	Baron 5' Fagan 20' Payne 30'	54,512	Report	Report
01-Oct-49	West Bromwich Albion	A	1–0	Stubbins 37'	44,219	Report	Report
08-Oct-49	Middlesbrough	H	2–0	Payne 74' Lambert pen 77'	49,569	Report	Report
15-Oct-49	Blackpool	A	0–0		33,675	Report	Report
22-Oct-49	Newcastle United	H	2–2	Liddell 6' Baron 70'	48,987	Report	Report
29-Oct-49	Fulham	A	1–0	Liddell 15'	41,870	Report	Report
05-Nov-49	Manchester City	H	4–0	Liddell ?', pen 11' Brierley 21' Baron	50,536	Report	Report
12-Nov-49	Charlton Athletic	A	3–1	Done 35' Liddell 42', pen 73'	41,166	Report	Report
19-Nov-49	Aston Villa	H	2–1	Liddell 2' Brierley 82'	50,293	Report	Report
26-Nov-49	Wolverhampton Wanderers	A	1–1	Fagan 27'	52,509	Report	Report
03-Dec-49	Portsmouth	H	2–2	Done 29', 50'	44,851	Report	Report
10-Dec-49	Huddersfield Town	A	2–3	Fagan 4' Brierley 24'	25,767	Report	Report
17-Dec-49	Sunderland	A	2–3	Brierley 8' Done 15'	46,515	Report	Report
24-Dec-49	Everton	H	3–1	Baron 56', ?' Fagan	50,485	Report	Report
26-Dec-49	Chelsea	A	1–1	Fagan 88'	55,920	Report	Report
27-Dec-49	Chelsea	H	2–2	Fagan 51', 59'	58,757	Report	Report
31-Dec-49	Arsenal	H	2–0	Liddell 32' Own goal 82'	55,020	Report	Report
14-Jan-50	Bolton Wanderers	A	2–3	Liddell 80' Fagan 81'	41,507	Report	Report
21-Jan-50	Birmingham City	H	2–0	Payne 23' Stubbins 69'	37,668	Report	Report
04-Feb-50	Derby County	A	2–2	Stubbins 65' Liddell	36,835	Report	Report
18-Feb-50	West Bromwich Albion	H	2–1	Stubbins 12' Brierley 87'	46,634	Report	Report
25-Feb-50	Middlesbrough	A	1–4	Stubbins 41'	31,804	Report	Report
08-Mar-50	Blackpool	H	0–1		33,464	Report	Report
11-Mar-50	Aston Villa	A	0–2		40,820	Report	Report
15-Mar-50	Manchester United	A	0–0		45,283	Report	Report
18-Mar-50	Wolverhampton Wanderers	H	0–2		41,216	Report	Report
29-Mar-50	Manchester City	A	2–1	Liddell Payne	22,661	Report	Report
01-Apr-50	Charlton Athletic	H	1–0	Liddell pen 20'	39,721	Report	Report
07-Apr-50	Burnley	A	2–0	Payne 47' Liddell 51'	33,025	Report	Report
08-Apr-50	Newcastle United	A	1–5	Fagan 29'	48,639	Report	Report
10-Apr-50	Burnley	H	0–1		43,716	Report	Report
15-Apr-50	Fulham	H	1–1	Fagan 50'	36,274	Report	Report
22-Apr-50	Portsmouth	A	1–2	Stubbins 52'	46,927	Report	Report
03-May-50	Huddersfield Town	H	2–3	Fagan 10' Liddell 56'	35,763	Report	Report

=== FA Cup ===
Date	Opponents	Venue	Result	Scorers	Attendance	Report 1	Report 2
07-Jan-50	Blackburn Rovers	A	0–0		52,468	Report	Report
11-Jan-50	Blackburn Rovers	H	2–1	Payne 32' Fagan 51'	52,221	Report	Report
28-Jan-50	Exeter City	H	3–1	Baron 45' Fagan 82' Payne 88'	45,209	Report	Report
11-Feb-50	Stockport County	A	2–1	Fagan 57' Stubbins 70'	27,833	Report	Report
04-Mar-50	Blackpool	H	2–1	Fagan 19' Liddell 81'	53,973	Report	Report
25-Mar-50	Everton	A	2–0	Paisley 29' Liddell 62'	72,000	Report	Report

=== Final ===
29 April 1950
15:00 BST

Arsenal	2–0	Liverpool
Lewis 18' 63'	Report; Report

Wembley Stadium, London
Attendance: 100,000
Referee: Harry Pearce

Arsenal	Liverpool

GK	1	(England) George Swindin
RB	2	(England) Laurie Scott
LB	3	(Wales) Walley Barnes
HB	4	(Scotland) Alex Forbes
HB	5	(England) Leslie Compton
HB	6	(England) Joe Mercer (c)
OF	7	(England) Freddie Cox
IF	8	(Scotland) Jimmy Logie
CF	9	(England) Peter Goring
IF	10	(England) Reg Lewis
OF	11	(England) Denis Compton
Manager:
(England) Tom Whittaker

GK	1	(Wales) Cyril Sidlow
RB	2	(Wales) Ray Lambert
LB	3	(England) Eddie Spicer
RH	4	(England) Phil Taylor (c)
CH	5	(England) Laurie Hughes
LH	6	(England) Bill Jones
OR	7	(England) Jimmy Payne
IR	8	(England) Kevin Baron
CF	9	(England) Albert Stubbins
IL	10	(Scotland) Willie Fagan
OL	11	(Scotland) Billy Liddell
Manager:
(England) George Kay
