= Easdale (disambiguation) =

Easdale may refer to:

== Places ==
- Easdale, an island and settlement on the west coast of Scotland
- Easdale, Kansas, United States, a ghost town

== People ==
Notable people with this surname include:

- Brian Easdale (1909–1995), British composer
- Fiona Easdale (born 1959), British alpine skier
- Joan Adeney Easdale (1913–1998), English poet
- John Easdale (born 1961), American singer and songwriter
- John Easdale (footballer) (1919–1999), Scottish footballer
- Joy Easdale, fictional character
