= Walter Balmer =

Walter Balmer may refer to:

- Billy Balmer (1875–1961), English footballer
- Walter Balmer (footballer) (1948–2010), Swiss international footballer
