= Bob Balmer =

English footballer (1882–?)

Personal information
- Date of birth: 1 January 1882
- Place of birth: Liverpool, England

Youth career
- Everton

Senior career*
Years	Team	Apps	(Gls)
1903–1912	Everton	165	(0)
Total		165	(0)
- * Club domestic league appearances and goals

Robert Balmer (born 1 January 1882) was an English professional footballer who played for Everton between 1903 and 1912. His brother Billy and nephew Jack were also professional footballers.

In the 1903–04 season Balmer scored an own goal, the final goal of an FA Cup game, allowing Tottenham Hotspur to progress to the next round.
