= Ron Jones (footballer) =

Welsh footballer

Ron Jones (18 June 1914 – 20 March 2010) was a Welsh footballer who played as a defender. He played in the football league for Wrexham and Liverpool. He also guested for Crewe Alexandra during the war. He was 5 ft 7 1/2 in (1.71 m) tall.
