= William Hood (footballer) =

Northern Irish association footballer

Personal information
- Date of birth: 3 November 1914
- Place of birth: Belfast, Northern Ireland
- Position: Defender

Senior career*
| Years | Team | Apps | (Gls) |
| 1937 | Liverpool | 3 | (0) |
- * Club domestic league appearances and goals

William Hood (born 3 November 1914, date of death unknown) was a Northern Irish footballer who played as a defender. Hood made three appearances for Liverpool during the 1937–38 season as a replacement for the injured full back Tom Cooper. Hood also played for Cliftonville and Derry City in his native Northern Ireland.
