= Alex Smith (footballer, born 1915) =

Scottish footballer

Alexander Smith (born 17 January 1915, date of death unknown) was a Scottish footballer who played as a striker.

Captain Smith was also the recipient of a military cross for action in Burma while on secondment from the Gordon Highlanders to the 1/10 Gurkha Rifles
