= Bart Purvis =

English footballer

Personal information
- Full name: Bartholomew Purvis
- Date of birth: 15 October 1919
- Place of birth: Gateshead, England
- Date of death: June 2001 (aged 81)
- Place of death: Gateshead, England
- Position: Left back

Senior career*
Years	Team	Apps	(Gls)
–1946	North Shields		
1946	Everton	0	(0)
1946–1947	Gateshead	1	(0)
1947	Reading	0	(0)
1947–1948	Plymouth Argyle	0	(0)
1948–1951	Notts County	25	(0)
1951–1952	Carlisle United	4	(0)
1952	Hartlepools United	0	(0)
- * Club domestic league appearances and goals

Bartholomew Purvis (15 October 1919 – June 2001) was an English professional footballer who played in the Football League for Notts County, Carlisle United and Gateshead as a left back.

== Career statistics ==
Appearances and goals by club, season and competition
Club	Season	League			FA Cup		Total	
Club	Season	Division	Apps	Goals	Apps	Goals	Apps	Goals
Notts County	1948–49	Third Division South	21	0	0	0	21	0
Notts County	1949–50	Third Division South	3	0	0	0	3	0
Notts County	1950–51	Second Division	1	0	0	0	1	0
Career total			25	0	0	0	25	0
