= Jackie Wharton =

English footballer

Personal information
- Date of birth: 18 June 1920
- Place of birth: Bolton, England
- Date of death: 1997 (aged 76–77)
- Position: Winger

Youth career
- 1936–1938: Bolton Wanderers

Senior career*
Years	Team	Apps	(Gls)
1938–1939	Plymouth Argyle	11	(2)
1946–1947	Preston North End	25	(7)
1947–1948	Manchester City	23	(2)
1948–1953	Blackburn Rovers	129	(14)
1953–1955	Newport County	74	(10)
- Wigan Athletic
Total		262	(35)
- * Club domestic league appearances and goals

Jackie Wharton (18 June 1920 – 1997) was an English footballer who played in the Football League for Plymouth Argyle, Preston North End, Manchester City, Blackburn Rovers and Newport County. His son Terry was also a professional footballer.

== Career ==
Wharton began his career with his local team, Bolton Wanderers and after failing to make the grade at Burnden Park he left for Plymouth Argyle in August 1938. Wharton made his debut against West Bromwich Albion in September 1938 scoring twice in a 2–1 victory. His early promise lead to him joining Preston North End just before the outbreak of World War II. Upon returning to Lancashire Wharton guested for a number of clubs such as Blackburn, Bolton, and Liverpool. When football resumed in 1946 he went on to play for Preston and then Manchester City before joining Blackburn Rovers in 1948. He spent five years at Ewood Park playing 129 times for Rovers in the league scoring 14 goals. He later played for Newport County and Wigan Athletic.
