= Dick Burke (footballer, born 1920) =

English footballer

Personal information
- Date of birth: 28 October 1920
- Place of birth: Ashton-under-Lyne, England
- Date of death: 2004 (aged 83–84)
- Position: Left back

Senior career*
Years	Team	Apps	(Gls)
- Droylsden
1938–1945	Blackpool	1	(0)
1946	Newcastle United	15	(0)
1947–1948	Carlisle United	77	(8)
- Ashton United
- * Club domestic league appearances and goals

Richard J. Burke (28 October 1920 – 2004) was an English professional footballer. A left back or right back, he played in the Football League for Blackpool, Newcastle United and Carlisle United.

== Career ==
Ashton-under-Lyne-born Burke began his career with Droylsden in the 1930s. He joined Blackpool in 1938, but made only one Football League appearance in his seven years with the Seasiders.

In 1946, he joined Newcastle United, for whom he made fifteen League appearances.

In 1947, he moved a few miles south to sign for Carlisle United. He made 77 League appearances in total, and scored his first league goal for them. He scored eight in total for United.
