= Fred Nickson =

English footballer

Harry Wheeler "Fred" Nickson (born 25 January 1919, date of death unknown) was an English footballer who played as a goalkeeper. He played three times for Liverpool in the 1945–46 FA Cup, and also appeared in ten Football League (North) games.
