= Tom White (footballer, born 1924) =

English footballer

Personal information
- Full name: Thomas White
- Date of birth: 10 November 1924
- Place of birth: High Hold, England
- Date of death: 1998 (aged 73–74)
- Position: Inside forward

Senior career*
Years	Team	Apps	(Gls)
1944–1945	Chester Moor Amateurs		
1945–1947	Sunderland	2	(1)
1947–19??	Worcester City		
- * Club domestic league appearances and goals

Thomas White (10 November 1924 – 1998) was an English professional footballer who played as an inside forward for Sunderland.
