= Billy Balmer =

English footballer (1875–1961)

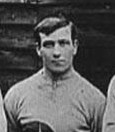
- Balmer with Everton in 1906

Personal information
- Full name: William Atherton Balmer
- Date of birth: 29 July 1875
- Place of birth: West Derby, England
- Date of death: February 1961 (aged 85)
- Place of death: Huddersfield, England
- Position: Right-back

Youth career
- Aintree Church
- South Shore

Senior career*
| Years | Team | Apps | (Gls) |
| 1897–1908 | Everton | 293 | (1) |
| 1909–1911 | Croydon Common | 43 | (1) |
| 1912 | Chester | 2 | (0) |
| Total | | 338 | (2) |

International career
| 1905 | England | 1 | (0) |
- * Club domestic league appearances and goals

Billy Balmer (29 July 1875 – February 1961) was an English footballer who played as a right-back for Everton, as well as the England national side. His brother Bob played alongside him for Everton and his nephew was Jack Balmer.

== Career ==
Balmer was a tough-tackling full-back. He joined Everton in 1897 from South Shore and went on to play 331 games. He netted eight goals during open play, all them own goals however; his only goal for Everton was a single penalty in 1899.

His brother Bob, 4 years his junior, also played for Everton. His nephew, Jack, attained fame with local rivals Liverpool.

His only England appearance came in a 1–1 draw with Ireland in 1905.

Balmer spent the 1909–10 and 1910–11 seasons in the Southern League with Croydon Common, making 64 appearances and scoring four goals. In 1912, 35-year-old Balmer joined Chester in the Lancashire Combination, but he left after just two games as he was deemed to be too slow and past his best.

In 1921, Balmer was appointed as trainer at Huddersfield Town and progressed to become a coach with the club.
