= Sam Shields (footballer) =

Scottish footballer

Personal information
- Full name: Samuel Miller Shields
- Date of birth: 21 March 1929
- Place of birth: Denny, Scotland
- Date of death: 13 September 1986 (aged 57)
- Place of death: Denny, Scotland
- Position: Inside forward

Youth career
- Dunipace

Senior career*
Years	Team	Apps	(Gls)
1946–1949	Cowdenbeath	33	(7)
1949–1951	Liverpool	1	(0)
1951–1952	Airdrie	0	(0)
1952–1953	Darlington	21	(2)
- Horden Colliery Welfare
Total		56	(9)
- * Club domestic league appearances and goals

Sam Shields (21 March 1929 – 13 September 1986) was a Scottish footballer, who played as an inside forward.
