= Fred Finney =

English footballer

Fred Finney (10 March 1924 – January 2005) was an English footballer who played as a defender player. He played for Liverpool FC in 1946, making his debut along with Bob Paisley and Billy Liddell in a 2 - 0 win away at Chester City, in the FA Cup 3rd round 1st leg. He made only two appearances with Liverpool FC.

Finney also played for South Liverpool and Prescot Cables.
