= Cyril Done =

English footballer (1920–1993)

Personal information
- Full name: Cyril Charles Done
- Date of birth: 21 October 1920
- Place of birth: Liverpool, England
- Date of death: 24 February 1993 (aged 72)
- Place of death: Formby, Liverpool, England
- Position: Centre-forward

Youth career
- Bootle Boys' Brigade

Senior career*
Years	Team	Apps	(Gls)
1938–1952	Liverpool	93	(32)
1952–1954	Tranmere Rovers	87	(61)
1954–1957	Port Vale	52	(34)
1957–1959	Winsford United		
1959–1962	Skelmersdale United		
Total		232+	(127+)

Managerial career
- 1959–1962: Skelmersdale United
- * Club domestic league appearances and goals

Cyril Charles Done (21 October 1920 – 24 February 1993) was an English footballer. A centre-forward, he scored 127 goals in 232 league appearances in the Football League.

He began his career at Liverpool just before the outbreak of World War II and was a prolific goalscorer at Anfield throughout the war. After the war, he helped the "Reds" to the First Division title in 1946–47 before falling out of the first-team picture until his departure to Tranmere Rovers in May 1952. He hit 61 goals in 87 league appearances at Prenton Park, before he moved to Port Vale in December 1954. He hit four goals against Liverpool and hit 34 goals in 52 league games before switching to non-League Winsford United in May 1957. He later served Skelmersdale United as player-manager from 1959 to 1962.

== Career ==
=== Liverpool ===
Born in Liverpool, Done played for Bootle Boys' Brigade before being spotted as a 17-year-old by "Reds" manager George Kay who took him to Anfield in January 1938. He made his debut 18 months later, on 2 September 1939, in a 1–0 home win over Chelsea; Done got the winner, thus opening his account in the same match. This game was the last 'official' game for six years due to the outbreak of World War II; he scored 147 goals in 137 games during the war. Done rejoined Liverpool after the war; after missing the first nine games of the 1946–47 season, he made an impact on the side by scoring the "Reds" goal in their 1–1 home draw with Charlton. He then followed this up by scoring his first hat-trick for the club on 19 October 1946 at Leeds Road, his goals, which came in the 29th, 43rd and 76th minute, along with a Jack Balmer last-minute strike helped humble their hosts, Huddersfield, by a 4–1 scoreline. He repeated this feat, this time at Anfield on 12 February 1947 in a 5–0 victory over Grimsby; his goals came in the 24th, 40th and 85th minutes; Willie Fagan scored the other two in the 30th and 32nd minutes. Done's contribution in his 17 league appearances, scoring 10 goals, went a long way in helping Liverpool go on to win the first post-war championship. Liverpool dropped to 14th in 1947–48, and Done played just six games.

The club finished in mid-table again in 1948–49, with Done scoring 13 goals in 28 games. Done struggled to hold down a place in the Liverpool starting line-up and completely missed out on the 1950 FA Cup run; he scored five goals in 16 league games. He scored three goals in 25 games in 1950–51, and got four goals in 12 games in 1951–52. Done was allowed to leave Anfield in May 1952, having played 111 games in official league and cup competitions, scoring 38 goals.

=== Tranmere Rovers ===
Done joined Merseyside neighbours Tranmere Rovers of the Third Division North, where he made more of an impact, scoring 61 goals in 87 league appearances in his time at the club. During his time at Prenton Park, Tranmere were a mid-table club under the stewardship of Ernest Blackburn. He departed midway through the 1954–55 campaign, though still ended up as that season's top-scorer, with more than double the tally of the second-highest scorer.

=== Port Vale ===
Cyril transferred to Port Vale in December 1954, when manager Freddie Steele paid out a four-figure fee. He scored in five consecutive games, as the club struggled in front of goal; he bagged six of Vale's eight goals in a run of just one win in nine games. He then faced his former employers, Liverpool, and gave them a reason to think that they had let him go too soon, as he got all four goals in Vale's 4–3 Second Division home win. He was the club's top scorer in 1954–55 with 13 goals in 18 appearances. Done then found the net 12 times in 18 games in 1956–57, with teammate Len Stephenson only scoring two more goals in almost twice the number of games. He hit nine goals in 16 games in 1956–57 to become the club's top-scorer in a dismal season at Vale Park, which saw the "Valiants" relegated in last place.

=== Later career ===
In May 1957 he was given a free transfer to non-League side Winsford United, and later became player-manager of Skelmersdale United.

== Style of play ==
Done was a "strong centre-forward, who was feared by opposing defences".

== Post-retirement ==
Upon retirement from the game, Done worked raising awareness for a cancer charity. He died on 24 February 1993, the same day as fellow footballer Bobby Moore.

== Career statistics ==
Appearances and goals by club, season and competition
Club	Season	League			FA Cup		Other		Total	
Club	Season	Division	Apps	Goals	Apps	Goals	Apps	Goals	Apps	Goals
Liverpool	1939–40		0	0	0	0	1	1	1	1
Liverpool	1946–47	First Division	17	10	6	2	—		23	12
Liverpool	1947–48	First Division	4	0	2	0	—		6	0
Liverpool	1948–49	First Division	24	11	4	1	—		28	12
Liverpool	1949–50	First Division	14	5	0	0	—		14	5
Liverpool	1950–51	First Division	24	3	1	0	—		25	3
Liverpool	1951–52	First Division	10	3	2	1	—		12	4
Liverpool	Total		93	32	15	4	1	1	109	37
Tranmere Rovers	1952–53	Third Division North	39	21	4	5	—		43	26
Tranmere Rovers	1953–54	Third Division North	30	25	4	7	—		34	32
Tranmere Rovers	1954–55	Third Division North	18	15	2	2	—		20	17
Tranmere Rovers	Total		87	61	10	14	0	0	97	75
Port Vale	1954–55	Second Division	18	13	0	0	—		18	13
Port Vale	1955–56	Second Division	18	12	0	0	—		18	12
Port Vale	1956–57	Second Division	16	9	0	0	—		16	9
Port Vale	Total		52	34	0	0	0	0	52	34
Career total			232	127	25	18	1	1	258	146

== Honours ==
Liverpool

- Football League First Division: 1946–47
