= Bobby Stuart =

English footballer

Bobby Stuart (9 October 1913 – 1987) was a professional footballer who played as a defender for Middlesbrough, Plymouth Argyle and Whitby Town. He was born in Middlesbrough, England.

== Career ==
Bobby Stuart gained 3 England International caps as a Schoolboy, from the age of 14 (All Wins) (played then at Half back).

Signed amateur for Middlesbrough FC aged 15, Professional at 17 and made his debut for Middlesbrough at Highbury against Arsenal at 19. As the last line of defence, during the 1934–35 season, he scored 5 own goals against Middlesbrough playing in Left back position.

Towards the end of the 1938 season Middlesbrough played Stoke who then had the legendary Stanley Matthews on the right wing. The match report stated 'Stuart staying close to Matthews prevented the maestro performing his usual magic.' When questioned how he managed to achieve the feat he stated "I respected Stanley's skill so I just kept my eye on the ball and shuffled him into the corner", this allowing the defence to be ready to manage any eventual cross.'

He continued in the Left back position until the outbreak of World War II when he joined the RAF as L.A.C. Post war he played for 'The Boro' from 1945 to 1947 before being transferred to Plymouth Argyle till 1949.

He made over 250 appearances for Middlesbrough who at the time were in Division 1 (now the Premiership).

He was said to be one of the hardest kickers of a dead ball with either foot and although playing Left back for most of his (leather) footballing life he played Centre half as a Schoolboy and in the RAF.

He was also credited with being the fastest fullback in English football an attribute he passed on to his Granddaughter Louise Collins (née Stuart) who competed at 200m in the 24th Olympiad in the Seoul Olympics for Great Britain in 1988.
