= Alex Muir =

Scottish footballer

Alexander Johnston Muir (10 December 1923 – 4 September 1995) was a Scottish footballer who played as a defender.
