= Bob Batey =

English footballer

Personal information
- Full name: Norman Robert Batey
- Date of birth: 18 October 1912
- Place of birth: Greenhead, England
- Date of death: 29 November 1998 (aged 86)
- Place of death: Chorley, England
- Height: 5 ft 8 1/2 in (1.74 m)
- Position: Defender

Senior career*
Years	Team	Apps	(Gls)
1932–1934	Carlisle United	23	(0)
1934–1939	Preston North End	90	(0)
1946–1947	Leeds United	8	(0)
1947–1948	Southport	29	(0)
–	Annfield Plain		
- * Club domestic league appearances and goals

Norman Robert Batey (18 October 1912 – 29 November 1998) was an English footballer who played in the Football League for Carlisle United, Preston North End, Leeds United and Southport.

== Honours ==
Preston North End

- FA Cup: 1937–38
