= Harman van den Berg =

South African footballer

Personal information
- Full name: Harman van den Berg
- Date of birth: 21 March 1918
- Place of birth: Cape Town
- Date of death: 6 August 2006 (aged 88)
- Position: Midfielder

Senior career*
Years	Team	Apps	(Gls)
- Peninsular
1937–1939	Liverpool F.C.	19	(3)
- * Club domestic league appearances and goals

Harman van den Berg (21 March 1918 – 6 August 2006) was a South African footballer who played as a midfielder.
