= Robert Priday =

South African footballer

Robert Priday (29 March 1925 – 30 September 1998) was a South African footballer who played as a midfielder for Liverpool F.C. in The Football League. Priday played for Cape Town City in his native South Africa before he moved to Liverpool in 1946. He made 9 appearances during the 1946–47 season, which was not enough for him to receive a winner's medal as Liverpool won the First Division. He made 25 appearances over the next two seasons, unable to become a first team regular he moved to Blackburn Rovers F.C.
