= Berry Nieuwenhuys =

South African soccer player

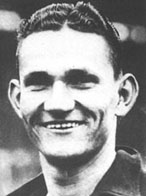
- Berry Nieuwenhuys in 1933

Personal information
- Date of birth: 5 November 1911
- Place of birth: Boksburg, Transvaal, Union of South Africa
- Date of death: 12 June 1984 (aged 72)
- Place of death: Johannesburg, South Africa
- Position: Outside right

Senior career*
Years	Team	Apps	(Gls)
- Boksburg
- Germiston Callies
1933–1947	Liverpool	239	(74)
- * Club domestic league appearances and goals

Berry Nieuwenhuys (5 November 1911 – 12 June 1984) was a South African footballer who played predominantly for Liverpool, which he was contracted to from 1933 to 1947. He retired in 1947, returning to South Africa to be employed at the Transvaal Country Club.

He occupied the position of outside right, akin to an advanced winger, but could play on the opposite flank. Nieuwenhuys became noted for his pace, technical skill, power of shot, and adeptness at heading. He made 260 appearances, scoring 79 goals - 74 of which had been amassed in the league. He attained double figures in goals scored in six consecutive seasons in the 1930s. The Second World War disrupted his career, forcing him to guest with Arsenal and West Ham while he served in the Royal Air Force.

Many supporters found his surname unpronounceable, so he was often referred to by the diminutive "Nivvy".

== Life and playing career ==
Born in Boksburg, Transvaal Province, Nieuwenhuys worked as an engineer and played for his hometown side Boksburg FC and the Germiston Callies before signing for Liverpool in September 1933. He became one of nine players from Boksburg to participate in the English and Scottish leagues during the 1930s. Liverpool, in particular, fielded at least six South Africans during the decade, including prolific goalscorer Gordon Hodgson. He debuted against Tottenham Hotspur on 23 September, in a First Division fixture at White Hart Lane, as a replacement for Harry Taylor on the right wing. It proved to be an auspicious beginning, with Liverpool defeating Tottenham 3–0. He contributed to two of the goals, through his accurate crosses to Alf Hanson and Sam English. He registered his first goal a week later, on 30 September, against city rivals Everton. His 32nd-minute strike, along with Hanson's 60th-minute and English's 80th-minute goals, gave Liverpool a 3–2 win.

The club's overall performances in the league were unremarkable during manager George Patterson's eight-year tenure. Liverpool's league form deteriorated dramatically in the 1935-36 season, in which the club finished 19th. Patterson, suffering from stress and serious illness, resigned and was replaced by Southampton's George Kay.

Along with his pace and quicksilver feet Nieuwenhuys could also hit a venomous shot and he would often be seen cutting in from the wide berth to unleash an unstoppable strike at goal.

In 1939, in recognition of Nieuwenhuys reaching five years at the club, Liverpool rewarded their midfielder with a benefit match against city rivals Everton. The occasion attracted 13,000 people and generated £685 (equivalent to £123,000 in 2008).

During the Second World War, Nieuwenhuys volunteered for the Royal Air Force, receiving Czechoslovakia's Medal of Merit. Many of his teammates, including compatriots Arthur Riley and Dirk Kemp, also enlisted in the British Armed Forces.

He guested for both Arsenal and West Ham United as well as Lovell's Athletic, the works team for Lovell's sweet factory in Newport, Monmouthshire, Wales.

Nieuwenhuys had a passion for sports cars and, prior to enlistment, bought a Jaguar from Carroll Levis for £50. It remained in a journalist's garage for the duration of the war.

Nieuwenhuys returned to the club after the war. His place in the squad became uncertain in the 1946–47 season, which was the first season of competitive football since the league system's suspension. His final season yielded his only honour, the league championship under manager George Kay. He scored five times in 15 appearances. His teammates during this era included Jack Balmer, Bill Jones, Albert Stubbins, Billy Liddell and Bob Paisley. It would be the last of the club's league titles until the 1963–64 season. He retired in 1947, having briefly been installed as assistant professional at West Derby Golf Club. He returned to South Africa, assuming a similar responsibility at the Transvaal Country Club for World Golf Hall of Famer Bobby Locke. Nieuwenhuys continued his association with football through coaching, specifically for Southern Suburbs under manager Bernie Gibson, and the Callies

Nieuwenhuys supplemented his professional career by featuring for the baseball team Hurst Hawks, which included Liverpool colleagues Lance Carr and Ted Savage.

His surname's pronunciation presented a dilemma to many supporters, with even the Daily Express' Arthur Simmons describing it as a "jigsaw". The name is pronounced " Nivvenhows " - from The Football Who's Who 1935.

== Honours ==
Liverpool

- Football League championship: 1946–47
