= Cyril Sidlow =

Welsh footballer

Personal information
- Date of birth: 26 November 1915
- Place of birth: Colwyn Bay, Wales
- Date of death: 12 April 2005 (aged 89)
- Place of death: Codsall, Wolverhampton, UK
- Position: Goalkeeper

Senior career*
Years	Team	Apps	(Gls)
–1937	Llandudno	-	(0)
1937–1946	Wolverhampton Wanderers	-	(0)
1946–1952	Liverpool	165	(0)
1952–1953	New Brighton	-	(0)
1953–1955	Wolverhampton Wanderers	-	(0)
Total			(0)

International career
1946–1949	Wales	7	(0)
- * Club domestic league appearances and goals

Cyril Sidlow (26 November 1915 – 12 April 2005) was a Welsh football goalkeeper. He played for several football clubs, most notably Wolverhampton Wanderers (commonly referred to as Wolves) and Liverpool.

== Life and playing career ==
Sidlow was born in Colwyn Bay, Conwy, North Wales. He played for Llandudno, Colwyn Bay and Wolverhampton Wanderers. Major Frank Buckley signed Sidlow to the Wolves in 1937. Sidlow was the first choice Wolves keeper before World War II, but the signing of Bert Williams after the war limited his chances. His career included a notable international match between England and Wales at Ninian Park where the Wolves supplied both the England keeper (Williams) and Welsh keeper (Sidlow).

Wolves had two international goalkeepers, which led to Sidlow being surplus to requirements. In February 1946, Liverpool manager George Kay signed him for a then-record £4,000. Sidlow made his debut for Liverpool on 31 August 1946 in a league match at Bramall Lane and kept his first clean sheet for the club, with Len Carney scoring a late goal for the Reds in the 90th minute.

At 24, Sidlow's career was curtailed with the beginning of the World War II. He was almost 31 when he re-signed for the Reds. Sidlow, with Charlie Ashcroft and Ray Minshull, were the goalkeepers vying for the number one jersey at Anfield for the 1946/47 season: the first competitive season following the war. Even with the competition, Sidlow was given the position, which he held for 34 of the 42 games in a season that saw Liverpool win their first championship in 24 years. Much of this win is owed to Sidlow as the final game of the season was a must-win for the Reds. Sidlow's former employers, the Wolves, needed just a point to win the title and Liverpool had to face them at Molineux. The Reds were a point back on their hosts and needed a victory to win the league title. After a comprehensive 5–0 win at Anfield, the Wolves were favorites to win the game and take the title. But goals from Jack Balmer and Albert Stubbins — plus Sidlow and the backline keeping Wolves down to one goal — meant the Championship trophy would be heading to Merseyside. His performance in this pivotal game against his former club is often considered the high point of Sidlow's Liverpool career.

Sidlow tasted disappointment with the Reds too when they reached their first Wembley final in 1950. Arsenal, the opposition, took the FA Cup back to Highbury after a 2–0 win. Sidlow's Liverpool days were drawn to a close during the 1950/51 after he originally begun the season as first choice. Charlie Ahcroft and Russell Crossley took over for four games before Sidlow came back in to play his last match for the club. Anfield was the place and Newcastle United were the visitors. Things didn't go well for Sidlow and the Reds as The Magpies went back to St James' Park with the points after a 4–2 win. Crossley came back into the side, and Sidlow retired in the August 1952. Upon retirement from the top level, he went on to play for New Brighton.

Sidlow earned seven caps playing for Wales during his career.

== Memorial ==
Sidlow died at 89 in 2005. After his death, his daughter sponsored a local award in Perton and Codsall, where her father lived until his death, to recognize local players' achievements.

== Honours ==
Liverpool

- Football League First Division: 1946–47
- FA Cup runner-up: 1949–50
