= Tommy McLeod =

Scottish footballer (1920–1999)

Tommy McLeod (26 December 1920 – 16 August 1999) was a Scottish footballer who played as an inside forward.
