= Albert Stubbins =

English footballer (1919–2002)

Personal information
- Date of birth: 17 July 1919
- Place of birth: Wallsend, England
- Date of death: 28 December 2002 (aged 83)
- Place of death: Cullercoats, Tyne and Wear, England
- Height: 5 ft 10 in (1.78 m)
- Position: Centre forward

Youth career
- Whitley & Monkseaton
- Sunderland

Senior career*
Years	Team	Apps	(Gls)
1937–1946	Newcastle United	27	(5)
1946–1953	Liverpool	159	(75)
1953–1954	Ashington		
Total		186	(80)
- * Club domestic league appearances and goals

Albert Stubbins (17 July 1919 – 28 December 2002) was an English footballer who played as a centre forward. Beginning his career at Newcastle United, the onset of World War II limited his playing time.

Spending seven years at Liverpool where he was bought for a club record fee, Stubbins won the League Championship in 1947. There he formed a prolific strike partnership with Jack Balmer, and they were joint-leading goalscorers in the title-winning season with 24 goals each. Stubbins was then the top goalscorer outright in 1948 with 24 goals, and he helped Liverpool reach the 1950 FA Cup Final in which he played at Wembley Stadium.

Immensely popular at Anfield, Stubbins was the recipient of a famous terrace chant from Liverpool supporters. In selecting two players from each decade to enter the Liverpool F.C. Hall of Fame, Stubbins was one of two players chosen from the 1940s. In 2006 he was listed at number 50 in "100 Players Who Shook The Kop".

Stubbins was included on the front cover of the Beatles' 1967 album Sgt. Pepper's Lonely Hearts Club Band, the only footballer to appear.

== Career ==
Born in Wallsend, Tyne and Wear, England, he spent his early years in the United States, returning to Wallsend, where he attended Carville School, in 1929. Stubbins first played for Newcastle United aged 18 in 1937, appearing in official games 30 times and scoring six goals for the team. He then scored 237 goals in 199 games played during the war, and in the 1945–46 transitional season before official League football was restarted, Stubbins scored 39 goals in the Northern League; the second-highest Newcastle scorer was the young outside-right Jackie Milburn with 14 goals, a player who would become an icon at Newcastle, but many fans and journalists believed Stubbins was the better centre-forward.

"Any conversation regarding the greatest strikers to have represented Liverpool should automatically include Albert Stubbins, a popular goalscorer revered by all at Anfield and even the Beatles."

— Official Liverpool F.C. profile of Stubbins.

In 1946 Stubbins was signed by Liverpool for a then club record of £12,500. He had also been approached by Merseyside rivals Everton. Liking the proposal put forward by Liverpool chairman Bill McConnell and manager George Kay, Stubbins said, "we discussed matters and I was impressed with them both, and with the possibilities of Liverpool, so I said I would go to Anfield. I also knew several of the Liverpool players at the time like Willie Fagan and Jack Balmer. That probably gave Liverpool the slight edge and in the end I never spoke to Everton because I had been so impressed with Liverpool's offer."

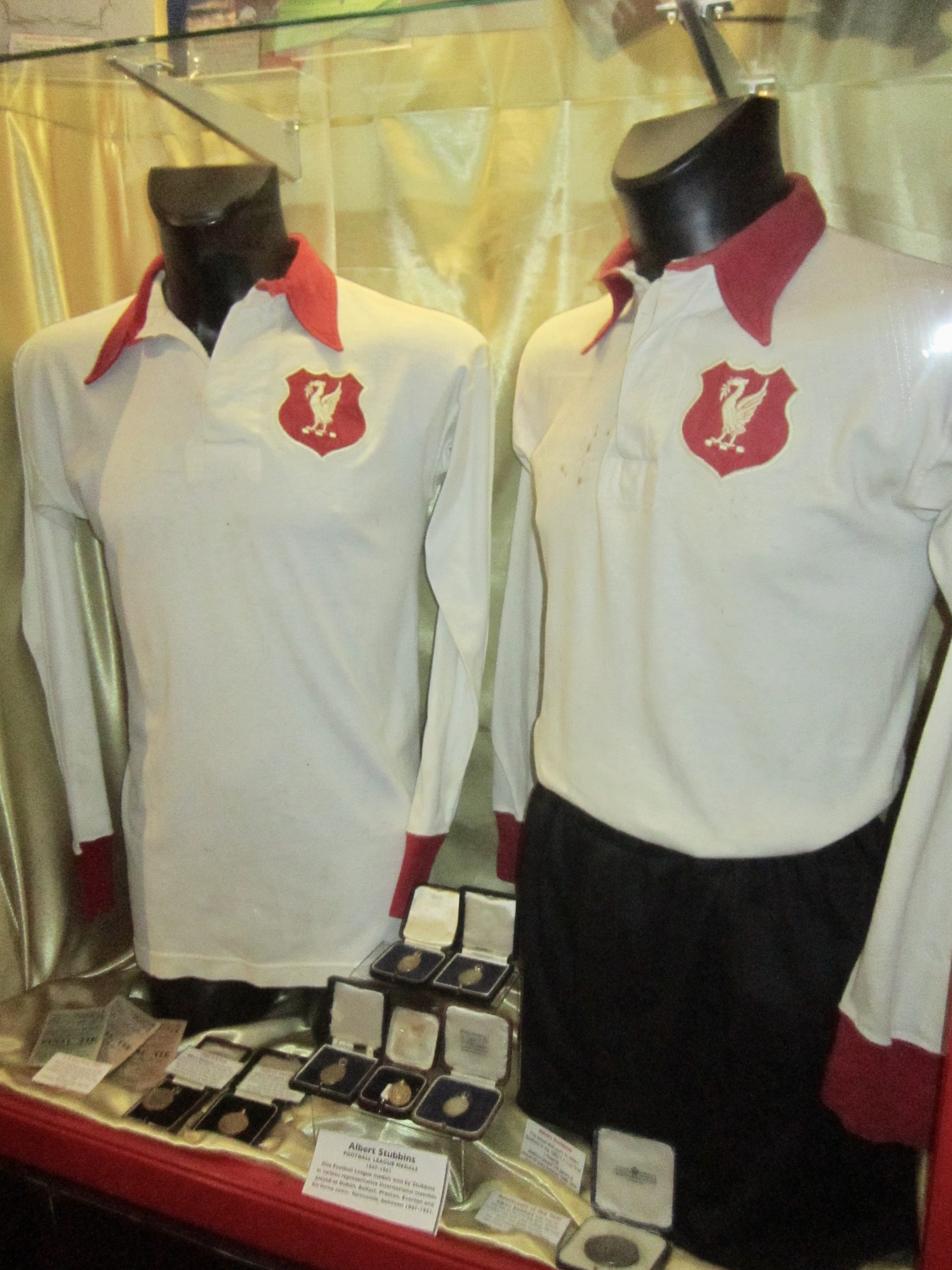
Stubbins' kit (right) from the 1950 FA Cup final in the Liverpool F.C. museum

Making his Liverpool debut on 14 September 1946 in a league match at Burnden Park, Stubbins made an immediate impact when he scored an 82nd-minute goal as the Reds left it late to claim a 3–1 victory over Bolton Wanderers. Playing in a team that included prolific winger Billy Liddell and a future manager of the club, left-half Bob Paisley, Stubbins scored 28 goals (24 league goals) in the 1946–47 season (making him joint top scorer with Jack Balmer) helping Liverpool to win the League Championship, their first since 1923. Stubbins also top scored outright with 24 goals the following season. Although a contractual dispute in the 1948–49 season limited his appearances for the Merseyside club, he then helped Liverpool reach the 1950 FA Cup final, the first time Liverpool had appeared at Wembley with their previous Cup Final appearance in 1914 taking place before Wembley was built. However, they lost to Arsenal by two goals to nil. An immensely popular figure during his seven years at Anfield, Stubbins was the recipient of a famous chant from Liverpool supporters: 'A-L-B-E-R-T, Albert Stubbins is the man for me!'

On 18 October 1950, at Blackpool's Bloomfield Road, Stubbins netted five goals in the Football League's 6–3 victory over the Irish League in an exhibition match. He made his final appearance for Liverpool at Stoke City in January 1953 aged 33 before injuries forced him to retire that year, having scored 83 goals in 178 appearances for the club, or 1 every 2.1 games. Despite his club success, he played for the England only once, in an unofficial international against Wales in 1945, a game England lost 1–0.

== Later life ==
"One of Liverpool's finest players of the immediate post-World War II period, Stubbins' fame also earned him a place on the front cover of the Beatles' ‘Sergeant Pepper’ album – where he was the only footballer to feature."

— FourFourTwo magazine, ranking Stubbins no. 45 in their greatest Liverpool players list and his fame which led to an appearance on the cover of a Beatles album.

Following his retirement, Stubbins briefly coached an American semi-professional side, the New York Americans in 1960. He then returned to his native north-east England where he entered a full-time career in sports journalism.

In 1967 Stubbins appeared on the front cover of The Beatles' Sgt. Pepper's Lonely Hearts Club Band album, the only footballer to be depicted. In selecting two players from each decade to enter the Liverpool F.C. Hall of Fame, Stubbins was one of two players chosen from the 1940s (the other being Billy Liddell). In 2006 he was listed at number 50 in "100 Players Who Shook The Kop", an official Liverpool fan poll. He also has a Liverpool F.C. fan club named in his honour, "The Albert Stubbins Crazy Crew". He also featured as a minor character in Stephen Baxter's 1995 time-travelling novel The Time Ships. He died in 2002, aged 83, after a short illness.

== Career details ==
- Newcastle United (1938–39) – 27 appearances, 5 goals, Football League Second Division
- Wartime guest games (1939–1946) – 188 appearances, 231 goals
- Liverpool FC (1946–1953) – 178 appearances, 83 goals, Football League First Division Championship winners medal (1946–47), FA Cup runners-up medal (1949–50)

== Career statistics ==
Appearances and goals by club, season and competition
Club	Season	League		FA Cup		League Cup		Europe		Others		Total	
Club	Season	App	Goals	App	Goals	App	Goals	App	Goals	App	Goals	App	Goals
Liverpool	1952–53	5	0	0	0	–		–		0	0	5	0
Liverpool	1951–52	12	5	0	0	–		–		0	0	12	5
Liverpool	1950–51	23	6	1	0	–		–		0	0	24	6
Liverpool	1949–50	28	10	7	1	–		–		0	0	35	11
Liverpool	1948–49	15	6	3	1	–		–		0	0	18	7
Liverpool	1947–48	40	24	2	2	–		–		0	0	42	26
Liverpool	1946–47	36	24	6	4	–		–		0	0	42	28
Newcastle United	1946-47	3	1	0	0	–		–		0	0	3	1
Newcastle United	1945-46	0	0	2	1	–		–		0	0	2	1
Newcastle United	1938-39	23	4	1	0	–		–		0	0	24	4
Newcastle United	1937-38	1	0	0	0	–		–		0	0	1	0
Total		186	80	22	9	0	0	0	0	0	0	208	89
