= William Watkinson =

English footballer

Billy Watkinson
Personal information
- Full name: William Wainwright Watkinson
- Date of birth: 16 March 1922
- Place of birth: Prescot, Lancashire, England
- Date of death: February 2001 (aged 78)
- Place of death: Knowsley, Merseyside, England
- Position: Centre forward

Senior career*
Years	Team	Apps	(Gls)
1939–1946	Prescot Cables	N/A	(N/A)
1946–1951	Liverpool	24	(2)
1951–54	Accrington Stanley	105	(45)
1954-56	Halifax Town	60	(24)
1956-58	Prescot Cables	N/A	(N/A)
Total		189	(71)
- * Club domestic league appearances and goals

William Wainwright "Billy" Watkinson (16 March 1922 – February 2001) was an English footballer who played as a half back in the Football League. Playing for Liverpool, he made several appearances during their title-winning 1946/47 season. He also played for Accrington Stanley and Halifax Town A.F.C. He was born in Prescot, Lancashire (now in Merseyside) in 1922, and started his career at local side Prescot Cables F.C.

Beginning at Prescot Cables in 1939, he transferred to Liverpool in February 1946 for free. He made his debut for the club on 11 March against Bolton Wanderers in a 3–1 victory in the Second Round of the Lancashire Cup. In his time at Liverpool, he contributed to the club's win of the English First Division title in the 1946/47 season- the first since the end of the Second World War. In January 1951, he transferred to Accrington Stanley for £3,000- a record fee for the club. He scored 45 goals in 105 League games for Stanley over the course of three years, before transferring to Halifax Town in 1954. At Halifax, he scored 24 goals in 60 appearances, before returning to Prescot Cables in 1956 to play until his retirement in 1958.

He died in February 2001 in Knowsley, Merseyside at the age of 78.
