= Stan Eastham =

Scottish footballer (1913–1997)

Personal information
- Date of birth: 26 November 1913
- Place of birth: Bolton, Greater Manchester, England
- Date of death: 10 April 1997 (aged 83)
- Place of death: Western Australia, Australia
- Position: Midfielder

Senior career*
Years	Team	Apps	(Gls)
?-1936	Army Team		
1936-1945	Liverpool		
1945-1946	Exeter City		
1946	Stockport County		
1946-?	Corinthian Club Brisbane		
- Perth City

International career
1936	England Amateurs	3	(0)
1936	Great Britain Olympic	Called up	
- * Club domestic league appearances and goals

Stanley Eastham (born 26 November 1913 in Bolton, England; died 10 April 1997 in Western Australia, Australia) was an English footballer who played as a forward. He was part of Great Britain Football squad for the 1936 Summer Olympics.

== Career ==
Eastham was a lance corporal in the King's Own Regiment.

In 1936, he won three caps with England Amateurs. That same year, he was part of Great Britain Football squad for the 1936 Summer Olympics but was an unused substitute for Great Britain two games against China and Poland. In late 1936, while still in the military, Eastham signed an amateur contract to play with Liverpool.

In 1937, Eastham toured Australia, New Zealand, and Ceylon with the England Amateur team. After his release from the military later that year, he signed a professional contract with Liverpool, though World War II impacted his gameplay.

Following World War II, Eastham signed to play with Exeter City, then transferred to Stockport County in 1946, where he made his first league appearance. After 14 games, he moved to Australia to play with Corinthian Club in Brisbane, then with the Perth City club.

== Personal life ==
Eastham was born 26 November 1913 in Bolton, England.

He died 10 April 1997 in Western Australia, Australia.
