= John Shafto (footballer) =

English footballer

Personal information
- Date of birth: 8 November 1918
- Place of birth: Humshaugh, England
- Date of death: 1978 (aged 59–60)
- Place of death: England
- Position: Forward

Senior career*
Years	Team	Apps	(Gls)
1937–1939	Liverpool	17	(6)
- * Club domestic league appearances and goals

John Shafto (8 November 1918 – 1978) was an English footballer who played as a striker. Shafto played for Liverpool prior to World War II, making 20 appearances and scoring 7 goals. He also played for Brighton & Hove Albion F.C.
