= Alf Hobson =

English footballer

Alf Hobson (9 September 1913 – 21 February 2004) was an English footballer who played as a goalkeeper for Liverpool in The Football League. Hobson played for a number of clubs before he joined Liverpool, he was their goalkeeper during the 1936–37 season, making 25 appearances, however he only made 1 the following season. The Second World War interrupted his career and he only made 1 appearance following the end of the war
