= Dirk Kemp =

South African soccer player

Dirk Kemp (born 15 October 1913 in Cape Town, South Africa) was a South African footballer who played as a goalkeeper for Liverpool F.C. in The Football League. Kemp started his career in South Africa and played for Arcadia and Transvaal before he moved to England to play for Liverpool. He was at the club at the same time as fellow goalkeeper and countryman Arthur Riley. Kemp struggled to dislodge Riley from the position as he made over 300 appearances for the club. Kemp only appeared 30 times for Liverpool before the Second World War interrupted his career.
