= Harry Kaye =

English footballer

Personal information
- Full name: George Kaye
- Date of birth: 19 April 1919
- Place of birth: Liverpool, England
- Date of death: 1992 (aged 72–73)
- Position: Wing-half

Senior career*
Years	Team	Apps	(Gls)
1946–1947	Liverpool	2	
- → Bradford City (war guest)
1947–1953	Swindon Town	170	(5)
- * Club domestic league appearances and goals

George "Harry" Kaye (19 April 1919 – 1992) was an English footballer who played as a defender. He played for Bradford City as a wartime guest during WW2, before joining Liverpool. He only played a couple of games for Liverpool before moving to Swindon Town.
