= John Easdale (footballer) =

Scottish footballer

Personal information
- Full name: John Hollywood Millar Easdale
- Date of birth: 16 January 1919
- Place of birth: Dumbarton, Scotland
- Date of death: 4 May 1999 (aged 80)
- Place of death: Ontario, Canada
- Position: Centre half

Senior career*
Years	Team	Apps	(Gls)
1937–1948	Liverpool	2	(0)
1942–1943	→ Dumbarton (wartime guest)	x	(x)
	→ Brighton & Hove Albion (wartime guest)	x	(x)
1948–1949	Stockport County	6	(0)
Total		8	(0)
- * Club domestic league appearances and goals

John Hollywood Millar Easdale (16 January 1919 – 4 May 1999) was a Scottish footballer who played as a centre half. Easdale died in Ontario, Canada in May 1999 at the age of 80.
