= Laurie Hughes =

English footballer (1924–2011)

Personal information
- Full name: Laurie Hughes
- Date of birth: 2 March 1924
- Place of birth: Liverpool, England
- Date of death: 9 September 2011 (aged 87)
- Place of death: Liverpool, England
- Position: Centre half

Youth career
- Tranmere Rovers

Senior career*
Years	Team	Apps	(Gls)
1943–1960	Liverpool	303	(1)

International career
1950	England B	1	(0)
1950	England	3	(0)
- * Club domestic league appearances and goals

Laurie Hughes (2 March 1924 – 9 September 2011) was a footballer who played as a centre half for Liverpool. He made three appearances for the England national team.

== Life and playing career ==
Born in 12 Gleave Street, Everton, Liverpool, England, Hughes was a strong, uncompromising centre half, who could also play wing half; he had the knack of being able to read the game-stopping moves before they caused too many problems.

Hughes signed for Liverpool in 1943 from Tranmere where he was a trainee; however, it was not until 5 January 1946 that he made his debut in a 2–0 FA Cup 3rd round 1st leg victory at Sealand Road, Chester, his only goal did not come until 8 December 1951 in a league game at Anfield against Preston, Hughes' 88th-minute strike saving a point in the 2–2 draw.

During the first post-war season of 1946–47 Hughes made 30 appearances from 42 games helping the Reds win the First Division Championship, Liverpool's first title in 24 years.

1950 proved to be a rollercoaster of a season for Hughes, on a high due to reaching the FA Cup final at Wembley only to lose to Arsenal 2–0. He then was selected to represent England at the World Cup in Brazil getting all of his three caps in the process and becoming Liverpool's first representative at the world's premier football tournament, unfortunately, one of the appearances was the 1–0 defeat to the USA. His debut came on 25 June 1950 in Rio de Janeiro, Chile were the opponents who were beaten 2–0 with the goals coming from Stan Mortensen and Wilf Mannion. Hughes was badly injured in the 1950 FA Charity Shield match. He never played for England again and the injury was seen as the beginning of his career's decline. He is still the only English player whose entire representative career consisted of World Cup finals matches.

Hughes and Liverpool's fortunes changed during the fifties when the Reds fell from the top tier, they managed to fend off relegation during the 1952–53 season but could not prevent the drop a season later.

Hughes stayed on at Liverpool and had a decent season in the 1956–57 missing just one match. Hughes played his last game against Charlton on 28 September 1957 aged 33, however, Hughes remained loyal to the club and did not retire for another three years, doing so in May 1960.

During the 1960s Hughes ran a grocery store and in 1964 was convicted of receiving stolen goods and was fined £20 after buying food that was the property of Woolworths.

Hughes died at home on 9 September 2011 aged 87.

== Honours ==
Liverpool

- Football League First Division: 1946–47
- FA Cup runner-up: 1949–50
