= George Paterson (footballer, born 1916) =

Scottish footballer

George Longmore Paterson (19 December 1916 – June 1996) was a Scottish footballer who played as a defender.
