= Harry Eastham =

English footballer

Personal information
- Full name: Henry Eastham
- Date of birth: 30 June 1917
- Place of birth: Blackpool, England
- Date of death: September 1998 (aged 80–81)
- Place of death: Middlesbrough, England
- Position: Inside forward

Youth career
- 1933–1934: Blackpool

Senior career*
| Years | Team | Apps | (Gls) |
| 1934–1936 | Blackpool | 0 | (0) |
| 1936–1948 | Liverpool | 63 | (3) |
| 1948–1953 | Tranmere Rovers | 154 | (13) |
| 1953–1957 | Accrington Stanley | 42 | (3) |
| 1957 | Netherfield | ? | (?) |
| 1957 | Rolls Royce | ? | (?) |
| Total | | 259 | (19) |
- * Club domestic league appearances and goals

Henry Eastham (30 June 1917 – September 1998) was an English professional footballer who played as an inside forward. Active between 1934 and 1954, Eastham made over 250 appearances in the Football League.

== Early life ==
Harry Eastham was born on 30 June 1917 in Blackpool. His elder brother was fellow player George Eastham, Sr.; George's own son – Harry's nephew – George, Jr. was also a professional player.

== Career ==
After graduating through the youth team of hometown club Blackpool, Eastham turned professional in 1934. He also played in the Football League for Liverpool, Tranmere Rovers and Accrington Stanley, before moving to play non-league football with Netherfield and Rolls Royce.
