= Bill Jones (footballer, born 1921) =

English footballer

Personal information
- Full name: William Henry Jones
- Date of birth: 13 May 1921
- Place of birth: Whaley Bridge, Derbyshire, England
- Date of death: 26 December 2010 (aged 89)
- Place of death: Chester, England
- Position: Defender

Youth career
- Hayfield St Matthews

Senior career*
| Years | Team | Apps | (Gls) |
| 1938–1954 | Liverpool | 251 | (17) |

International career
| 1950 | England | 2 | (0) |

Managerial career
- Ellesmere Port
- * Club domestic league appearances and goals

William Henry Jones MM (13 May 1921 – 26 December 2010) was an England international footballer who played for Liverpool.

== Life and playing career ==
Born in Whaley Bridge, Derbyshire, Jones played for Hayfield St Matthews before Liverpool manager George Kay took him, aged seventeen, to Anfield in September 1938.

The Second World War curtailed Jones' early career, although he did appear as a wartime guest for York City, Leeds United and Reading. He served with the South Lancashire Regiment (The Prince of Wales's Volunteers), British Army. In January 1946, Sergeant (acting) William Henry Jones was awarded the Military Medal (MM) "in recognition of gallant and distinguished-services in North West Europe".

He made his debut for Liverpool, along with Len Carney and Cyril Sidlow, as a 25-year-old on the opening day of the 1946–47 season, against Sheffield United at Bramall Lane. The Reds won 1–0 through a goal scored by Carney. Jones opened his goalscoring account with a brace at Anfield on 7 September 1946 in Liverpool's 7–4 defeat of Chelsea.

By the end of the first post-war season, Jones had helped Liverpool to their first Division One championship in 24 years, pipping Manchester United and Wolverhampton Wanderers by a single point. He appeared 26 times during the season, including the title-winning 2–1 victory at Molineux on the final day of the season, and scored six goals.

He was a member of the first Liverpool side to appear at Wembley when he appeared in the 2–0 defeat to Arsenal in the 1950 FA Cup Final.

Jones made his England debut in a 5–3 win over Portugal at Kenilworth Road, Luton on 14 May 1950. He made his only other international appearance against Belgium the same month.

Liverpool were relegated at the end of the 1953–54 season, which was Jones' last for the Reds, for whom he made 277 appearances and scored 17 goals. His last game was a 3–0 defeat to Blackpool on 24 April 1954, at Bloomfield Road.

Jones went on to become player/manager at Ellesmere Port, before returning to Liverpool as a scout during the 1960s. His grandson Rob Jones also appeared for both Liverpool and England.

=== Death ===
On 26 December 2010, Jones died from natural causes at the Countess of Chester Hospital, Chester.

== Honours ==
Liverpool

- Football League First Division: 1946–47
- FA Cup runner-up: 1949–50
