= Barney Ramsden =

English footballer

Personal information
- Full name: Bernard Ramsden
- Date of birth: 8 November 1917
- Place of birth: Sheffield, England
- Date of death: March 1976 (aged 58)
- Place of death: Los Angeles, California, United States
- Position: Full back

Youth career
- Sheffield Victoria

Senior career*
Years	Team	Apps	(Gls)
1937–1948	Liverpool	57	(0)
1948–1950	Sunderland	12	(0)
1950	Hartlepools United	13	(0)
- * Club domestic league appearances and goals

Bernard "Barney" Ramsden (8 November 1917 – March 1976) was an English professional footballer from Sheffield who played as a defender for Liverpool, Sunderland and Hartlepools United. After retiring from playing he became a representative for a ships chandlers firm in San Pedro.
