= Ray Lambert =

Welsh footballer (1922–2009)

Personal information
- Full name: Raymond Lambert
- Date of birth: 18 July 1922
- Place of birth: Bagillt, Flintshire, Wales
- Date of death: 22 October 2009 (aged 87)
- Position: Defender

Youth career
- 1936–1939: Liverpool

Senior career*
Years	Team	Apps	(Gls)
1939–1956	Liverpool	308	(2)

International career
1947–1949	Wales	5	(0)
- * Club domestic league appearances and goals

Raymond Lambert (18 July 1922 – 22 October 2009) was a Welsh footballer who played for Liverpool.

== Life and playing career ==
Born in Bagillt, Flintshire, Wales, Lambert joined the Reds as an amateur schoolboy in 1936 aged 13. In doing so, he set the record for being the youngest ever player to join a league side. He impressed Liverpool manager George Kay so much that he had Lambert sign professional forms on his 17th birthday in 1939. This was just a month before the F.A brought a premature halt to the league season because of the outbreak of the Second World War.

Upon the conclusion of the war Lambert, now 23, returned to Merseyside but had to wait to make his debut, which came on 5 January 1946 in the first official competition after World War II—the FA Cup. Liverpool made the journey to Sealand Road to face Chester City in the 3rd round 1st leg, a game that the Reds won 2–0. Also making their debuts that day were Liverpool greats Billy Liddell and Bob Paisley.

The full-back's first goal for the Reds came via a 77th-minute penalty on 8 October 1949 at Anfield in a league game against Middlesbrough. This also finished 2–0 to the Reds.

Lambert fitted straight into the Liverpool line-up and held on to his place, which might be either left or right back as he was comfortable in each. He averaged 30 games a season for the following decade and become a favourite with the Anfield masses. He appeared in 36 of the 42 league games as Liverpool went on to clinch the first post-war championship by one point over Wolves and bitter rivals Manchester United.

Lambert was also an integral member of the Reds squad that took Liverpool to their first ever Wembley final in 1950, Arsenal were the opponents on 29 April and spoilt the Merseysiders day by taking the cup back to Highbury after a 2–0 win. Liverpool's and Lambert's luck took a sharp turn for the worse as the Reds struggled with their league form and were finally relegated at the end of the 1953/54 season.

Ray Lambert won 5 caps for Wales, his first coming on 19 October 1946 in a British Home Championship against Scotland at the Racecourse Ground Wrexham, it was a day to remember for Lambert as the Welsh ran out 3–1 victors with all the goals coming in the 2nd half.

Upon retiring, Ray ran a newsagents in Garden City in Deeside. His son, Wayne, had trials with Manchester City

Ray finally called an end to his Anfield days just before his 34th birthday in 1956 after playing 341 appearances.

Ray is the great-uncle of the music composer Daniel Liam Glyn.

He died on the 22 October 2009, at the age of 87.

== Honours ==
Liverpool

- Football League First Division: 1946–47
- FA Cup runner-up: 1949–50

== See also ==
- One-club man
