= Phil Taylor (footballer, born 1917) =

English footballer and manager (1917-2012)

Personal information
- Full name: Philip Henry Taylor
- Date of birth: 18 September 1917
- Place of birth: Bristol, England
- Date of death: 1 December 2012 (aged 95)
- Height: 5 ft 9 3/4 in (1.77 m)
- Position: Wing-half

Senior career*
Years	Team	Apps	(Gls)
1935–1936	Bristol Rovers	21	(2)
1936–1954	Liverpool	312	(32)
Total		333	(34)

International career
1947	England	3	(0)

Managerial career
- 1956–1959: Liverpool
- * Club domestic league appearances and goals

Philip Henry Taylor (18 September 1917 – 1 December 2012) was an English footballer who played for and managed Liverpool.

== Player ==
Taylor played for his hometown club Bristol Rovers as an apprentice (in 21 league matches, scoring twice) before he was signed by Liverpool manager George Patterson for £5000 plus Ted Hartill in March 1936, he made his debut on the 28th of the same month in a league game at the Baseball Ground, Liverpool shared the points with Derby County in a 2–2 draw with Taylor scoring a late equaliser, his first goal for the club.

Taylor joined Liverpool as a young inside-forward with a lot of potential, but was reverted by George Kay to wing-half in which position he developed into a stylish, composed defender.

Taylor was a member of Liverpool's 1946–47 Championship-winning team, making 35 league appearances, scoring once. He represented England three times, making his debut on 18 October 1947 in a British Home Championship match at Ninian Park, Cardiff. England legends Tom Finney, Stan Mortensen and Tommy Lawton made it a memorable day for Taylor, scoring the goals in a 3–0 win.

Taylor was handed the captaincy during the 1949/50 season and led the side to the FA Cup final on 29 April 1950; he appeared seven times in the club's Cup run. Arsenal spoilt the day for the Reds by beating them 2–0.

Overall Taylor played 345 games for Liverpool, scoring 34 goals (which included 312 league appearances and 32 league goals).

Taylor was also a first-class cricketer, and played a single game for the Gloucestershire first team in 1938, as well as three games for their second eleven.

== Manager ==
Upon his retirement in 1954 he joined the backroom staff as a coach. He became manager of Liverpool in 1956 when former manager Don Welsh was sacked after failing to gain promotion back to the 1st Division.

Taylor took over the reins with a determination to put Liverpool back where they belonged, immediately signing Alan A'Court, Tommy Younger, and club legend Ronnie Moran who ended up spending five decades at Anfield.

Taylor, however, failed to achieve what he set out to do, and after an unsteady start to the 1959/60 campaign he resigned, stating "The strain of trying to win promotion has proved too much." A very sad Taylor spoke to the Liverpool Echo newspaper about the difficult decision to resign as Liverpool manager, saying: "No matter how great has been the disappointment of the Directors at our failure to win our way back to the First Division, it has not been greater than mine. I made it my goal. I set my heart on it and strove for it with all the energy I could muster. Such striving has not been enough and now the time has come to hand over to someone else to see if they can do better."

He was succeeded by Bill Shankly. Taylor's legacy to Liverpool was the back room team he assembled of Reuben Bennett, Joe Fagan and Bob Paisley. All three were retained by Shankly, who together with them built a hugely successful club. Promotion was achieved in 1962, and by the time Shankly retired in 1974, Liverpool had won three league titles, two FA Cups and one UEFA Cup. Even more success, including six league titles and three European Cup triumphs, followed during Paisley's nine years as manager, while Fagan won three major trophies during the first of his two seasons as manager.

Of the players who were signed or given debuts by Taylor, several went on to play a part in Liverpool's success under Shankly. They included striker Roger Hunt, given his debut by Taylor in 1958, who spent 11 years at Anfield and scored 286 goals, and was also a member of England's World Cup-winning side in 1966.

== Retirement and death ==
Taylor lived to the age of 95, and was believed to be the oldest living England international footballer at the time of his death, one of the last surviving players to have played before the Second World War. He died on 1 December 2012.

== Career details ==
=== As a player ===
- Liverpool F.C. (1936–1954) – Football League First Division Championship winners medal (1947), FA Cup runners-up medal (1950)
- England (1947) – 3 caps

== Honours ==
Liverpool

- FA Cup runner-up: 1949–50
