= Willie Fagan =

Scottish footballer

Personal information
- Full name: William Fagan
- Date of birth: 20 February 1917
- Place of birth: Musselburgh, Scotland
- Date of death: 29 February 1992 (aged 75)
- Place of death: Wellingborough, England
- Position: Forward

Youth career
- 1934: Wellesley Juniors

Senior career*
Years	Team	Apps	(Gls)
1934–1936	Celtic	12	(9)
1936–1937	Preston North End	35	(6)
1937–1952	Liverpool	158	(47)
1952	Distillery		
1952–1955	Weymouth		
Total		205	(62)

International career
1945	Scotland (wartime)	1	(0)

Managerial career
- 1952–1955: Weymouth
- * Club domestic league appearances and goals

William Fagan (20 February 1917 – 29 February 1992) was a Scottish footballer, who played for Celtic, Preston North End and Liverpool.

== Football career ==
=== Celtic ===
Fagan started his professional career as a teenager at Celtic, joining the club from Wellesley Juniors, the same route taken by his uncle John McFarlane 16 years earlier. He made his debut aged barely 18 in March 1935, and appeared five times for the Hoops as they won the 1935–36 Scottish Division One title; however, it was his six goals in as many matches at the start of the 1936–37 season which drew attention from other clubs.

=== Preston North End ===
He moved on to Preston North End where he would link up with several other Scottish players, including former Celtic players Hugh O'Donnell and Frank O'Donnell, and future managerial great Bill Shankly. They reached the FA Cup final of 1937 but lost the game 3–1 to Sunderland.

=== Liverpool ===
Liverpool manager George Kay then took Fagan to Liverpool where he made his debut, along with John Shafto, on 23 October 1937 in a 1–1 league draw with Leicester at Anfield. He scored his first Liverpool goal a week later on 30 October in a 3–2 league win over Sunderland at Roker Park.

While playing for the Reds, Fagan went straight into the line-up in his favoured inside-left position, although he did appear as a centre-forward; he ended his initial season at the club with nine goals in 36 matches. He followed this up by scoring 15 times, one behind top scorer Berry Nieuwenhuys (who later invited Fagan to be best man at his wedding) and missing only just three matches of the 1938–39 campaign.

The Second World War interrupted Fagan's career for six years and it took away the majority of his best years. He played as a wartime guest for Celtic, Aldershot, Leicester, Northampton, Newcastle, Chelsea, Millwall and Reading.

Fagan returned to Merseyside upon the conclusion of the war and was appointed captain. He played 22 (18 league) matches, scoring seven goals (all in the league) as Liverpool won the first post-war First Division championship by the end of the 1946–47 season.

Injuries caused his appearances during the 1947–48 and 1948–49 seasons to be very irregular, and he also lost the captaincy and appeare dto be on the verge of departing. He bounced back in the 1949–50 season as he helped the Reds to their very first Wembley cup final on 29 April 1950. Fagan made 42 appearances in that campaign, seven in the FA Cup, scoring 11 goals, four of them in the cup run. Arsenal won the final 2–0 in front of a 100,000 crowd, the second time he had been on the losing side in a cup final.

Fagan made just four appearances during the following campaign and three during the first half of the 1951–52 season. He was allowed to leave Liverpool in January 1952.

=== Later football career ===
Fagan joined Northern Irish club Distillery where he played for a short time. He then headed back to England where in took on a player/manager role at Weymouth.

=== International ===
He gained his only international recognition during World War Two when he appeared for Scotland in 1945; however these are regarded as 'unofficial' internationals.

== After playing ==
After hanging up his boots, Willie became a Borstal officer, an occupation he held until his retirement in 1982.

Willie died in February 1992 in Wellingborough. He was 75 years old.

== Honours ==
Preston North End

- FA Cup runner-up: 1936–37

Liverpool

- Football League First Division: 1946–47
- FA Cup runner-up: 1949–50
