= Jack Balmer =

English footballer (1916–1984)

Personal information
- Full name: John Balmer
- Date of birth: 6 February 1916
- Place of birth: West Derby, England
- Date of death: 25 December 1984 (aged 68)
- Place of death: Liverpool, England
- Position: Striker

Senior career*
Years	Team	Apps	(Gls)
1935–1952	Liverpool	289	(98)
- * Club domestic league appearances and goals

John Balmer (6 February 1916 — 25 December 1984) was an English footballer who played as a striker for Liverpool.

== Life and playing career ==
Born in West Derby, Liverpool, Lancashire, Balmer came from a family of footballers: Billy and Bob both played for Everton during the early part of the 20th century, whilst uncle Jack was an amateur at Goodison Park.

Balmer played for Collegiate Old Boys and Everton, where he was an amateur, before he made the short journey across Stanley Park and was signed by Liverpool manager George Patterson, who gave him his first professional contract on 23 August 1935. The 19-year-old made his debut on 21 September 1935 at Elland Road against Leeds United in a Football League First Division match, however, it wasn't a success as Liverpool lost 1–0. His first goal came on 7 December the same year in a league game at Anfield, the 81st-minute strike turned out to be the winner in a 2–1 victory over Preston North End. Balmer flitted in and out of the starting line-up during his first season, fighting for the number 9 shirt with Fred Howe. He gained experience playing in an inside forward position as well as his more accustomed centre-forward role.

The Second World War curtailed Balmer's footballing career. Upon resumption of the national competitions, Balmer formed a partnership with Albert Stubbins; they both finished the first post-war season (1946–47) with 24 goals, helping to guide Liverpool to their first championship in 24 years.

During the title season, Balmer created a League record by scoring a hat-trick of hat-tricks (no other player scored even two successive hat-tricks for the club until Fernando Torres did so in 2008). The first came on 9 November 1946 in a 3–0 home win against Portsmouth, with the goals coming in the 30th (penalty), 70th and 79th minutes, he followed this up a week later with a four-goal haul away at the Baseball Ground in a 4–1 win over Derby County (this included a six-minute hat-trick in the 43rd, 46th and 49th minutes, with the fourth coming on the hour mark). The record-breaker came on 23 November at home to Arsenal in the 15th, 61st and 68th minutes of a 4–2 triumph (Stubbins scored the other in the 78th minute, bringing to an end a run of ten consecutive goals by Balmer). He followed this feat up with five more goals in his next four games, making a total of 15 in seven outings, a strike rate of more than two per game.

Balmer was given the captaincy in the 1947–48 season and continued prolifically along with Stubbins. He played 313 official games, scoring 111 goals between 1935 and his retirement in 1952 (averaging a goal every 2.8 appearances).

It was during the war that he gained his only international recognition, playing for England in a wartime match against Wales at the Racecourse Ground in Wrexham in front of a crowd of 17,000 on 18 November 1939. England won 3–2, with Balmer scoring one of the goals.

Balmer died on Christmas Day 1984 at the age of 68.

== Career details ==
- Liverpool F.C (1935–1952) – 312 appearances, 111 goals – Football League First Division (level 1) championship winners medal (1947)
