= Matt Busby =

Scottish footballer, manager (1909–1994)

Sir Matt Busby CBE
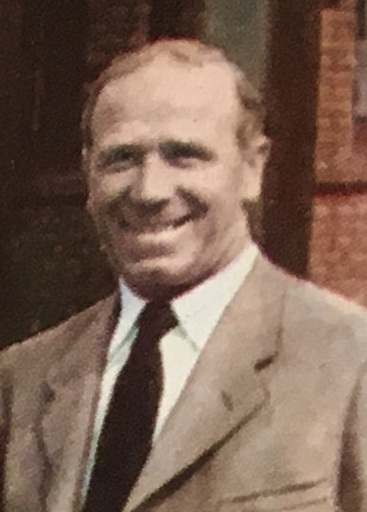
- Busby in 1957

Personal information
- Full name: Alexander Matthew Busby
- Date of birth: 26 May 1909
- Place of birth: Orbiston, Bellshill, Scotland
- Date of death: 20 January 1994 (aged 84)
- Place of death: Cheadle, Greater Manchester, England
- Height: 1.78 m (5 ft 10 in)
- Positions: Right half; inside forward

Senior career*
Years	Team	Apps	(Gls)
1928	Denny Hibs		
1928–1936	Manchester City	204	(11)
1936–1945	Liverpool	115	(3)
Total		319	(14)

International career
1933	Scotland	1	(0)
1941	Scottish League XI	1	(0)
1942–1945	Scotland (wartime)	7	(0)

Managerial career
- 1945–1969: Manchester United
- 1948: Great Britain
- 1958: Scotland
- 1970–1971: Manchester United
- * Club domestic league appearances and goals

Sir Alexander Matthew Busby (26 May 1909 – 20 January 1994) was a Scottish football player and manager, who managed Manchester United between 1945 and 1969 and again for the second half of the 1970–71 season. He was the first manager of an English team to win the European Cup and is widely regarded as one of the greatest managers of all time.

Before going into management, Busby was a player for two of Manchester United's greatest rivals, Manchester City and Liverpool. During his time at City, Busby played in two FA Cup Finals, winning one of them. After his playing career was interrupted by the Second World War, Busby was offered the job of assistant coach at Liverpool, but they were unwilling to give him the control that he wanted over the first team. As a result, he took the vacant manager's job at Manchester United instead, where he built the famous Busby Babes team that won successive Football League First Division titles and challenged for the European Cup. Eight of these players died in the Munich air disaster, but Busby rebuilt the team and won two more First Division titles as well as other domestic cups before he took United to European Cup glory a decade later.

In his 25 years with Manchester United, Busby won five league championships, two FA Cups and the European Cup. He was among the inaugural inductees into the English Football Hall of Fame in 2002, and the Scottish Football Hall of Fame in 2004.

== Early life ==
Busby was born to Alexander and Helen "Nellie" (née Greer) Busby in a two-roomed pitman's cottage in the mining village of Orbiston, Bellshill, Lanarkshire. When he was born, Busby's mother was told by the doctor, "A footballer has come into this house today". Busby's father, Alexander, was a miner called up to serve in the First World War and was killed by a sniper's bullet on 23 April 1917 at the Battle of Arras. His great-great-grandfather, George Busby, emigrated to Scotland from Ireland during the Great Famine, while his mother's side of the family emigrated to Scotland from Ireland later on in the 19th century. Three of his uncles were killed in France with the Cameron Highlanders. Busby's mother was left to raise Matt and his three sisters alone until her marriage to a man called Harry Matthie in 1919.

Busby was raised a Catholic and remained a devout believer. In 1972, Pope Paul VI made him a Knight of Order of Saint Gregory the Great. He had been appointed Knight Bachelor four years earlier.

Busby would often accompany his father down into the coal pits, but his true aspiration was to become a professional footballer. In his 1973 autobiography, Busby described himself as being as football mad as any other boy in Bellshill citing in particular the impression made on him by Alex James and Hughie Gallacher.

His mother might have quashed those dreams when she applied to emigrate with Matt to the United States in the late 1920s, but he was granted a reprieve by the nine-month processing time. In the meantime, Busby got a full-time job as a collier and played football part-time for Stirlingshire Junior side Denny Hibs. He had played only a few matches for Denny Hibs, but it was not long before he was signed up by a Manchester City side that was a couple of games away from regaining promotion to the First Division. Ten minutes after he had signed for Man City a representative of his boyhood club, Glasgow Celtic, phoned to express their desire to sign him. Busby’s half-brother later recounted Matt cried when he missed the opportunity to play for the club he supported.

== Playing career ==
=== Club career ===
Aged 18, Busby signed for Manchester City on a one-year contract worth £5 per week on 11 February 1928, with the provision for him to leave at the end of the deal if he still wished to emigrate to the US with his mother. He decided to stay and made his debut for City on 2 November 1929, more than 18 months after first signing for the Blues, when he played at inside left in a 3–1 win at home to Middlesbrough in the First Division. He made 11 more appearances for City that season, all at inside forward, scoring five goals in the process.

During the 1930–31 season, City manager Peter Hodge decided that Busby's talents could be better exploited from the half-back line, with Busby playing the right-half role. In his new position, Busby built up a reputation as an intelligent player and a finer passer of the ball. In 1930, Manchester United made an enquiry about signing Busby from their cross-town rivals, but they were unable to afford the £150 fee that City demanded. By the 1931–32 season, Busby was firmly established in the first team, missing just one match that season. Indeed, Busby and Jackie Bray became such fixtures at wing-half that club captain Jimmy McMullan had to move to forward to keep his place in the team. In the 1930s Manchester City performed strongly in the FA Cup. They reached the semi-finals in 1932, and the final in 1933 before finally winning the tournament in 1934. However, from the second half of the 1934–35 season, Busby's number 4 jersey was worn by Jack Percival with increasing regularity, and Busby was sold to Liverpool for £8,000 on 12 March 1936, having made more than 200 appearances for Manchester City.

He made his debut for the Reds just two days later, on 14 March, away to Huddersfield Town; the match ended in a 1–0 Liverpool defeat. Busby opened his goalscoring account a month later – his 47th-minute strike helped his team to a 2–2 draw with Blackburn Rovers at Ewood Park. Busby soon made the number 4 shirt his own, ousting Ted Savage in the process. He rarely missed a game over the following three seasons. This consistency earned Busby the Liverpool captaincy and he led the club with great distinction. Along with Jimmy McDougall and Tom Bradshaw, Busby made up what is considered by many to be the best half-back line Liverpool had ever had.

Bob Paisley joined Liverpool from Bishop Auckland in 1939, and it was Busby who took him under his wing and showed him the ropes at Anfield. This led to a lifelong friendship between two of the most successful managers in English football history. The Second World War arrived soon after, and with it came an end to Busby's playing days. Like many of the Liverpool playing staff, he signed on for national service in the King's Liverpool Regiment.

=== War years ===
Busby carried on playing football during the war. A few days after helping Aldershot defeat Chelsea 4–3 in a benefit match, Busby signed for Chelsea on 28 October 1939. He made four appearances in total. He also turned out for Middlesbrough (13 matches), Reading, Brentford, and Bournemouth & Boscombe Athletic.

Hibernian lured Busby back north in 1941 at a time when English clubs did not want their players in Scottish football unless they were insured. He played in 37 matches for the club and scored five goals (including one against city rivals Hearts). Busby appeared in back-to-back Summer Cup finals against Rangers with a 3–2 victory in the 1941 competition.

After returning to Liverpool, he was appointed assistant coach of the club in May 1944. While based in Catterick, he also starred for Portrack Shamrocks in the 1945 Ellis Cup final as a war-time guest.

=== International career ===
Busby made only one official international appearance for Scotland; he played in a 3–2 British Home Championship defeat to Wales at Ninian Park, Cardiff, on 4 October 1933. Playing opposite Busby in the Welsh half-back line was his future assistant Jimmy Murphy. Busby also made seven appearances for Scotland against England during the Second World War, winning just one of them, but these are considered unofficial. He represented the Scottish League XI in an inter-league match in 1941, while he was a guest player of Hibernian.

== Managerial career ==
=== Arrival and early days at Manchester United ===
During the Second World War, Busby served as a football coach in the Army Physical Training Corps, and the experience resulted in Liverpool offering him the job of assistant to their then-manager George Kay. However, the experience had also forged Busby's opinions about how football should be played and governed, and when it became clear that they differed from those of the Liverpool board, their chairman Billy McConnell allowed Busby to pursue alternative employment.

After Manchester United had tried to sign Busby from Manchester City in 1930, he became good friends with United's fixer, Louis Rocca; their relationship was helped by the fact that both were members of the Manchester Catholic Sportsman's Club. United were in desperate need of a manager to take over from club secretary Walter Crickmer after the war and a board meeting was called in December 1944 so as to ascertain who that new manager might be. Knowing that Liverpool had already offered Busby a job, Rocca convinced the United board to "leave it to [him]" and immediately wrote a letter to Busby, addressed to his army regiment. The letter was vague, referring only to "a job", just in case it fell into the wrong hands, namely the Liverpool officials.

In February 1945, still in uniform, Busby turned up at Cornbrook Cold Storage, one of the United chairman James W. Gibson's businesses at Trafford Park to discuss the contents of Rocca's letter with the chairman. Busby requested that he be directly involved in training, pick the team on matchdays and even choose the players to be bought and sold without interference from the club directors, who, he believed, did not know the game as well as he did. Such a level of control over the team was unprecedented in the English game, but the United chairman was in no position to argue. Busby was originally offered a three-year contract but managed to secure himself a five-year deal after explaining that it would take at least that long for his revolution to have a tangible effect.

The contract was signed that day – 19 February 1945 – but it was not until 1 October that Busby officially took over the reins at Manchester United. In the interim, he returned to the Army Physical Training Corps, whose football team he took to Bari, Italy, in the spring of 1945. There, he took in a training session for a football team made up of non-commissioned officers led by West Bromwich Albion's former half-back Jimmy Murphy. Impressed by the Welshman's oratory skills, Busby engaged him in conversation and offered him the job of chief coach at Manchester United, which Murphy accepted verbally there and then, before joining the club officially in early 1946. The two men immediately put their mark on the side, leading them to the runners-up spot in the league, behind Busby's former employers Liverpool, by the end of the 1946–47 season. Manchester United were runners-up in the league in 1947, 1948, 1949 and 1951, and won the FA Cup in 1948, before winning the league championship in 1952. This was a welcome success for a club which had last won a major trophy in 1911 and had spent the interwar years bouncing between the First and Second Divisions.

By 1952, however, the side captained by Johnny Carey, was beginning to show its age, and a new set of players had to be found. Busby, who had achieved a great deal of success in spite of his lack of previous managerial experience, was expected to spend large sums of money on high-profile players. Instead, he gradually replaced the older players with players as young as 16 and 17. These included right-back Bill Foulkes, centre-halves Mark Jones and Jackie Blanchflower, wingers Albert Scanlon and David Pegg and forward Billy Whelan. Among them was Duncan Edwards, judged by many to be England's finest player of his era, and capped by England at 17 – setting a record for the youngest-ever full international that remained unbroken for more than 40 years. He made relatively few signings from other clubs between 1951 and 1957, rare examples being winger Johnny Berry, forward Tommy Taylor and goalkeeper Harry Gregg.

Busby managed the Great Britain team at the 1948 Summer Olympics. The team reached the semi-finals, but lost 3–1 to the eventual runners-up, Yugoslavia.

In 1956, just after United won another league title, Busby was offered the Real Madrid managerial role. The Real Madrid president at the time, Santiago Bernabéu Yeste, told him that the role was "like managing paradise". Busby responded by declining the job and adding "Manchester is my heaven".

=== The Busby Babes and the Munich tragedy ===
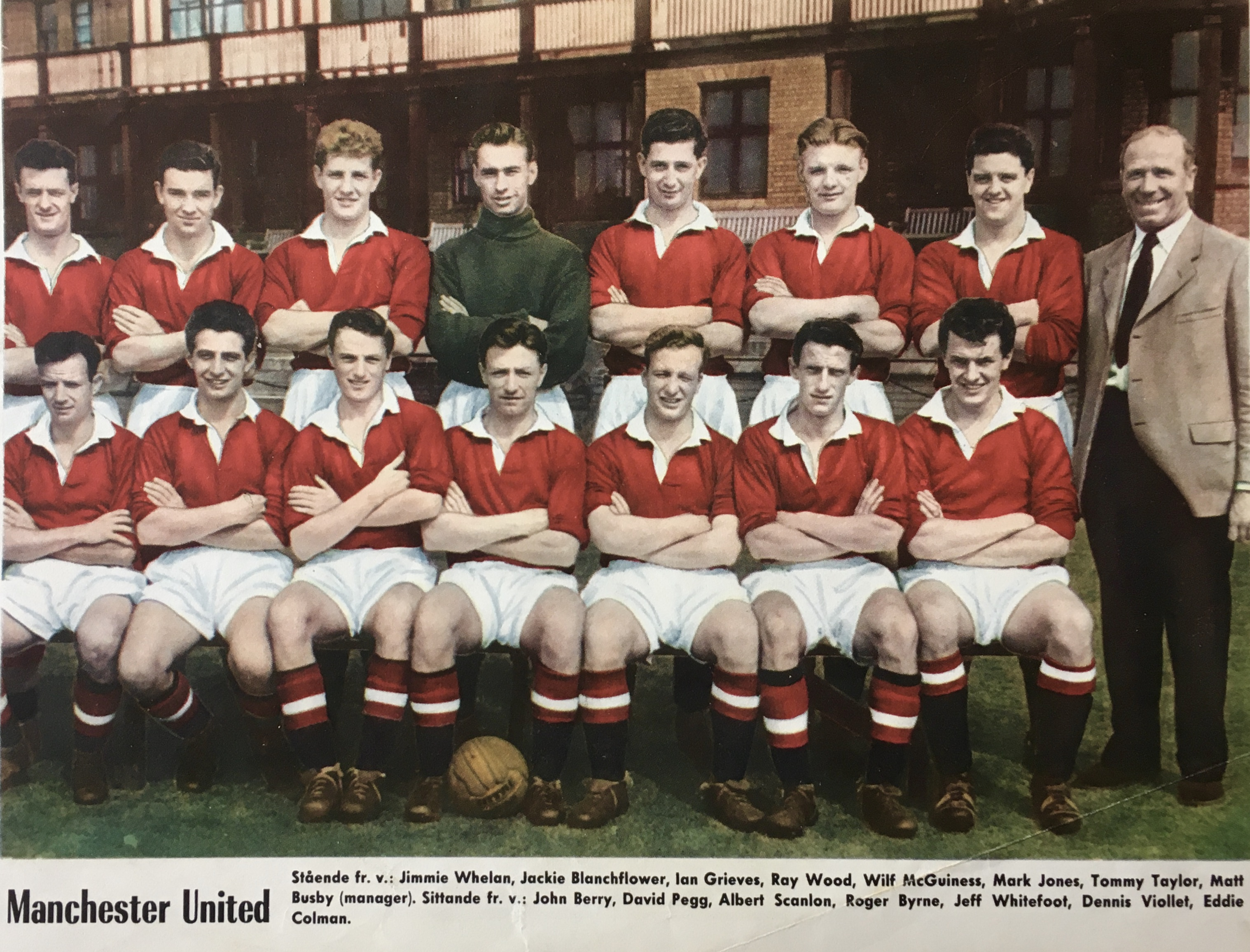
Busby (back row, far right) in a Manchester United team photo in 1957

During this period, the team picked up the affectionate nickname the Busby Babes, because of the youthfulness of many of the players he fielded. They won the league in both 1956 and 1957, and were runners-up to Aston Villa in the 1957 FA Cup Final. The young side was so successful that centre-forward Tommy Taylor and goalkeeper Harry Gregg were United's only major signings over a spell of almost five years.

Busby and his team began the 1957–58 season ready for a second bid to win the treble of the Football League title, FA Cup and European Cup. On the way home from a European Cup tie against Red Star Belgrade on 6 February 1958, their plane crashed on the runway at Munich-Riem Airport. Seven United players and three club officials were among the 21 people who died at the scene, while Duncan Edwards died from his injuries two weeks later as the final death toll reached 23; two other players (Johnny Berry and Jackie Blanchflower) were injured to such an extent that they never played football again. Busby's old friend from Manchester City, the goalkeeper Frank Swift, who had travelled to Munich in his post-playing career as a journalist, also died. Busby suffered multiple injuries and twice received the last rites, but he recovered from his injuries and left the hospital after nine weeks.

He was not aware of the extent of the Munich tragedy until some three weeks after the crash, as doctors felt he was not strong enough to know the truth until then. Towards the end of February 1958, he asked a Franciscan friar at the hospital how Duncan Edwards was faring; the friar was unaware that the news of Edwards's death had been kept from him and felt that it was his duty to inform Busby that Edwards was dead. His wife Jean then had to tell him of all the other players and officials who had lost their lives.

He reportedly told his wife that he felt like quitting the manager's job, as he had feelings of guilt over the disaster. Busby had gone against the wishes of Football League officials by pressing for Manchester United's participation in the European Cup and had not felt able to challenge the aircraft's pilot about taking off in heavy snow. Jean urged him to carry on with his duties in honour of the players who had died. In March 1958, Busby also had to face the torment of player Johnny Berry – who suffered career-ending injuries in the crash – complaining that Tommy Taylor was a poor friend for not visiting him in hospital, unaware that Taylor had been killed; Busby had been urged to keep the news from Berry at this stage, which he found particularly difficult.

In the meantime, the team was managed by Jimmy Murphy, who had been taking charge of the Wales team at the time of the crash, and so was not present. Busby attended a new-look United side's FA Cup final defeat against Bolton Wanderers at Wembley three months later, and resumed full managerial duties for the following season.

Busby had been appointed the manager of Scotland before the Munich disaster. Dawson Walker took charge of the team during the 1958 World Cup instead. After recovering from his injuries, Busby managed Scotland in two games later that year against Wales and Northern Ireland. Busby gave an 18-year-old Denis Law, then with Huddersfield Town, his first Scotland cap. He had already expressed an interest in signing Law for United by this stage, although he had yet to be successful in doing so.

=== The post-Munich side ===
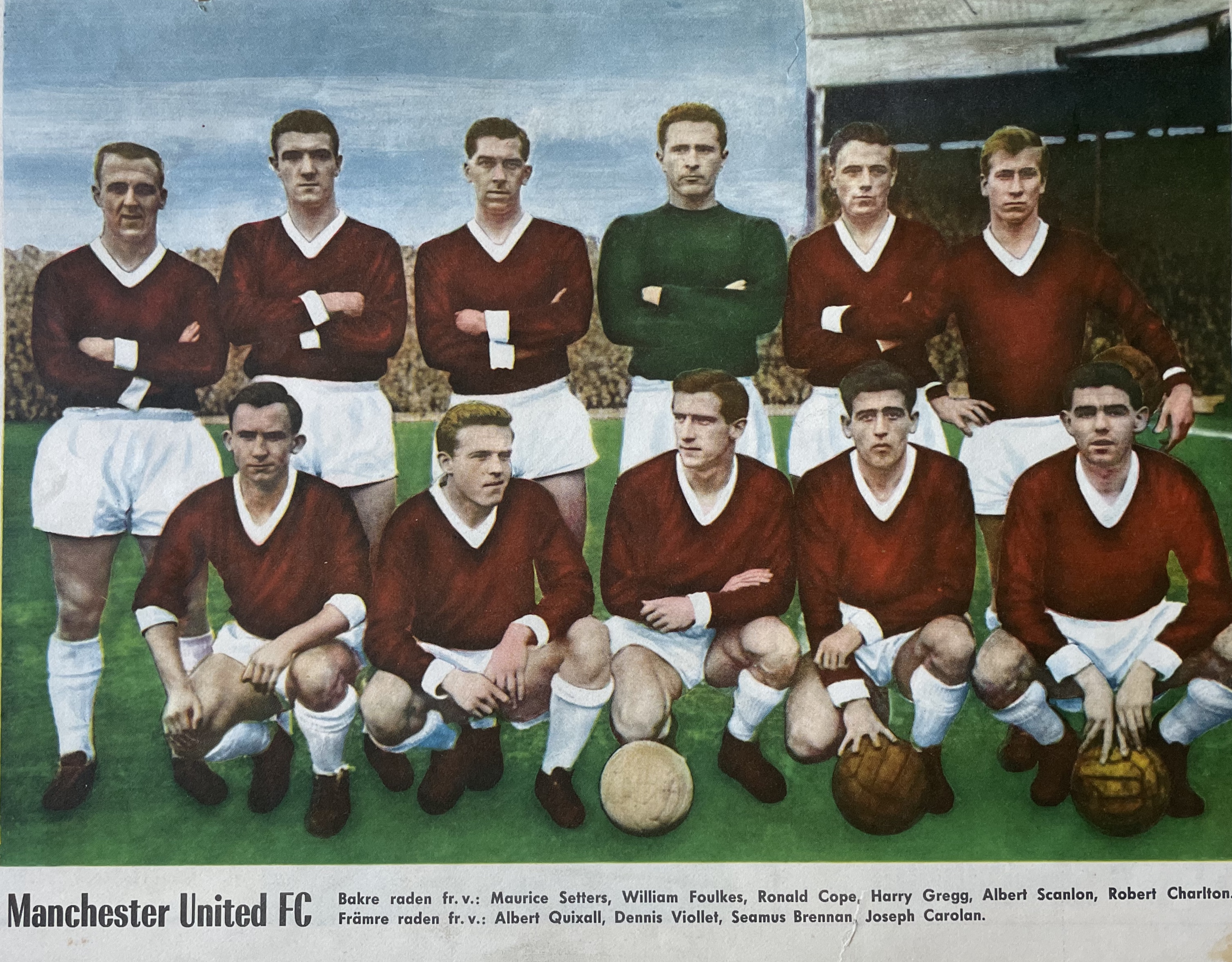
Manchester United F.C. in 1960 – from the left, standing: Maurice Setters, Bill Foulkes, Ronnie Cope, Harry Gregg, Albert Scanlon, Bobby Charlton. Front row: Warren Bradley, Albert Quixall, Dennis Viollet, Shay Brennan and Joe Carolan.

After the crash, Busby built a new side around Munich survivors including Harry Gregg, Bobby Charlton and Bill Foulkes. A number of surviving players including Albert Scanlon, Kenny Morgans and Dennis Viollet resumed their careers but moved on to other clubs in the four years following the disaster.

As well as promoting reserve and youth players including Shay Brennan and Johnny Giles to the first team, Busby also delved into the transfer market to sign players including David Herd, Albert Quixall and Denis Law. Northern Irish teenager George Best was scouted for Manchester United by Bob Bishop and signed to the club's playing staff by chief scout Joe Armstrong, making his first team debut in September 1963.

Busby successfully rebuilt United, as he guided them to a 3–1 victory over Leicester City in the 1963 FA Cup Final. They were league champions in 1965 and again in 1967, with a defeat on the final day of the 1967–68 season seeing rivals Manchester City snatch the title away.

During the 1966 World Cup, Busby compiled a scouting report on the Portugal side for England manager Alf Ramsey. Busby added a note saying: "Dear Alf... first of all congrats – keep it up. I know you have knowledge of Portugal but have included a report which may help. Wembley final the next stop is the wish of Yours Truly, Matt."

=== European glory and retirement ===
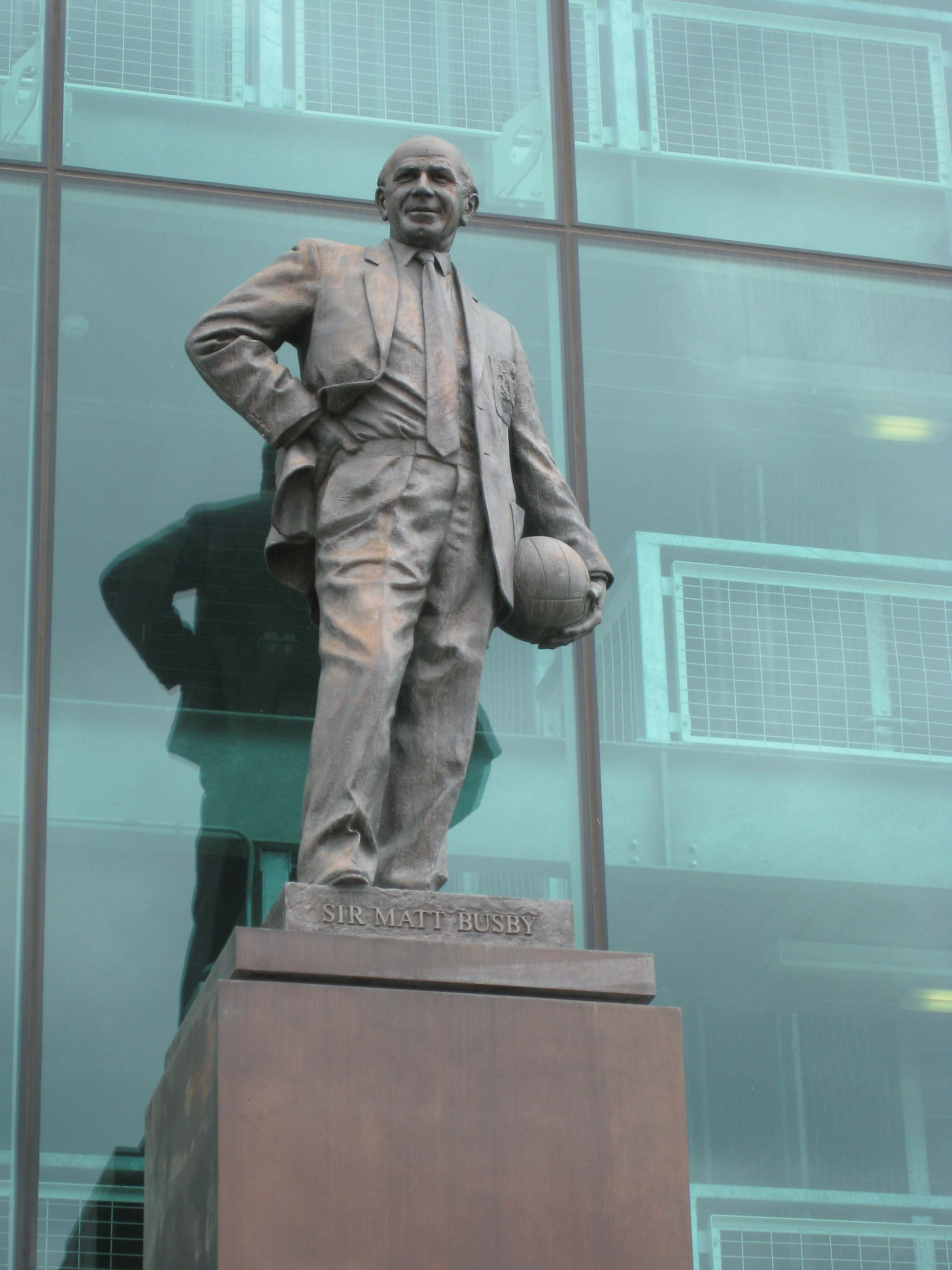
A statue of Busby in front of Old Trafford stadium

The biggest success of his career came on 29 May 1968 when the team won the European Cup. He retired as manager at the end of the following season, having announced his intention to do so on 14 January 1969, but remained at the club as a director, handing over managerial duties to trainer and former player Wilf McGuinness. When McGuinness was sacked in December 1970, Busby returned to the manager's seat on an interim basis until a new permanent appointment was made after the end of the season. The job went to Frank O'Farrell in June 1971 after United were unsuccessful in approaching Jock Stein and Don Revie. He carried on as a club director for 11 years, before being made president in 1980.

Busby was appointed a CBE in the 1958 Birthday Honours, and was knighted following the European Cup victory in 1968 in that year's Birthday Honours. He was made a Knight Commander of St Gregory by the Pope in 1972.

== Later years, death and legacy ==
Busby was the subject of This Is Your Life on two occasions: in January 1958 (a month before the Munich tragedy), when he was surprised by Eamonn Andrews at the BBC Studios in Manchester, and in May 1971, when he became the show's first subject to be honoured for a second time. On this occasion, Andrews surprised him just ahead of his final game as interim manager, leading Manchester United in a derby match with Manchester City at Maine Road. His testimonial was held at Old Trafford in August 1991. A Manchester United side featuring a new generation of star players including Mark Hughes and Steve Bruce took on a Republic of Ireland XI.

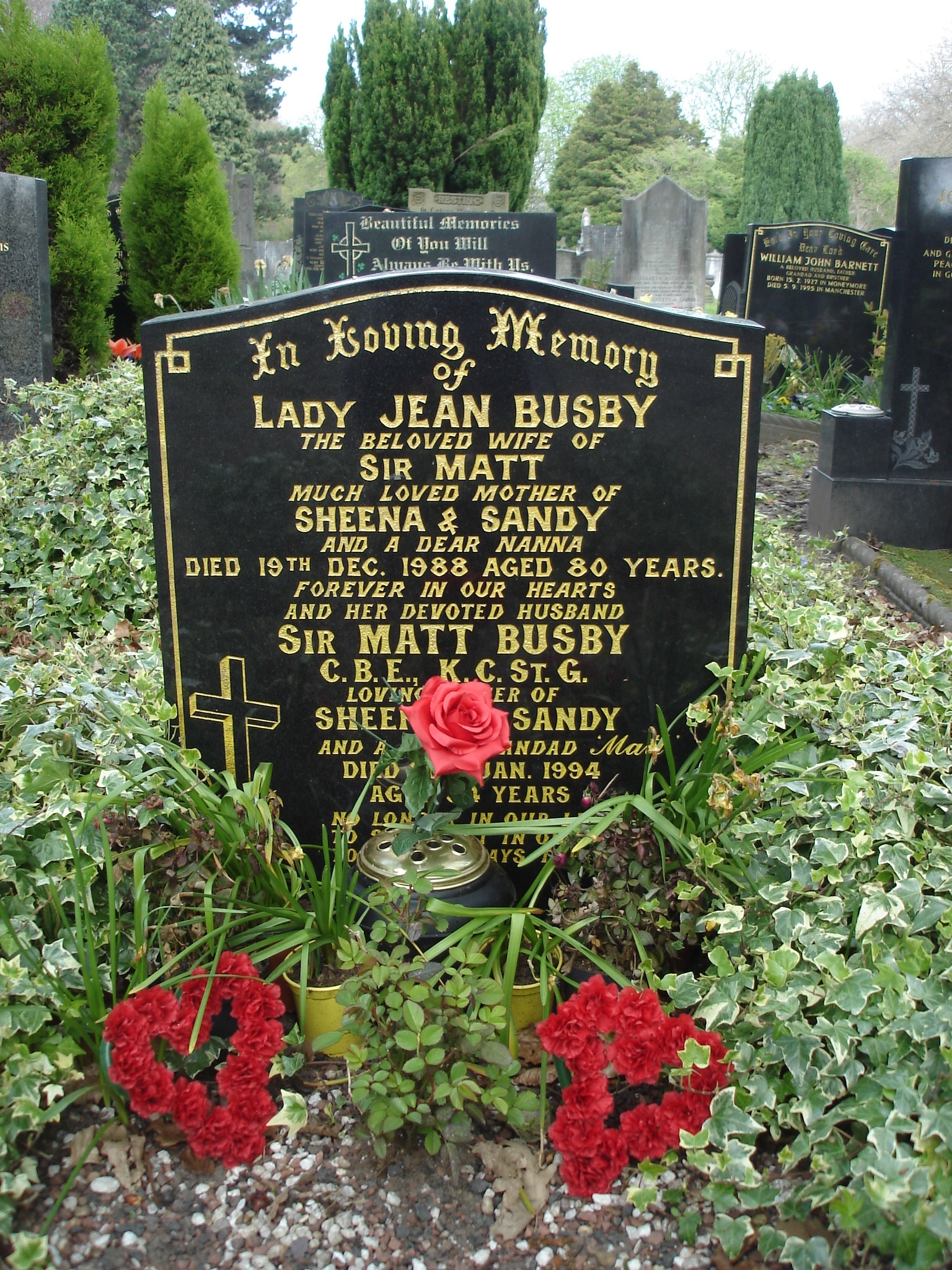
Grave of Busby and his wife, Southern Cemetery, Manchester

Busby suffered a mild stroke in July 1980 at the age of 71 but made a full recovery. Soon afterwards, his wife Jean became ill with Alzheimer's disease. She died, aged 80, in December 1988 in a Manchester nursing home. They had been married for 58 years. Busby died at the age of 84 on 20 January 1994 at the Alexandra Hospital in Cheadle, Greater Manchester. He had been admitted to the hospital earlier that month to have a blood clot removed from his leg, and had appeared to be making a good recovery until his condition deteriorated after several days.

He was buried in Southern Cemetery, Manchester, alongside his wife Jean. His friend Willie Satinoff, who owned a racecourse and died in the Munich air disaster, is buried in the same cemetery. Two days after Busby's death, a minute's silence was held at the start of United's home game against Everton in the league.

The sports centre in Bellshill, his place of birth, was named after him shortly after his death. This opened to the public in 1995. On 6 September 2009, the Sir Matt Busby Shield was contested between Manchester United Reserves and Motherwell. This was held at Fir Park, two miles from Busby's place of birth, to mark 100 years since his birth. Motherwell won the match 1–0.

"Matt Busby is Manchester United. He had a very good apprentice in Alex Ferguson, but he's the man who built it up and he's the guy who put Manchester on the world map."

— John Aston Jr.

In 1999, in securing the treble of Premier League, FA Cup and European Cup, Manchester United won the European Cup on what would have been Busby's 90th birthday – the first time they had won the trophy since Busby's 1968 triumph. Then, in 2008, the club won the Champions League again, 50 years after the Munich tragedy, and 40 years since Busby's own European glory. The day after the centenary of Busby's birth, Manchester United played Barcelona in the 2009 Champions League final and lost to the Spanish side 2–0.

His son Sandy died on 15 September 2014, followed nearly nine months later by his daughter Sheena, who had been married to former Manchester United player Don Gibson for 59 years. He had a total of seven grandchildren, all female. He was the great-uncle of actor Brendan Coyle.

In 2002, Busby was made an inaugural inductee of the English Football Hall of Fame in recognition of his impact on the sport. In the 2018 documentary Busby, Jimmy Murphy Jr, son of Busby's assistant Jimmy Murphy, said "Matt has a name that resounds around football".

== In popular culture ==
Busby was portrayed by actor Dougray Scott in the 2011 television drama United, which was centred on the successes of the Busby Babes and the Munich air crash, as well as the rebuilding of the team by Jimmy Murphy while Busby recovered from his injuries. Busby's son Sandy told BBC News that he was "disgusted" by the film. He pointed out that the character of Busby, despite being the first "tracksuit manager" in English football, was never seen in a tracksuit throughout the film, instead wearing a camel coat and a fedora.

Video
- Footage of Busby, Shankly and Stein in The Three Kings trailer on YouTube

He was mentioned in the Beatles song "Dig It" from the band's final album, Let it Be, released in 1970. Brian Cox portrayed an older Busby (and Charlie Cook a younger Busby in flashbacks to 1958) in the 2013 film Believe. Set in 1984, it imagines Busby taking on the management of a boys' team competing in a local cup. In 2020, Busby, along with two other legendary managers, Bill Shankly and Jock Stein, were the subject of The Three Kings documentary.

== Career statistics ==
=== Playing career ===
Appearances and goals by club, season and competition
Club	Season	League			FA Cup		Charity Shield		Total	
Club	Season	Division	Apps	Goals	Apps	Goals	Apps	Goals	Apps	Goals
Manchester City	1928–29	First Division	0	0	0	0	0	0	0	0
Manchester City	1929–30	First Division	11	3	1	2	0	0	12	5
Manchester City	1930–31	First Division	20	0	1	0	0	0	21	0
Manchester City	1931–32	First Division	41	1	5	0	0	0	46	1
Manchester City	1932–33	First Division	39	1	7	1	0	0	46	2
Manchester City	1933–34	First Division	39	4	8	0	0	0	47	4
Manchester City	1934–35	First Division	35	1	1	0	1	0	37	1
Manchester City	1935–36	First Division	19	1	1	0	0	0	20	1
Manchester City	Total		204	11	24	3	1	0	229	14
Liverpool	1935–36	First Division	11	1	0	0	0	0	11	1
Liverpool	1936–37	First Division	29	1	1	0	0	0	30	1
Liverpool	1937–38	First Division	33	0	3	0	0	0	36	0
Liverpool	1938–39	First Division	42	1	3	0	0	0	45	1
Liverpool	1939–40	First Division	Appearance data unavailable.							
Liverpool	1940–41	First Division	0	0	Appearance data unavailable.					
Liverpool	1941–42	First Division	1	0	Appearance data unavailable.					
Liverpool	1942–43	First Division	0	0	Appearance data unavailable.					
Liverpool	1943–44	First Division	4	0	Appearance data unavailable.					
Liverpool	1944–45	First Division	5	0	Appearance data unavailable.					
Liverpool	Total		115	3	7	0	0	0	122	3
Career total			319	14	31	3	1	0	351	17

=== Managerial career ===
Managerial record by team and tenure
Team	From	To	Record					Ref.
Team	From	To	P	W	D	L	Win %	Ref.
Manchester United	1 October 1945	4 June 1969	1,120	565	263	292	50.4^{1}	
Great Britain	July 1948	August 1948	4	2	0	2	50.0	
Scotland	15 January 1958	December 1958	2	1	1	0	50.0	
Manchester United	29 December 1970	8 June 1971	21	11	3	7	52.4	
Total			1,147	579	267	301	50.5	

^{1}Does not include matches for which Jimmy Murphy served as acting manager following the Munich air disaster.

== Honours ==
=== Player ===
Manchester City

- FA Cup: 1933–34; runner-up: 1932–33

=== Manager ===
Manchester United

- Football League First Division: 1951–52, 1955–56, 1956–57, 1964–65, 1966–67
- FA Cup: 1947–48, 1962–63
- FA Charity Shield: 1952, 1956, 1957, 1965 (shared), 1967 (shared)
- European Cup: 1967–68

=== Individual ===
- PFA Merit Award: 1980
- English Football Hall of Fame (Manager): 2002
- European Hall of Fame (Manager): 2008
- ESPN 7th Greatest Manager of All Time: 2013
- France Football 11th Greatest Manager of All Time: 2019
- World Soccer 36th Greatest Manager of All Time: 2013

=== Orders and special awards ===
- Commander of the Order of the British Empire (CBE): 1958
- Knight Bachelor: 1968
- Knight Commander of the Order of St. Gregory the Great (KCSG): 1972

== See also ==
- List of English football championship–winning managers
- List of longest managerial reigns in association football
- List of football managers with the most matches

== Sources ==
- Barclay, Patrick (2017), Sir Matt Busby: The Definitive Biography, Ebury, ISBN 9781785032080
