= Jackie Bray =

English footballer (1909–1982)

Personal information
- Full name: John Bray
- Date of birth: 22 April 1909
- Place of birth: Oswaldtwistle, England
- Date of death: 20 November 1982 (aged 73)
- Place of death: Blackburn, England
- Height: 5 ft 9 in (1.75 m)
- Position: Left-half

Youth career
- Clayton Olympia

Senior career*
Years	Team	Apps	(Gls)
1928–1929	Manchester Central		
1929–1938	Manchester City	257	(10)

International career
1935–1937	England	6	(0)
	The Football League XI	5	(0)

Managerial career
- 1947–1948: Watford
- 1948: Nelson
- * Club domestic league appearances and goals

John Bray (22 April 1909 – 20 November 1982) was an English footballer who played as a left-half. He won six caps for England between 1934 and 1937. His younger brother, George, was also a professional footballer and spent his entire career with Burnley.

He played for Manchester Central before spending 1929 to 1938 with Manchester City, winning an FA Cup runner-up medal in 1933 and a winners medal in 1934, before helping the club to the First Division title in 1936–37. He guested for numerous clubs during World War II, and briefly managed Watford in the 1947–48 season. After leaving Watford, he served Nelson as player-manager from February to September 1948.

== Early and personal life ==
John Bray was born on 22 April 1909 in Oswaldtwistle, Lancashire; his father was a coal miner, and his mother worked as a cotton weaver. His younger brother, George, also became a professional footballer and spent his entire career with Burnley. Bray married Bertha Chadwick in a private ceremony at Huncoat Village Church, Accrington in April 1936. Bray was also an accomplished cricket player, attached to Accrington Cricket Club. He ran a sports business in Nelson on Pendle Street after his footballing career ended. John Bray died on 20 November 1982, at the age of 72, in Blackburn.

== Club career ==
Bray represented East Lancashire and played for Clayton Olympia before joining Manchester Central by 1928. He signed with Manchester City the following year. He made his debut against Manchester derby rivals Manchester United at Maine Road on 8 February 1930. He helped the "Citizens" to finish third in the First Division in 1929–30. They dropped to eighth place in 1930–31 and then 14th in 1931–32. City reached the FA Cup semi-finals in 1932, where they lost 1–0 to Arsenal at Villa Park. Though they could only manage a 16th-place finish in the league in 1932–33, City reached the FA Cup final, losing 3–0 to Everton at Wembley. They then rose up to fifth place in 1933–34, and won the FA Cup with a 2–1 victory over Portsmouth; Bray played in the final after passing a late fitness test. City finished fourth in 1934–35 and ninth in 1935–36. In 1936–37, Bray was a virtual ever-present as Manchester City took the Football League title. The Maine Road club then dropped to 21st place in 1937–38, and were relegated into the Second Division.

His career was then interrupted by World War II, during which time he served in the Royal Air Force. During the war he guested for Blackburn Rovers, Nottingham Forest, Bolton Wanderers, Crewe Alexandra, Birmingham and Port Vale.

== International career ==
Bray won his first England cap on 29 September 1934 in a 4–0 win over Wales at Ninian Park. He won further caps in games against Ireland at Windsor Park, Germany at White Hart Lane, Wales at Molineux, and Scotland at Wembley. His final appearance was on 17 April 1937, in a 3–1 defeat to Scotland in front of a crowd of 149,407 at Hampden Park. He also played five matches for The Football League XI.

== Management career ==
Bray was appointed as Bill Findlay's successor as manager of Watford on 26 February 1947, as the "Hornets" finished the 1946–47 season in 16th place in the Third Division South. The Vicarage Road club won only 11 of his 40 games in charge, and Bray departed on 20 January 1948, citing "family reasons"; his replacement, Eddie Hapgood, led the club to a 15th-place finish in 1947–48. Bray signed with Lancashire Combination side Nelson as player-coach on 19 February 1948. He led the team to a second-place finish at the end of the 1947–48 season, but tendered his resignation on 13 September 1948.

== Career statistics ==
=== Playing statistics ===
Appearances and goals by club, season and competition
Club	Season	League			FA Cup		Total	
Club	Season	Division	Apps	Goals	Apps	Goals	Apps	Goals
Manchester City	1929–30	First Division	2	0	0	0	2	0
Manchester City	1930–31	First Division	21	0	1	0	22	0
Manchester City	1931–32	First Division	20	1	0	0	20	1
Manchester City	1932–33	First Division	30	0	7	0	37	0
Manchester City	1933–34	First Division	16	2	3	0	19	2
Manchester City	1934–35	First Division	39	1	1	0	40	1
Manchester City	1935–36	First Division	38	1	3	0	41	1
Manchester City	1936–37	First Division	40	2	4	0	44	2
Manchester City	1937–38	First Division	28	2	1	0	29	2
Manchester City	1938–39	Second Division	23	1	0	0	23	1
Career total			257	10	20	0	277	10

=== Managerial statistics ===
Managerial record by team and tenure
Team	From	To	Record					Ref.
Team	From	To	P	W	D	L	Win %	Ref.
Watford	1 March 1947	31 January 1948	40	11	10	19	27.5	
Nelson	19 February 1948	13 September 1948						

== Honours ==
Manchester City

- Football League First Division: 1936–37
- FA Cup: 1933–34; runner-up: 1932–33

England

- British Home Championship 1934–35 (shared)
