= 1944–45 Liverpool F.C. season =

English football club season

Liverpool F.C.
1944–45 season
- Manager: George Kay
- Stadium: Anfield
- North Regional League: 16th & 3rd
- League War Cup: 3rd Round
- Top goalscorer: League: Don Welsh; All: Don Welsh
Home colours	Away colours

The 1944–45 season saw Liverpool compete in the wartime North Regional League. Some matches were also part of the League War Cup and the Lancashire Senior Cup.

== Statistics ==
=== Appearances and goals ===
No.	Pos	Nat	Player	Total		Regional League North	
No.	Pos	Nat	Player	Apps	Goals	Apps	Goals
	FW	(Australia) AUS	Peter Baines	1	1	1	1
	DF	(England) ENG	Jack Balmer	3	0	3	0
	DF	(England) ENG	Jack Blood	5	0	5	0
	MF	(Scotland) SCO	Matt Busby	4	0	4	0
	DF	(England) ENG	Tom Bush	3	0	3	0
	DF	(England) ENG	Jackie Campbell	30	7	30	7
	MF	(Wales) WAL	Horace Cumner	15	3	15	3
	FW	(England) ENG	Ronnie Dix	6	2	6	2
	FW	(England) ENG	Cyril Done	3	4	3	4
	FW	(England) ENG	Harry Eastham	6	1	6	1
	FW	(Scotland) SCO	Willie Fagan	5	4	5	4
			James or Terry Garner	1	0	1	0
	DF	(Wales) WAL	Jeff Gulliver	40	0	40	0
	MF	(England) ENG	Billy Hall	2	0	2	0
	GK		Harold Hall	1	0	1	0
	DF	(Scotland) SCO	Jim Harley	16	0	16	0
	DF	(England) ENG	George Hinsley	3	1	3	1
	GK	(England) ENG	Alf Hobson	37	0	37	0
	DF	(England) ENG	Laurie Hughes	39	0	39	0
	MF	(England) ENG	Mick Hulligan	7	3	7	3
	MF	(England) ENG	Bill Jones	1	0	1	0
			J.E. Jones	1	0	1	0
	DF	(England) ENG	Harry Kaye	32	1	32	1
	GK	(South Africa) RSA	Dirk Kemp	4	0	4	0
	MF	(Scotland) SCO	Bill Kinghorn	9	3	9	3
	MF	(Scotland) SCO	Billy Liddell	15	13	15	13
	DF	(Scotland) SCO	Jimmy McInnes	9	0	9	0
	FW	(Scotland) SCO	Jimmy McIntosh	1	0	1	0
	DF	(Scotland) SCO	Jimmy Mulvaney	1	0	1	0
	MF	(South Africa) RSA	Berry Nieuwenhuys	30	10	30	10
	DF	(Scotland) SCO	George Paterson	3	1	3	1
	MF	(England) ENG	Jack Pilling	36	2	36	2
	FW	(England) ENG	Frank Rawcliffe	1	0	1	0
	DF	(England) ENG	Ken Seddon	5	0	5	0
	FW	(England) ENG	Les Shannon	4	4	4	4
	MF	(England) ENG	Arthur Shepherd	3	1	3	1
	FW	(England) ENG	Jack Smith	2	2	2	2
	DF	(England) ENG	Eddie Spicer	1	0	1	0
	FW	(England) ENG	Phil Taylor	37	17	37	17
	MF	(England) ENG	Sammy Thorpe	1	0	1	0
	FW	(England) ENG	Don Welsh	20	26	20	26
	DF	(England) ENG	Jack Westby	17	1	17	1
	DF	(England) ENG	Bert Whalley	1	0	1	0

== Competitions ==
=== North Region War League, War League Cup and Lancashire Senior Cup ===
26 August 1944 1	Stockport County	2–3	Liverpool	Stockport
	Goal	Report	Done 25', 80 ' Welsh 65' (pen.)	Stadium: Edgeley Park; Attendance: 5,300

2 September 1944 2	Liverpool	2–0	Stockport County	Liverpool
	Fagan 36 ' Done 75 '	Report		Stadium: Anfield; Attendance: 12,418; Referee: J.H. Parker

9 September 1944 3	Liverpool	2–2	Manchester City	Liverpool
	Done 40 ' Nieuwenhuys 87 '	Report	Williamson; Smith	Stadium: Anfield; Attendance: 24,009; Referee: S. McCarthy

16 September 1944 4	Manchester City	2–2	Liverpool	Manchester
	Sproston; Smith	Report	Dix 24' (pen.), 55 '	Stadium: Maine Road; Attendance: 10,000

13 September 1944 5	Crewe Alexandra	4–1	Liverpool	Crewe
	Goal	Report	Welsh	Stadium: Gresty Road; Attendance: 4,500; Referee: A.C. Hall

30 September 1944 6	Liverpool	1–4	Crewe Alexandra	Liverpool
	Eastham	Report	Boothway; A.E. Basnett	Stadium: Anfield; Attendance: 16,894; Referee: K.W. Homer

7 October 1944 7	Liverpool	0–3	Wrexham	Liverpool
		Report	E. Rodgers; Baines; Tudor	Stadium: Anfield; Attendance: 17,427; Referee: J. Lawless

14 October 1944 8	Liverpool	1–2	Wrexham	Liverpool
	Welsh	Report	Goal	Stadium: Anfield; Attendance: 7,976

21 October 1944 9	Everton	0–2	Liverpool	Liverpool
		Report	Smith 27', 80 '	Stadium: Goodison Park; Attendance: 33,199

28 October 1944 10	Liverpool	0–0	Everton	Liverpool
		Report		Stadium: Anfield; Attendance: 26,008; Referee: A. Denham

4 November 1944 11	Liverpool	3–2	Manchester United	Liverpool
	Welsh 17' (pen.); Roughton 67' (o.g.); Welsh 81 '	Report	Woodcock 43'; Mycock 70'	Stadium: Anfield; Attendance: 17,610; Referee: J.E. Thomson

11 November 1944 12	Manchester United	2–5	Liverpool	Manchester
	Mitten; Mycock	Report	Welsh 8', 65', 68 ' Fagan 17 ' Liddell 70 '	Stadium: Maine Road; Attendance: 5,000; Referee: S. Boardman

18 November 1944 13	Bury	2–0	Liverpool	Bury
	Goal	Report		Stadium: Gigg Lane; Attendance: 4,415

25 November 1944 14	Liverpool	3–1	Bury	Liverpool
	Cumner 6 ' Nieuwenhuys 10', 80 '	Report	Berry 25'	Stadium: Anfield; Attendance: 11,377; Referee: E. Berry

2 December 1944 15	Liverpool	6–0	Chester	Liverpool
	Kinghorn; Nieuwenhuys; Taylor; Welsh	Report		Stadium: Anfield; Attendance: 13,609; Referee: A. Baker

9 December 1944 16	Chester	3–2	Liverpool	Chester
	Goal	Report	Campbell 10 ' Nieuwenhuys	Stadium: Sealand Road; Attendance: 3,500

16 December 1944 17	Liverpool	5–1	Tranmere Rovers	Liverpool
	Campbell; Welsh (pen.)	Report	Goal	Stadium: Anfield; Attendance: 4,000

23 December 1944 18	Liverpool	3–0	Tranmere Rovers	Liverpool
	Baines; Taylor	Report		Stadium: Anfield; Attendance: 10,877; Referee: S. McCarthy

25 December 1944 19	Southport	1–4	Liverpool	Southport
	Goal	Report	Kinghorn; Liddell; Taylor	Stadium: Haig Avenue; Attendance: 5,000; Referee: H. Holt
Note: Also counted as a Qualifying Round for the League War Cup competition.

26 December 1944 20	Everton	2–2	Liverpool	Liverpool
	Wainwright 40'; Stevenson 42'	Report	Liddell 75', 77 '	Stadium: Goodison Park; Attendance: 35,226; Referee: J. Phillips

30 December 1944 21	Liverpool	12–1	Southport	Liverpool
	Campbell 15', 49 ' Liddell 16', 17 ' Welsh 18', 26', 27', 56', 62', 68 ' Hulligan 64', 79 '	Report	Dellow 66'	Stadium: Anfield; Attendance: 13,673; Referee: A.C. Hall
Note: Also counted as a Qualifying Round for the League War Cup competition.

6 January 1945 22	Stockport County	2–3	Liverpool	Stockport
	Goal	Report	Shepherd 66 ' Welsh	Stadium: Edgeley Park; Attendance: 3,000
Note: Also counted as a Qualifying Round for the League War Cup competition.

13 January 1945 23	Liverpool	4–1	Stockport County	Liverpool
	Taylor 30', 47 ' Campbell 82 ' Welsh 88 '	Report	K. Shawcross 42'	Stadium: Anfield; Attendance: 14,357; Referee: J.H. Parker
Note: Also counted as a Qualifying Round for the League War Cup competition.

3 February 1945 24	Everton	4–1	Liverpool	Liverpool
	Wyles 40'; Rawlings 43', 78'; McIntosh 75'	Report	Taylor	Stadium: Goodison Park; Attendance: 26,780; Referee: G. Twist
Note: Also counted as a Qualifying Round for the League War Cup competition.

10 February 1945 25	Liverpool	3–1	Everton	Liverpool
	Cumner 15', 81 ' Nieuwenhuys 60 '	Report	Lawton 67'	Stadium: Anfield; Attendance: 33,235; Referee: P. Snape
Note: Also counted as a Qualifying Round for the League War Cup competition.

17 February 1945 26	Bolton Wanderers	2–1	Liverpool	Bolton
	Woodward 11'; Moir	Report	Campbell 60 '	Stadium: Burnden Park; Attendance: 11,494
Note: Also counted as a Qualifying Round for the League War Cup competition.

24 February 1945 27	Liverpool	1–1	Bolton Wanderers	Liverpool
	Campbell 37 '	Report	Goal	Stadium: Anfield; Attendance: 20,966; Referee: S. McCarthy
Note: Also counted as a Qualifying Round for the League War Cup competition.

3 March 1945 28	Southport	0–5	Liverpool	Southport
		Report	Liddell; Pilling; Taylor	Stadium: Haig Avenue; Attendance: 5,000; Referee: J McCann
Note: Also counted as Round One 1st Leg for the Lancashire Senior Cup competition. Due to commitments elsewhere Liverpool had to scratch from the competition thereby awarding Southport a walkover to Round Two.

10 March 1945 29	Liverpool	3–1	Tranmere Rovers	Liverpool
	Nieuwenhuys 22 ' Hinsley 44 ' Taylor 84 '	Report	Glidden	Stadium: Anfield; Attendance: 15,102; Referee: J Delaney
Note: Also counted as a Qualifying Round for the League War Cup competition.

17 March 1945 30	Tranmere Rovers	1–2	Liverpool	Birkenhead
	J. Kinder	Report	Hulligan; Liddell	Stadium: Prenton Park; Attendance: 7,000; Referee: A. Baker
Note: Also counted as a Qualifying Round for the League War Cup competition.

24 March 1945 31	Liverpool	1–0	Everton	Liverpool
	Liddell 8 '	Report		Stadium: Anfield; Attendance: 39,640; Referee: J. Boardman
Note: Also counted as Round One 1st Leg for the League War Cup competition.

31 March 1945 32	Everton	0–1	Liverpool	Liverpool
		Report	Liddell 73 '	Stadium: Goodison Park; Attendance: 51,512; Referee: S. Boardman
Note: Also counted as Round One 2nd Leg for the League War Cup competition.

7 April 1945 34	Liverpool	3–0	Manchester City	Liverpool
	Liddell 40 ' Welsh 69', 89 '	Report		Stadium: Anfield; Attendance: 36,131; Referee: J.H. Parker
Note: Also counted as Round Two 1st Leg for the League War Cup competition.

2 April 1945 33	Liverpool	1–3	Everton	Liverpool
	Shannon 2 '	Report	Jackson 30'; Grant 32'; Wyles 67'	Stadium: Anfield; Attendance: 22,815; Referee: F.W. Wort
Note: Also counted as the Liverpool Senior Cup Final.

14 April 1945 35	Manchester City	1–3	Liverpool	Manchester
	Herd	Report	Taylor; Welsh	Stadium: Maine Road; Attendance: 24,905; Referee: J.H. Parker
Note: Also counted as Round Two 2nd Leg for the League War Cup competition.

21 April 1945 36	Liverpool	0–0	Chesterfield	Liverpool
		Report		Stadium: Anfield; Attendance: 35,001; Referee: F.S. Milner
Note: Also counted as Round Three 1st Leg for the League War Cup competition.

28 April 1945 37	Chesterfield	1–0	Liverpool	Chesterfield
	Goal	Report		Stadium: Saltergate; Attendance: 27,000; Referee: F.S. Milner
Note: Also counted as Round Three 2nd Leg for the League War Cup competition.

5 May 1945 38	Liverpool	3–2	Oldham Athletic	Liverpool
	Nieuwenhuys; Shannon; Taylor	Report	Goal	Stadium: Anfield; Attendance: 2,000

9 May 1945 39	Liverpool	5–1	Preston North End	Liverpool
	Shannon; Taylor; Kaye (pen.)	Report	Goal	Stadium: Anfield; Attendance: 35,000

12 May 1945 40	Oldham Athletic	0–7	Liverpool	Oldham
		Report	Kinghorn; Nieuwenhuys; Paterson; Pilling; Taylor; Westby	Stadium: Boundary Park; Attendance: 2,000

19 May 1945 41	Liverpool	2–0	Blackpool	Liverpool
	Fagan 30', 50 '	Report		Stadium: Anfield; Attendance: 16,807

21 May 1945 42	Derby County	1–0	Liverpool	Derby
	Goal	Report		Stadium: Baseball Ground; Attendance: 16,723; Referee: Capt’ Bear
