= Bill Dale (footballer) =

English footballer

Personal information
- Full name: William Dale
- Date of birth: 17 February 1905
- Place of birth: Manchester, Lancashire, England
- Height: 5 ft 9 in (1.75 m)
- Position: Full-back

Senior career*
Years	Team	Apps	(Gls)
- Sandbach Ramblers
1925–1931	Manchester United	64	(0)
1931–1938	Manchester City	237	(0)
1938–1940	Ipswich Town	43	(0)
- * Club domestic league appearances and goals

William Dale (17 February 1905 – 1987) was an English footballer who played as a full-back.

Born in Manchester, he started his career with Sandbach Ramblers before joining Manchester United as an amateur in April 1925. He turned professional in May 1926 and made his debut on 25 August 1928, playing at right-back in a 1–1 draw with Leicester City at Old Trafford. In six years at United, Dale made 64 appearances for the club, before joining Manchester City in December 1931. He had a six-year career in the blue of Manchester City, appearing 236 times, winning the 1937 FA Charity Shield against Sunderland. He later played for Ipswich Town before the Second World War brought his career to a halt.

== Career statistics ==
Appearances and goals by club, season and competition
Club	Season	League		FA Cup		Other		Total	
Club	Season	Apps	Goals	Apps	Goals	Apps	Goals	Apps	Goals
Manchester United	1928–29	19	0	0	0	0	0	19	0
Manchester United	1929–30	19	0	0	0	0	0	19	0
Manchester United	1930–31	22	0	4	0	0	0	26	0
Manchester United	1931–32	4	0	0	0	0	0	4	0
Manchester United	Total	64	0	4	0	0	0	68	0
Manchester City	1931–32	21	0	5	0	—		26	0
Manchester City	1932–33	39	0	7	0	—		46	0
Manchester City	1933–34	31	0	8	0	—		39	0
Manchester City	1934–35	39	0	1	0	1	0	41	0
Manchester City	1935–36	41	0	3	0	—		44	0
Manchester City	1936–37	36	0	3	0	—		39	0
Manchester City	1937–38	30	0	5	0	1	0	36	0
Manchester City	Total	237	0	32	0	2	0	271	0
Career total		301	0	36	0	2	0	339	0

== Honours ==
Manchester City

- FA Cup: 1933–34; runner-up: 1932–33
