= 1938–39 Liverpool F.C. season =

English football club season

Liverpool F.C.
1938–39 season
- Manager: George Kay
- Stadium: Anfield
- First Division: 11th
- FA Cup: Fifth round
- Top goalscorer: League: Willie Fagan and Berry Nieuwenhuys; All: Berry Nieuwenhuys
- Average home league attendance: 32,160
Home colours	Away colours

The 1938–39 season was the 47th season in Liverpool F.C.'s existence, and the club ended the season in 11th place. Liverpool reached the fifth round of the FA Cup but were knocked out by Wolverhampton Wanderers.

== Squad statistics ==
=== Appearances and goals ===
No.	Pos	Nat	Player	Total		Division 1		FA Cup	
No.	Pos	Nat	Player	Apps	Goals	Apps	Goals	Apps	Goals
	FW	(England) ENG	Jack Balmer	45	14	42	10	3	4
	DF	(England) ENG	John Browning	2	0	2	0	0	0
	DF	(Scotland) SCO	Matt Busby	45	1	42	1	3	0
	DF	(England) ENG	Tom Bush	25	1	23	1	2	0
	DF	(England) ENG	Tommy Cooper	36	0	36	0	0	0
	FW	(England) ENG	Harry Eastham	9	2	7	1	2	1
	FW	(Scotland) SCO	Willie Fagan	42	15	39	14	3	1
	DF	(England) ENG	Matt FitzSimmons	1	0	1	0	0	0
	DF	(Scotland) SCO	Jim Harley	34	0	31	0	3	0
	DF	(Wales) WAL	Ronnie Jones	3	0	3	0	0	0
	GK	(South Africa) RSA	Dirk Kemp	10	0	7	0	3	0
	MF	(Scotland) SCO	Bill Kinghorn	19	4	19	4	0	0
	DF	(Scotland) SCO	Jimmy McInnes	37	0	34	0	3	0
	MF	(South Africa) RSA	Berry Nieuwenhuys	42	16	39	14	3	2
	FW	(Scotland) SCO	George Paterson	3	1	2	0	1	1
	DF	(England) ENG	Keith Peters	1	0	1	0	0	0
	DF	(England) ENG	Barney Ramsden	13	3	10	0	3	3
	GK	(South Africa) RSA	Arthur Riley	35	0	35	0	0	0
	DF	(England) ENG	Fred Rogers	31	1	30	0	1	1
	FW	(England) ENG	John Shafto	4	0	4	0	0	0
	DF	(England) ENG	Phil Taylor	42	17	39	14	3	3
	MF	(South Africa) RSA	Harman van den Berg	16	3	16	3	0	0

== Table ==
Pos	Team	Pld	W	D	L	GF	GA	GAv	Pts
9	Preston North End	42	16	12	14	63	59	1.068	44
10	Grimsby Town	42	16	11	15	61	69	0.884	43
11	Liverpool	42	14	14	14	62	63	0.984	42
12	Aston Villa	42	16	9	17	71	60	1.183	41
13	Leeds United	42	16	9	17	59	67	0.881	41

Source: World Football
Rules for classification: 1) Points; 2) Goal average; 3) Goals scored

== Results ==
these were the results of Liverpool's matches in the 1938-39 season.

=== First division ===
27 August 1938 1	Liverpool	2–1	Chelsea	Liverpool
15:15	Taylor 35' 78'	Report	Allum	Stadium: Anfield; Attendance: 33,868

3 September 1938 2	Preston North End	1–0	Liverpool	Preston
15:15	Beattie	Report		Stadium: Deepdale; Attendance: 22,340

7 September 1938 3	Liverpool	1–0	Manchester United	Liverpool
18:15	Nieuwenhuys 15'	Report		Stadium: Anfield; Attendance: 25,050

10 September 1938 4	Liverpool	1–0	Charlton Athletic	Liverpool
15:15	Busby 70'	Report		Stadium: Anfield; Attendance: 32,701

14 September 1938 5	Liverpool	3–1	Middlesbrough	Liverpool
18:00	Fagan 55' 75'; Nieuwenhuys 90'	Report	Fenton	Stadium: Anfield; Attendance: 25,535

17 September 1938 6	Bolton Wanderers	3–1	Liverpool	Bolton
15:15	Roberts; Hunt	Report	Taylor 77'	Stadium: Burnden Park; Attendance: 22,409

24 September 1938 7	Liverpool	3–0	Leeds United	Liverpool
15:15	Fagan 51'; Balmer 61'; Taylor 86'	Report		Stadium: Anfield; Attendance: 32,197

1 October 1938 8	Everton	2–1	Liverpool	Liverpool
15:15	Bentham 14'; Boyes 39'	Report	Fagan 43' (pen.)	Stadium: Goodison Park; Attendance: 64,997

8 October 1938 9	Leicester City	2–2	Liverpool	Leicester
15:00	Dewis; Griffiths	Report	Nieuwenhuys 73' van den Berg 89'	Stadium: Filbert Street; Attendance: 13,559

15 October 1938 10	Liverpool	3–0	Aston Villa	Liverpool
15:15	van den Berg 6'; Balmer 34'; Fagan 38'	Report		Stadium: Anfield; Attendance: 41,224

22 October 1938 11	Wolverhampton Wanderers	2–2	Liverpool	Wolverhampton
15:00	Mcintosh; Westcott	Report	Taylor 75'; Nieuwenhuys 77'	Stadium: Molineux; Attendance: 25,668

29 October 1938 12	Liverpool	3–3	Huddersfield Town	Liverpool
15:00	van den Berg 1'; Fagan 63' (pen.); Balmer 85'	Report	Beasley; Baird; Price	Stadium: Anfield; Attendance: 33,734

5 November 1938 13	Portsmouth	1–1	Liverpool	Portsmouth
14:45	Anderson	Report	Nieuwenhuys 10'	Stadium: Fratton Park; Attendance: 22,663

12 November 1938 14	Liverpool	2–2	Arsenal	Liverpool
14:45	Nieuwenhuys 41' 50'	Report	Drake; Kirchen	Stadium: Anfield; Attendance: 42,540

19 November 1938 15	Brentford	2–1	Liverpool	Brentford
14:30	Holliday	Report	Nieuwenhuys 40'	Stadium: Griffin Park; Attendance: 20,977

26 November 1938 16	Liverpool	1–0	Blackpool	Liverpool
14:30	Kinghorn 10'	Report		Stadium: Anfield; Attendance: 26,752

3 December 1938 17	Derby County	2–2	Liverpool	Derby
14:15	Crooks; McCulloch	Report	Taylor 34'; Kinghorn 88'	Stadium: Baseball Ground; Attendance: 24,723

10 December 1938 18	Liverpool	2–2	Grimsby Town	Liverpool
14:15	Nieuwenhuys 30'; Fagan 33'	Report	Boyd; Betmead	Stadium: Anfield; Attendance: 26,343

17 December 1938 19	Sunderland	2–3	Liverpool	Sunderland
14:00	Bolton 3'; Duns 73'	Report	Kinghorn 37'; Bush 50'; Taylor 78'	Stadium: Roker Park; Attendance: 15,309; Referee: Martin W

24 December 1938 20	Chelsea	4–1	Liverpool	London
14:20	Payne; Spence; Burgess	Report	Balmer 75'	Stadium: Stamford Bridge; Attendance: 6,801

26 December 1938 21	Stoke City	3–1	Liverpool	Stoke-on-Trent
14:20	Baker; Sale	Report	Fagan 89'	Stadium: Victoria Ground; Attendance: 18,182

27 December 1938 22	Liverpool	1–0	Stoke City	Liverpool
14:15	Fagan 54'	Report		Stadium: Anfield; Attendance: 45,724

31 December 1938 23	Liverpool	4–1	Preston North End	Liverpool
14:30	Taylor 33' 88'; Fagan 34' (pen.); Balmer 85'	Report	Mutch	Stadium: Anfield; Attendance: 30,453

2 January 1939 24	Middlesbrough	3–0	Liverpool	Middlesbrough
14:15	Fenton; Milne	Report		Stadium: Ayresome Park; Attendance: 25,309

14 January 1939 25	Charlton Athletic	1–3	Liverpool	London
14:45	Tadman	Report	Eastham 25'; Balmer 39' 89'	Stadium: The Valley; Attendance: 19,836

25 January 1939 26	Liverpool	1–2	Bolton Wanderers	Liverpool
15:00	Fagan 55'	Report	Hunt; Sinclair	Stadium: Anfield; Attendance: 17,705

28 January 1939 27	Leeds United	1–1	Liverpool	Leeds
15:00	Hodgson 84'	Report	Balmer 88'	Stadium: Elland Road; Attendance: 13,679; Referee: Clark SL

4 February 1939 28	Liverpool	0–3	Everton	Liverpool
15:15		Report	Bentham 14'; Lawton 73' 82'	Stadium: Anfield; Attendance: 55,994

18 February 1939 29	Aston Villa	2–0	Liverpool	Birmingham
15:00	Broome 30' 38'	Report		Stadium: Villa Park; Attendance: 39,705; Referee: Rudd RG

25 February 1939 30	Liverpool	0–2	Wolverhampton Wanderers	Liverpool
15:15		Report	Westcott; Dorsett	Stadium: Anfield; Attendance: 54,796

4 March 1939 31	Liverpool	1–1	Leicester City	Liverpool
15:15	Taylor 82'	Report	Smith	Stadium: Anfield; Attendance: 25,451

11 March 1939 32	Liverpool	4–4	Portsmouth	Liverpool
15:15	Fagan 16'; Taylor 27' 51'; Nieuwenhuys 62'	Report	Parker 44'; Anderson 66'; Barlow 67'; McAlinden 72'	Stadium: Anfield; Attendance: 18,380

15 March 1939 33	Huddersfield Town	1–1	Liverpool	Huddersfield
15:15	Price	Report	Nieuwenhuys 85'	Stadium: Leeds Road; Attendance: 7,704

18 March 1939 34	Arsenal	2–0	Liverpool	London
15:30	Kirchen; Drake	Report		Stadium: Highbury; Attendance: 31,495

25 March 1939 35	Liverpool	1–0	Brentford	Liverpool
15:15	Fagan 51' (pen.) (red card) 88'	Report		Stadium: Anfield; Attendance: 18,113

1 April 1939 36	Blackpool	1–1	Liverpool	Blackpool
15:15	Astley	Report	Fagan 20'	Stadium: Bloomfield Road; Attendance: 17,137

7 April 1939 37	Liverpool	4–0	Birmingham	Liverpool
15:15	Balmer; Nieuwenhuys	Report		Stadium: Anfield; Attendance: 31,741

8 April 1939 38	Liverpool	2–1	Derby County	Liverpool
15:15	Taylor 40' 63'	Report	McCulloch	Stadium: Anfield; Attendance: 25,927

10 April 1939 39	Birmingham	0–0	Liverpool	Birmingham
15:00		Report		Stadium: St Andrew's; Attendance: 15,067

15 April 1939 40	Grimsby Town	2–1	Liverpool	Grimsby
15:15	Howe; Jones	Report	Nieuwenhuys 1'	Stadium: Blundell Park; Attendance: 6,164

22 April 1939 41	Liverpool	1–1	Sunderland	Liverpool
15:15	Kinghorn 75'	Report	Carter 55'	Stadium: Anfield; Attendance: 15,607; Referee: Martin W

6 May 1939 42	Manchester United	2–0	Liverpool	Manchester
15:00	Hanlon	Report		Stadium: Old Trafford; Attendance: 12,073

=== FA Cup ===
7 January 1939 3rd Round	Liverpool	3–0	Luton Town	Liverpool
14:30	Balmer 54' 89'; Paterson 83'	Report		Stadium: Anfield; Attendance: 40,431; Referee: Tucker JA

21 January 1939 4th Round	Liverpool	5–1	Stockport County	Liverpool
14:45	Nieuwenhuys 6' 41'; Eastham 29'; Balmer 35' 51'; Fagan (penalty missed)	Report	Reid 26'	Stadium: Anfield; Attendance: 39,407; Referee: Mortimer RA

11 February 1939 5th Round	Wolverhampton Wanderers	4–1	Liverpool	Wolverhampton
15:00	Burton 8'; Westcott 23'; McIntosh 82'; Dorsett 80'	Report	Fagan 54' (pen.)	Stadium: Molineux; Attendance: 61, 315; Referee: Blake RW
