= Kinghorn (disambiguation) =

Kinghorn may refer to:

== Places ==
- Kinghorn, a village in Fife, Scotland
  - Kinghorn railway station in the Scottish village
- Kinghorn (Parliament of Scotland constituency), pre-1707
- Kinghorn, in Greenstone, Ontario
- Kinghorn, in King, Ontario

== Surnames ==
- Barbara Kinghorn (1944–2026), Scottish actress
- Bill Kinghorn (1912–1977), Scottish footballer
- Blair Kinghorn (born 1997), Scottish rugby union player
- Ernest Kinghorn (1907–2001), British Labour Party politician
- Fred Kinghorn (1883–1971), Australian rugby league footballer
- Harry Kinghorn (1886–1955), Scottish footballer
- James Roy Kinghorn (1891–1983), Australian naturalist
- Joseph Kinghorn (1766–1832), English particular Baptist
- Sammi Kinghorn (born 1996), Scottish wheelchair racer

== Other ==
- Battle of Kinghorn, a battle which took place on 6 August 1332 in the Scottish village
- Scott of Kinghorn, shipbuilding company in the Scottish village which closed in 1909

== See also ==
- Edgar Kinghorn Myles
