= Peter Baines =

Peter Baines may refer to:

- Peter Augustine Baines (1787–1843), English Benedictine
- Peter Baines (soccer) (1919–1997), Australian-born footballer
- Peter Baines (academic) (born 1941), Australian geophysicist
