= SS Orara =

SS Orara may refer to a number of ships;

- SS Orara (1894), a 66-ton wooden screw steamer, built in 1894 and sank in 1895.
- SS Orara (1898), a 298-ton wooden screw steamer, built in 1898 and was wrecked in 1899.
- SS Orara (1907), a 1,297-ton screw steamer, built in 1907 and sunk after hitting a mine in 1950.
