= 1945–46 Manchester City F.C. season =

English football club season

Manchester City
1945–46 season
- Manager: Wilf Wild
- Stadium: Maine Road
- War League North Regional League: 10th
- FA Cup: Fourth Round
- Top goalscorer: League: All: Alec Herd (4)
- Highest home attendance: 19,589 vs Barrow; 5 January 1946
- Lowest home attendance: 15,026 vs Bradford Park Avenue; 30 January 1946

The 1945–46 season was Manchester City's final season in the non-competitive War League during the Second World War. However, as the war had ended in September 1945, the FA Cup was allowed to resume for the latter part of the season. The club competed in the North Regional War League and the FA Cup

== FA Cup ==
All ties in this FA Cup campaign up to the Quarter Final were played over two legs in order to help the clubs recover financially following the War.

=== Results ===
Date	Round	Opponents	H / A	Venue	Result F – A	Scorers	Attendance
5 January 1946	Third Round 1st leg	Barrow	H	Maine Road	6 - 2	Herd (3), Constantine (3)	19,589
10 January 1946	Third Round 2nd leg	Barrow	A	Holker Street	2 - 2	Dunkley, Hart	7,377
26 January 1946	Fourth Round 1st leg	Bradford Park Avenue	A	Park Avenue	3 - 1	Smith (2), Herd	25,014
30 January 1946	Fourth Round 2nd leg	Bradford Park Avenue	H	Maine Road	2 - 8	Constantine, Smith	15,026
