= 1947–48 Manchester City F.C. season =

English football club season

Manchester City
1947–48 season
- Manager: Wilf Wild (caretaker); Jock Thomson (from Nov 1947)
- Stadium: Maine Road
- First Division: 10th
- FA Cup: Fifth Round
- Top goalscorer: League: Andy Black (16); All: Andy Black (17)
- Highest home attendance: 78,000 vs Manchester United; 20 September 1947
- Lowest home attendance: 18,393 vs Preston North End; 21 April 1948

The 1947–48 season was Manchester City's 46th season of competitive football and 32nd season in the top division of English football. In addition to the First Division, the club competed in the FA Cup.

== First Division ==
=== League table ===
Pos	Team	Pld	W	D	L	GF	GA	GAv	Pts
8	Portsmouth	42	19	7	16	68	50	1.360	45
9	Blackpool	42	17	10	15	57	41	1.390	44
10	Manchester City	42	15	12	15	52	47	1.106	42
11	Liverpool	42	16	10	16	65	61	1.066	42
12	Sheffield United	42	16	10	16	65	70	0.929	42

Source: World Football
Rules for classification: 1) Points; 2) Goal average; 3) Goals scored

=== Results summary ===
Overall								Home						Away					
Pld	W	D	L	GF	GA	GAv	Pts	W	D	L	GF	GA	Pts	W	D	L	GF	GA	Pts
42	15	12	15	52	47	1.106	42	13	3	5	37	22	29	2	9	10	15	25	13

=== Reports ===
Date	Opponents	H / A	Venue	Result F – A	Scorers	Attendance
23 August 1947	Wolverhampton Wanderers	H	Maine Road	4 – 3	Black, McMorran, Smith, Clarke	67,800
27 August 1947	Everton	A	Goodison Park	0 – 1		53,822
30 August 1947	Aston Villa	A	Maine Road	1 – 1	Clarke	50,000
3 September 1947	Everton	H	Maine Road	0 – 1		44,000
6 September 1947	Sunderland	H	Maine Road	3 – 0	Black, McMorran, Clarke	53,263
10 September 1947	Derby County	A	Baseball Ground	0 - 0		31,000
13 September 1947	Grimsby Town	A	Blundell Park	0 – 1		20,000
17 September 1947	Derby County	H	Maine Road	3 – 2	Smith, McMorran, Capel	35,000
20 September 1947	Manchester United	H	Maine Road	0 – 0		78,000
27 September 1947	Blackburn Rovers	H	Maine Road	1 – 3	Smith	44,900
4 October 1947	Blackpool	A	Bloomfield Road	1 - 1	Wharton	30,000
11 October 1947	Preston North End	A	Deepdale	1 – 2	Black	32,000
18 October 1946	Stoke City	H	Maine Road	3 – 0	Smith (2), Herd	42,408
25 October 1947	Burnley	A	Turf Moor	1 – 1	Fagan	41,626
1 November 1947	Portsmouth	H	Maine Road	1 – 0	Smith	43,000
8 November 1947	Middlesbrough	A	Ayresome Park	1 – 2	Black	40,000
15 November 1947	Charlton Athletic	H	Maine Road	4 – 0	Black (3), McMorran	40,000
22 November 1947	Bolton Wanderers	A	Burnden Park	1 – 2	Linacre	30,000
29 November 1947	Liverpool	H	Maine Road	2 – 0	McMorran, Smith	37,464
6 December 1947	Arsenal	A	Highbury	1 – 1	Black	43,000
13 December 1947	Sheffield United	H	Maine Road	4 – 3	Smith (2), McMorran, Black	27,058
20 December 1947	Wolverhampton Wanderers	A	Molineux Stadium	0 – 1		33,000
26 December 1947	Huddersfield Town	H	Maine Road	1 – 1	Linacre	56,460
27 December 1947	Huddersfield Town	A	Leeds Road	1 – 1	Black	32,634
3 January 1948	Aston Villa	H	Maine Road	0 – 2		50,080
17 January 1948	Sunderland	A	Roker Park	1 – 0	Black	35,659
31 January 1948	Grimsby Town	H	Maine Road	3 – 1	McMorran (2)	34,362
14 February 1948	Blackburn Rovers	A	Ewood Park	0 – 1		31,000
21 February 1948	Blackpool	H	Maine Road	1 – 0	Smith	28,838
6 March 1948	Stoke City	A	Victoria Ground	0 – 3		28,000
13 March 1948	Burnley	H	Maine Road	4 – 1	Smith (2), Clarke (2)	29,605
20 March 1948	Portsmouth	A	Fratton Park	0 – 1		29,000
26 March 1948	Chelsea	A	Stamford Bridge	2 – 2	Linacre, Black	64,369
27 March 1948	Middlesbrough	H	Maine Road	2 – 0	McMorran, Black	39,688
29 March 1948	Chelsea	H	Maine Road	1 – 0	Black	29,034
3 April 1948	Charlton Athletic	A	The Valley	1 – 0	McMorran	37,000
7 April 1948	Manchester United	A	Maine Road	1 – 1	Linacre	71,690
10 April 1948	Bolton Wanderers	H	Maine Road	0 – 2		33,800
17 April 1948	Liverpool	A	Anfield	1 – 1	Black	39,345
21 April 1948	Preston North End	H	Maine Road	0 – 3		18,393
24 April 1948	Arsenal	H	Maine Road	0 – 0		20,782
1 May 1948	Sheffield United	A	Bramhall Lane	1 – 2	Black	24,000

== FA Cup ==
=== Results ===
Date	Round	Opponents	H / A	Venue	Result F – A	Scorers	Attendance
10 January 1948	Third Round	Barnsley	H	Maine Road	2 - 1	Smith, Black	54,747
24 January 1948	Fourth Round	Chelsea	H	Maine Road	2 - 0	Linacre, Smith	45,079
7 February 1948	Fifth Round	Preston North End	H	Maine Road	0 - 1		67,494
