= Jimmy Mulvaney =

Scottish footballer (1921–1993)

Personal information
- Full name: James Mulvaney
- Date of birth: 27 April 1921
- Place of birth: Airdrie, Scotland
- Date of death: June 1993 (aged 72)
- Place of death: Coventry, England
- Position: Defender

Senior career*
Years	Team	Apps	(Gls)
1947–1948	Dumbarton	28	(0)
1948–1950	Luton Town	8	(2)
1950–1951	Brighton & Hove Albion	8	(0)
1951–1952	Bradford City	19	(0)
1952–1953	Bath City		
1953	Halifax Town	1	(0)
1953–1954	Bath City		
1954–1955	Forfar Athletic	1	(0)
Total		65	(2)
- * Club domestic league appearances and goals

James Mulvaney (27 April 1921 – June 1993) was a Scottish professional footballer who played as a defender.

== Career ==
Born in Airdrie, Mulvaney played for Dumbarton, Luton Town, Brighton & Hove Albion, Bradford City, Bath City, Halifax Town and Forfar Athletic.
