= Peter Baines (academic) =

Australian academic

Peter George Baines
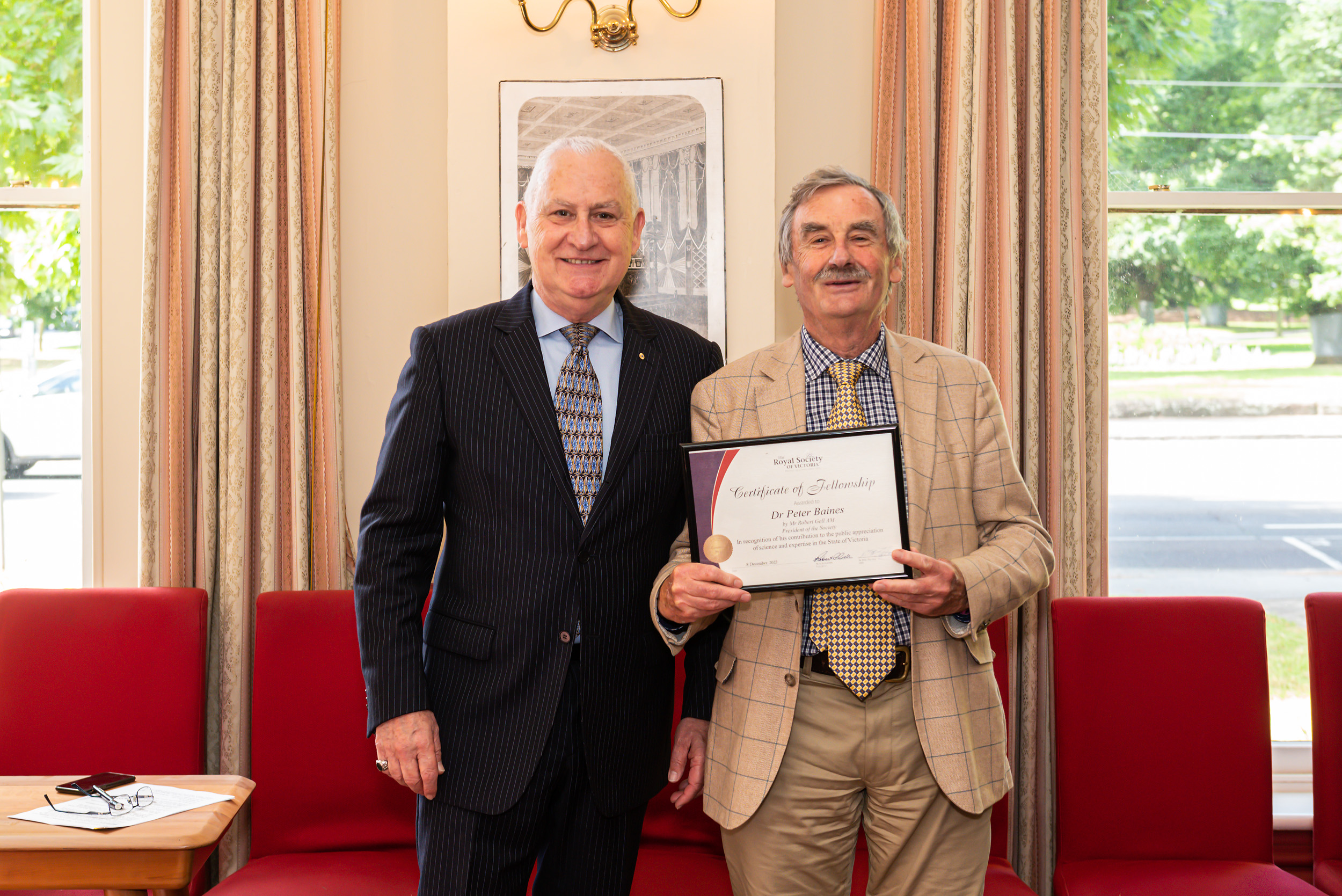
- Born: Melbourne, Australia
- Occupations: Researcher, academic and author
- Awards: Queen's Fellowship in Marine Sciences; AMOS Priestley Medal; AMOS Fellow

Academic background
- Education: Bachelor of Arts with Honours in Mathematics; Bachelor of Science in Physics; Doctor of Philosophy
- Alma mater: Melbourne University; Emmanuel College, Cambridge University

Academic work
- Institutions: Massachusetts Institute of Technology; CSIRO Atmospheric Research; University of Melbourne

Peter George Baines is an Australian geophysicist. He is an honorary senior fellow at University of Melbourne and a Fellow of the Royal Society of Victoria.

Baines has published over 150 research articles and is the author of Topographic Effects in Stratified Flows, published in 1995 (paperback edition 1998). His major research areas include climate dynamics on the decadal time scale, volcano dynamics and Rossby wave hydraulics.

He is or has been the member of various societies such as the American Geophysical Union, Australian Meteorological and Oceanographic Society (AMOS - this new Society's first president, in 1988), Royal Society of Victoria and the Royal Meteorological Society. From 1960 to 1966, he was a member of the Royal Australian Naval Reserve, to the rank of Sub-lieutenant.

== Education ==
Baines attended Royal Australian Naval College from 1955 till 1958 and studied at Melbourne High School in 1959. He received his Bachelor of Arts degree with honours in mathematics and Bachelor of Science degree in physics in 1963 and 1964, respectively, from Melbourne University. He then moved to the United Kingdom where he completed his doctorate in geophysical fluid dynamics from Cambridge University in 1969, on rotating and stratified flows, and double-diffusive convection.

== Career ==
Baines initiated his career as a scientific officer at Aeronautical Research Laboratories in 1964 and worked on various fluid dynamical problems. He became a research student at Department of Applied Mathematics and Theoretical Physics in Cambridge University from 1966 till 1969. He was then appointed as a research associate at the Departments of Meteorology and Earth & Planetary Sciences in Massachusetts Institute of Technology till 1971.

Baines moved back to Australia as a Queen's Fellow in Marine Science in 1971, and joined CSIRO Division of Atmospheric Physics in 1973 as a senior research scientist. He was later promoted to principal research scientist in 1977 to Chief Research Scientist in 1998.

In 2003, he became an Honorary Professorial/Senior Fellow at University of Melbourne, and was awarded a Leverhulme Fellowship held at Bristol University from 2004 to 2005. From 2005 to 2009 he participated in the QUEST programme on Climate Change in the UK, again at Bristol University. From 2003 to 2007, he was president of the ICDM - International Commission for Dynamic Meteorology (ICDM) of IAMAS - the International Association of Meteorology and Atmospheric Sciences.

Baines is a Merle A. Tuve Senior Fellow at the Carnegie Institute of Washington and was the Honorary Secretary at the Royal Society of Victoria until 2021. He serves on the editorial board of the Atmosphere.

== Research and work ==
Baines' main research focus is Geophysical Fluid Dynamics along with Climate Dynamics, incorporating Oceanography, Topographic Effects in Stratified Flows and Volcano Dynamics. His doctoral thesis included work on forced wave motion in rotating and stratified fluids, and a fundamental study of the nature of double-diffusive convection.

=== Stratified fluids ===
Baines has worked on density-stratified fluids since his doctoral studies, with application to both the atmosphere and ocean. This led to a significant number of papers describing theoretical, numerical and experimental studies of the flow of density-stratified fluids over and around topography with a variety of two- and three-dimensional shapes. Whether fluid passes over an obstacle (an isolated mountain, say) or around it depends on a variety of factors (wind profile, stratification, mountain shape), and these studies have, in particular, been helpful in improving the representation of topographic effects in weather-forecasting models. This work has included experimental studies of the flow of dense fluid downslope into density-stratified environments, which has identified a variety of differing flow regimes involving mixing, with applications to oceanic flows in particular. The impact of this work is contained within the book cited below.

In a paper titled A fractal world of cloistered waves, Baines described that waves in stratified fluids in closed containers can have some strange properties, particularly if the container has sloping boundaries.

Baines authored a book titled Topographic Effects in Stratified Flows in 1998 (paperback version in 1998), which utilizes both theory and practical experiments to describe the motion of homogeneous and density-stratified fluids and their flow over and around topography. It is generally regarded as the go-to book on this subject, with application to motion of both the atmosphere and ocean. In a review by Xin-she Yang from University of Leeds, the book is declared having "good balance of basic principles, theory, and experiment, where the comparison is made whenever possible, with a consistent attempt to provide a physical understanding of the phenomena involved." Yang also states that "This book is well organized, addressing a wide spectrum of important problems and properties of stratified flows." N. F. Smyth writes that "this book represents a remarkable synthesis of a large body of work into a very readable and understandable form". Smyth also comments in the review that the book is "easy to follow" and "an excellent book" that is "well produced". Don L. Boyer of Arizona State University considers the book as "an invaluable reference for students and research workers" and congratulated Baines for "very fine piece of work". Boyer also states that "one fact that cannot escape the reader is that the author, Dr. Baines combines the mastery of the analysis involved with an outstanding facility in laboratory experiment", which he considers "very rare indeed in the scientific community".

=== Oceanography ===
Baines has studied oceanography along with stratified fluids, and published articles using the two research areas together. This has included a study of internal (baroclinic) ocean tides, generated by tidal flow over topography such as submarine ridges, continental shelves and slopes, submarine canyons and seamounts.

In 1984, he led an observational study of the oceanic flow through Bass Strait, which involved the only measurements to date of this significant throughflow. In 1989 he published a review paper about the oceanography of Australian waters as a whole, including the ocean currents and tides in the Indian and Southern Oceans, and the coastal oceanography of southern Australia.

In 1987, Baines described the relationship between ocean current transports and electric potential differences across the Tasman Sea, measured using an ocean cable, and explained the connections between them.

=== Climate dynamics ===
Baines worked on climate dynamics from 2005 till 2014 and published various research articles on topics that included the zonal structure of the Hadley circulation, and the effect of the African monsoon on the rainfall of southwest Western Australia. Baines also investigated decadal and multi-decadal variability in the context of climate change, and demonstrated that regional fluctuations in climate occur due to a variety of natural methods, as well as from artificially induced climate change. In 2007, with Chris Folland of the UK Meteorological Office, he identified and described a rapid global climate shift in the late 1960s, that is as yet unexplained.

In 2010, Baines studied how climate changes affect global rainfall, and analyzed a century's worth of data about the global sea surface temperature, to determine the fundamental patterns of climate fluctuations on time scales longer than ENSO, and to relate these fluctuations to probable dynamical processes. In his article titled 'The effect of global dynamical factors on the inter-annual variability of land-based rainfall' in 2014 with B. Henley, Baines studied the factors having major impact on rainfall in the tropics and the mid-latitudes of Australia. His research concluded that seasonal rainfall in Australia is dependent on several dynamic processes but mostly on El Niño-Southern Oscillation and the Indian Ocean Dipole.

=== Volcano dynamics ===
Baines took on the research topic of volcano dynamics in 2005, with a paper with RSJ Sparks on supervolcanic eruptions, and this was extended in 2008 to the effects of varying latitude on such large eruptions.

In 2013 Baines, along with Selwyn Sacks, wrote an article entitled 'Atmospheric internal waves generated by explosive volcanic eruptions' for the UK Geological Society Memoirs volume on the Soufriere Hills volcano on Montserrat. This analysis followed barometric observations of this volcano that sporadically produces Vulcanian explosions spanning several minutes. The sudden addition of thermal energy results in the production of internal waves in the troposphere.

Baines studied the dynamics of intrusions into a density-stratified cross flow and showed that when a buoyant fluid from a steady source such as a volcanic eruption is released into a stratified environment such as our atmosphere, the fluid reaches an equilibrium level after which it spreads in a homogenous manner. This flow is controlled by the law of mass conservation and Bernoulli's equation. The results from this research are applicable in the study of geological sediments.

== Awards and honors ==
- 1971-3 - Awarded a Queen's Fellowship in Marine Science, CSIRO Division of Atmospheric Physics, Aspendale
- 1996 - Member of Royal Society of Victoria, Councillor 1998–2004, 2016–2017, Honorary Secretary 2017-2021
- 1998 - Awarded the Priestley Medal of Australian Meteorological and Oceanographic Society
- 2004 - Awarded Honorary Fellowship of Australian Meteorological and Oceanographic Society
- 2004-5 - Leverhulme Visiting professor, School of Mathematics, University of Bristol
- 2006-2009 - Visiting scientist, QUEST, Department of Earth Sciences, United Kingdom
- 2012 - Merle A. Tuve Senior Fellow, Carnegie Institute of Washington
- 2020 - Elected Fellow of the Australasian Fluid Mechanics Society
- 2021 - Elected Fellow of the Royal Society of Victoria

== Books ==
- Topographic Effects in Stratified Flows (1995, 1998, and 2020)
