= Scott of Kinghorn =

J Scott & Co
- Type: Private
- Industry: Shipbuilding
- Defunct: 1909
- Headquarters: Kinghorn, Fife, Scotland

Scott of Kinghorn was a shipbuilding company at Kinghorn near Burntisland, Fife, Scotland.

== Background ==
The company was founded as J Scott and Company and was trading by the 1870s. Its products included paddle ferries for the Firth of Forth. By the 1900s Scott owned an engine works that built triple-expansion engines for large steamships. The company suffered a trade slump in the Edwardian era and ceased production in 1909.

== Ships built ==
- PS Tantallon Castle (1889)
- PS Laverock (1889)
- Birkenhead (1894)
- Scottish Maid (1899)
- "PS Stirling Castle" (1899)
- Lady Evelyn (1900)
- Ebenezer (1903)
- Duranbah (1905)
- TSS Kempsey (1907)
- Almirante Lobo (1907)
- Orara (1907)
- Eumeralla (1908)
