= Arthur Bolton =

English footballer

Personal information
- Full name: Arthur Frederick Bolton
- Date of birth: 21 November 1912
- Place of birth: Hexham, England
- Date of death: 2001 (aged 88–89)
- Position: Forward

Senior career*
Years	Team	Apps	(Gls)
1937–1938	Ashington		
1938–1940	Sunderland	8	(1)
1946–194?	Ashington		
- * Club domestic league appearances and goals

Arthur Frederick Bolton (21 November 1912 – 2001) was an English professional footballer who played as a forward for Sunderland.
