= Matthew Fitzsimmons =

English footballer

Matthew John Fitzsimmons (born 10 December 1913, date of death unknown) was an English footballer who played as a centre half for Liverpool, Mather United and Ipswich Town. He also featured for York City as a wartime guest. He was born in Toxteth, Liverpool.
