= Tom Bush (footballer, born 1914) =

English footballer

Personal information
- Full name: Thomas Bush
- Date of birth: 22 February 1914
- Place of birth: Hodnet, Shropshire, England
- Date of death: 20 December 1969 (aged 55)
- Position: Defender

Youth career
- 1930–1932: Shrewsbury Amateurs

Senior career*
Years	Team	Apps	(Gls)
1933–1947	Liverpool	61	(1)
- * Club domestic league appearances and goals

Thomas Bush (22 February 1914 – 1969) was an English footballer who played in the Football League for Liverpool.

== Early life ==
Bush was born in Hodnet, Shropshire, on 22 February 1914, the son of a hotel proprietor.

== Career ==
Bush signed for Liverpool in 1933, making his debut in a 1–1 First Division draw with Wolves at Anfield. He scored his first - and only - goal for the club almost five years later, in a 3–2 league win over Sunderland at Roker Park on 17 December 1938.

During World War II, Bush featured as a wartime guest for Brighton & Hove Albion, Leeds United and Fulham, as well as making 35 appearances for Liverpool, scoring once. After the war, he returned to Anfield, making four further appearances up to 1947. After retiring he worked for the club in an administrative capacity, booking travel and meals for the first team, as well as helping to develop youth players at the club's academy.

== Personal life ==
Bush had a daughter, Christine, who died in infancy in 1946, aged nine months.

== Career statistics ==
Official (non-wartime) games only

Appearances and goals by club, season and competition
Club	Season	League			National Cup (Note: Includes FA Cup)		Other		Total	
Club	Season	Division	Apps	Goals	Apps	Goals	Apps	Goals	Apps	Goals
Liverpool	1933–34	Premier League	2	0	0	0	0	0	2	0
Liverpool	1934–35	Premier League	0	0	0	0	0	0	0	0
Liverpool	1935–36	Premier League	0	0	0	0	0	0	0	0
Liverpool	1936–37	Premier League	9	0	0	0	0	0	9	0
Liverpool	1933–38	Premier League	24	0	5	0	0	0	29	0
Liverpool	1938–39	Premier League	23	1	2	0	0	0	25	1
Liverpool	1939–40	Premier League	0	0	0	0	0	0	0	0
Liverpool	1945–46	Premier League	0	0	1	0	0	0	1	0
Liverpool	1946–47	Premier League	3	0	0	0	0	0	3	0
Total			61	1	8	0	0	0	69	1
