= HMAS Orara =

History
- Name: 1907: Orara; 1948: Pearl River; 1949: Hong Shan; 1950: Santos
- Owner: 1907–46: North Coast SN Co; 1946–48: Australian Government; 1948–50: Fu Chan; 1950: Wallem & Co
- Operator: as owners except: 1939–46: (United Kingdom) Royal Australian Navy
- Port of registry: 1907: (Australia) Sydney; 1948: (Taiwan) Canton; 1950: Panama City
- Route: 1907–39: Byron Bay – Sydney
- Builder: Scott of Kinghorn, Kinghorn
- Yard number: 137
- Launched: 5 November 1907
- Completed: November 1907
- Identification: UK official number 121193; code letters HLTM (until 1933); call sign VJVD (1934 onward); pennant number J130 (1939–46)
- Motto: "As they sow, so shall we sweep"
- Fate: Sunk by mine, 19 June 1950
- Badge

General characteristics
- Type: coastal passenger and cargo ship
- Tonnage: 1,297 GRT, 629 NRT
- Length: 240.3 ft (73.2 m)
- Beam: 33.9 ft (10.3 m)
- Depth: 19.9 ft (6.1 m)
- Installed power: 216 NHP
- Propulsion: triple expansion steam engine
- Capacity: passengers: 150 first class; 50 second class

HMAS Orara was a coastal passenger and cargo steamship that was built in Scotland in 1907 and sunk by a mine in China in 1950. She spent most of her career in the fleet of the North Coast Steam Navigation Company (NCSNC) of New South Wales. In the Second World War she was an auxiliary minesweeper and depot ship in the Royal Australian Navy.

This was the second NCSNC ship to be called Orara. The first was a wooden-hulled cargo steamship that was built in 1898 and wrecked in 1899.

== History ==
Scott of Kinghorn built Orara at Kinghorn on the Firth of Forth, launching her on 5 November 1907. She had capacity for 15 first class and 50 second class passengers. Her regular route was between Byron Bay and Sydney.

In 1934 the call sign VJVD superseded Orara's code letters HLTM.

Orara was requisitioned in September 1939 and was commissioned on 9 October into the RAN as an auxiliary minesweeper with the pennant number J130. She served in the 20th Minesweeping Flotilla. She also served as a depot ship.

In 1946 Orara was returned to owners and laid up in Sydney. In 1947 she was sold to Chinese buyers who took her to Shanghai, renamed her Pearl River and registered her in Canton. In 1949 she was renamed Hong Shan. In 1950 she was renamed Santos and registered in Panama City.

On 19 June 1950 Santos was steaming from Shanghai to Qingdao when a mine sank her in the Yangtze River near Wusong, with the loss of a number of lives.
