= George Hinsley =

English footballer

Personal information
- Date of birth: 19 July 1914
- Place of birth: Sheffield, England
- Date of death: 1989 (aged 74–75)
- Height: 5 ft 10 in (1.78 m)
- Position: Wing half

Senior career*
Years	Team	Apps	(Gls)
1935–1938	Barnsley		
1938–1949	Bradford City	114	(17)
1949–1950	Halifax Town	32	(0)
1950–????	Nelson		
- * Club domestic league appearances and goals

George Hinsley (19 July 1914 – 1989) was an English footballer who played for Barnsley, Bradford City, Halifax Town and Nelson.
