= Len Allum =

English footballer

Personal information
- Full name: Leonard Hector Allum
- Date of birth: 16 July 1907
- Place of birth: Reading, England
- Date of death: 15 May 1980 (aged 72)
- Height: 1.75 m (5 ft 9 in)

Senior career*
Years	Team	Apps	(Gls)
- Fulham
- Reading
1927–1932	Maidenhead United		
1932–1939	Chelsea	93	(2)
1939–1940	Clapton Orient		
- * Club domestic league appearances and goals

Leonard Hector Allum (16 July 1907 – 15 May 1980) was an English footballer who played as a half-back.

== Club career ==
Leonard Hector Allum was born in Reading on 16 July 1907 and represented Fulham and his hometown club before scoring on his Maidenhead debut – and four goals in his second game – in April 1927.

A standout centre-half in the 2-3-5 formation prevalent at the time, Len served the Magpies with distinction over five full campaigns, winning the Windsor Hospital Cup, three Maidenhead Hospital Cups, four Berks & Bucks Cups, and the Spartan League title in 1931–32. He then turned professional with Chelsea, making 102 first-team appearances for the Blues between 1932 and 1939 before a stint with Clapton Orient. Len died in Tilehurst, aged 72, on 15 May 1980.
