= 1933–34 Manchester City F.C. season =

English football club season

Manchester City
1933–34 season
- Manager: Wilf Wild
- Stadium: Maine Road
- First Division: 5th
- FA Cup: Winners
- Top goalscorer: League: Alec Herd (17); All: Alec Herd (21) and Fred Tilson (21)
- Highest home attendance: 84,569 v Stoke City (3 March 1934)
- Lowest home attendance: 14,000 v Newcastle United (21 March 1934)

The 1933–34 season was Manchester City's 39th season of competitive football and 27th season in the top division of English football. In addition to the First Division, the club competed in the FA Cup.

== First Division ==
=== League table ===
Pos	Team	Pld	W	D	L	GF	GA	GAv	Pts
3	Tottenham Hotspur	42	21	7	14	79	56	1.411	49
4	Derby County	42	17	11	14	68	54	1.259	45
5	Manchester City	42	17	11	14	65	72	0.903	45
6	Sunderland	42	16	12	14	81	56	1.446	44
7	West Bromwich Albion	42	17	10	15	78	70	1.114	44

Source: World Football
Rules for classification: 1) Points; 2) Goal average; 3) Goals scored

=== Results summary ===
Overall								Home						Away					
Pld	W	D	L	GF	GA	GAv	Pts	W	D	L	GF	GA	Pts	W	D	L	GF	GA	Pts
42	17	11	14	65	72	0.903	45	14	4	3	50	29	32	3	7	11	15	43	13

=== Reports ===
Date	Opponents	H / A	Venue	Result F – A	Scorers	Attendance
26 August 1933	Sheffield Wednesday	H	Maine Road	2 – 3	Herd, Tilson	35,000
30 August 1933	Birmingham City	A	St Andrews	1 - 0	Tilson	30,000
3 September 1933	Leicester City	A	Filbert Street	0 – 0		25,000
6 September 1933	Birmingham City	H	Maine Road	1 – 0	Syrne	20,000
9 September 1933	Arsenal	A	Highbury	1 - 1	Herd	43,412
16 September 1933	Everton	H	Maine Road	2 – 2	Herd, Brook	48,826
23 September 1933	Middlesbrough	A	Ayresome Park	1 – 2	Marshall	9,095
30 September 1933	Blackburn Rovers	H	Maine Road	3 - 1	Cowan, Halliday, Brook	33,343
7 October 1933	Newcastle United	A	St James’ Park	2 – 2	Halliday, Herd	20,000
14 October 1933	Leeds United	H	Maine Road	0 – 1		22,413
21 October 1933	Aston Villa	H	Villa Park	1 – 0	Marshall	35,000
28 October 1933	Sheffield United	A	Bramhall Lane	1 – 1	Tilson	14,000
4 November 1933	Sunderland	H	Maine Road	4 – 1	Brook (2), Toseland, Marshall	25,000
11 November 1933	Stoke City	A	Victoria Ground	1 - 0	Toseland	20,000
18 November 1933	Huddersfield Town	H	St James’ Park	2 – 2	Toseland, Tilson	31,900
25 November 1933	Portsmouth	A	Fratton Park	0 – 2		15,000
2 December 1933	Tottenham Hotspur	H	Maine Road	2 – 0	Brook, Herd	38,021
9 December 1933	Chelsea	A	Stamford Bridge	2 – 1	Herd, Gregory	18,084
16 December 1933	Liverpool	H	Maine Road	2 – 1	Tilson, Herd	15,000
23 December 1933	Wolverhampton Wanderers	A	Molineux Stadium	0 – 8		20,640
25 December 1933	Derby County	A	Baseball Ground	1 – 4	Toseland	32,320
26 December 1933	Derby County	H	Maine Road	2 – 0	Gregory, Brook	57,218
30 December 1933	Sheffield Wednesday	A	Hillsborough Stadium	1 – 1	Busby	24,000
1 January 1934	West Bromwich Albion	H	Maine Road	2 – 7	Herd, Bray	20,996
6 January 1934	Leicester City	H	Maine Road	1 – 1	Herd	20,000
20 January 1934	Arsenal	H	Maine Road	2 – 1	Marshall, Herd	60,401
3 February 1934	Middlesbrough	H	Maine Road	5 - 2	Tilson (2), Brook (2), Busby	22,082
7 February 1934	Everton	A	Goodison Park	0 – 2		17,134
10 February 1934	Blackburn Rovers	A	Ewood Park	0 – 3		14,076
24 February 1934	Leeds United	A	Elland Road	1 – 3	Syme	15,761
7 March 1934	Aston Villa	A	Villa Park	0 – 0		20,000
10 March 1934	Sheffield United	H	Maine Road	4 – 1	Tilson (2), Herd, Busby	18,000
21 March 1934	Newcastle United	H	Maine Road	1 – 1	Wright	14,000
24 March 1934	Stoke City	H	Maine Road	4 – 2	Herd (2), Cowan, Bray	20,000
31 March 1934	Huddersfield Town	A	Leeds Road	0 – 1		20,817
2 April 1934	West Bromwich Albion	A	The Hawthorns	0 – 4		22,198
7 April 1934	Portsmouth	H	Maine Road	2 – 1	Busby, Herd	35,000
11 April 1934	Sunderland	A	Roker Park	0 – 0		10,000
14 April 1934	Tottenham Hotspur	A	White Hart Lane	1 – 4	Toseland	24,576
21 April 1934	Chelsea	H	Maine Road	4 – 2	Tilson (3), Toseland	25,861
2 May 1934	Liverpool	A	Anfield	2 – 3	Herd, Heale	16,000
5 May 1934	Wolverhampton Wanderers	H	Maine Road	4 – 0	Herd (2), Cowan, Heale	21,764

== FA Cup ==
=== Reports ===
Date	Round	Opponents	H / A	Venue	Result F – A	Scorers	Attendance
13 January 1934	Third round	Blackburn Rovers	H	Maine Road	3 - 1	Toseland (2), Brook	54,336
27 January 1934	Fourth round	Hull City	A	Roker Park	2 – 2	Herd, Brook	28,000
31 January 1934	Fourth round replay	Hull City	H	Maine Road	4 – 1	Tilson (2), Toseland, Marshall	49,042
17 February 1934	Fifth round	Sheffield Wednesday	A	Hillsborough Stadium	2 - 2	Herd, ?	72,841
21 February 1934	Fifth round replay	Sheffield Wednesday	H	Maine Road	2 – 0	Tilson 18’, Marshall 25’	68,614
3 March 1934	Sixth round	Stoke City	H	Maine Road	1 - 0	Brook 15’	84,569
17 March 1934	Semi final	Aston Villa	N	Leeds Road	6 – 1	Tilson (4), Toseland, Herd	45,473

=== Final ===
28 April 1934; 15:00 BST	Manchester City	2–1	Portsmouth	Wembley, London
	Tilson 74', 88'		Rutherford 28'	Attendance: 93,258; Referee: Stanley Rous
