= 1932–33 Manchester City F.C. season =

English football club season

Manchester City
1932–33 season
- Manager: Wilf Wild
- Stadium: Maine Road
- First Division: 16th
- FA Cup: Runners-up
- Top goalscorer: League: Fred Tilson (17); All: Fred Tilson (23)
- Highest home attendance: 52,085 v Walsall (28 January 1933)
- Lowest home attendance: 8,428 v Blackburn Rovers (8 October 1932)

The 1932–33 season was Manchester City's 38th season of competitive football and 26th season in the top division of English football. In addition to the First Division, the club competed in the FA Cup.

== First Division ==
=== League table ===
Pos	Team	Pld	W	D	L	GF	GA	GAv	Pts
14	Liverpool	42	14	11	17	79	84	0.940	39
15	Blackburn Rovers	42	14	10	18	76	102	0.745	38
16	Manchester City	42	16	5	21	68	71	0.958	37
17	Middlesbrough	42	14	9	19	63	73	0.863	37
18	Chelsea	42	14	7	21	63	73	0.863	35

Source: World Football
Rules for classification: 1) Points; 2) Goal average; 3) Goals scored

=== Results summary ===
Overall								Home						Away					
Pld	W	D	L	GF	GA	GAv	Pts	W	D	L	GF	GA	Pts	W	D	L	GF	GA	Pts
42	16	5	21	68	71	0.958	37	12	3	6	47	30	27	4	2	15	21	41	10

=== Reports ===
Date	Opponents	H / A	Venue	Result F – A	Scorers	Attendance
27 August 1932	Sunderland	A	Roker Park	2 – 3	Brook (2)	33,000
31 August 1932	Birmingham City	H	Maine Road	1 - 0	Marshall	26,000
3 September 1932	Middlesbrough	H	Maine Road	2 – 3	Marshall (2)	20,211
7 September 1932	Birmingham City	A	St Andrews	0 – 3		20,000
10 September 1932	Arsenal	H	Maine Road	2 - 3	Tilson, Busby	32,542
17 September 1932	Everton	A	Goodison Park	1 – 2	Toseland	32,852
24 September 1932	Blackpool	H	Maine Road	5 – 1	Toseland (2), Halliday (2), Brook	25,175
1 October 1932	Derby County	A	Baseball Ground	0 - 4		13,233
8 October 1932	Blackburn Rovers	H	Maine Road	2 – 3	Halliday, Tilson	8,428
15 October 1932	Leeds United	A	Elland Road	1 – 2	Tilson	16,898
22 October 1932	Bolton Wanderers	A	Burnden Park	1 – 2	Tilson	14,468
29 October 1932	Liverpool	H	Maine Road	1 – 1	Marshall	10,000
5 November 1932	Sheffield United	A	Bramhall Lane	5 – 2	Race (2), Toseland, Marshall, Brook	15,000
12 November 1932	Wolverhampton Wanderers	H	Maine Road	4 - 1	Marshall (2), Comrie, Brook	26,067
19 November 1932	Newcastle United	A	St James’ Park	0 – 2		24,000
26 November 1932	Aston Villa	H	Maine Road	5 – 2	Tilson (4), Brook	20,000
3 December 1932	Leicester City	A	Filbert Street	2 – 1	Tilson, Brook	15,000
10 December 1932	Portsmouth	H	Maine Road	3 – 1	Tilson (2), Cowan	10,000
17 December 1932	Chelsea	A	Stamford Bridge	1 – 3	Tilson	26,240
24 December 1932	Huddersfield Town	H	Maine Road	3 – 0	Toseland, Tilson, Brook	21,252
26 December 1932	Sheffield Wednesday	H	Maine Road	2 – 2	Cowan, Brook	25,000
27 December 1932	Sheffield Wednesday	A	Hillsborough Stadium	1 – 2	Cowan	35,000
31 December 1932	Sunderland	H	Maine Road	2 – 4	Toseland, Tilson	18,000
7 January 1933	Middlesbrough	A	Ayresome Park	0 – 2		7,912
21 January 1933	Arsenal	A	Highbury	1 – 2	Tilson	32,456
1 February 1933	Everton	H	Maine Road	3 – 0	Toseland, Tilson, Brook	10,986
4 February 1933	Blackpool	A	Bloomfield Road	0 - 1		13,399
11 February 1933	Derby County	H	Maine Road	2 – 1	Toseland, Herd	33,611
23 February 1933	Blackburn Rovers	A	Ewood Park	0 – 1		8,931
8 March 1933	Bolton Wanderers	H	Maine Road	2 – 1	Cowan, Herd	19,144
11 March 1933	Liverpool	A	Anfield	1 – 1	Herd	35,000
14 March 1933	West Bromwich Albion	H	Maine Road	1 – 0	Brook	28,200
22 March 1933	Sheffield United	H	Maine Road	1 – 0	Tilson	20,000
25 March 1933	Wolverhampton Wanderers	A	Molineux Stadium	2 – 1	Herd, Brook	26,746
1 April 1933	Newcastle United	H	Maine Road	1 – 2	Brook	30,000
5 April 1933	Leeds United	H	Maine Road	0 – 0		16,789
8 April 1933	Aston Villa	A	Villa Park	1 – 1	Marshall	20,000
15 April 1933	Leicester City	H	Maine Road	4 – 1	Herd (2), Toseland, Marshall	22,000
17 April 1933	West Bromwich Albion	A	The Hawthorns	0 – 4		18,988
22 April 1933	Portsmouth	A	Fratton Park	2 – 1	Herd, Brook	12,000
3 May 1933	Chelsea	H	Maine Road	1 – 4	Brook	14,827
6 May 1933	Huddersfield Town	A	Leeds Road	0 – 1		5,482

== FA Cup ==
=== Results ===
Date	Round	Opponents	H / A	Venue	Result F – A	Scorers	Attendance
14 January 1933	3rd Round	Gateshead	A	Redheugh Park	1 - 1	Toseland	9,123
18 January 1933	3rd Round Replay	Gateshead	H	Maine Road	9 - 0	Brook 15’, Barrass 23’, McMullan 34’, Tilson 39’, 40’, 86’, Busby 53’, Cowan 57’, 63’	22,950
28 January 1933	4th Round	Walsall	H	Maine Road	2 - 0	Brook (2)	52,085
18 February 1933	5th Round	Bolton Wanderers	A	Burnden Park	4 - 2	Brook (3), Tilson	69,912
4 March 1933	6th Round	Burnley	A	Turf Moor	1 - 0	Tilson	48,717
18 March 1933	Semi Final	Derby County	N	Leeds Road	3 - 2	Toseland, Tilson, McMullan	51,961

=== Final ===
29 April 1933; 15:00 BST	Everton	3-0	Manchester City	Wembley, London
	Stein 41'; Dean 52'; Dunn 80'			Attendance: 92,950; Referee: E. Wood
