= Peter Baines (soccer) =

Australian soccer player

Personal information
- Full name: Cecil Peter Baines
- Date of birth: 11 September 1919
- Place of birth: Manchester
- Date of death: 1997 (aged 77–78)
- Position: Inside forward

Senior career*
Years	Team	Apps	(Gls)
- Monsall
1938	Oldham Athletic		
1946	Wrexham	6	(2)
1946	Crewe Alexandra	8	(0)
1947	Hartlepools United	9	(1)
1947	New Brighton	2	(0)
- * Club domestic league appearances and goals

Cecil Peter Baines (11 September 1919 – 1997) was an Australian-born footballer.

Baines played for a number of teams in the Football League Third Division North in the 1930s and 1940s.
