= 1929–30 Manchester City F.C. season =

English football club season

Manchester City
1929–30 season
- Manager: Peter Hodge
- Stadium: Maine Road
- First Division: 3rd
- FA Cup: Fifth Round
- Top goalscorer: League: Tommy Tait (28); All: Tommy Tait (31)
- Highest home attendance: 70,000 v Aston Villa (26 December 1929)
- Lowest home attendance: 10,000 v Leicester City (14 December 1929)

The 1929–30 season was Manchester City's 35th season of competitive football and 23rd season in the top division of English football. In addition to the First Division, the club competed in the FA Cup. City secured a respectable third-place finish, their first top 3 finish since 1920-21 and for the fourth time in the top flight.

== Football League First Division ==
=== League table ===
Pos	Team	Pld	W	D	L	GF	GA	GAv	Pts
1	Sheffield Wednesday (C)	42	26	8	8	105	57	1.842	60
2	Derby County	42	21	8	13	90	82	1.098	50
3	Manchester City	42	19	9	14	91	81	1.123	47
4	Aston Villa	42	21	5	16	92	83	1.108	47
5	Leeds United	42	20	6	16	79	63	1.254	46

Rules for classification: 1) Points; 2) Goal average; 3) Goals scored
(C) Champions

=== Results summary ===
Overall								Home						Away					
Pld	W	D	L	GF	GA	GAv	Pts	W	D	L	GF	GA	Pts	W	D	L	GF	GA	Pts
42	19	9	14	91	81	1.123	47	12	5	4	51	33	29	7	4	10	40	48	18

=== Reports ===
Date	Opponents	H / A	Venue	Result F – A	Scorers	Attendance
31 August 1929	Burnley	H	Maine Road	2 – 2	Marshall, Johnson	22,196
4 September 1929	Arsenal	H	Maine Road	3 - 1	Tilson (2), Marshall	38,458
7 September 1928	Sunderland	A	Roker Park	2 – 5	Johnson, Tilson	35,000
11 September 1929	Arsenal	A	Highbury	2 – 3	McMullan, Brook	23,057
14 September 1929	Bolton Wanderers	H	Maine Road	2 - 0	Brook (2)	36,972
21 September 1929	Everton	A	Goodison Park	3 – 2	Marshall (2), Tilson	32,711
28 September 1929	Derby County	H	Maine Road	3 - 0	Tilson (3)	42,047
5 October 1929	Manchester United	A	Old Trafford	3 – 1	Johnson, Marshall, Brook	57,201
12 October 1929	Portsmouth	A	Fratton Park	2 – 2	Tait, Johnson	20,000
19 October 1929	West Ham United	H	Maine Road	4 – 3	Tait (3), Marshall	20,000
26 October 1929	Liverpool	A	Anfield	6 – 1	Tait (2), Johnson (2), Brook (2)	20,000
2 November 1929	Middlesbrough	H	Maine Road	3 – 1	Toseland, Tait, Harrison	33,302
9 November 1929	Grimsby Town	A	Blundell Park	2 – 2	Tait, Brook	14,311
16 November 1929	Newcastle United	H	Maine Road	3 – 0	Marshall, Tait, Brook	30,000
23 November 1929	Sheffield United	A	Bramhall Lane	2 – 1	Marshall, Brook	12,000
30 November 1929	Huddersfield Town	H	Maine Road	1 – 1	Tait	28,476
7 December 1929	Birmingham City	A	St Andrews	0 – 3		18,000
14 December 1929	Leicester City	H	Maine Road	3 – 2	Johnson (2), Brook	10,000
21 December 1929	Blackburn Rovers	A	Ewood Park	3 – 1	Marshall (3)	20,483
25 December 1929	Aston Villa	A	Villa Park	2 – 0	Tait (2)	39,803
26 December 1929	Aston Villa	H	Maine Road	1 – 2	Tait	70,000
28 December 1929	Burnley	A	Turf Moor	2 – 4	Johnson, Cowan	30,239
1 January 1930	Sheffield Wednesday	H	Maine Road	3 – 3	McMullan, Marshall, Brook	51,546
4 January 1930	Sunderland	H	Maine Road	2 – 2	Marshall (2)	30,000
18 January 1930	Bolton Wanderers	A	Burnden Park	2 – 1	Johnson, Brook	42,543
1 February 1930	Derby County	A	Baseball Ground	2 - 4	Tait, Brook	18,463
5 February 1930	Everton	H	Maine Road	1 – 2	Marshall	24,063
8 February 1930	Manchester United	H	Maine Road	0 – 1		64,472
22 February 1930	West Ham United	A	Boleyn Ground	0 – 3		28,000
26 February 1930	Portsmouth	H	Maine Road	5 – 2	Tait (3), Toseland, Brook	20,000
1 March 1930	Liverpool	H	Maine Road	4 – 3	Tait (2), Johnson, Brook	22,000
8 March 1930	Middlesbrough	A	Ayresome Park	0 – 1		15,739
15 March 1930	Grimsby Town	H	Maine Road	3 – 1	Tait (2), Barass	26,462
22 March 1930	Newcastle United	A	Maine Road	2 – 2	Tait, Busby	30,000
29 March 1930	Sheffield United	H	Maine Road	2 – 1	Brook, Hedley	25,000
5 April 1930	Huddersfield Town	A	Leeds Road	1 – 1	Busby	14,180
12 April 1930	Birmingham City	H	Maine Road	1 – 4	Hedley	25,000
19 April 1930	Leicester City	A	Filbert Street	1 – 3	Tait	10,000
21 April 1930	Leeds United	H	Maine Road	4 – 1	Tait (3)	23,578
22 April 1930	Leeds United	A	Elland Road	2 – 3	Ridding, Busby	16,636
26 April 1929	Blackburn Rovers	H	Maine Road	1 – 1	Toseland	19,868
3 May 1930	Sheffield Wednesday	A	Hillsborough Stadium	1 – 5	Tait	33,000

== FA Cup ==
=== Results ===
Date	Round	Opponents	H / A	Venue	Result F – A	Scorers	Attendance
11 January 1930	3rd Round	Tottenham Hotspur	A	White Hart Lane	2-2	Toseland, Cowan	37,000
15 January 1930	3rd Round Replay	Tottenham Hotspur	H	Maine Road	4–1	Toseland, Marshall, Busby (2)	37,716
25 January 1930	4th Round	Swindon Town	A	County Ground	1-1	Cowan	23,697
29 January 1930	4th Round Replay	Swindon Town	H	Maine Road	10–1	Marshall (5), Johnson (3), Tait, Brook	46,082
15 February 1930	5th Round	Hull City	H	Maine Road	1–2	Toseland	61,574
