= 1930–31 Manchester City F.C. season =

English football club season

Manchester City
1930–31 season
- Manager: Peter Hodge
- Stadium: Maine Road
- First Division: 8th
- FA Cup: Third Round
- Top goalscorer: League: Eric Brook (16); All: Eric Brook (16)
- Highest home attendance: 56,750 v Arsenal (25 December 1930)
- Lowest home attendance: 11,479 v Birmingham City (17 January 1931)

The 1930–31 season was Manchester City's 36th season of competitive football and 24th season in the top division of English football. In addition to the First Division, the club competed in the FA Cup.

== First Division ==
=== League table ===
Pos	Team	Pld	W	D	L	GF	GA	GAv	Pts
6	Derby County	42	18	10	14	94	79	1.190	46
7	Middlesbrough	42	19	8	15	98	90	1.089	46
8	Manchester City	42	18	10	14	75	70	1.071	46
9	Liverpool	42	15	12	15	86	85	1.012	42
10	Blackburn Rovers	42	17	8	17	83	84	0.988	42

Source: World Football
Rules for classification: 1) Points; 2) Goal average; 3) Goals scored

=== Results summary ===
Overall								Home						Away					
Pld	W	D	L	GF	GA	GAv	Pts	W	D	L	GF	GA	Pts	W	D	L	GF	GA	Pts
42	18	10	14	75	70	1.071	46	13	2	6	41	29	28	5	8	8	34	41	18

=== Reports ===
Date	Opponents	H / A	Venue	Result F–A	Scorers	Attendance
30 August 1930	Sunderland	A	Roker Park	3–3	Barass, Tait, Brook	30,000
3 September 1930	Blackpool	H	Maine Road	2–4	Toseland, Brook	34,908
6 September 1930	Leicester City	H	Maine Road	0–2		25,000
8 September 1930	Leeds United	A	Elland Road	2–4	Brook (2)	12,295
13 September 1930	Birmingham City	A	St Andrews	2–3	Tait, Brook	17,705
17 September 1930	Leeds United	H	Maine Road	1–0	Brook	17,051
20 September 1930	Sheffield United	H	Maine Road	0–4		23,260
27 September 1930	Derby County	A	Baseball Ground	1–1	Tait	14,264
4 October 1930	Manchester United	H	Maine Road	4–1	Tait (2), Marshall (2)	45,000
11 October 1930	Portsmouth	H	Maine Road	1–3	Marshall	30,000
18 October 1930	Sheffield Wednesday	A	Hillsborough Stadium	1–1	Tait	20,000
25 October 1930	Grimsby Town	H	Maine Road	1–0	Marshall	24,770
1 November 1930	Liverpool	A	Anfield	2–0	Austin, Tilson	25,000
8 November 1930	Middlesbrough	H	Maine Road	4–2	Tait (2), Race, Marshall	24,035
15 November 1930	Chelsea	A	Stamford Bridge	0–2		25,671
22 November 1930	Birmingham City	H	Maine Road	3–0	Halliday (2), Marshall	23,481
29 November 1930	Huddersfield Town	H	Maine Road	1–1	Brook	14,118
6 December 1930	Newcastle United	H	Maine Road	2–0	Halliday, Tilson	20,000
13 December 1930	West Ham United	A	Boleyn Ground	0–2		22,000
20 December 1930	Aston Villa	H	Maine Road	3–1	Toseland, Halliday, Brook	30,000
25 December 1930	Arsenal	H	Maine Road	1–4	Tilson	56,750
26 December 1930	Arsenal	A	Highbury	1–3	Marshall	17,624
27 December 1930	Sunderland	H	Maine Road	2–0	Marshall, Ridding	20,000
1 January 1931	Blackburn Rovers	A	Ewood Park	1–0	Toseland	27,965
3 January 1931	Leicester City	A	Filbert Street	2–3	Halliday (2)	15,000
17 January 1931	Birmingham City	H	Maine Road	4–2	Brook (2), Tilson, Wrightson	11,479
28 January 1931	Sheffield United	A	Bramhall Lane	2–2	Toseland, Halliday	8,000
31 January 1931	Derby County	H	Maine Road	4–2	Halliday (2), Toseland, Roberts	14,739
7 February 1931	Manchester United	A	Old Trafford	3–1	Brook, Toseland, Halliday	39,876
18 February 1931	Portsmouth	A	Fratton Park	1–1	Halliday	5,000
21 February 1931	Sheffield Wednesday	H	Maine Road	2–0	Halliday (2)	25,000
28 February 1931	Grimsby Town	A	Blundell Park	5–3	Toseland, Marshall, Halliday, Roberts, Brook	12,611
7 March 1931	Liverpool	H	Maine Road	1–1	Barrass	18,000
14 March 1931	Middlesbrough	A	Ayresome Park	1–4	Cowan	12,661
21 March 1931	Chelsea	H	Maine Road	2–0	Marshall, Wrightson	27,866
28 March 1931	Bolton Wanderers	A	Burnden Park	1–1	Brook	17,398
3 April 1931	Blackburn Rovers	H	Maine Road	3–0	Brook (2), Toseland	24,398
4 April 1931	Huddersfield Town	H	Maine Road	0–1		25,000
11 April 1931	Newcastle United	A	St James’ Park	1–0	Brook	20,000
18 April 1931	West Ham United	H	Maine Road	1–1	Cowan	15,000
25 April 1931	Aston Villa	A	Villa Park	2–4	Toseland, Wrightson	17,000
2 May 1931	Blackpool	A	Bloomfield Road	2–2	Toseland, Ridding	18,688

== FA Cup ==
=== Results ===
Date	Round	Opponents	H / A	Venue	Result F–A	Scorers	Attendance
10 January 1931	3rd Round	Burnley	A	Turf Moor	0–3		25,893
