= 1934–35 Manchester City F.C. season =

English football club season

Manchester City
1934–35 season
- Manager: Wilf Wild
- Stadium: Maine Road
- First Division: 4th
- FA Cup: Third Round
- FA Charity Shield: Runners-up
- Top goalscorer: League: Fred Tilson (17); All: Fred Tilson (17)
- Highest home attendance: 79,491 v Arsenal (23 February 1935)
- Lowest home attendance: 15,000 v Wolverhampton Wanderers (5 May 1935)

The 1934–35 season was Manchester City's 40th season of competitive football and 28th season in the top division of English football. In addition to the First Division, the club competed in the FA Cup and the FA Charity Shield.

Following City's FA Cup win, they managed to use their momentum to give Arsenal and Sunderland a strong challenge for the title. However, a poor run of form at the end of the season left them fourth.

== First Division ==
=== League table ===
Pos	Team	Pld	W	D	L	GF	GA	GAv	Pts
2	Sunderland	42	19	16	7	90	51	1.765	54
3	Sheffield Wednesday	42	18	13	11	70	64	1.094	49
4	Manchester City	42	20	8	14	82	67	1.224	48
5	Grimsby Town	42	17	11	14	78	60	1.300	45
6	Derby County	42	18	9	15	81	66	1.227	45

Source: World Football
Rules for classification: 1) Points; 2) Goal average; 3) Goals scored

=== Results summary ===
Overall								Home						Away					
Pld	W	D	L	GF	GA	GAv	Pts	W	D	L	GF	GA	Pts	W	D	L	GF	GA	Pts
42	20	8	14	82	67	1.224	48	13	5	3	53	25	31	7	3	11	29	42	17

=== Reports ===
Date	Opponents	H / A	Venue	Result F – A	Scorers	Attendance
25 August 1934	West Bromwich Albion	A	The Hawthorns	1 – 1	Barkas	24,480
29 August 1934	Liverpool	H	Maine Road	3 - 1	Bradshaw (og), Marshall, Brook	18,000
1 September 1934	Sheffield Wednesday	H	Maine Road	4 – 1	Herd (2), Marshall, Brook	50,000
5 September 1934	Liverpool	A	Anfield	1 – 2	Tilson	32,000
8 September 1934	Birmingham City	A	St Andrews	3 - 1	Tilson, Herd, Brook	20,000
15 September 1934	Stoke City	H	Maine Road	3 – 1	Tilson (3)	50,000
22 September 1934	Leicester City	A	Filbert Street	3 – 1	Herd (2), Busby	25,000
29 September 1934	Middlesbrough	A	Ayresome Park	2 - 1	Herd, Fletcher	9,180
6 October 1934	Blackburn Rovers	H	Maine Road	3 – 3	Brook (2), Heale	35,482
13 October 1934	Arsenal	A	Highbury	0 – 3		68,145
20 October 1934	Derby County	H	Maine Road	0 – 1		44,393
27 October 1934	Aston Villa	A	Villa Park	2 – 4	Herd, Tilson	27,000
3 November 1934	Tottenham Hotspur	H	Maine Road	3 – 1	McLuckie, Herd, Heale	28,802
10 November 1934	Sunderland	A	Victoria Ground	2 - 3	Brook (2)	9,000
17 November 1934	Huddersfield Town	H	Maine Road	0 – 0		36,176
24 November 1934	Everton	A	Goodison Park	2 – 1	Tilson, Heale	36,926
1 December 1934	Grimsby Town	H	Maine Road	1 – 0	Toseland	31,642
8 December 1934	Preston North End	A	Deepdale	4 – 2	Tilson (3), Brook	20,000
15 December 1934	Chelsea	H	Maine Road	2 – 0	Tilson, Heale	28,797
22 December 1934	Wolverhampton Wanderers	A	Molineux Stadium	0 – 5		27,204
25 December 1934	Leeds United	A	Elland Road	2 – 1	Toseland, Heale	24,810
26 December 1934	Leeds United	H	Maine Road	3 – 0	Heale (2), Brook	51,387
29 December 1934	West Bromwich Albion	H	Maine Road	3 – 2	Brook (2), Herd	23,545
5 January 1935	Sheffield Wednesday	A	Hillsborough Stadium	0 – 1		35,000
19 January 1935	Birmingham City	H	Maine Road	0 – 0		25,000
26 January 1935	Stoke City	A	Victoria Ground	0 – 2		25,000
2 February 1935	Leicester City	H	Maine Road	6 - 3	Brook (2), Bray, Toseland, Herd, Tilson	20,000
9 February 1935	Middlesbrough	H	Maine Road	6 – 2	Toseland, Tilson, Herd, Brook, (own goal x 2)	29,431
23 February 1935	Arsenal	H	Maine Road	1 – 1	Brook	79,491
2 March 1935	Derby County	A	Baseball Ground	2 – 1	Dellow, Herd	27,020
4 March 1935	Blackburn Rovers	A	Ewood Park	0 – 1		11,328
9 March 1935	Aston Villa	H	Maine Road	4 – 1	Dellow (2), Heale, Brook	25,000
16 March 1935	Tottenham Hotspur	A	White Hart Lane	0 – 0		43,572
30 March 1935	Huddersfield Town	A	Leeds Road	0 – 3		18,997
6 April 1935	Everton	H	Maine Road	2 – 2	Heale, Tilson	26,138
10 April 1935	Sunderland	H	Maine Road	1 – 0	Heale	18,000
13 April 1935	Grimsby Town	A	Blundell Park	1 – 1	Herd	13,394
19 April 1935	Portsmouth	H	Maine Road	2 – 4	Tilson (2)	35,000
20 April 1935	Preston North End	H	Maine Road	1 – 2	Herd	18,000
22 April 1935	Portsmouth	A	Fratton Park	2 – 4	Dellow, Tilson	17,000
27 April 1935	Chelsea	A	Stamford Bridge	2 – 4	Heale, Tilson	22,993
4 May 1935	Wolverhampton Wanderers	H	Maine Road	5 – 0	Heale (2), Marshall, Toseland, Brook	15,000

== FA Cup ==
=== Results ===
Date	Round	Opponents	H / A	Venue	Result F – A	Scorers	Attendance
12 January 1935	3rd Round	Tottenham Hotspur	A	White Hart Lane	0 - 1		48,983
