= 1931–32 Manchester City F.C. season =

English football club season

Manchester City
1931–32 season
- Manager: Peter Hodge (to 12 Mar 1932); Wilf Wild (from 14 Mar 1932)
- Stadium: Maine Road
- First Division: 14th
- FA Cup: Semi-finals
- Top goalscorer: League: David Halliday (28); All: David Halliday (32)
- Highest home attendance: 62,641 v Derby County (13 February 1932)
- Lowest home attendance: 15,000 v Sheffield Wednesday (30 April 1932)

The 1931–32 season was Manchester City's 37th season of competitive football and 25th season in the top division of English football. In addition to the First Division, the club competed in the FA Cup.

== First Division ==
=== League table ===
Pos	Team	Pld	W	D	L	GF	GA	GAv	Pts
12	Chelsea	42	16	8	18	69	73	0.945	40
13	Sunderland	42	15	10	17	67	73	0.918	40
14	Manchester City	42	13	12	17	83	73	1.137	38
15	Derby County	42	14	10	18	71	75	0.947	38
16	Blackburn Rovers	42	16	6	20	89	95	0.937	38

Source: World Football
Rules for classification: 1) Points; 2) Goal average; 3) Goals scored

=== Results summary ===
Overall								Home						Away					
Pld	W	D	L	GF	GA	GAv	Pts	W	D	L	GF	GA	Pts	W	D	L	GF	GA	Pts
42	13	12	17	83	73	1.137	38	10	5	6	49	30	25	3	7	11	34	43	13

=== Reports ===
Date	Opponents	H / A	Venue	Result F–A	Scorers	Attendance
29 August 1931	Sunderland	H	Maine Road	1–1	Marshall	40,000
2 September 1931	Derby County	A	Baseball Ground	1–2	Halliday	10,865
5 September 1931	Leicester City	A	Filbert Street	0–4		12,000
9 September 1931	Derby County	H	Maine Road	3–0	Halliday (3)	15,153
12 September 1931	Everton	A	Goodison Park	1–0		32,570
14 September 1931	West Bromwich Albion	A	The Hawthorns	1–1	Cowan	19,042
19 September 1931	Arsenal	H	Maine Road	1–3	Bray	47,756
23 September 1931	West Bromwich Albion	H	Maine Road	2–5	Cowan, Halliday	18,000
26 September 1931	Blackpool	A	Bloomfield Road	2–2	Wrightson, Watson (og)	25,031
3 October 1931	Sheffield United	H	Maine Road	1–1	Marshall	25,000
10 October 1931	Blackburn Rovers	A	Ewood Park	2–2	Halliday, Tilson	12,313
17 October 1931	West Ham United	H	Maine Road	0–1		18,000
24 October 1931	Newcastle United	A	St James’ Park	1–2	Marshall	20,000
31 October 1931	Huddersfield Town	H	Maine Road	3–0	Halliday (2), Marshall	21,332
7 November 1931	Middlesbrough	A	Ayresome Park	3–3	Toseland, Halliday, Tilson	9,142
14 November 1931	Grimsby Town	H	Maine Road	4–1	Halliday (2), Marshall, Brook	20,352
21 November 1931	Liverpool	A	Anfield	3–4	Marshall, Halliday, Tilson	30,000
28 November 1931	Aston Villa	H	Maine Road	3–3	Halliday (2), Tilson	30,000
5 December 1931	Chelsea	A	Stamford Bridge	2–3	Tilson, Toseland	27,509
12 December 1931	Bolton Wanderers	H	Maine Road	2–1	Halliday, Tilson	20,283
19 December 1931	Sheffield Wednesday	A	Hillsborough Stadium	1–1	Brook	10,000
26 December 1931	Portsmouth	A	Fratton Park	2–3	Halliday, Tilson	35,000
1 January 1932	Portsmouth	H	Maine Road	3–3	McMullan, Marshall, Gilfallen (og)	30,000
2 January 1932	Sunderland	A	Roker Park	5–2	Halliday (3), Rowley (2)	18,000
16 January 1932	Leicester City	H	Maine Road	5–1	Marshall (2), Halliday (2), Tilson	20,000
27 January 1932	Everton	H	Maine Road	1–0	Halliday	26,383
30 January 1932	Arsenal	A	Highbury	0–4		39,834
6 February 1932	Blackpool	H	Maine Road	7–1	Halliday (2), Brook (2), Toseland, Tilson, Cowan	24,739
15 February 1932	Sheffield United	A	Bramhall Lane	1–2	Rowley	10,000
20 February 1932	Blackburn Rovers	H	Maine Road	3–1	Marshall (2), Brook	24,438
2 March 1932	West Ham United	A	Maine Road	1–1	Busby	18,000
5 March 1932	Newcastle United	H	Maine Road	5–1	Tilson (2), Toseland, Marshall, Brook	28,322
19 March 1932	Middlesbrough	H	Maine Road	1–2	Tilson	24,144
26 March 1932	Grimsby Town	A	Blundell Park	1–2	Brook	11,481
28 March 1932	Birmingham City	H	Maine Road	2–1	Marshall, Brook	20,000
29 March 1932	Birmingham City	A	St Andrews	5–1	Halliday (3), Payne, Tilson	12,000
2 April 1932	Liverpool	H	Maine Road	0–1		20,000
6 April 1932	Huddersfield Town	A	Leeds Road	0–1		22,963
9 April 1932	Aston Villa	A	Villa Park	1–2	Brook	30,000
16 April 1932	Chelsea	H	Maine Road	1–1	Rowley	20,124
23 April 1932	Bolton Wanderers	A	Burnden Park	1–1	Halliday	18,680
30 April 1932	Sheffield Wednesday	H	Maine Road	1–2	Toseland	15,000

== FA Cup ==
=== Results ===
Date	Round	Opponents	H / A	Venue	Result F–A	Scorers	Attendance
9 January 1932	Third round	Millwall	A	The Den	2–3	Halliday (2), Toseland	32,091
23 January 1932	Fourth round	Brentford	H	Maine Road	6–1	Tilson (3), Brook (2), Halliday	56,190
13 February 1932	Fifth round	Derby County	H	Maine Road	3–0	Marshall (2), Brook	62,641
27 February 1932	Sixth round	Bury	A	Gigg Lane	4–3	Toseland (2), Halliday, Cowan	28,035
12 March 1932	Semi Final	Arsenal	N	Villa Park	0–1		50,337
