= 1935–36 Manchester City F.C. season =

English football club season

Manchester City
1935–36 season
- Manager: Wilf Wild
- Stadium: Maine Road
- First Division: 9th
- FA Cup: Fifth Round
- Top goalscorer: League: Eric Brook (14); All: Eric Brook (16)
- Highest home attendance: 65,978 v Luton Town (25 January 1936)
- Lowest home attendance: 12,498 v Blackburn Rovers (19 February 1936)

The 1935–36 season was Manchester City's 41st season of competitive football and 29th season in the top division of English football. In addition to the First Division, the club competed in the FA Cup.

== First Division ==
=== League table ===
Pos	Team	Pld	W	D	L	GF	GA	GAv	Pts
7	Preston North End	42	18	8	16	67	64	1.047	44
8	Chelsea	42	15	13	14	65	72	0.903	43
9	Manchester City	42	17	8	17	68	60	1.133	42
10	Portsmouth	42	17	8	17	54	67	0.806	42
11	Leeds United	42	15	11	16	66	64	1.031	41

Source: World Football
Rules for classification: 1) Points; 2) Goal average; 3) Goals scored

=== Results summary ===
Overall								Home						Away					
Pld	W	D	L	GF	GA	GAv	Pts	W	D	L	GF	GA	Pts	W	D	L	GF	GA	Pts
42	17	8	17	68	60	1.133	42	13	2	6	44	17	28	4	6	11	24	43	14

=== Reports ===
Date	Opponents	H / A	Venue	Result F – A	Scorers	Attendance
31 August 1935	West Bromwich Albion	H	Maine Road	1 – 1	Herd	38,826
4 September 1935	Liverpool	A	Anfield	2 - 0	Tilson, Brook	30,000
7 September 1935	Sunderland	A	Roker Park	0 – 2		45,000
11 September 1935	Liverpool	H	Maine Road	6 – 0	Toseland (2), Heale (2), Busby, Herd	25,000
14 September 1935	Birmingham City	H	Maine Road	3 - 1	Bray, Toseland, Tilson	30,000
21 September 1935	Arsenal	A	Highbury	3 – 2	Toseland, Herd, Tilson	61,250
28 September 1935	Portsmouth	H	Maine Road	0 – 0		40,000
5 October 1935	Stoke City	H	Maine Road	1 - 2	Heale	35,000
12 October 1935	Blackburn Rovers	A	Ewood Park	1 – 4	Toseland	21,416
19 October 1935	Preston North End	A	Deepdale	0 – 4		18,000
26 October 1935	Brentford	H	Maine Road	2 – 1	Marshall, Owen	25,000
2 November 1935	Derby County	A	Baseball Ground	0 – 3		28,776
9 November 1935	Everton	H	Maine Road	1 – 0	Herd	39,883
16 November 1935	Bolton Wanderers	A	Burnden Park	3 - 3	Brook (2), Tilson	42,110
23 November 1935	Sheffield Wednesday	H	Maine Road	3 – 0	Owen (2), McCullough	30,000
30 November 1935	Middlesbrough	A	Ayresome Park	0 – 2		19,438
7 December 1935	Aston Villa	H	Maine Road	5 – 0	Toseland (2), Tilson (2), Brook	35,000
14 December 1935	Wolverhampton Wanderers	A	Molineux Stadium	3 – 4	Tilson (2), Brook	20,960
25 December 1935	Chelsea	H	Maine Road	0 – 0		36,074
25 December 1935	Chelsea	A	Stamford Bridge	1 – 2	Herd	41,732
28 December 1935	West Bromwich Albion	A	The Hawthorns	1 – 5	McLeod	31,012
1 January 1936	Grimsby Town	H	Maine Road	0 – 3		32,470
4 January 1936	Sunderland	H	Maine Road	0 – 1		45,000
15 January 1936	Huddersfield Town	H	Maine Road	1 – 2	Brook	16,884
18 January 1936	Birmingham City	A	St Andrews	1 – 0	McLeod	20,000
1 February 1936	Portsmouth	A	Fratton Park	2 – 1	McLeod (2)	20,000
8 February 1936	Stoke City	A	Victoria Ground	0 - 1		30,000
19 February 1936	Blackburn Rovers	H	Maine Road	2 – 0	McLeod (2)	12,498
22 February 1936	Preston North End	H	Maine Road	1 – 3	Brook	39,364
29 February 1936	Everton	A	Goodison Park	2 – 2	Tilson, Toseland	14,418
7 March 1936	Middlesbrough	H	Maine Road	6 – 0	Herd (2), Toseland, Doherty, Brook, Tilson	20,094
11 March 1936	Arsenal	H	Maine Road	1 – 0	Percival	32,750
14 March 1936	Brentford	A	Griffin Park	0 – 0		35,000
21 March 1936	Bolton Wanderers	H	Maine Road	7 – 0	Brook (3), Doherty (2), Herd, Toseland	40,779
28 March 1936	Sheffield Wednesday	A	Hillsborough Stadium	0 – 1		22,000
4 April 1936	Derby County	H	Maine Road	1 – 0	McLeod	25,806
10 April 1936	Leeds United	H	Maine Road	1 – 3	McLeod	17,175
11 April 1936	Aston Villa	A	Villa Park	2 – 2	Marshall, Percival	42,000
13 April 1936	Leeds United	A	Elland Road	1 – 1	Brook	38,773
18 April 1936	Wolverhampton Wanderers	H	Maine Road	2 – 1	Herd, Tilson	21,852
25 April 1936	Huddersfield Town	A	Leeds Road	1 – 1	Doherty	8,258
2 May 1936	Grimsby Town	A	Blundell Park	1 - 3	Brook	8,974

== FA Cup ==
=== Reports ===
Date	Round	Opponents	H / A	Venue	Result F – A	Scorers	Attendance
11 January 1936	Third round	Portsmouth	H	Maine Road	3 - 1	Brook (3)	53,340
25 January 1936	Fourth round	Luton Town	H	Maine Road	2 – 1	Herd, McLeod	65,978
15 February 1936	Fifth round	Grimsby Town	A	Blundell Park	2 – 3	McLeod, Tilson	28,000
