= Bill Kinghorn =

Scottish footballer

William John D. Kinghorn (27 February 1912 – 1977) was a Scottish footballer who played as a midfielder.
