= Wilf Wild =

English footballer and manager

Personal information
- Date of birth: 1893
- Date of death: 12 December 1950 (aged 57)

Managerial career
- Years: Team
- 1932–1946: Manchester City
- 1947: Manchester City (caretaker)

Wilfred Wild (1893 – 12 December 1950) was a British football manager who served as manager of Manchester City from 1932 to 1946.

== Early life ==
Wild first joined Manchester City in 1920 as an assistant to Ernest Mangnall, primarily assisting in administrative matters. Mangnall held the position of secretary-manager, meaning he was responsible for both on-field and off-field matters. Mangnall left the club in 1924, and the role was separated into two areas. David Ashworth was appointed as manager, with the responsibility of selecting the team and coaching, and Wild was appointed as secretary, taking responsibility for administration. Wild remained in this position until 1932, when the manager's position became vacant due to Peter Hodge leaving to become Leicester City manager. Wild took on the managerial role in addition to his existing secretarial duties.

== Managerial career ==
In Wild's first season in charge Manchester City reached the 1933 FA Cup final, but lost 3–0 to a Dixie Dean inspired Everton. The following season Wild again led City to the final, this time emerging as 2–1 winners against Portsmouth. The 1933–34 season also saw Wild hand a debut to Frank Swift, who became the club's first choice goalkeeper for the next 16 years. The FA Cup success was accompanied by a fifth place League finish, and the two subsequent seasons also resulted in top half finishes.

The consistency of the preceding seasons was built upon in 1936–37, though the season had an indifferent start in which the team won two of their opening ten matches. By the Christmas results had improved, and in the second half of the season Wild's side embarked on a remarkable unbeaten run, going without defeat in the 22 matches between 26 December and the end of the season. On 10 April City faced Arsenal, the dominant team of the 1930s, and won 2–0 to confirm their position as contenders for the championship. A fortnight later City claimed a seventh consecutive win, beating Sheffield Wednesday 4–1, and became champions of England for the first time.

The 1937–38 season was a marked departure from Wild's previous success. Despite playing an attacking style of football which resulted in City scoring more goals than any other club in the division, the season ended in relegation, the only time the reigning English champions have been relegated. Despite this setback Wild remained as manager, and the following season the club finished fifth in the Second Division. League football was then suspended following the outbreak of the Second World War. When competitive football resumed in 1946, Wild wished to step down as manager. On 2 December Sam Cowan was appointed manager and Wild returned to his former position as secretary. Following Sam Cowan’s departure at the end of the 1946-47 season, Wild returned as caretaker manager for the start of the 1947-48 season whilst the club searched for a new manager. His fifteen years in charge made him the longest serving manager in the club's history.

== Later years ==
He remained club secretary until his death in 1950.

== Managerial statistics ==
Managerial record by team and tenure
Team	From	To	Record				
Team	From	To	P	W	D	L	Win %
Manchester City	14 March 1932	1 December 1946	352	158	71	123	44.9
Manchester City	August 1947	November 1947	16	5	5	6	31.3

== Honours ==
Manchester City

- FA Cup: 1933–34
- Football League First Division: 1936–37
- FA Community Shield: 1937

== See also ==
- List of English football championship winning managers
