= 1951–52 Liverpool F.C. season =

English football club season

Liverpool
1951–52 season
- Manager: Don Welsh
- First Division: 11th
- FA Cup: Fifth round
- Top goalscorer: League: Billy Liddell (19); All: Billy Liddell (19)
- Highest home attendance: 61,905 (v Wolverhampton Wanderers, FA Cup 2 February)
- Lowest home attendance: 19,470 (v Stoke City, League, 5 April)
- Average home league attendance: 40,172
Home colours	Away colours

The 1951–52 season was the 60th season in Liverpool F.C.'s, and the club finished eleventh in the table.

In the FA Cup, a ground record of 61,905 watched the fourth round FA Cup match versus Wolverhampton Wanderers. The club was eliminated from the FA Cup in the following round after losing to Burnley.

== Goalkeepers ==
- (England) Charlie Ashcroft
- (England) Russell Crossley

== Defenders ==
- (Scotland) Joe Cadden
- (England) John Heydon
- (England) Laurie Hughes
- (England) Bill Jones
- (Wales) Ray Lambert
- (England) Bob Paisley
- (England) Steve Parr
- (England) Bill Shepherd
- (England) Eddie Spicer
- (England) Phil Taylor
- (England) George Whitworth

== Midfielders ==
- (England) Ken Brierley
- (England) Brian Jackson
- (Scotland) Billy Liddell
- (England) Jimmy Payne
- (England) Jack Smith
- (England) Bryan Williams
- (England) Don Woan

== Forwards ==
- (England) Jack Balmer
- (England) Kevin Baron
- (England) Louis Bimpson
- (England) Cyril Done
- (Scotland) Willie Fagan
- (England) Jack Haigh
- (Wales) Mervyn Jones
- (England) Albert Stubbins

== Squad statistics ==
=== Appearances and goals ===
No.	Pos	Nat	Player	Total		Division 1		FA Cup	
No.	Pos	Nat	Player	Apps	Goals	Apps	Goals	Apps	Goals
	GK	(England) ENG	Charlie Ashcroft	35	0	34	0	1	0
	FW	(England) ENG	Jack Balmer	4	0	2	0	2	0
	FW	(England) ENG	Kevin Baron	41	6	40	6	1	0
	MF	(England) ENG	Ken Brierley	11	1	11	1	0	0
	DF	(Scotland) SCO	Joe Cadden	1	0	0	0	1	0
	GK	(England) ENG	Russell Crossley	10	0	8	0	2	0
	FW	(England) ENG	Cyril Done	12	4	10	3	2	1
	FW	(Scotland) SCO	Willie Fagan	3	0	3	0	0	0
	FW	(England) ENG	Jack Haigh	3	0	3	0	0	0
	MF	(England) ENG	John Heydon	29	0	27	0	2	0
	DF	(England) ENG	Laurie Hughes	26	1	25	1	1	0
	MF	(England) ENG	Brian Jackson	15	1	14	1	1	0
	FW	(Wales) WAL	Mervyn Jones	3	0	3	0	0	0
	DF	(England) ENG	Bill Jones	40	3	37	3	3	0
	DF	(Wales) WAL	Ray Lambert	35	0	32	0	3	0
	MF	(Scotland) SCO	Billy Liddell	43	19	40	19	3	0
	DF	(England) ENG	Bob Paisley	40	3	37	2	3	1
	DF	(England) ENG	Steve Parr	16	0	16	0	0	0
	MF	(England) ENG	Jimmy Payne	38	10	35	9	3	1
	DF	(England) ENG	Bill Shepherd	1	0	1	0	0	0
	MF	(England) ENG	Jack Smith	28	6	27	6	1	0
	FW	(England) ENG	Albert Stubbins	13	5	13	5	0	0
	DF	(England) ENG	Phil Taylor	26	1	24	1	2	0
	DF	(England) ENG	George Whitworth	9	0	9	0	0	0
	MF	(England) ENG	Bryan Williams	13	1	11	1	2	0

== Table ==
Pos	Team	Pld	W	D	L	GF	GA	GAv	Pts
9	Blackpool	42	18	9	15	64	64	1.000	45
10	Charlton Athletic	42	17	10	15	68	63	1.079	44
11	Liverpool	42	12	19	11	57	61	0.934	43
12	Sunderland	42	15	12	15	70	61	1.148	42
13	West Bromwich Albion	42	14	13	15	74	77	0.961	41

Source: World Football
Rules for classification: 1) Points; 2) Goal average; 3) Goals scored

== Results ==
=== First Division ===
Date	Opponents	Venue	Result	Scorers	Attendance	Report 1	Report 2
18-Aug-51	Portsmouth	H	0–2		42,270	Report	Report
21-Aug-51	Burnley	A	0–0		25,162	Report	Report
25-Aug-51	Chelsea	A	3–1	Baron 19' Liddell 50' Stubbins 63'	44,055	Report	Report
29-Aug-51	Burnley	H	3–1	Stubbins 12' Done 44' Liddell 86'	32,857	Report	Report
01-Sep-51	Huddersfield Town	H	2–1	Liddell Baron 71'	39,818	Report	Report
05-Sep-51	Arsenal	A	0–0		47,483	Report	Report
08-Sep-51	Wolverhampton Wanderers	A	1–2	Brierley 64'	35,723	Report	Report
12-Sep-51	Arsenal	H	0–0		39,853	Report	Report
15-Sep-51	Sunderland	H	2–2	Liddell 19' Baron 29'	37,381	Report	Report
22-Sep-51	Aston Villa	A	0–2		47,056	Report	Report
29-Sep-51	Derby County	H	2–0	Smith 18' Williams 63'	40,259	Report	Report
06-Oct-51	Charlton Athletic	A	0–2		31,991	Report	Report
13-Oct-51	Fulham	H	4–0	Smith 18' Payne 22', 85' Liddell 66'	36,793	Report	Report
20-Oct-51	Middlesbrough	A	3–3	Liddell 60' Smith 69' Jones 88'	26,126	Report	Report
27-Oct-51	West Bromwich Albion	H	2–5	Payne 25' Liddell (pen 42)	34,891	Report	Report
03-Nov-51	Newcastle United	A	1–1	Payne 83'	50,132	Report	Report
10-Nov-51	Bolton Wanderers	H	1–1	Jackson 61'	49,537	Report	Report
17-Nov-51	Stoke City	A	2–1	Baron 39' Payne 62'	23,680	Report	Report
24-Nov-51	Manchester United	H	0–0		42,378	Report	Report
01-Dec-51	Tottenham Hotspur	A	3–2	Liddell 10', 17' (pen 71)	51,342	Report	Report
08-Dec-51	Preston North End	H	2–2	Liddell 65' Hughes 88'	34,722	Report	Report
15-Dec-51	Portsmouth	A	3–1	Liddell 17', 87' Smith 32'	29,935	Report	Report
22-Dec-51	Chelsea	H	1–1	Liddell 31'	26,459	Report	Report
25-Dec-51	Blackpool	H	1–1	Payne	41,198	Report	Report
26-Dec-51	Blackpool	A	0–2		27,414	Report	Report
29-Dec-51	Huddersfield Town	A	2–1	Liddell 42' Payne 76'	25,500	Report	Report
05-Jan-52	Wolverhampton Wanderers	H	1–1	Taylor 76'	44,768	Report	Report
19-Jan-52	Sunderland	A	0–3		33,549	Report	Report
26-Jan-52	Aston Villa	H	1–2	Liddell 31'	39,774	Report	Report
09-Feb-52	Derby County	A	1–1	Done 86'	22,495	Report	Report
16-Feb-52	Charlton Athletic	H	1–1	Done 20'	33,487	Report	Report
01-Mar-52	Fulham	A	1–1	Payne 16'	36,757	Report	Report
08-Mar-52	Middlesbrough	H	1–1	Jones 82'	41,945	Report	Report
15-Mar-52	West Bromwich Albion	A	3–3	Liddell 62' Paisley 63' Stubbins 64'	27,033	Report	Report
22-Mar-52	Newcastle United	H	3–0	Smith Stubbins 53', 60'	48,966	Report	Report
29-Mar-52	Bolton Wanderers	A	1–1	Liddell 19'	17,459	Report	Report
05-Apr-52	Stoke City	H	2–1	Paisley Baron 82'	19,740	Report	Report
11-Apr-52	Manchester City	A	2–1	Baron 17' Payne 19'	35,396	Report	Report
12-Apr-52	Manchester United	A	0–4		44,899	Report	Report
14-Apr-52	Manchester City	H	1–2	Smith 45'	34,404	Report	Report
19-Apr-52	Tottenham Hotspur	H	1–1	Liddell 82'	36,898	Report	Report
26-Apr-52	Preston North End	A	0–4		28,638	Report	Report

=== FA Cup ===
Date	Opponents	Venue	Result	Scorers	Attendance	Report 1	Report 2
12-Jan-52	Workington	H	1–0	Payne 76'	52,581	Report	Report
02-Feb-52	Wolverhampton Wanderers	H	2–1	Paisley 5' Done 9'	61,905	Report	Report
23-Feb-52	Burnley	A	0–2		54,031	Report	Report
