= 1952–53 Liverpool F.C. season =

English football club season

Liverpool
1952–53 season
- Manager: Don Welsh
- First Division: 17th
- FA Cup: Third round
- Top goalscorer: League: Billy Liddell (13); All: Billy Liddell (13)
- Highest home attendance: 52,079 (v Cardiff City, League, 3 April)
- Lowest home attendance: 23,204 (v Charlton Athletic, League, 28 March)
- Average home league attendance: 40,172
Home colours	Away colours

The 1952–53 season was the 61st season in Liverpool F.C.'s existence, and the club finished seventeenth in the table. Liverpool were knocked out by Gateshead F.C. in the FA Cup.

== Goalkeepers ==
- (England) Charlie Ashcroft
- (England) Russell Crossley

== Defenders ==
- (South Africa) Hugh Gerhardi
- (England) John Heydon
- (England) Laurie Hughes
- (England) Bill Jones
- (Wales) Ray Lambert
- (England) Joseph Maloney
- (England) Ronnie Moran
- (England) Bob Paisley
- (England) Steve Parr
- (England) Eddie Spicer
- (England) Phil Taylor
- (England) George Whitworth

== Midfielders ==
- (England) Alan A'Court
- (England) Ken Brierley
- (England) Brian Jackson
- (Scotland) Billy Liddell
- (England) Jimmy Payne
- (England) Roy Saunders
- (England) Jack Smith
- (England) Bryan Williams

== Forwards ==
- (England) Eric Anderson
- (England) Kevin Baron
- (England) Louis Bimpson
- (Wales) Mervyn Jones
- (England) Arthur Rowley
- (Northern Ireland) Sammy Smyth
- (England) Albert Stubbins

== Squad statistics ==
=== Appearances and goals ===
No.	Pos	Nat	Player	Total		Division 1		FA Cup	
No.	Pos	Nat	Player	Apps	Goals	Apps	Goals	Apps	Goals
	MF	(England) ENG	Alan A'Court	12	2	12	2	0	0
	FW	(England) ENG	Eric Anderson	1	0	1	0	0	0
	GK	(England) ENG	Charlie Ashcroft	24	0	24	0	0	0
	FW	(England) ENG	Kevin Baron	28	9	27	9	1	0
	FW	(England) ENG	Louis Bimpson	8	3	8	3	0	0
	MF	(England) ENG	Ken Brierley	10	1	10	1	0	0
	GK	(England) ENG	Russell Crossley	19	0	18	0	1	0
	DF	(South Africa) RSA	Hugh Gerhardi	6	0	6	0	0	0
	MF	(England) ENG	John Heydon	24	0	23	0	1	0
	DF	(England) ENG	Laurie Hughes	11	0	11	0	0	0
	MF	(England) ENG	Brian Jackson	5	0	5	0	0	0
	FW	(Wales) WAL	Mervyn Jones	2	0	1	0	1	0
	DF	(England) ENG	Bill Jones	27	2	26	2	1	0
	DF	(Wales) WAL	Ray Lambert	37	0	36	0	1	0
	MF	(Scotland) SCO	Billy Liddell	40	13	39	13	1	0
	DF	(England) ENG	Joe Maloney	6	0	6	0	0	0
	DF	(England) ENG	Ronnie Moran	12	0	11	0	1	0
	DF	(England) ENG	Bob Paisley	26	2	26	2	0	0
	DF	(England) ENG	Steve Parr	4	0	4	0	0	0
	MF	(England) ENG	Jimmy Payne	33	8	33	8	0	0
	FW	(England) ENG	Arthur Rowley	11	0	11	0	0	0
	MF	(England) ENG	Roy Saunders	14	0	13	0	1	0
	MF	(England) ENG	Jack Smith	28	8	27	8	1	0
	FW	(Northern Ireland) NIR	Sammy Smyth	19	7	19	7	0	0
	DF	(England) ENG	Eddie Spicer	28	0	28	0	0	0
	FW	(England) ENG	Albert Stubbins	5	0	5	0	0	0
	DF	(England) ENG	Phil Taylor	21	2	21	2	0	0
	MF	(England) ENG	Bryan Williams	12	4	11	4	1	0

== Table ==
Pos	Team	Pld	W	D	L	GF	GA	GAv	Pts
15	Portsmouth	42	14	10	18	74	83	0.892	38
16	Newcastle United	42	14	9	19	59	70	0.843	37
17	Liverpool	42	14	8	20	61	82	0.744	36
18	Sheffield Wednesday	42	12	11	19	62	72	0.861	35
19	Chelsea	42	12	11	19	56	66	0.848	35

Source: World Football
Rules for classification: 1) Points; 2) Goal average; 3) Goals scored

== Results ==
=== First Division ===
Date	Opponents	Venue	Result	Scorers	Attendance	Report 1	Report 2
23-Aug-52	Preston North End	A	1–1	Smith 41'	38,000	Report	Report
27-Aug-52	Sheffield Wednesday	H	1–0	Baron 88'	46,614	Report	Report
30-Aug-52	Stoke City	H	3–2	Smith 28' Baron 36' Liddell 70'	40,062	Report	Report
03-Sep-52	Sheffield Wednesday	A	2–0	Baron 41' Liddell 56'	41,183	Report	Report
06-Sep-52	Manchester City	A	2–0	Baron 5' Smith 8'	42,965	Report	Report
10-Sep-52	Tottenham Hotspur	H	2–1	Smith 61' Liddell pen 75'	49,809	Report	Report
13-Sep-52	Portsmouth	H	1–1	Williams 9'	49,771	Report	Report
15-Sep-52	Tottenham Hotspur	A	1–3	Williams 30'	37,331	Report	Report
20-Sep-52	Middlesbrough	H	4–1	Payne 8' Smith 25' Williams 27' Baron 52'	40,715	Report	Report
27-Sep-52	West Bromwich Albion	A	0–3		33,774	Report	Report
04-Oct-52	Newcastle United	H	5–3	Liddell 9' Smith 36', 69' Baron 47' Paisley 77'	48,002	Report	Report
11-Oct-52	Bolton Wanderers	A	2–2	Baron 30' Payne 34'	35,251	Report	Report
18-Oct-52	Aston Villa	H	0–2		42,573	Report	Report
25-Oct-52	Sunderland	A	1–3	Liddell 65'	50,555	Report	Report
01-Nov-52	Wolverhampton Wanderers	H	2–1	Payne 3' Liddell 48'	46,487	Report	Report
08-Nov-52	Charlton Athletic	A	2–3	Williams 70' Brierley 83'	30,000	Report	Report
15-Nov-52	Arsenal	H	1–5	Payne 5'	45,010	Report	Report
22-Nov-52	Derby County	A	2–3	Liddell pen 60' Smith 79'	20,758	Report	Report
29-Nov-52	Blackpool	H	2–2	Payne 18', 25'	32,336	Report	Report
13-Dec-52	Manchester United	H	1–2	Liddell 10'	34,450	Report	Report
20-Dec-52	Preston North End	H	2–2	Liddell 33' Baron 44'	27,659	Report	Report
25-Dec-52	Burnley	A	0–2		35,858	Report	Report
26-Dec-52	Burnley	H	1–1	Liddell pen 30'	46,589	Report	Report
03-Jan-53	Stoke City	A	1–3	Baron 8'	25,000	Report	Report
17-Jan-53	Manchester City	H	0–1		41,191	Report	Report
24-Jan-53	Portsmouth	A	1–3	Paisley 66'	27,045	Report	Report
07-Feb-53	Middlesbrough	A	3–2	Liddell 20' Smyth 22' Taylor 68'	30,000	Report	Report
14-Feb-53	West Bromwich Albion	H	3–0	Liddell 30' Payne 46' Smyth 47'	24,890	Report	Report
21-Feb-53	Newcastle United	A	2–1	Smyth 15' Taylor 17'	35,000	Report	Report
04-Mar-53	Bolton Wanderers	H	0–0		30,000	Report	Report
07-Mar-53	Aston Villa	A	0–4		30,000	Report	Report
14-Mar-53	Sunderland	H	2–0	Smyth 13' A'Court 39'	40,409	Report	Report
21-Mar-53	Wolverhampton Wanderers	A	0–3		30,000	Report	Report
23-Mar-53	Chelsea	A	0–3		40,000	Report	Report
28-Mar-53	Charlton Athletic	H	1–2	Payne	23,204	Report	Report
03-Apr-53	Cardiff City	H	2–1	Jones 4' Bimpson 19'	52,079	Report	Report
04-Apr-53	Arsenal	A	3–5	Bimpson 75' A'Court 77' Liddell 87'	40,564	Report	Report
06-Apr-53	Cardiff City	A	0–4		20,000	Report	Report
11-Apr-53	Derby County	H	1–1	Smyth 59'	34,064	Report	Report
18-Apr-53	Blackpool	A	1–3	Smyth 73'	22,073	Report	Report
20-Apr-53	Manchester United	A	1–3	Smyth 88'	20,869	Report	Report
25-Apr-53	Chelsea	H	2–0	Jones 33' Bimpson 82'	47,699	Report	Report

=== FA Cup ===
Date	Opponents	Venue	Result	Scorers	Attendance	Report 1	Report 2
10-Jan-53	Gateshead	A	0–1		15,193	Report	Report
