= 1950–51 Liverpool F.C. season =

English football club season

Liverpool
1950–51 season
- Manager: George Kay (to 30 January 1951); Don Welsh (from 5 March 1951)
- First Division: 9th
- FA Cup: Third round
- Top goalscorer: League: Billy Liddell (15); All: Billy Liddell (15)
- Highest home attendance: 54,121 (v Blackpool, League 26 December)
- Lowest home attendance: 27,915 (v Huddersfield Town, League, 31 March)
- Average home league attendance: 38,294
Home colours	Away colours

The 1950–51 season was the 59th season in Liverpool F.C.'s existence, and ended with the club finishing ninth in the table.

== Goalkeepers ==
- (England) Charlie Ashcroft
- (England) Russell Crossley
- (Wales) Cyril Sidlow

== Defenders ==
- (Scotland) Joe Cadden
- (England) John Heydon
- (England) Laurie Hughes
- (England) Bill Jones
- (Wales) Ray Lambert
- (England) Bob Paisley
- (England) Bill Shepherd
- (England) Eddie Spicer
- (England) Phil Taylor

== Midfielders ==
- (England) Ken Brierley
- (Scotland) Billy Liddell
- (England) Jimmy Payne
- (England) Bryan Williams
- (England) Don Woan

== Forwards ==
- (England) Jack Balmer
- (England) Kevin Baron
- (England) Cyril Done
- (Scotland) Willie Fagan
- (England) Jack Haigh
- (England) Albert Stubbins

== Squad statistics ==
=== Appearances and goals ===
No.	Pos	Nat	Player	Total		Division 1		FA Cup	
No.	Pos	Nat	Player	Apps	Goals	Apps	Goals	Apps	Goals
	GK	(England) ENG	Charlie Ashcroft	7	0	7	0	0	0
	FW	(England) ENG	Jack Balmer	35	11	34	10	1	1
	FW	(England) ENG	Kevin Baron	7	1	7	1	0	0
	MF	(England) ENG	Ken Brierley	5	0	5	0	0	0
	DF	(Scotland) SCO	Joe Cadden	4	0	4	0	0	0
	GK	(England) ENG	Russell Crossley	25	0	24	0	1	0
	FW	(England) ENG	Cyril Done	25	3	24	3	1	0
	FW	(Scotland) SCO	Willie Fagan	4	0	4	0	0	0
	FW	(England) ENG	Jack Haigh	8	3	8	3	0	0
	MF	(England) ENG	John Heydon	14	0	13	0	1	0
	DF	(England) ENG	Laurie Hughes	24	0	24	0	0	0
	DF	(England) ENG	Bill Jones	39	4	38	4	1	0
	DF	(Wales) WAL	Ray Lambert	35	0	34	0	1	0
	MF	(Scotland) SCO	Billy Liddell	36	15	35	15	1	0
	DF	(England) ENG	Bob Paisley	42	1	41	1	1	0
	MF	(England) ENG	Jimmy Payne	39	6	38	6	1	0
	DF	(England) ENG	Bill Shepherd	5	0	5	0	0	0
	GK	(Wales) WAL	Cyril Sidlow	11	0	11	0	0	0
	DF	(England) ENG	Eddie Spicer	43	0	42	0	1	0
	FW	(England) ENG	Albert Stubbins	24	6	23	6	1	0
	DF	(England) ENG	Phil Taylor	36	2	36	2	0	0
	MF	(England) ENG	Bryan Williams	3	0	3	0	0	0
	MF	(England) ENG	Don Woan	2	0	2	0	0	0

== Table ==
Pos	Team	Pld	W	D	L	GF	GA	GAv	Pts
7	Portsmouth	42	16	15	11	71	68	1.044	47
8	Bolton Wanderers	42	19	7	16	64	61	1.049	45
9	Liverpool	42	16	11	15	53	59	0.898	43
10	Burnley	42	14	14	14	48	43	1.116	42
11	Derby County	42	16	8	18	81	75	1.080	40

Source: World Football
Rules for classification: 1) Points; 2) Goal average; 3) Goals scored

== Results ==
=== First Division ===
Date	Opponents	Venue	Result	Scorers	Attendance	Report 1	Report 2
19-Aug-50	Wolverhampton Wanderers	A	0–2		50,622	Report	Report
23-Aug-50	Manchester United	H	2–1	Liddell 12' Own goal 37'	30,211	Report	Report
26-Aug-50	Sunderland	H	4–0	Liddell 14', 15' Stubbins 32', 90'	52,080	Report	Report
30-Aug-50	Manchester United	A	0–1		36,654	Report	Report
02-Sep-50	Aston Villa	A	1–1	Balmer 26'	45,127	Report	Report
06-Sep-50	Tottenham Hotspur	H	2–1	Balmer Stubbins 6'	39,015	Report	Report
09-Sep-50	Derby County	H	1–0	Done 85'	50,079	Report	Report
16-Sep-50	Everton	A	3–1	Stubbins 28' Balmer 40', 45'	71,150	Report	Report
23-Sep-50	Fulham	A	1–2	Liddell 4'	42,954	Report	Report
30-Sep-50	Bolton Wanderers	H	3–3	Payne 12' Balmer	44,534	Report	Report
07-Oct-50	Stoke City	H	0–0		40,239	Report	Report
14-Oct-50	West Bromwich Albion	A	1–1	Taylor 87'	35,030	Report	Report
21-Oct-50	Middlesbrough	H	0–0		47,426	Report	Report
28-Oct-50	Sheffield Wednesday	A	1–4	Payne 35'	43,711	Report	Report
04-Nov-50	Newcastle United	H	2–4	Liddell pen 31' Payne 65'	48,810	Report	Report
11-Nov-50	Huddersfield Town	A	2–2	Liddell 5' Taylor 88'	25,229	Report	Report
18-Nov-50	Arsenal	H	1–3	Own goal 78'	44,193	Report	Report
25-Nov-50	Burnley	A	1–1	Baron 12'	31,901	Report	Report
02-Dec-50	Chelsea	H	1–0	Liddell 71'	28,717	Report	Report
09-Dec-50	Portsmouth	A	3–1	Payne 31', 57' Balmer 83'	29,480	Report	Report
16-Dec-50	Wolverhampton Wanderers	H	1–4	Liddell pen 63'	30,959	Report	Report
23-Dec-50	Sunderland	A	1–2	Balmer 12'	30,150	Report	Report
25-Dec-50	Blackpool	A	0–3		31,867	Report	Report
26-Dec-50	Blackpool	H	1–0	Balmer 26'	54,121	Report	Report
13-Jan-51	Derby County	A	2–1	Haigh 8' Liddell 80'	21,849	Report	Report
20-Jan-51	Everton	H	0–2		48,688	Report	Report
27-Jan-51	Charlton Athletic	A	0–1		25,313	Report	Report
03-Feb-51	Fulham	H	2–0	Jones 1' Liddell 71'	33,330	Report	Report
10-Feb-51	Portsmouth	H	2–1	Jones 65' Balmer	36,958	Report	Report
17-Feb-51	Bolton Wanderers	A	1–2	Liddell 84'	34,807	Report	Report
24-Feb-51	Stoke City	A	3–2	Done 48' Jones 54' Liddell 65'	22,534	Report	Report
03-Mar-51	West Bromwich Albion	H	1–1	Paisley	36,654	Report	Report
10-Mar-51	Middlesbrough	A	1–1	Liddell 87'	29,247	Report	Report
17-Mar-51	Sheffield Wednesday	H	2–1	Liddell 45', pen 55'	31,413	Report	Report
23-Mar-51	Charlton Athletic	H	1–0	Haigh 15'	31,650	Report	Report
24-Mar-51	Newcastle United	A	1–1	Done 7'	45,535	Report	Report
31-Mar-51	Huddersfield Town	H	1–4	Haigh 87'	27,915	Report	Report
07-Apr-51	Arsenal	A	2–1	Stubbins 12' Payne 57'	34,664	Report	Report
14-Apr-51	Burnley	H	1–0	Jones 43'	24,118	Report	Report
21-Apr-51	Chelsea	A	0–1		30,134	Report	Report
25-Apr-51	Aston Villa	H	0–0		23,061	Report	Report
05-May-51	Tottenham Hotspur	A	1–3	Stubbins 85'	49,072	Report	Report

=== FA Cup ===
Date	Opponents	Venue	Result	Scorers	Attendance	Report 1	Report 2
06-Jan-51	Norwich City	A	1–3	Balmer 87'	34,693	Report	Report
