= 1947–48 Liverpool F.C. season =

English football club season

Liverpool
1947–48 season
- Manager: George Kay
- First Division: 11th
- FA Cup: Fourth round
- Top goalscorer: League: Albert Stubbins (24); All: Albert Stubbins (26)
- Highest home attendance: 56,074 (v Burnley, League, 6 September)
- Lowest home attendance: 23,097 (v Portsmouth, League, 31 January)
- Average home league attendance: 44,496
| Home colours | Away colours |

The 1947–48 season was the 56th season in Liverpool F.C.'s existence, and ended with the club finishing eleventh in the table.

== Goalkeepers ==
- (England) Charlie Ashcroft
- (England) Ray Minshull
- (Wales) Cyril Sidlow

== Defenders ==
- (Scotland) Jim Harley
- (England) Laurie Hughes
- (England) Bill Jones
- (Wales) Ray Lambert
- (England) Bob Paisley
- (England) Stan Palk
- (England) Bernard Ramsden
- (England) Bill Shepherd
- (Scotland) Sam Shields
- (England) Eddie Spicer
- (England) Phil Taylor

== Midfielders ==
- (England) Ken Brierley
- (England) Harry Eastham
- (Scotland) Billy Liddell
- (Scotland) Doug McAvoy
- (Scotland) Alex Muir
- (England) Jimmy Payne
- (South Africa) Robert Priday
- (England) Billy Watkinson
- (England) Bryan Williams

== Forwards ==
- (England) Jack Balmer
- (England) Kevin Baron
- (England) Len Carney
- (England) Cyril Done
- (Scotland) Willie Fagan
- (England) Les Shannon
- (England) Albert Stubbins

== Squad statistics ==
=== Appearances and goals ===
| No. | Pos | Nat | Player | Total | | Division 1 | | FA Cup | |
| No. | Pos | Nat | Player | Apps | Goals | Apps | Goals | Apps | Goals |
|---|---|---|---|---|---|---|---|---|---|
| | FW | (England) ENG | Jack Balmer | 41 | 15 | 40 | 15 | 1 | 0 |
| | FW | (England) ENG | Kevin Baron | 6 | 2 | 6 | 2 | 0 | 0 |
| | MF | (England) ENG | Ken Brierley | 10 | 1 | 10 | 1 | 0 | 0 |
| | FW | (England) ENG | Len Carney | 4 | 0 | 4 | 0 | 0 | 0 |
| | FW | (England) ENG | Cyril Done | 6 | 0 | 4 | 0 | 2 | 0 |
| | FW | (Scotland) SCO | Willie Fagan | 15 | 5 | 15 | 5 | 0 | 0 |
| | DF | (Scotland) SCO | Jim Harley | 21 | 0 | 21 | 0 | 0 | 0 |
| | DF | (England) ENG | Laurie Hughes | 34 | 0 | 32 | 0 | 2 | 0 |
| | DF | (England) ENG | Bill Jones | 43 | 1 | 41 | 1 | 2 | 0 |
| | DF | (Wales) WAL | Ray Lambert | 32 | 0 | 30 | 0 | 2 | 0 |
| | MF | (Scotland) SCO | Billy Liddell | 39 | 11 | 37 | 10 | 2 | 1 |
| | FW | (Scotland) SCO | Doug McAvoy | 1 | 0 | 1 | 0 | 0 | 0 |
| | GK | (England) ENG | Ray Minshull | 15 | 0 | 13 | 0 | 2 | 0 |
| | MF | (Scotland) SCO | Alex Muir | 4 | 0 | 4 | 0 | 0 | 0 |
| | DF | (England) ENG | Bob Paisley | 39 | 1 | 37 | 1 | 2 | 0 |
| | DF | (England) ENG | Stan Palk | 7 | 0 | 7 | 0 | 0 | 0 |
| | MF | (South Africa) RSA | Bob Priday | 23 | 5 | 21 | 4 | 2 | 1 |
| | DF | (England) ENG | Barney Ramsden | 10 | 0 | 10 | 0 | 0 | 0 |
| | FW | (England) ENG | Les Shannon | 1 | 0 | 1 | 0 | 0 | 0 |
| | GK | (Wales) WAL | Cyril Sidlow | 29 | 0 | 29 | 0 | 0 | 0 |
| | DF | (England) ENG | Eddie Spicer | 15 | 2 | 14 | 2 | 1 | 0 |
| | FW | (England) ENG | Albert Stubbins | 42 | 26 | 40 | 24 | 2 | 2 |
| | DF | (England) ENG | Phil Taylor | 36 | 0 | 34 | 0 | 2 | 0 |
| | MF | (England) ENG | Billy Watkinson | 11 | 0 | 11 | 0 | 0 | 0 |

== Table ==
| Pos | Team | Pld | W | D | L | GF | GA | GAv | Pts |
|---|---|---|---|---|---|---|---|---|---|
| 9 | Blackpool | 42 | 17 | 10 | 15 | 57 | 41 | 1.390 | 44 |
| 10 | Manchester City | 42 | 15 | 12 | 15 | 52 | 47 | 1.106 | 42 |
| 11 | Liverpool | 42 | 16 | 10 | 16 | 65 | 61 | 1.066 | 42 |
| 12 | Sheffield United | 42 | 16 | 10 | 16 | 65 | 70 | 0.929 | 42 |
| 13 | Charlton Athletic | 42 | 17 | 6 | 19 | 57 | 66 | 0.864 | 40 |

Source: World Football
Rules for classification: 1) Points; 2) Goal average; 3) Goals scored

== Results ==
=== First Division ===
| Date | Opponents | Venue | Result | Scorers | Attendance | Report 1 | Report 2 |
|---|---|---|---|---|---|---|---|
| 23-Aug-47 | Preston North End | H | 3–1 | Liddell 57' Stubbins 64', 68' | 49,000 | Report | Report |
| 27-Aug-47 | Manchester United | A | 0–2 | | 53,610 | Report | Report |
| 30-Aug-47 | Stoke City | A | 2–0 | Liddell 30', 34' | 37,558 | Report | Report |
| 03-Sep-47 | Manchester United | H | 2–2 | Stubbins 48' Balmer (pen 67) | 48,081 | Report | Report |
| 06-Sep-47 | Burnley | H | 1–1 | Balmer 32' | 56,074 | Report | Report |
| 08-Sep-47 | Sheffield United | A | 1–3 | Stubbins 80' | 35,071 | Report | Report |
| 13-Sep-47 | Portsmouth | A | 0–1 | | 33,479 | Report | Report |
| 17-Sep-47 | Charlton Athletic | A | 0–2 | | 24,424 | Report | Report |
| 20-Sep-47 | Bolton Wanderers | H | 0–0 | | 43,920 | Report | Report |
| 27-Sep-47 | Everton | A | 3–0 | Balmer 50' Stubbins 51' Fagan 80' | 66,776 | Report | Report |
| 04-Oct-47 | Middlesbrough | A | 1–3 | Balmer 13' | 41,140 | Report | Report |
| 11-Oct-47 | Chelsea | H | 3–0 | Priday 3' Stubbins Liddell 87' | 51,359 | Report | Report |
| 18-Oct-47 | Huddersfield Town | A | 1–1 | Balmer 28' | 27,518 | Report | Report |
| 25-Oct-47 | Derby County | H | 2–2 | Priday 25' Balmer 57' | 49,624 | Report | Report |
| 01-Nov-47 | Blackpool | A | 0–2 | | 23,999 | Report | Report |
| 08-Nov-47 | Grimsby Town | H | 3–1 | Stubbins 1' Priday 49' Baron 77' | 36,796 | Report | Report |
| 15-Nov-47 | Sunderland | A | 1–5 | Liddell 41' | 37,258 | Report | Report |
| 22-Nov-47 | Blackburn Rovers | H | 2–1 | Balmer 55' Liddell 80' | 35,672 | Report | Report |
| 29-Nov-47 | Manchester City | A | 0–2 | | 40,093 | Report | Report |
| 06-Dec-47 | Aston Villa | H | 3–3 | Spicer Stubbins Balmer 88' | 37,732 | Report | Report |
| 13-Dec-47 | Wolverhampton Wanderers | A | 2–1 | Stubbins 33' Balmer 70' | 31,317 | Report | Report |
| 20-Dec-47 | Preston North End | A | 3–3 | Jones 3' Liddell 20' Stubbins 22' | 30,452 | Report | Report |
| 25-Dec-47 | Arsenal | H | 1–3 | Priday 13' | 53,604 | Report | Report |
| 27-Dec-47 | Arsenal | A | 2–1 | Stubbins 17' Liddell 75' | 56,650 | Report | Report |
| 01-Jan-48 | Charlton Athletic | H | 2–3 | Stubbins 80', 88' | 34,533 | Report | Report |
| 03-Jan-48 | Stoke City | H | 0–0 | | 48,665 | Report | Report |
| 17-Jan-48 | Burnley | A | 0–3 | | 31,470 | Report | Report |
| 31-Jan-48 | Portsmouth | H | 0–3 | | 23,097 | Report | Report |
| 07-Feb-48 | Bolton Wanderers | A | 0–3 | | 22,895 | Report | Report |
| 21-Feb-48 | Middlesbrough | H | 0–1 | | 36,133 | Report | Report |
| 28-Feb-48 | Chelsea | A | 1–3 | Baron 75' | 39,078 | Report | Report |
| 06-Mar-48 | Huddersfield Town | H | 4–0 | Stubbins 3', 19', 54', 60' | 46,342 | Report | Report |
| 20-Mar-48 | Blackpool | H | 2–0 | Stubbins 1' (pen.) | 48,725 | Report | Report |
| 26-Mar-48 | Sheffield United | H | 4–0 | Fagan 6', 90' Liddell 41' Stubbins 57' | 54,797 | Report | Report |
| 27-Mar-48 | Grimsby Town | A | 2–0 | Balmer 8' Spicer 17' | 15,781 | Report | Report |
| 31-Mar-48 | Derby County | A | 4–0 | Stubbins 3' Balmer 21', 24' Fagan 87' | 16,277 | Report | Report |
| 03-Apr-48 | Sunderland | H | 0–0 | | 49,687 | Report | Report |
| 10-Apr-48 | Blackburn Rovers | A | 2–1 | Stubbins 13' Balmer 50' | 25,915 | Report | Report |
| 17-Apr-48 | Manchester City | H | 1–1 | Fagan 10' | 39,348 | Report | Report |
| 21-Apr-48 | Everton | H | 4–0 | Stubbins 14' Liddell 80' Brierley 81' Balmer 83' | 55,305 | Report | Report |
| 24-Apr-48 | Aston Villa | A | 1–2 | Stubbins 25' | 22,668 | Report | Report |
| 01-May-48 | Wolverhampton Wanderers | H | 2–1 | Paisley 22' Balmer 80' | 31,775 | Report | Report |

=== FA Cup ===
| Date | Opponents | Venue | Result | Scorers | Attendance | Report 1 | Report 2 |
|---|---|---|---|---|---|---|---|
| 10-Jan-48 | Nottingham Forest | H | 4–1 | Priday 15' Stubbins 78', 87' Liddell 82' | 48,569 | Report | Report |
| 24-Jan-48 | Manchester United | A | 0–3 | | 74,721 | Report | Report |
