= List of Liverpool F.C. players (25–99 appearances) =

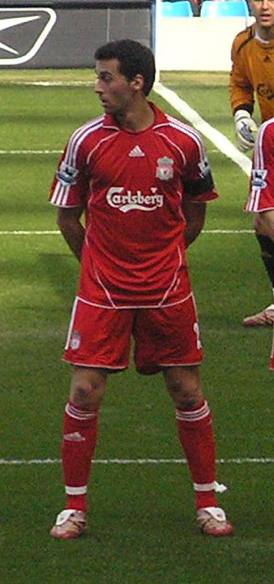
Álvaro Arbeloa playing for Liverpool in 2007

Liverpool Football Club is an English association football club based in Liverpool, Merseyside. The club was formed in 1892 following a disagreement between the board of Everton and club president John Houlding, who owned the club's ground, Anfield. The disagreement between the two parties over rent resulted in Everton moving to Goodison Park from Anfield, which left Houlding with an empty stadium. Thus, he founded Liverpool F.C. to play in the empty stadium. Liverpool won the First Division title for the first time in 1901; since then, the club has won a further 19 league titles, along with eight FA Cups and ten League Cups. They have also been crowned champions of European football on six occasions, winning the European Cup/UEFA Champions League in 1977, 1978, 1981, 1984, 2005 and 2019. The club was one of 22 members of the Premier League when it was formed in 1992. They experienced the most successful period in their history under the management of Bob Paisley, who guided the team to 21 trophies in nine seasons.

Since playing their first match, more than 700 players have appeared in competitive first-team matches for the club, many of whom have played between 25 and 99 matches (including substitute appearances). Jim Beglin, Álvaro Arbeloa and Thiago Alcântara made 98 appearances for the club before an injury to Beglin, Arbeloa's sale to Real Madrid and Thiago's release ended their Liverpool careers. Ned Doig, who appeared 53 times for the club, is the oldest player to have played for Liverpool. He was 41 years and 165 days when he played against Newcastle United on 11 April 1908. Frank Becton, who made 86 appearances for Liverpool, was the first player from the club to represent his country, when he played for England in 1897.

215 players have played between 25 and 99 competitive matches for the club. Of those players, 8 still play for the club and can add to their total.

== Players ==
- Appearances and goals are for first-team competitive matches only, including Premier League, Football League, FA Cup, EFL Cup, FA Charity/Community Shield, European Cup/UEFA Champions League, UEFA Cup/UEFA Europa League, UEFA Cup Winners' Cup, Inter-Cities Fairs Cup, UEFA Super Cup and FIFA Club World Cup matches; wartime matches are regarded as unofficial and are excluded, as are matches from the abandoned 1939–40 season.
- Players are listed according to the date of their first-team debut for the club.
- Positions are listed according to the tactical formations that were employed at the time. Thus, the change in the names of defensive and midfield reflects the tactical evolution that occurred from the 1960s onwards.
- Statistics correct as of 8 November 2026.

Table headers

- Nationality – If a player played international football, the country/countries he played for are shown. Otherwise, the player's nationality is given as their country of birth.
- Liverpool career – The year of the player's first appearance for Liverpool to the year of his last appearance.
- Starts – The number of games started.
- Subs – The number of games played as a substitute. Substitutions were only introduced to the Football League in the 1960s.
- Total – The total number of games played as a starter and substitute.

Positions key
Pre-1960s		1960s–	
GK	Goalkeeper		
FB	Full back	DF	Defender
HB	Half back	MF	Midfielder
FW	Forward		
U	Utility player		

Liverpool players with 25 to 99 appearances
Player	Nationality	Position	Liverpool career	Starts	Subs	Total	Goals	Ref.
Player	Nationality	Position	Liverpool career	Appearances			Goals	Ref.
Andrew Hannah	Scotland	FB	1892–1895	69	0	69	1	
Duncan McLean	Scotland	FB	1892–1895	82	0	82	5	
James McBride	Scotland	FB	1892–1894	56	0	56	7	
Hugh McQueen	Scotland	HB	1892–1895	61	0	61	18	
Tom Wyllie	Scotland	FW	1892–1893	25	0	25	15	
Patrick Gordon	Scotland	HB	1893–1894	30	0	30	8	
Billy McOwen	England	GK	1893–1894	27	0	27	0	
David Hannah	Ireland	FW	1894–1897	33	0	33	12	
Jimmy Ross	Scotland	FW	1894–1897	85	0	85	39	
John McLean	Scotland	FB	1894–1895	29	0	29	0	
George Allan	Scotland	FW	1895–1897; 1898–1899	96	0	96	58	
John Holmes	England	FB	1895–1898	44	0	44	0	
Frank Becton	England	FW	1895–1898	86	0	86	42	
Tom Wilkie	Scotland	FB	1895–1898	64	0	64	1	
Robert Neil	Scotland	FB	1895–1897	27	0	27	3	
Thomas Cleghorn	Scotland	FB	1896–1899	70	0	70	1	
Andrew McCowie	Scotland	FW	1897–1899	35	0	35	11	
Raby Howell	England	FB	1898–1901	67	0	67	0	
Hugh Morgan	Scotland	FW	1898–1900	68	0	68	17	
Charlie Wilson	England	FB	1898–1905	91	0	91	3	
John Hunter	Scotland	FW	1899–1902	45	0	45	12	
Charlie Satterthwaite	England	FW	1899–1901	45	0	45	13	
Andy McGuigan	Scotland	FW	1900–1902	37	0	37	14	
Thomas Robertson	Scotland	FB	1900–1902	47	0	47	0	
John Glover	England	FB	1900–1903	59	0	59	0	
George Fleming	Scotland	FB	1901–1905	82	0	82	6	
George Livingstone	Scotland	FW	1902–1903	32	0	32	4	
Edgar Chadwick	England	FW	1902–1904	45	0	45	7	
Peter Platt	England	GK	1902–1904	45	0	45	0	
Dickie Morris	Wales	FW	1902–1905	39	0	39	5	
John Hughes	Wales	FB	1903–1904	32	0	32	2	
John Carlin	England	FW	1903–1907	35	0	35	8	
Ned Doig	Scotland	GK	1904–1908	53	0	53	0	
Bill McPherson	Scotland	FW	1906–1908	55	0	55	17	
Percy Saul	England	FB	1906–1909	83	0	83	2	
Sam Bowyer	England	FW	1907–1912	48	0	48	16	
Tom Rogers	England	FB	1907–1911	40	0	40	0	
Harold Uren	England	HB	1907–1912	45	0	45	2	
John McConnell	Scotland	FB	1909–1912	53	0	53	1	
John McDonald	Scotland	HB	1909–1912	81	0	81	4	
James Stewart	Scotland	FW	1909–1913	63	0	63	26	
Ernest Peake	Wales	FB	1909–1914	55	0	55	6	
Samual Gilligan	Scotland	FW	1910–1912	40	0	40	16	
John Bovill	Scotland	FW	1911–1913	29	0	29	7	
Arthur Metcalf	England	FW	1912–1915	63	0	63	28	
Tom Gracie	Scotland	FW	1912–1914	34	0	34	5	
Sam Speakman	England	FB	1913–1919	26	0	26	0	
Thomas Fairfoul	Scotland	FB	1913–1915	71	0	71	0	
William Banks	England	HB	1914–1915	26	0	26	6	
James Nicholl	Scotland	FW	1914–1915	59	0	59	14	
Fred Pagnam	England	FW	1914–1919	39	0	39	30	
Albert Pearson	England	HB	1919–1921	51	0	51	4	
Jack Bamber	England	HB	1919–1923	80	0	80	2	
Harold Wadsworth	England	HB	1919–1924	55	0	55	3	
Harry Lewis	England	FW	1919–1922	70	0	70	12	
Dick Johnson	England	FW	1920–1925	82	0	82	30	
Danny Shone	England	FW	1921–1925	81	0	81	26	
Jimmy Walsh	England	FW	1923–1928	77	0	77	27	
David Pratt	Scotland	FB	1923–1927	84	0	84	1	
William Cockburn	England	FB	1924–1926	67	0	67	0	
Archibald Rawlings	England	HB	1924–1926	67	0	67	10	
David McMullan	Ireland	FB	1925–1928	35	0	35	0	
Cyril Oxley	England	HB	1925–1926	34	0	34	6	
Tommy Reid	England	FW	1926–1929	55	0	55	30	
Robert Clark	England	FW	1928–1931	42	0	42	11	
Henry Race	England	FW	1928–1930	43	0	43	18	
Dave Davidson	Scotland	FB	1928–1930	62	0	62	2	
Jimmy Smith	Scotland	FW	1929–1931	62	0	62	38	
Gordon Gunson	England	HB	1930–1933	87	0	87	26	
Danny McRorie	Scotland	HB	1930–1932	35	0	35	6	
Syd Roberts	England	FW	1932–1936	62	0	62	13	
Harold Taylor	England	HB	1932–1937	72	0	72	6	
Benjamin Dabbs	England	FB	1933–1937	56	0	56	0	
Jack Tennant	England	FB	1933–1935	42	0	42	0	
Sam English	Ireland	FW	1933–1935	50	0	50	26	
Lance Carr	South Africa	FW	1933–1936	33	0	33	8	
Tom Bush	England	HB	1933–1947	69	0	69	1	
Ernie Blenkinsop	England	FB	1934–1937	71	0	71	0	
Tommy Johnson	England	FW	1934–1936	38	0	38	8	
Fred Rogers	England	FB	1934–1939	75	0	75	0	
Vic Wright	England	FW	1934–1937	85	0	85	33	
Fred Howe	England	FW	1935–1938	94	0	94	36	
Alf Hobson	England	GK	1936–1946	28	0	28	0	
Barney Ramsden	England	FB	1937–1947	63	0	63	0	
Dirk Kemp	South Africa	GK	1937–1939	30	0	30	0	
Jimmy McInnes	Scotland	FB	1938–1939	48	0	48	1	
Charlie Ashcroft	England	GK	1946–1955	89	0	89	0	
Ray Minshull	England	GK	1946–1950	31	0	31	0	
Robert Priday	South Africa	HB	1946–1949	40	0	40	7	
Bill Shepherd	England	FB	1948–1951	58	0	58	0	
Ken Brierley	England	HB	1948–1953	61	0	61	8	
Bryan Williams	England	HB	1949–1953	34	0	34	5	
Russell Crossley	England	GK	1950–1954	73	0	73	0	
John Heydon	England	FB	1950–1953	67	0	67	0	
John Smith	England	HB	1951–1953	59	0	59	14	
Alan Arnell	England	FW	1953–1961	75	0	75	35	
Eric Anderson	England	FW	1953–1956	76	0	76	22	
Dave Underwood	England	GK	1953–1956	50	0	50	0	
Sammy Smyth	Northern Ireland	FW	1953–1954	44	0	44	20	
Frank Lock	England	FB	1953–1955	42	0	42	0	
Don Campbell	England	FB	1953–1958	48	0	48	2	
Barry Wilkinson	England	HB	1953–1959	79	0	79	0	
Thomas McNulty	England	FB	1954–1957	36	0	36	0	
Doug Rudham	South Africa	GK	1954–1959	66	0	66	0	
Tony Rowley	Wales	FW	1954–1958	63	0	63	39	
Johnny Morrissey	England	HB	1957–1961	37	0	37	6	
Fred Morris	England	HB	1958–1959	48	0	48	14	
Bobby Campbell	England	HB	1958–1960	25	0	25	2	
Kevin Lewis	England	MF	1960–1963	82	0	82	44	
Alf Arrowsmith	England	U	1961–1968	50	6	56	24	
Philip Ferns	England	DF	1962–1965	28	0	28	1	
Jim Furnell	England	GK	1962–1963	28	0	28	0	
Tony Hateley	England	FW	1967–1968	56	0	56	28	
Ian Ross	Scotland	DF	1967–1972	59	10	69	4	
Peter Wall	England	DF	1968–1970	42	0	42	0	
John McLaughlin	England	DF	1970–1974	53	2	55	3	
Colin Irwin	England	DF	1979–1981	40	4	44	3	
David Hodgson	England	FW	1982–1984	33	16	49	10	
Michael Robinson	Republic of Ireland	FW	1983–1984	46	6	52	13	
Jim Beglin	Republic of Ireland	DF	1984–1987	98	0	98	3	
Kevin MacDonald	Scotland	MF	1984–1988	49	15	64	5	
Mike Hooper	England	GK	1986–1993	71	2	73	0	
Nigel Spackman	England	MF	1987–1988	50	13	63	0	
Glenn Hysén	Sweden	DF	1989–1992	91	2	93	3	
Nick Tanner	England	DF	1989–1992	51	8	59	1	
Ronny Rosenthal	Israel	FW	1990–1993	41	56	97	22	
Dean Saunders	Wales	FW	1991–1992	61	0	61	25	
Paul Stewart	England	MF	1992–1993	38	4	42	3	
Don Hutchison	Scotland	MF	1992–1994	44	16	60	10	
Nigel Clough	England	MF	1993–1995	34	10	44	9	
John Scales	England	DF	1994–1996	93	1	94	4	
Stan Collymore	England	FW	1995–1997	71	10	81	35	
David Thompson	England	MF	1996–2000	31	25	56	5	
Paul Ince	England	MF	1997–1999	81	0	81	17	
Karl-Heinz Riedle	Germany	FW	1997–1999	42	34	76	15	
Øyvind Leonhardsen	Norway	MF	1997–1999	42	7	49	7	
Bjørn Tore Kvarme	Norway	DF	1997–1999	48	6	54	0	
Vegard Heggem	Norway	DF	1998–2000	46	19	65	3	
Brad Friedel	United States	GK	1998–1999	30	1	31	0	
Erik Meijer	Netherlands	FW	1999–2000	10	17	27	2	
Titi Camara	Guinea	FW	1999–2000	24	13	37	10	
Rigobert Song	Cameroon	DF	1999–2000	30	8	38	0	
Markus Babbel	Germany	DF	2000–2002	71	2	73	6	
Nick Barmby	England	MF	2000–2002	38	20	58	8	
Gary McAllister	Scotland	MF	2000–2002	52	35	87	9	
Christian Ziege	Germany	DF	2000–2001	20	12	32	2	
Chris Kirkland	England	GK	2000–2004	45	0	45	0	
Jari Litmanen	Finland	MF	2001–2002	19	24	43	9	
El Hadji Diouf	Senegal	FW	2002–2004	61	19	80	6	
Salif Diao	Senegal	MF	2002–2005	35	26	61	3	
Bruno Cheyrou	France	MF	2002–2004	27	21	48	5	
Florent Sinama Pongolle	France	FW	2003–2006	21	45	66	9	
Anthony Le Tallec	France	MF	2003–2005	13	19	32	1	
Stephen Warnock	England	DF	2004–2007	46	21	67	1	
Josemi	Spain	DF	2004–2005	28	7	35	0	
Djibril Cissé	France	FW	2004–2006	43	36	79	24	
Antonio Núñez	Spain	MF	2004–2005	13	14	27	1	
Mohamed Sissoko	Mali	MF	2005–2007	72	15	87	1	
Fernando Morientes	Spain	FW	2005–2006	47	14	61	12	
Boudewijn Zenden	Netherlands	MF	2005–2007	30	17	47	2	
Mark González	Chile	MF	2006–2007	20	16	36	3	
Jermaine Pennant	England	MF	2006–2008	54	27	81	3	
Craig Bellamy	Wales	FW	2006–2007; 2011–2012	50	28	78	18	
Nabil El Zhar	Morocco	FW	2006–2010	5	27	32	1	
Andriy Voronin	Ukraine	FW	2007–2009	21	19	40	6	
Álvaro Arbeloa	Spain	DF	2007–2009	93	5	98	2	
Emiliano Insúa	Argentina	DF	2007–2010	58	4	62	1	
Robbie Keane	Republic of Ireland	FW	2008–2009	23	5	28	7	
Andrea Dossena	Italy	DF	2008–2009	22	9	31	2	
David Ngog	France	FW	2008–2011	41	53	94	19	
Albert Riera	Spain	MF	2008–2010	45	11	56	5	
Jay Spearing	England	MF	2008–2012	45	10	55	0	
Martin Kelly	England	DF	2008–2014	50	12	62	1	
Sotirios Kyrgiakos	Greece	DF	2009–2011	38	11	49	3	
Alberto Aquilani	Italy	MF	2009–2010	14	14	28	2	
Maxi Rodríguez	Argentina	MF	2010–2012	60	13	73	17	
Joe Cole	England	MF	2010–2012	23	19	42	5	
Raul Meireles	Portugal	MF	2010–2011	41	3	44	5	
Brad Jones	Australia	GK	2010–2014	26	1	27	0	
Jonjo Shelvey	England	MF	2010–2013	31	38	69	7	
Andy Carroll	England	FW	2011–2012	35	23	58	11	
Jon Flanagan	England	DF	2011–2017	44	5	49	1	
Charlie Adam	Scotland	MF	2011–2012	32	5	37	2	
Stewart Downing	England	MF	2011–2013	75	16	91	7	
José Enrique	Spain	DF	2011–2016	86	13	99	2	
Fabio Borini	Italy	FW	2012–2015	15	23	38	3	
Jordon Ibe	England	MF	2013–2016	31	27	58	4	
Kolo Touré	Ivory Coast	DF	2013–2016	52	19	71	1	
Mamadou Sakho	France	DF	2013–2017	75	5	80	3	
Rickie Lambert	England	FW	2014–2015	12	24	36	3	
Lazar Marković	Serbia	MF	2014–2015	23	11	34	3	
Mario Balotelli	Italy	FW	2014–2015	14	14	28	4	
Christian Benteke	Belgium	FW	2015–2016	20	22	42	10	
Danny Ings	England	FW	2015–2018	8	17	25	4	
Ragnar Klavan	Estonia	DF	2016–2018	40	13	53	2	
Loris Karius	Germany	GK	2016–2018	49	0	49	0	
Dominic Solanke	England	FW	2017–2018	6	21	27	1	
Xherdan Shaqiri	Switzerland	MF	2018–2021	25	38	63	8	
Adrián	Spain	GK	2019–2022	24	2	26	0	
Caoimhín Kelleher	Republic of Ireland	GK	2019–2025	67	0	67	0	
Neco Williams	Wales	DF	2019–2022	21	12	33	0	
Takumi Minamino	Japan	FW	2020–2022	21	34	55	14	
Nat Phillips	England	DF	2020–2023	22	7	29	1	
Thiago	Spain	MF	2020–2024	71	27	98	3	
Conor Bradley	Northern Ireland	DF	2021–	47	31	78	1	
Wataru Endo	Japan	MF	2023–	44	43	87	2	
Jarell Quansah	England	DF	2023–2025	40	18	58	3	
Trey Nyoni	England	MF	2024–	10	23	33	1	
Federico Chiesa	Italy	FW	2024–	9	42	51	5	
Rio Ngumoha	England	FW	2025–	17	27	44	2	
Hugo Ekitike	France	FW	2025–	34	11	45	17	
Milos Kerkez	Hungary	DF	2025–	48	13	61	2	
Florian Wirtz	Germany	MF	2025–	52	12	64	9	
Jeremie Frimpong	Netherlands	DF	2025–	27	16	43	3	
Alexander Isak	Sweden	FW	2025–	23	13	36	12	

== Notes ==
- Ponting, Ivan (1998), Liverpool: Player by Player, Hamlyn, ISBN 0-600-59493-9
