= Ray Minshull =

Ray Minshull may refer to:

- Ray Minshull (footballer) (1920–2005), English goalkeeper
- Ray Minshull (record producer) (1934–2007), British classical record producer
