= Minshull =

Minshull is a surname. Notable people with the surname include:

- Jake Minshull (born 2004), English runner
- John Minshull (c. 1741–1793), English cricketer
- Lee Minshull (born 1985), English footballer
- Ray Minshull (footballer) (1920–2005), English footballer
- Ray Minshull (record producer) (1934–2007), British classical record producer
- Richard Minshull (died 1686), English academic

== See also ==
- John Minshull-Ford (1881–1948), British Army officer
- Kellie-Jay Keen-Minshull, British anti-transgender rights activist
- Church Minshull, in Cheshire, England
- Minshull Vernon, also in Cheshire
