= John Heydon =

John Heydon may refer to:

- John Heydon (astrologer), English occult philosopher, astrologer and attorney
- John Heydon (footballer), English footballer
- John Heydon (died 1479), lawyer
- John Heydon (soldier), English military commander and mathematician
