= Jim Harley =

Scottish footballer

Personal information
- Date of birth: 21 February 1917
- Place of birth: Methil, Fife, Scotland
- Date of death: 9 July 1989 (aged 72)
- Place of death: Kirkcaldy, Scotland
- Position: Full-back

Senior career*
Years	Team	Apps	(Gls)
1932–1934	Hearts of Beath		
1934–1949	Liverpool	115	(0)

International career
1945	Scotland (wartime)	2	(0)
- * Club domestic league appearances and goals

James Harley (21 February 1917 – 7 September 1989) was a Scottish footballer who played for Liverpool.

== Life and playing career ==
Born in Methil, Fife, Harley played for Hearts of Beath before George Patterson brought him to Liverpool in April 1934. His debut came 28 September 1935 in a First Division match at Anfield against West Bromwich Albion. In this match, Liverpool won by 5–0 but Harley did not score.

Harley never really established himself at first but he stayed loyal to the club and got his chance during the 1937–38 season. Missing ten of the 47 fixtures, he was even swapped over to the left-back berth when Liverpool brought Tom Cooper into the starting line-up.

Harley carried on in much the same way with 27 appearances in 45 matches, yet again, he started the three opening games of the 1939–40 and probably would have carried on playing in either of the full-back roles if it were not for the outbreak of the Second World War — curtailing the careers of Harley and his peers. During the conflict, he served with the Royal Naval Commandos, and featured for the Reds in unofficial wartime competitions. This was rare until 1944 but became more regular afterwards.

After the six-year break, Harley returned to Merseyside and played in 17 games of the first post-war championship winning team, a side that contained the likes of Jack Balmer, Bill Jones, Berry Nieuwenhuys, Albert Stubbins, Billy Liddell and Bob Paisley.

The 1947–48 season saw Harley put together 21 starts for Liverpool but this was his last season at Anfield. He was now in his 30s and was no longer seen as a part of the future of the club. He departed when his contract expired in 1948.

Harley never got a call for Scotland but he did represent them in two wartime internationals, which are not regarded as 'official' fixtures.

== Honours ==
Liverpool

- Football League champions: 1946–47
