= Joseph Maloney =

Joseph Maloney may refer to:

- Joseph Moloney (1857–1896), Irish-born British medical officer
- Joseph F. Maloney, Socialist Labor Party candidate for President of the United States, 1900
- Joe Maloney (1934–2006), English footballer
