= Joe Maloney =

English footballer (1934-2006)

Personal information
- Full name: Joseph John Maloney
- Date of birth: 26 January 1934
- Place of birth: Liverpool, England
- Date of death: 17 October 2006 (aged 72)
- Place of death: Crewe, England
- Positions: Central defender; half-back

Youth career
- Liverpool

Senior career*
Years	Team	Apps	(Gls)
1951–1954	Liverpool	12	(0)
1954–1960	Shrewsbury Town	237	(1)
1961	Port Vale	1	(0)
1961–1963	Crewe Alexandra	26	(0)
1963–1965	Winsford United		
Total		276	(1)
- * Club domestic league appearances and goals

Joseph John Maloney (26 January 1934 – 17 October 2006) was an English footballer. A half-back, he had an 11-year career in the English Football League, making 289 league and cup appearances.

He graduated from a youth player at Liverpool to sign professional forms with the club in January 1951. He signed with Shrewsbury Town three years later and helped the "Shrews" to win promotion out of the Fourth Division in 1958–59. He transferred to Port Vale in June 1961 before moving on to Crewe Alexandra just two months later. He helped the "Railwaymen" to win promotion out of the Fourth Division in 1962–63 before he joined non-League club Winsford United.

== Career ==
=== Liverpool ===
Maloney started his career at Liverpool, coming through the junior ranks at Anfield to sign professional forms in January 1951. He took the place of Bob Paisley when making his first-team debut in a goalless draw at home to Bolton Wanderers in March 1953. He made a further eleven first-team appearances as a central defender but could do little to prevent Don Welsh's "Reds" from losing their First Division status at the end of the 1953–54 season.

=== Shrewsbury Town ===
Maloney signed with Shrewsbury Town in July 1954. He stayed with the "Shrews" for a further seven years, making 237 league appearances in the process. The club finished 16th in the Third Division South in 1954–55, before manager Walter Rowley took them to 13th in 1955–56 and ninth in 1956–57. They could only finish 17th in 1957–58 under the management of Harry Potts and then Johnny Spuhler, and so became founder members of the Fourth Division. Arthur Rowley was then appointed as manager, and Shrewsbury won promotion to the Third Division in 1958–59 after securing the fourth and final automatic promotion place. They posted a third-place finish in 1959–60, missing out on a second successive promotion by just one place and seven points. They finished tenth in 1960–61.

=== Later career ===
Maloney joined Norman Low's Port Vale in June 1961 and played his only game for the club at Gay Meadow on 19 August 1961, in a 4–2 defeat to Shrewsbury. He was sold to nearby Crewe Alexandra for a small fee just two days later. Under the stewardship of Jimmy McGuigan, the "Railwaymen" finished tenth in the Fourth Division in 1961–62, before winning promotion with a third-place finish in 1962–63. After 26 league games at Gresty Road, he left the English Football League to join Cheshire County League side Winsford United.

== Career statistics ==
Appearances and goals by club, season and competition
Club	Season	League			FA Cup		League Cup		Total	
Club	Season	Division	Apps	Goals	Apps	Goals	Apps	Goals	Apps	Goals
Liverpool	1952–53	First Division	6	0	0	0	—		6	0
Liverpool	1953–54	First Division	6	0	0	0	—		6	0
Liverpool	Total		12	0	0	0	0	0	12	0
Shrewsbury Town	1954–55	Third Division South	45	1	1	0	—		46	1
Shrewsbury Town	1955–56	Third Division South	46	0	4	0	—		50	0
Shrewsbury Town	1956–57	Third Division South	43	0	1	0	—		44	0
Shrewsbury Town	1957–58	Third Division South	43	0	1	0	—		44	0
Shrewsbury Town	1958–59	Fourth Division	46	0	5	0	—		51	0
Shrewsbury Town	1959–60	Third Division	14	0	0	0	—		14	0
Shrewsbury Town	Total		237	1	12	0	0	0	249	1
Port Vale	1961–62	Third Division	1	0	0	0	0	0	1	0
Crewe Alexandra	1961–62	Fourth Division	19	0	0	0	1	0	20	0
Crewe Alexandra	1962–63	Fourth Division	7	0	0	0	0	0	7	0
Crewe Alexandra	Total		26	0	0	0	1	0	27	0
Career total			276	1	12	0	1	0	289	1

== Honours ==
Shrewsbury Town

- Football League Fourth Division fourth-place promotion: 1958–59

Crewe Alexandra

- Football League Fourth Division third-place promotion: 1962–63
