= Arthur Rowley (footballer, born 1933) =

English footballer

Personal information
- Full name: Arthur Rowley
- Date of birth: 9 May 1933
- Place of birth: Fazakerley, England
- Date of death: 18 February 2014 (aged 80)
- Place of death: Aintree, England
- Position: Forward

Youth career
- Florence Melly Boys Club

Senior career*
Years	Team	Apps	(Gls)
1952–1953	Liverpool	11	(0)
1953–1956	Wrexham	54	(8)
1956–1958	Crewe Alexandra	32	(8)
- Burscough
- Chorley
Total		97	(16)
- * Club domestic league appearances and goals

Arthur Rowley (9 May 1933 – 18 February 2014) was an English footballer who played as a striker.
