= Hugh Gerhardi =

South African footballer

Personal information
- Full name: Hugh Gerhardi
- Date of birth: 5 May 1933
- Place of birth: Johannesburg, South Africa
- Date of death: 12 January 1985 (aged 51)
- Place of death: Johannesburg, South Africa
- Position: Defender

Senior career*
Years	Team	Apps	(Gls)
1950–1952	Durban Thistle		
1952–1953	Liverpool F.C.	6	(0)
- * Club domestic league appearances and goals

Hugh Gerhardi (5 May 1933 - 12 January 1985) was a South African footballer who played as a defender.
