= Ray Minshull (record producer) =

Minshull, centre, with Herbert von Karajan at a session for La bohème, October 1972

Raymond Phillip Minshull (27 March 1934 – 16 February 2007) was a British classical record producer. His whole career was spent with Decca Records, for whom he produced more than 300 recordings between 1958 and 1993. He became John Culshaw's successor as head of Decca's classical music division in 1967.

Among the artists whom Minshull signed to exclusive contracts with the company were Kyung Wha Chung, Charles Dutoit, Pascal Rogé, Luciano Pavarotti and Jean-Yves Thibaudet. He was responsible for the first complete recording of Haydn's 104 numbered symphonies, and award-winning sets of Janáček operas conducted by Charles Mackerras, and produced many recordings that have remained in the catalogues for decades.

== Life and career ==
=== Early years ===
Minshull was born in Birmingham on 27 March 1934, the younger son of Oliver Ward Minshull – a chartered electrical engineer – and his wife Alys Elizabeth, née Key. In 1943 he went to Tettenhall College, near Birmingham, where he learnt the piano, organ and flute. He went on to Sheffield University, where he studied languages and music. After National Service he initially accepted a job with a north London newspaper, but he was concerned that his music degree would result in his becoming the paper's music correspondent, which was not a role he sought. He made approaches to Decca Records and two other recording organisations in the hope of securing a position in which he could make use of his formal musical training and ability to read a score. He joined Decca in October 1957.

Engaged as a musical assistant, Minshull was quickly promoted to production duties. John Culshaw wrote of him in his memoirs, "He could be stubborn to the point of obduracy, but nobody questioned his knowledge of the scores he was handling". His first recording, in early 1958, was with Joan Sutherland in her first Decca recording – two arias from Handel's Alcina. This was for the L'Oiseau-Lyre label, an associate company of Decca (later part of the Decca group). In the early days of stereophony, stereo took second place to the prevailing mono, and a senior producer would take overall charge of recording sessions with a junior assigned to control a separate stereo recording of each session. Minshull supervised the stereo recordings for several sessions in which senior colleagues including James Walker, Erik Smith and Christopher Raeburn controlled the mono taping.

Minshull worked on sessions that delivered many recordings that remained in the catalogues for decades, including Schubert's "Great C Major" Symphony with the London Symphony Orchestra conducted by Josef Krips, Handel's Acis and Galatea with Sutherland, Peter Pears and Owen Brannigan, conducted by Sir Adrian Boult, Dvořák's Seventh Symphony conducted by Pierre Monteux, the Mozart Horn Concertos played by Barry Tuckwell, Holst's The Perfect Fool and Egdon Heath conducted by Boult. In one recording Minshull appeared anonymously as a performer: for Herbert von Karajan's 1959 set of Also Sprach Zarathustra, produced by Culshaw, he played the short organ part.

=== 1960s and 1970s ===
From the early 1960s the practice of separate mono and stereo taping of sessions was phased out and Minshull was thereafter in sole charge of his recordings. During the decade these included Janet Baker in Dido and Aeneas, a complete Alcina with Sutherland, Rafael Frühbeck de Burgos conducting Schumann's Rhenish Symphony, and Benjamin Britten conducting Bach's Brandenburg Concertos,

In July 1962 Minshull married Mary Ann Quinlan. Culshaw resigned from Decca in 1967 to become head of music for BBC Television. Minshull was chosen to succeed him, ahead of senior producers including Smith and Raeburn. Culshaw felt that this was a good decision by Decca because next to the chairman, Sir Edward Lewis, the most powerful man in the group was the volatile Maurice Rosengarten; Culshaw wrote, "Only a very cool and assured head could counter-balance his impetuosity, and no matter what the crisis, Ray Minshull was incapable of working himself into a flap". The Times later commented, "That calmness stood him in good stead with temperamental artists and in negotiations with the unions. Above all he was a discerning musician with a keen ear that came in useful in many a studio crisis". Rosenthal died in 1975 and Minshull was appointed to succeed him as director of classical recording.

In his executive capacity, Minshull was responsible for – but did not produce – two of Decca's most celebrated series of recordings: the first complete recording of Haydn's symphonies, with Antal Doráti conducting the Philharmonia Hungarica, and five Janáček operas recorded with the Vienna Philharmonic Orchestra under Charles Mackerras. Among the artists he signed to exclusive Decca contracts were Kyung Wha Chung, Charles Dutoit, Luciano Pavarotti, Pascal Rogé and Jean-Yves Thibaudet.

Recordings produced by Minshull in the 1970s include sets of Elgar's two symphonies conducted by Georg Solti, regarded at the time as mould-breaking, many sets in which Britten conducted his own works and those of other composers – frequently Mozart, with Clifford Curzon as soloist – numerous sets of Beethoven piano sonatas played by Vladimir Ashkenazy, a cycle of Schumann symphonies conducted by Solti, a set of Die Meistersinger with the Vienna Philharmonic and Norman Bailey as Sachs, a Beethoven symphony cycle with Solti and the Chicago Symphony Orchestra, The orchestra's home base, Orchestra Hall, had poor acoustics and Minshull recalled that Decca examined 76 halls in and around Chicago before settling for Medinah Hall. (Note: Minshull kept a close eye on available recording venues, and periodically canvassed his colleagues for their views on recording locations and their suitability for a range of repertoire genres, from large-scale choral works and opera, to chamber and solo instrumental music. The results of such surveys helped Decca decide on contracts with recording venues.) There, Minshull supervised recordings of a wide range of music from Debussy's Prélude à l'après-midi d'un faune to Wagner's Der fliegende Holländer, Beethoven's Missa Solemnis and Fidelio (the world's first release of a digital opera recording).

=== Later years ===
Lewis died in 1980 and Decca ceased to be an independent company, being absorbed by the international Polygram group. Minshull played an important part in the negotiations between the two companies and was appointed executive vice-president of Polygram. His Decca colleague Christopher Raeburn later praised Minshull for preserving the A&R and studio teams largely intact:

The PolyGram takeover would have been a very different story if he had not spent hours and hours putting forward the case for the retention of Decca personnel, and the values which make for Decca's individuality.

In the studio, Minshull's main centre of operations switched to Montreal, where the Montreal Symphony Orchestra and its conductor Charles Dutoit had held an exclusive recording contract with Decca since 1977. Minshull produced most of their recordings between then and his retirement. They included much French music, by composers including Berlioz, Debussy, Fauré, Franck, Ibert, Ravel and Saint Saëns; works by Russian composers including Tchaikovsky, Rimsky-Korsakov, Rachmaninoff, Prokofiev and Stravinsky; eastern European music by Bartók, Chopin, Dvořák and Janáček; and occasional forays into music from America (Gershwin), England (Elgar), Italy (Rossini) and Spain (Falla and Rodrigo). His last Montreal recording was a complete set of Les Troyens made in 1993 and issued after his retirement; it starred Gary Lakes as Énée, Deborah Voigt as Cassandre and Françoise Pollet as Didon.

Minshull was awarded an honorary DMus by McGill University in 1993. He had earlier been offered, but declined, the Silver Decoration of Honour for services to the Province of Vienna. He retired in 1994 and died in Chichester, aged 72 on 16 February 2007.

== Notes, references and sources ==
=== Sources ===
- Culshaw, John (1981). Putting the Record Straight. London: Secker & Warburg. ISBN 978-0-436-11802-9.
- Drew, Sally Elizabeth (2018). A Culture of Recording : Christopher Raeburn and the Decca Record Company (PDF). Sheffield: University of Sheffield. OCLC 1104029209.
- Furlong, William (1974). Season with Solti: A Year in the Life of the Chicago Symphony. New York: Macmillan. ISBN 0-02-542000-3.
- March, Ivan; Edward Greenfield; Robert Layton; Paul Czajkowski (2008). The Penguin Guide to Recorded Classical Music 2009. London: Penguin. ISBN 978-0-141-03335-8.
- Stuart, Philip (2009). "Decca Classical, 1929-2009" (PDF). AHRC Research Centre, King's College. London: King's College, London.
