= Don Woan =

English footballer (1927–2020)

Personal information
- Full name: Donald Woan
- Date of birth: 7 November 1927
- Place of birth: Bootle, England
- Date of death: 24 April 2020 (aged 92)
- Position: Right winger

Youth career
- –1950: Bootle

Senior career*
Years	Team	Apps	(Gls)
1950–1951	Liverpool	2	(0)
1951–1952	Leyton Orient	25	(5)
1952–1954	Bradford City	21	(4)
1954–1955	Tranmere Rovers	27	(2)
1955–	Yeovil Town		
Total		75	(11)
- * Club domestic league appearances and goals

Donald Woan (7 November 1927 – 24 April 2020) was an English footballer who played as a right winger.
