= Jack Haigh =

English footballer

Personal information
- Full name: Jack Haigh
- Date of birth: 10 September 1928
- Place of birth: Rotherham, England
- Date of death: 17 September 2007 (aged 79)
- Place of death: Doncaster, England
- Position: Inside forward

Youth career
- Bolton Wanderers

Senior career*
Years	Team	Apps	(Gls)
1949	Gainsborough Trinity		
1949–1952	Liverpool	11	(3)
1952–1960	Scunthorpe United	329	(66)
1960–1962	Doncaster Rovers	72	(6)
1962–1965	Buxton		
Total		412	(75)
- * Club domestic league appearances and goals

Jack Haigh (1928–2007) was an English footballer who played as an inside forward in the Football League. He also played for Rawmarsh Welfare F.C.

Signed by Scunthorpe from Liverpool for £4,000 in August 1952, Haigh earned the nickname the 'Iron Man' after starring in Scunthorpe's FA Cup victory over Newcastle United in January 1958.

He was described by ex-England manager Graham Taylor as "an inside-forward of craft and cunning. Today he would be described as a midfield genius and would be a regular in the England team. He could see and make a pass that no other play could see or make."

Haigh sits sixth on the Scunthorpe United all-time appearance list, with 360 appearances and 71 goals in all competitions. Following his retirement in 1965, Jack and his wife Doris settled in the Balby area of Doncaster, where for many years the couple ran a corner shop.
