= Merfyn Jones (footballer) =

Welsh footballer

John Merfyn Jones
Personal information
- Date of birth: 30 April 1931
- Place of birth: Bangor, Wales
- Date of death: 4 October 2016 (aged 85)

Youth career
- Bangor City

Senior career*
Years	Team	Apps	(Gls)
1951–1953	Liverpool	4	(0)
1953–1959	Scunthorpe United	240	(27)
1959–1961	Crewe Alexandra	84	(14)
1961–1963	Chester	63	(10)
1963–1964	Lincoln City	1	(0)
- * Club domestic league appearances and goals as of 16:02, 27 May 2024 (UTC)

John Merfyn Jones (sometimes spelt as Mervyn) (30 April 1931 – 4 October 2016) was a Welsh professional footballer who played for, among others, Liverpool, Scunthorpe United, Crewe Alexandra, Chester, Lincoln City and Gainsborough Trinity.

Jones was born in Bangor, Gwynedd, and as a left-winger was signed by Liverpool from his home-town club. He played three league games for Liverpool in the 1951–52 season, and another in November 1953. Five feet four inches (162 cm) tall, Jones was described as "one of the smallest men ever to feature at Liverpool" and made a "lively, almost cheeky" first team debut against Fulham in March 1952. Jones also played in Liverpool's infamous FA Cup third round defeat at Gateshead in January 1953.

After several seasons at Scunthorpe, he joined Crewe and famously scored one of lowly Crewe's two goals in a historic 2–2 FA Cup Fourth Round tie against Tottenham Hotspur at Gresty Road on 30 January 1960.

After retiring from football, he worked for 31 years as an estimator with Lincolnshire-based contractor Clugston Group. His death, aged 85, was announced in October 2016.
