= Joe Cadden =

Scottish footballer

Personal information
- Full name: Joseph Young Cadden
- Date of birth: 13 April 1920
- Place of birth: Glasgow, Scotland
- Date of death: 5 June 1981 (aged 61)
- Place of death: Liverpool, England
- Position: Central defender

Senior career*
Years	Team	Apps	(Gls)
- Brooklyn Wanderers
1950–1951	Liverpool	4	(0)
1952–1953	Grimsby Town	1	(0)
1953–1954	Accrington Stanley	17	(0)
1954–1955	Dumbarton		
- New Brighton
Total		22	(0)
- * Club domestic league appearances and goals

Joseph Young Cadden (13 April 1920 – 5 June 1981) was a Scottish professional footballer who played as a central defender in the Football League.
