= George Whitworth (footballer, born 1927) =

English footballer

George Whitworth (22 September 1927 – 16 March 2006) was an English footballer who played as a defender. He played for Liverpool, he made nine appearances during his time at the club.
