= Steve Parr (footballer) =

English footballer (1926–2019)

Personal information
- Date of birth: 22 December 1926
- Place of birth: Preston, Lancashire, England
- Date of death: 6 August 2019 (aged 92)
- Position: Defender

Senior career*
Years	Team	Apps	(Gls)
- Farrington Villa
1948–1955	Liverpool	20	(0)
1955–1956	Exeter City F.C.		
1956–1958	Rochdale A.F.C.		
- Burscough F.C.
- * Club domestic league appearances and goals

Steve Parr (22 December 1926 – 6 August 2019) was an English footballer who played as a defender.
