= John Smith (footballer, born 1927) =

English footballer

John Smith (21 December 1927 – August 2000) was an English footballer who played as a midfielder for Liverpool in The Football League. Smith played amateur football for Bromborough Pool before he signed for Liverpool in 1951. He made 27 appearances in each of his first two seasons at the club and scored on his debut in a 2–0 against Derby County He only featured 3 times during the 1953–54 season when the club were relegated to the Second Division. He was transferred to Torquay United at the end of the season.
