= Russell Crossley =

English footballer (1927–2018)

Personal information
- Full name: Russell Crossley
- Date of birth: 25 June 1927
- Place of birth: Hebden Bridge, Yorkshire, England
- Date of death: 2 July 2018 (aged 91)
- Place of death: Arbroath, Angus, Scotland
- Position: Goalkeeper

Senior career*
Years	Team	Apps	(Gls)
1950–1954	Liverpool	68	(0)
1954–1959	Shrewsbury Town	173	(0)
1959–1961	Kettering Town	36	(0)
- * Club domestic league appearances and goals

Russell Crossley (25 June 1927 – 2 July 2018) was an English footballer who played as a goalkeeper for Liverpool in The Football League.

== Early life and career ==
Russell Crossley was born on 25 June 1927 in Hebden Bridge. Crossley came to Liverpool's attention while he was playing for the army and signed for the club in 1950. Crossley was never the regular first choice keeper while he was at Liverpool, he was in and out of the side during his time at the club. Out of the goalkeepers in the club's history Crossley has the worst average of conceding goals. During his time at the club he conceded 138 goals in 73 matches, which equates to 1.89 goals a game.

In 1954, he left Liverpool to join Shrewsbury Town F.C., where he played until 1959, when he left football to become a farmer.

== Personal life ==
After leaving football, he taught biology in the Huddersfield area.

He had two children.

In 1997, he and his wife Joan relocated from Yorkshire to Angus, Scotland.

Crossley died on 2 July 2018 at the age of 91 in Arbroath.
