= Kevin Baron (footballer) =

English footballer (1926–1971)

Personal information
- Full name: Kevin Mark Patrick Baron
- Date of birth: 19 July 1926
- Place of birth: Preston, England
- Date of death: 5 June 1971 (aged 44)
- Place of death: Ipswich, England
- Position: Striker

Youth career
- 1942–1944: Preston North End
- 1944–1945: Liverpool

Senior career*
Years	Team	Apps	(Gls)
1945–1954	Liverpool	140	(32)
1954–1958	Southend United	138	(45)
1958–1959	Northampton Town	25	(4)
1959	Gravesend & Northfleet		
1959–1960	Wisbech Town		
1960–1961	Aldershot	6	(0)
1961	Cambridge City		
1961–1962	Bedford Town		
1962–1963	Maldon Town		
- * Club domestic league appearances and goals

Kevin Mark Patrick Baron (19 July 1926 – 5 June 1971) was a professional footballer who played for Liverpool in the post-war years.

== Life and playing career ==
Born at Preston, Lancashire, England, Baron played as an amateur for hometown club Preston before he was signed for Liverpool by George Kay in August 1945. He made his debut on 5 January 1946 in Liverpool's first competitive game after the conclusion of World War II; it was an FA Cup third round first leg match against Chester at Sealand Road and was a debut to remember for Baron. Not only did the Reds beat Chester 2–0, Baron made his debut alongside Liverpool legend Billy Liddell. Baron's first goal came on 8 November 1947 in a league match at Anfield. Grimsby Town were the visitors and Baron's 77th-minute strike secured the points in a 3–1 victory.

Baron did not break into the 1946–47 championship winning side, but played six times the following season.

Baron finally established himself as a first team regular in the 1949–50 season, the inside-forward only missed 4 of the 42 league games scoring 7 times, he also appeared in all seven FA Cup ties, scoring in the 3–1 fourth round win over Exeter City at Anfield. The final was a mixture of emotions for Baron and the Reds, from being on a high for being part of the squad that took Liverpool to their first ever Wembley final to feeling the heartache of defeat after Arsenal won the match 2–0.

Baron's appearances took a downward turn during the 1950–51 season, but he won his spot back for the following campaign and only finished second to Liddell in the appearance chart, Liddell with 43 (40 league, 3 cup) and Baron with 41 (40 league, 1 cup). Kevin also chipped in with 6 goals.

He went on to appear another 44 times over the next 2 seasons, before leaving Liverpool in May 1954; he moved on to Southend United. He later played for Northampton Town, before dropping into non-league football with Gravesend & Northfleet, Wisbech Town, Aldershot, Cambridge City, Bedford Town and Maldon Town.

He died in June 1971 at the age of 44.

=== Career details ===
- Liverpool F.C. (1945–1954) - 153 appearances, 32 goals - FA Cup runners-up medal (1950).

== Family ==
Eighteen years after Baron's death, his older brother Gerard was the oldest victim of the Hillsborough disaster on 15 April 1989, at age 67, when 96 Liverpool fans were crushed to death at the FA Cup semi-final (the death toll eventually reached 97).

== Honours ==
Liverpool

- FA Cup runner-up: 1949–50
