= Ray Minshull (footballer) =

English footballer

Personal information
- Full name: Raymond Minshull
- Date of birth: 15 July 1920
- Place of birth: Bolton, England
- Date of death: 15 February 2005 (aged 84)
- Place of death: Southport, England
- Position: Goalkeeper

Senior career*
Years	Team	Apps	(Gls)
1946–1951	Liverpool	28	(0)
1951–1957	Southport	217	(0)
1957–1959	Bradford Park Avenue	28	(0)
Total		273	(0)
- * Club domestic league appearances and goals

Raymond Minshull (15 July 1920 – 15 February 2005) was an English footballer who played as a goalkeeper for Liverpool in The Football League. Minshull signed for Liverpool in 1946 and made 6 appearances during the 1946–47 season. He was never able to cement his place in the first-team ahead of regular goalkeeper Cyril Sidlow and left the club in 1951 to join Southport.

He was the player-manager of the newly-formed Wigan Rovers during their inaugural season in the Cheshire League in 1959–60.

Ray Minshull died in 2005.
