= Jimmy Payne =

English footballer

James Bolcherson Payne (10 March 1926 – 22 January 2013) was a professional footballer, and one of a select number of players to have played for both Liverpool and Everton.

== Life and playing career ==
Born Bootle, Lancashire, Payne was a boyhood Everton fan, but it was with local rivals Liverpool that an 18-year-old Payne signed his first professional contract in 1944, and it was here that he spent the majority of his career. From his debut in 1948 to his departure in 1956 he made 244 appearances as a skilful right-winger.

Payne's, belated, debut came on 11 September 1948 when the 22-year-old started on the right wing at Anfield against Bolton Wanderers who returned to Burnden Park with the 2 points after a 1–0 victory, his first goal came a month later, again, in a league match at Anfield, this time Chelsea were the visitors and took a point back to Stamford Bridge after a 1-1, they 3 minutes away from taking both the points away with them but Payne's late reply saved Liverpool's blushes.

Jimmy appeared in all of Liverpool's 6 FA Cup matches during their 1950 run to their first Wembley final including a 2-0 Semi-final victory over derby rivals Everton at Maine Road, Manchester. Payne got the nod to start the 7th match, the showcase final on 29 April against Arsenal.

Payne would have probably bettered his tally that but for injuries in his latter years. In April 1956 he moved to the club he supported as a boy, Everton, for a fee of around £3,000 but after only 6 games injuries forced him to retire still short of his 30th birthday. Jimmy became a newsagent upon retirement. M Never selected at senior level for England, Payne did appear for his country at B level.

== Career detail ==
- Liverpool F.C. (1944–1956) - 243 appearances, 43 goals - FA Cup runners-up medal (1950)
- Everton F.C (1956) - 6 appearances

== Honours ==
Liverpool

- FA Cup runner-up: 1949–50
