= Bill Shepherd (English footballer) =

English footballer

Bill Shepherd (25 September 1920 – January 1983) was an English professional footballer, who played as a full-back for Liverpool in the Football League. Shepherd signed for Liverpool from Elm Park in 1948. He was a regular in the starting lineup during his first season at the club as he made 41 appearances during the 1948–49 season. However, during his next three seasons at the club he was only a bit-part player, making only 13 appearances before he left in 1952. He joined Lancashire Combination side Wigan Athletic, where he made 11 appearances during his one season at the club. He finished his career as player manager at Runcorn Town where he took his team off the pitch in a game against Witton Albion when he categorically stated that the ball had entered the goal through a hole in the net. Bill is survived by his son Graham, who works in the Aerospace industry and is also a semi-professional musician.
