= Bryan Williams (English footballer) =

English footballer (1927–2019)

Robert Bryan Williams (4 October 1927 – April 2019) was an English footballer who played as a midfielder for Liverpool in the Football League. He was born in Liverpool in October 1927. Williams played for amateur side South Liverpool before he signed for Liverpool in 1949. During his four seasons at the club he was unable to cement a place in the starting lineup and eventually moved to Crewe Alexandra in 1953. He later played for Rhyl.
