= Charlie Ashcroft =

English footballer

Personal information
- Full name: Charles Thomas Ashcroft
- Date of birth: 3 July 1926
- Place of birth: Chorley, England
- Date of death: 13 March 2010 (aged 83)
- Position: Goalkeeper

Youth career
- Eccleston Juniors

Senior career*
Years	Team	Apps	(Gls)
1946–1955	Liverpool	87	(0)
1955–1957	Ipswich Town	7	(0)
1957–1958	Coventry City	19	(0)
1958–1962	Chorley		(0)
Total		113	(0)

International career
1952	England B	1	(0)
- * Club domestic league appearances and goals

Charlie Ashcroft (3 July 1926 – 13 March 2010) was an English footballer.

His first club was Eccleston Juniors, whom he left in May 1946 for Liverpool. He stayed with them for nine years, appearing 87 times.

In June 1955 he signed for Ipswich Town, staying for only a season before leaving for Coventry City, his last club.

He died at the age of 83 in March 2010.
