= Eddie Spicer =

English footballer

Personal information
- Full name: Edwin Warren Spicer
- Date of birth: 20 September 1922
- Place of birth: Garston, Liverpool, England
- Date of death: 25 December 2004 (aged 82)
- Place of death: Rhyl, Wales
- Position: Defender

Senior career*
Years	Team	Apps	(Gls)
1939–1953	Liverpool		
- * Club domestic league appearances and goals

Edwin Warren Spicer (20 September 1922 – 25 December 2004) was an English professional footballer who played as a defender.

== Career ==
Born in Liverpool, England, the 17-year-old Spicer signed professional forms for Liverpool in October 1939 after impressing manager George Kay. Like so many professional players, Spicer's career was interrupted by the outbreak of the Second World War and due to this his "official" debut was seven years after he first signed.

Immediately after World War II, in which Spicer served in the Marines, he returned to Liverpool and was finally given his debut on 30 January 1946 in the first post-war competition the FA Cup. It was a fourth round second leg tie at Anfield, a game the Reds won 2–0. Unfortunately for both Spicer and Liverpool, opponents Bolton Wanderers had already won the first leg 5–0, subsequently knocking Liverpool out of the cup.

Spicer had to wait until 6 December 1947 for his first goal for the club, Aston Villa were the visitors to Anfield for a league game that ended in a 3–3 draw.

Spicer made ten appearances during Liverpool's first championship winning team for 24 years in 1946–47, just short of the total required to gain himself a medal. His only medal came in the FA Cup of 1950, Spicer appeared in all of Liverpool's seven matches, including the final on 29 April, the team's first ever Wembley final. Arsenal were the opposition and won 2–0.

Spicer was a tough, no-nonsense defender, primarily left-sided, and he was a regular fixture in the Liverpool side during the late 1940s and early 1950s. He suffered with injuries, however, missing the entire 1951–52 season with a broken leg, and suffering the same injury in 1953, an injury that would eventually end his career prematurely.

Despite suffering numerous injuries throughout his career, Spicer managed 168 appearances for Liverpool, scoring twice.

== Personal life ==
Spicer was the son of George Spicer and Ethel Anne (née Warren). He married Norma Roberts in March 1946 in Wrexham. They had two children.

== Statistics ==
- Liverpool F.C. (1939–1953) - 168 appearances, 2 goals

== Honours ==
Liverpool

- FA Cup runner-up: 1949–50
