= Ken Brierley =

English footballer

Personal information
- Date of birth: 3 April 1926
- Place of birth: Ashton-under-Lyne, England
- Date of death: February 2004 (aged 77)

Senior career*
Years	Team	Apps	(Gls)
- Range Boilers
1946–1948	Oldham Athletic	58	(5)
1948–1953	Liverpool	58	(8)
1953–1955	Oldham Athletic	67	(5)
- Stalybridge Celtic
1956–1958	Mossley		

Managerial career
- 1956–1957: Mossley
- * Club domestic league appearances and goals

Ken Brierley (3 April 1926 – February 2004) was an English professional footballer who played as a midfielder for Liverpool in The Football League.

== Playing career ==
Brierley joined Oldham Athletic from Range Boilers in 1946 and went on to make 58 league appearances before he signed for Liverpool. He signed for Liverpool in February 1948, and made 10 appearances during the remainder of the 1947–48 season. Brierley was unable to establish him in the starting lineup during his time at the club and moved back to Oldham in March 1953. He left Oldham in 1955, dropping into non-League football with Stalybridge Celtic. In August 1956 he joined Mossley and went on to make 78 appearances in the next two season.

== Coaching career ==
In October 1956 he was appointed manager of Mossley. However, after winning only four of his 23 matches in charge, he was replaced by Pat Murphy.
