= John Heydon (footballer) =

English footballer

John Heydon (19 October 1928 - September 2012) was an English footballer who played as a midfielder for Liverpool in The Football League. Heydon signed for Liverpool when he was 20 years old in 1949, although he would have to wait until the 1950–51 season before he made his debut. He made 63 appearances in total during the next three seasons but was unable to become a regular in the starting lineup and moved to Millwall in 1953.
