= Bob Paisley =

English footballer and manager (1919–1996)

Bob Paisley OBE

Personal information
- Full name: Robert Paisley
- Date of birth: 23 January 1919
- Place of birth: Hetton-le-Hole, County Durham, England
- Date of death: 14 February 1996 (aged 77)
- Place of death: Liverpool, Merseyside, England
- Height: 5 ft 7 in (1.70 m)
- Position: Left-half

Senior career*
Years	Team	Apps	(Gls)
1937–1939	Bishop Auckland		
1939–1954	Liverpool	253	(10)

Managerial career
- 1959–1973: Liverpool (assistant manager)
- 1974–1983: Liverpool
- * Club domestic league appearances and goals

Robert Paisley (23 January 1919 – 14 February 1996) was an English professional football manager and player who played as a wing-half. He spent almost 50 years with Liverpool and is regarded as one of the greatest managers of all time. Reluctantly taking the job in 1974, he built on the foundations laid by his predecessor Bill Shankly and went on to become the most successful English manager in history. Paisley is the first of five managers to have won the European Cup three times. He is also one of five managers to have won the English top-flight championship as both a player and manager at the same club.

Paisley came from a small County Durham mining community and, in his youth, played for Bishop Auckland, before he signed for Liverpool in 1939. During the Second World War he served in the British Army, and could not make his Liverpool debut until 1946. In the 1946–47 season, he was a member of the Liverpool team that won the First Division title for the first time in 24 years. He was made club captain in 1951, and remained with Liverpool until he retired from playing in 1954.

He stayed with the club, and took on the two roles of reserve team coach and club physiotherapist. By this time, Liverpool had been relegated to the Second Division and its facilities were in decline. Shankly was appointed Liverpool manager in December 1959, and he promoted Paisley to work alongside him as his assistant in a management/coaching team that included Joe Fagan and Reuben Bennett. Under their leadership, the fortunes of Liverpool turned around dramatically and, in the 1961–62 season, the team gained promotion back to the First Division. Paisley filled an important role as tactician under Shankly's leadership, and the team won numerous honours during the next twelve seasons.

In 1974, Shankly retired as manager and, despite Paisley's own initial reluctance, he was appointed as Shankly's successor. He went on to lead Liverpool through a period of domestic and European dominance, winning twenty honours in nine seasons: six League Championships, three League Cups, six Charity Shields, three European Cups, one UEFA Cup and one UEFA Super Cup. He won honours at a rate of 2.2 per season, an English record. At the time of his retirement he had won the Manager of the Year Award a record six times. Paisley retired from management in 1983 and was succeeded by Joe Fagan. He died in 1996, aged 77, after having Alzheimer's disease for several years. In 2002, Paisley was among the six managers who were inaugural inductees into the English Football Hall of Fame.

== Early life ==
Robert Paisley was born on 23 January 1919 in the small County Durham coal mining village of Hetton-le-Hole. Paisley described it as "a close-knit community where coal was king and football was religion". His father Sam was a miner and his mother Emily a housewife. They had four sons: Willie, Bob, Hugh and Alan in age order. On the day Paisley was born, 150,000 miners nationwide went on strike for a shorter working week. Paisley attended a local school until he was thirteen and, like his friends there, had to rely on soup kitchens to supplement a meagre diet. In 1926, during the General Strike when he was seven, he had to scramble over slag heaps to collect coal dust that his parents could mix with water to create a crude fuel. Life was difficult for working-class families and, as Paisley recalled: "We lived in a small terraced house, and although we never went short of life's essentials, there was never much money left over by the end of the week".

Paisley was an outstanding footballer at Eppleton Primary School and helped his team win seventeen trophies in a four-year period. Throughout his playing career, he was a left half. After leaving school at the age of 14, Paisley initially worked alongside his father at the pit and was there when his father had an underground accident which rendered him unable to work for five years. The mine was closed down and he trained to become a bricklayer.

Paisley had joined Hetton Football Club after leaving school in 1933 and continued to attract notice as a member of their junior team. He had a boyhood dream of playing for Sunderland but when he was recommended to them by Hetton he was rejected as being "too small". Instead, he signed for Bishop Auckland before the 1937–38 season for three shillings and sixpence per match.

== Bishop Auckland and arrival at Liverpool ==
Paisley played for "the Bishops" for two seasons until he was signed by Liverpool in May 1939, a few months after his twentieth birthday. The Bishops were one of the top non-league teams in England and Paisley called them "the Kings of Amateur Football". In Paisley's second season with them, they achieved a treble by winning the Northern League championship, the FA Amateur Cup and the Durham County Challenge Cup. The FA Amateur Cup final was played in nearby Sunderland at Roker Park where the Bishops defeated Willington 3–0 after extra time. During the season, Paisley was approached by Liverpool manager George Kay and promised that he would sign for Liverpool at the end of the season. He kept his promise even though Sunderland reconsidered and made another approach.

Paisley's last match for the Bishops was on Saturday, 6 May 1939 in the Durham County Challenge Cup final against South Shields, also played at Roker Park. The following Monday, Paisley travelled by train to Liverpool where he was met at Exchange station by Andy McGuigan who accompanied him to Anfield. He signed his contract and began an association that would last half a century. His signing on fee was £25 and his wages were £8 a week in the season and £6 a week during the summer. He recalled: "I was full of beans that day, but it was very quiet really. I was met at the station and after that long trek up Scotland Road in a tramcar, I found there were only one or two youngsters at the ground – Billy Liddell, Eddie Spicer and Ray Lambert. The rest had been recruited for the territorials".

Following pre-season training, Paisley took part in two reserve team games at the start of the 1939–40 season but all competitions were cancelled after war was declared on 3 September. Paisley had got to know Matt Busby, who was then Liverpool's club captain and was grateful for the advice and encouragement which Busby gave him. Paisley said that Busby was "a man you could look up to and respect".

On 8 September 1939, the British Government advised The Football Association (the FA) that clubs could stage friendly matches outside evacuation areas and Liverpool were able to take part in such matches, constrained by unavailability of players in the services, throughout the war. Liverpool's first wartime friendly was at Sealand Road against Chester on 16 September. Paisley took part in 34 of these matches between 1939 and 1941, scoring ten goals.

== Second World War ==
Paisley was twenty when the Second World War began and in October he was called up into the Army who assigned him to the Royal Artillery in which he was a gunner in the 73rd Medium Regiment. This regiment was a war-formed battery unit utilising medium range artillery (field guns) that saw service in the United Kingdom until August 1941, North Africa until 1944 and finally Italy until 1945.

Paisley was stationed at several camps throughout Great Britain including one at Rhyl. For a long time, he was stationed at a camp near Tarporley in Cheshire which was about thirty miles from Anfield. Stan Liversedge describes one occasion when Paisley was given clearance by the Army to play for Liverpool against Everton in the 1940 Liverpool Senior Cup final. To get there, he had to use his bicycle and cycle nearly the whole way. He left the bike in Birkenhead and hitched a lift through the Mersey Tunnel. After the match, he had to do the same journey in reverse to return to camp. Although it was a relatively unimportant match of local interest only, Paisley recalled that "an estimated 30,000 turned up". Everton, the reigning league champions, won the match 4–2. That was Paisley's first encounter with Everton. He got his revenge soon afterwards on 1 April 1940 when he played alongside Matt Busby and Billy Liddell in a depleted Liverpool team who "sprang a surprise" by defeating Everton 3–1 at Goodison Park.

John Keith recounts that Paisley's football skills saved him from a posting to the Far East which would inevitably have resulted in his becoming a prisoner of war of the Japanese. He was captain of the 73rd's team and, when his battery was due to be posted, his commanding officer transferred him to another battery so that he could remain in Britain and lead the regimental team. His old unit was subsequently overrun by the Japanese.

At the end of August 1941, on the bank holiday, Paisley was posted overseas and did not return to England until 1945. He went in a troopship to Egypt, the voyage lasting ten weeks because they had to sail around South Africa. He spent Christmas in Egypt and then received his first mail from England which turned out to be a postcard from George Kay asking him if he would be available to play for Liverpool against Preston North End (Bill Shankly's team) in the season opener three months earlier. While he was in Egypt, Paisley became interested in horse racing through friendship with jockey Reg Stretton and trainer Frank Carr. Paisley learned to ride himself and he retained this interest after the war, often studying form in his spare moments.

He was stationed south of Cairo and learned to drive a 15 cwt. truck. More importantly, he had a month's training on firing anti-tank guns, a skill he needed in the desert as a member of the Eighth Army in Operation Crusader which relieved the Siege of Tobruk. During periods of leave from the conflict, Paisley returned to Cairo where he was mostly involved in team sports, not only football but also cricket and hockey. He represented the Combined Services football team as well as playing for his regiment. Paisley was involved in the Second Battle of El Alamein and subsequently fought his way across North Africa until the final defeat of the Afrika Korps in 1943. He only suffered an injury once when he was temporarily blinded by sand sprayed into his face by explosive bullets fired from an aircraft during a Luftwaffe attack on his unit.

In 1943, Paisley went with the Eighth Army into Sicily and then into Italy. Whilst he was on active service in Italy he received the news that his younger brother Alan, aged fifteen, had died at home from scarlet fever and diphtheria. In June 1944, Paisley took part in the liberation of Rome and rode into the city on top of a tank, an event he recalled 33 years later when Liverpool won the 1977 European Cup final in Rome's Stadio Olimpico. Paisley's regiment moved on to Florence where they encamped at ACF Fiorentina's Stadio Artemio Franchi. In Florence, Paisley saw boxing exhibitions by Joe Louis and Sugar Ray Robinson which generated another sporting interest and one for which he and Bill Shankly shared a passion while they worked together.

Paisley finally returned to England in 1945 and was stationed at Woolwich Arsenal until he was demobbed. Shortly before that, he met his future wife Jessie, a schoolteacher, on a train at Maghull. She recalled her father being unimpressed that she had met a soldier who was a professional footballer in civilian life so she added that Paisley had worked as a bricklayer too. Her father said: "Oh, that's a proper job so that's alright then". On 17 July 1946, Bob and Jessie were married in Liverpool at All Souls Church, Springwood. They raised a family of two sons and one daughter: Robert, Graham and Christine. The family always lived in Liverpool and Jessie outlived Bob by sixteen years until she died in the early hours of 8 February 2012 as the result of a heart infection, aged 96.

== Liverpool playing career ==
In the 1945–46 season, the Football League decided not to revive the championship programme as, with the war only recently concluded, many players were still in the forces and travel could still be difficult to arrange. Instead they organised North and South divisions on a geographical basis to keep travel to a minimum and enable clubs to re-establish themselves without the pressure of official competition. The FA Cup was staged but all ties up to the quarter-final stage were played over two legs to increase the number of meaningful matches in the season.

Paisley went on to make 277 appearances for the club and was an integral player in the 1946–47 championship-winning side.

— Liverpool F.C. profile.

Paisley made his official debut on 5 January 1946 in Liverpool's first post-war competitive match, which was an FA Cup 3rd round, 1st leg away match at Sealand Road, the home ground of Chester. Liverpool won the game 2–0. Paisley's league debut would be against Chelsea at Anfield on 7 September 1946, a game Liverpool won 7–4. His first goal came on 1 May 1948 in a league game at Anfield, against Wolverhampton Wanderers. Paisley's 22nd-minute strike along with a late Jack Balmer goal were enough to help the Reds win 2–1.

In the first full season after the war, 1946–47, featuring in a Liverpool side that included the prolific Albert Stubbins and Balmer in attack with Billy Liddell on the wing, Paisley helped Liverpool to their first league title since 1923, making 34 appearances in the 42-match season. He remained a fixture in the side, appearing in over 30 matches in 1947–48 and 1948–49 and 28 in 1949–50, a season of both highs and lows for Paisley who scored the opening goal of a 2–0 FA Cup semi-final win over Merseyside rivals Everton, a result which saw Liverpool reach their first FA Cup final since 1914, only to sustain an injury and be unavailable for all the games leading up to the final against Arsenal, the club's first appearance at Wembley, for which he was not selected. Paisley later said that the experience stood him in good stead when it came to telling players they were not going to play in big games as he knew how they felt. Paisley became club captain the following season. He played his last match for the club in March 1954 before retiring.

== Coaching career ==
After retiring in 1954, Paisley joined the Liverpool back room staff as a self-taught physiotherapist and was said to have the knack of being able to diagnose a player's injury just by looking at them. He later became the reserve team coach and then, in August 1959 when Albert Shelley retired, first team trainer. The arrival of Bill Shankly as manager in December 1959 transformed the fortunes of the club and Paisley recalled that "from the moment he arrived, we got on like a house on fire". On his first day in charge, Shankly held a meeting with the coaching staff which consisted of Paisley, Reuben Bennett and Joe Fagan to tell them that he was not bringing in his own coaches. He wanted to work with them and so guaranteed them their jobs, with sportswriter John Keith saying this decision by Shankly displayed "remarkable football foresight". Shankly pointed out that he would decide the training strategy and they must all work together with absolutely loyalty to each other and to the club. Under Phil Taylor, training had been the traditional slog of physical exercise and road running. Shankly insisted on training which was "based on speed and using the ball". Five-a-side games were introduced as a key part of the strategy. Paisley had always been keen on training with the ball and was, like Fagan and Bennett, delighted to implement Shankly's methods. Fagan is credited with converting a storage area at Anfield into a "common room" for the coaches and it became the now-legendary Boot Room. Shankly began a Liverpool tradition, later upheld by Paisley and Fagan, of holding daily meetings in there to discuss strategy, tactics, training and players.

Training strategy was key to Liverpool's success in the 1960s and afterwards. There was more to it than using the ball and playing five-a-side matches. Influenced by Paisley, Fagan and Bennett, Shankly cottoned on to the importance of allowing players to cool down after training before having a bath or shower. Paisley, as a trained physiotherapist, argued that a person needs to cool down for about forty minutes after heavy exercise because, if they go into a bath while still sweating, their pores remain open and they are more susceptible to chills and strains. Fagan had advocated getting changed at Anfield before going via team bus to the club's training complex at Melwood. They would return to bath, change and eat. This routine satisfied the need for a cooling down period and had the added advantages of encouraging team bonding during the two journeys and ensuring familiarity with Anfield, an important need for them as home team. Everton, by contrast, did everything at their Bellefield training complex and their players only went to Goodison Park for home matches every two weeks or so. Shankly claimed that the cooling down period resulted in "an astonishing lack of injuries over many seasons". For example, in 1965–66 when Liverpool won the league title and reached the European Cup Winners' Cup final, they only used fourteen players in the entire season.

Shankly's biographer Stephen F. Kelly describes Paisley as "the perfect number two: never a threat to Shankly but always offering wise counsel". Paisley was an unassuming character and "happy to play second fiddle", but Kelly recognises his influence because although Shankly was "the great motivating force behind Liverpool, it was Paisley who was the tactician". As two entirely different characters who nonetheless complemented each other, John Keith said: "Bob once remarked that while Shanks wore steel tips on his shoes so people knew he was coming, he preferred to wear carpet slippers."

Under Shankly's management over the next fifteen years with Paisley as his assistant, Liverpool won three First Division league titles, one Second Division League title, two FA Cups and one UEFA Cup.

== Liverpool manager ==
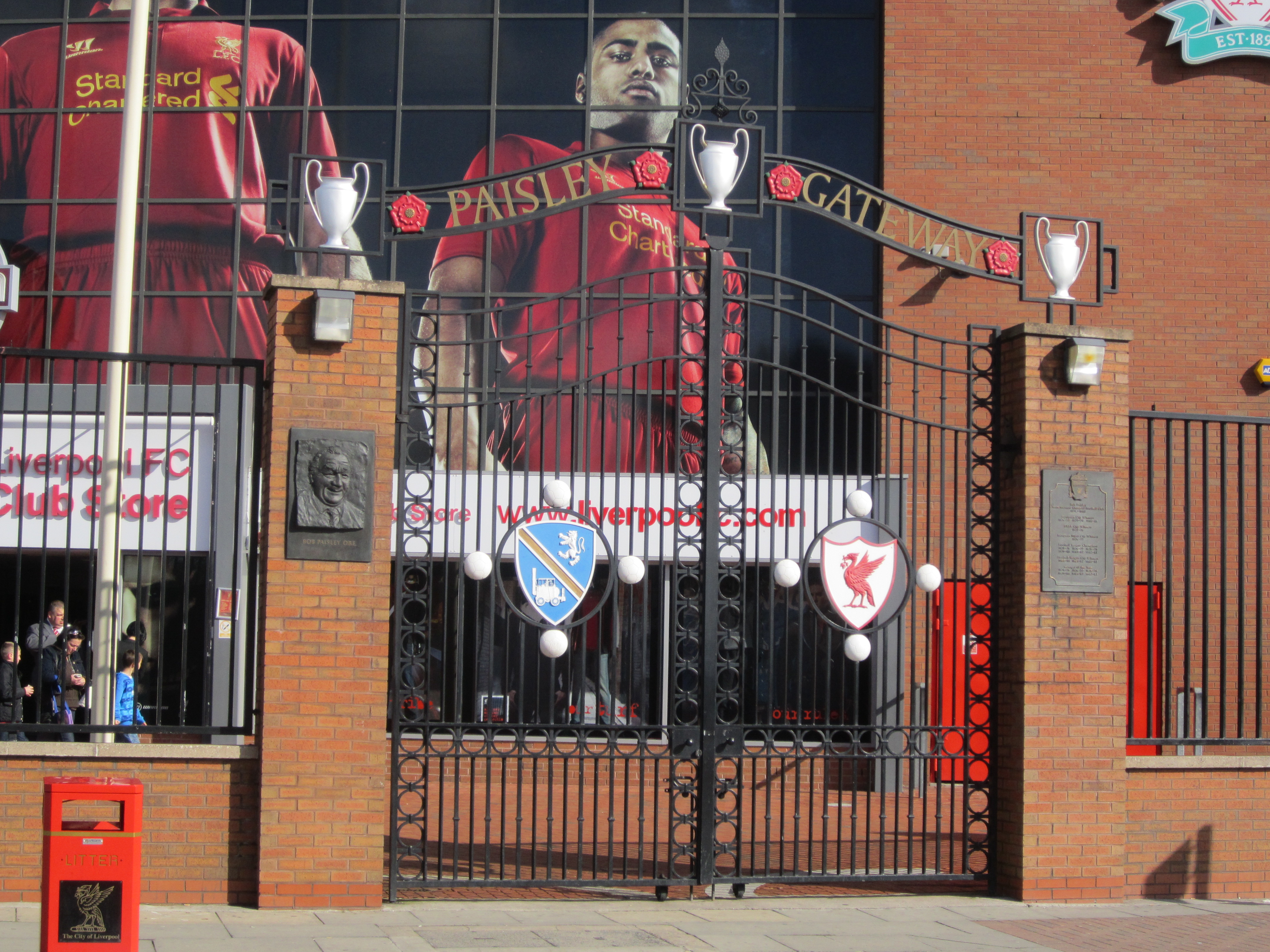
The Paisley Gateway was erected in 1999 at one of the entrances to Anfield. It includes a depiction of the record three European Cups he won during his tenure as manager, the crest of his birthplace in Hetton-le-Hole, and the crest of Liverpool F.C.

Following victory in the 1974 FA Cup final, Shankly unexpectedly announced his retirement; the Liverpool directors appointed Paisley as his replacement in the hope of maintaining continuity. Though initially reluctant to take on the role, Paisley became a huge success and, apart from his first season, won at least one major trophy in each of his nine years as manager.

With characteristic modesty, Paisley was reluctant to assume the reins and urged Shankly – an almost Messiah-like figure on Merseyside and a seemingly impossible act to follow – to change his mind and carry on. But though he regretted it later, Shankly was not for turning and Paisley announced, humbly, that he would do his best. Nine years later, he retired as the most successful boss in English football history, having led the Reds to six League Championships, three European Cups, one UEFA Cup and three League Cups.

— Ivan Ponting, The Independent, February 1996.

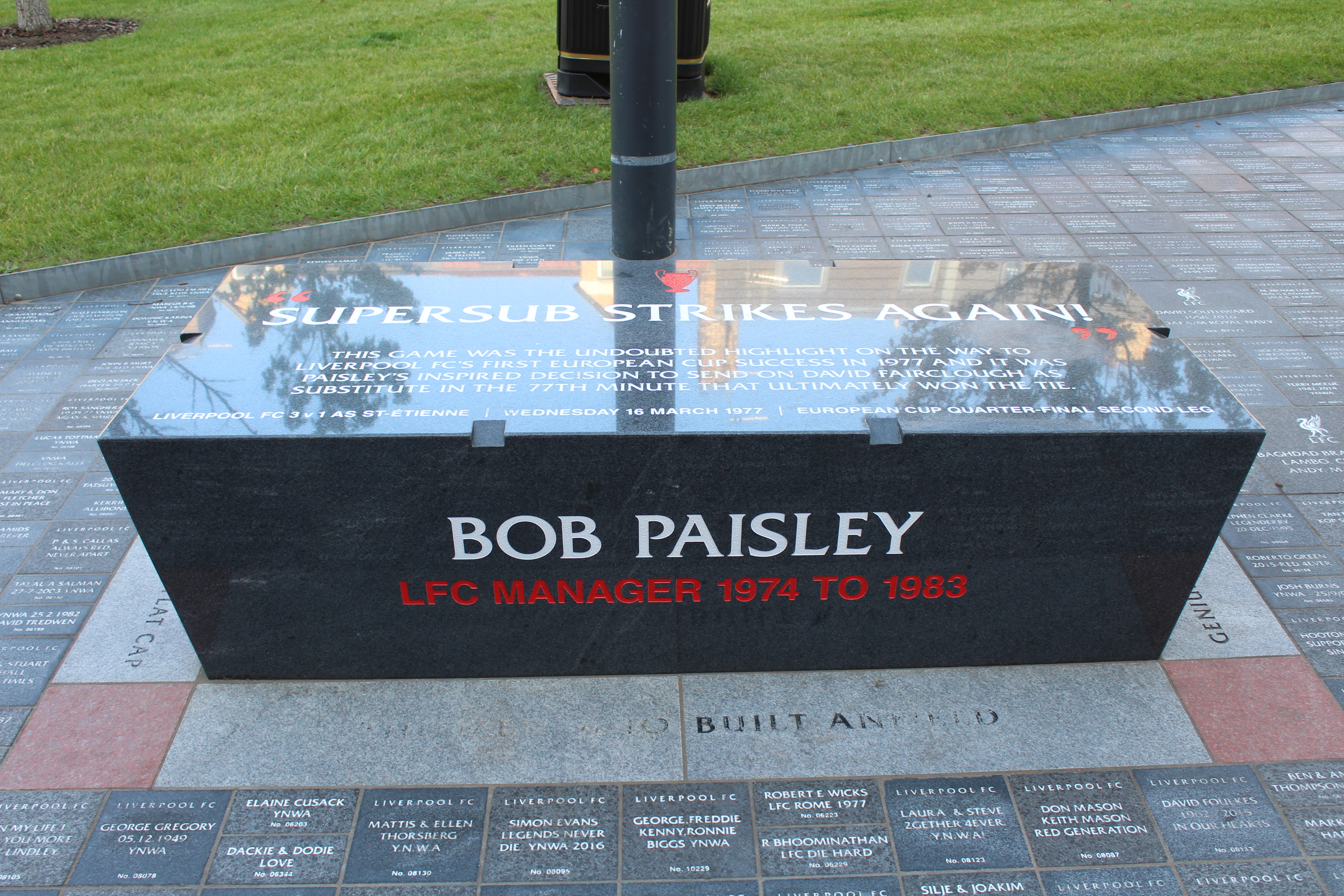
Paisley's plinth outside Anfield, installed in 2018, with a reference to the European Cup quarter-final against St Etienne in 1977 when Paisley's 70th minute substitute David Fairclough ("Supersub") scored the decisive goal

After finishing second in 1974–75, the team went on to win the league title and UEFA Cup in 1976. This period marked the beginning of Liverpool's dominance of English and European football, as the team went on to become champions on six occasions – finishing second twice – as well as winning three League Cups, one UEFA Cup, one UEFA Super Cup, and, most significantly, three European Cups. Apart from a fifth-place finish in 1981, Liverpool never finished lower than runners-up in the league with Paisley as manager. Achieving sustained success, Paisley, as Shankly's assistant, had learned a valuable lesson from Shankly's reluctance to drop his long-serving stars in the late 1960s, with Alan Kennedy, who scored winning goals in two European Cup finals under Paisley, stating:

Bob learned a lot from Shanks' reluctance to change an ageing Liverpool side in the late 1960s. Just after we won the European Cup against Real Madrid in 1981 he said the team needed freshening up and he went out and did it.

Between 1978 and 1981, Paisley's team went 63 league games unbeaten at Anfield, a club record until it was surpassed by Jürgen Klopp's Liverpool side in November 2020. Liverpool's dominance in England was primarily challenged by Nottingham Forest under Brian Clough, and Aston Villa under Ron Saunders and Tony Barton between 1977 and 1982. There were brief challenges from a number of other clubs, Ipswich Town under Bobby Robson in seasons 1980–81 and 1981–82, Manchester City under Tony Book in 1976–77, and Manchester United under Tommy Docherty in 1975–76 and 1976–77. Sharing Shankly's ability to see the potential in raw talent, Phil Neal, who Paisley signed from Northampton Town, praised Paisley's acquisitions from the lower leagues, among them "Ronnie Whelan from Irish League side Home Farm, striker Ian Rush from Chester".

During his tenure as Liverpool manager, Paisley oversaw several notable signings and transfers. In 1977, he signed Scottish International Kenny Dalglish from Celtic for a then British-record fee of £440,000, with Dalglish subsequently scoring the winning goal in the 1978 European Cup final. In January 1978, Paisley recruited Graeme Souness from Middlesbrough for approximately £350,000, with Souness later becoming Liverpool captain. In 1979, Paisly signed Israeli international Avi Cohen from Maccabi Telaviv for £200,000, making him the first israeli footballer to play for Liverpool, and Cohen later scored in the club's First Division title-winning match in May 1980. In April 1980, Paisley signed Welsh striker Ian Rush from Chester City for £300,000, with Rush subsequently becoming Liverpool's all-time leading goalscorer.

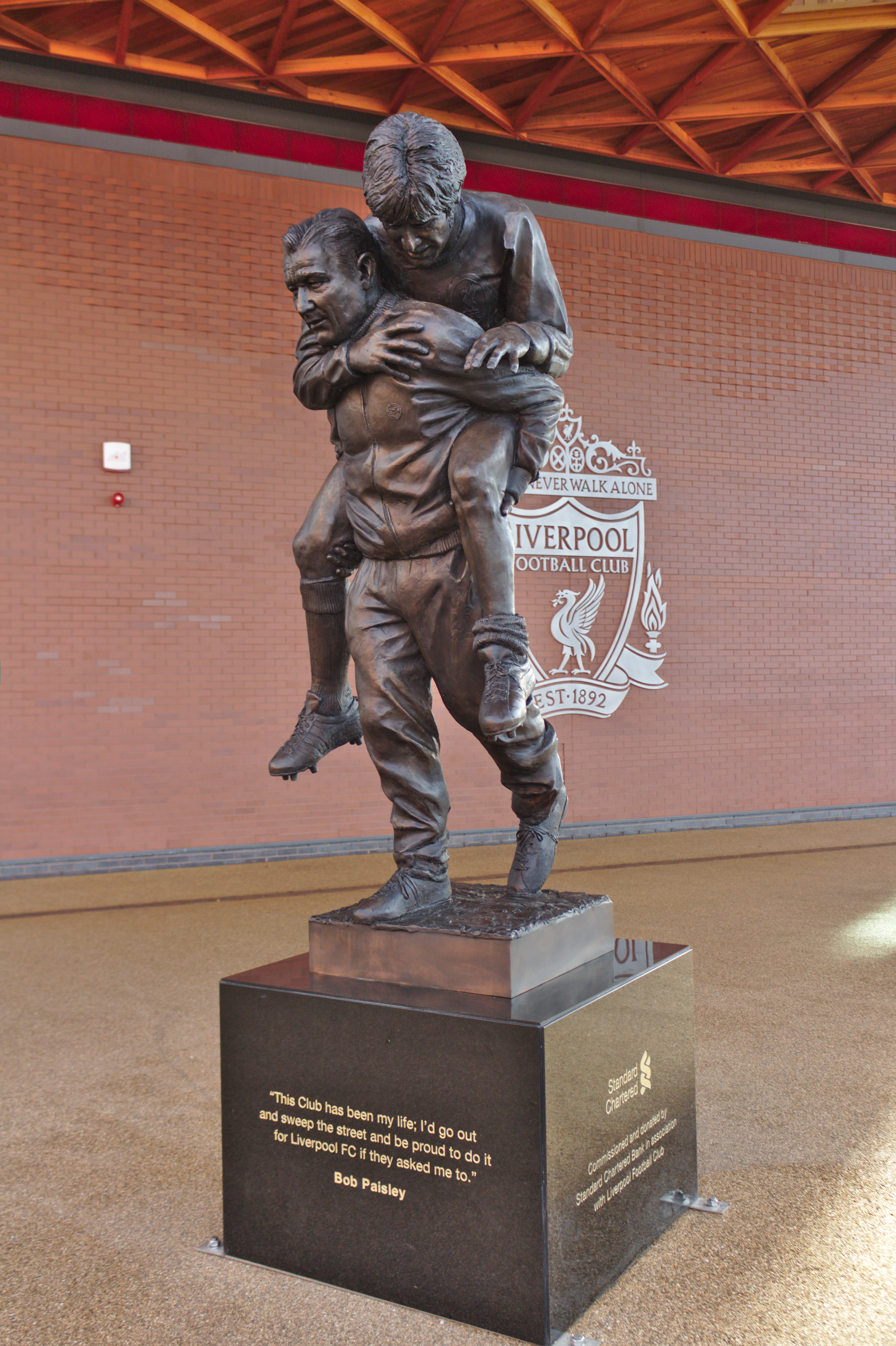
Statue of Paisley carrying an injured future Liverpool captain Emlyn Hughes (which took place in 1968) unveiled in 2020

Paisley, having won 20 trophies as Liverpool manager, remains, to this day, the most successful manager in the club's history and the most successful English manager of all time. He won honours at a rate of 2.2 per season, an English record. In Paisley's 44 years at Anfield as a player, coach and manager (1939 to 1983) he won 31 trophies. For the trophy presentation after Liverpool's 2–1 win over Manchester United in the 1983 League Cup final, his captain Graeme Souness stepped back and insisted that Paisley go up the steps at Wembley to collect the trophy in the manager's retirement season. In recognition of his managerial achievements with Liverpool, in 2002, Paisley was among the six managers who were inaugural inductees into the English Football Hall of Fame.

Paisley remained the only man in history to manage three European Cup winning sides until Carlo Ancelotti, Zinedine Zidane, Pep Guardiola and Luis Enrique matched the feat in 2014, 2018, 2023 and 2026 respectively. He also won an unprecedented six Manager of the Year Awards. The only trophies that Paisley failed to win as manager were the FA Cup, although Liverpool would be runners-up in the 1977 final, the European Cup Winners' Cup, and the Intercontinental Cup.

Paisley was the subject of This Is Your Life in 1977 when he was surprised by Eamonn Andrews on board a coach in central London, with those present on the show including his predecessor Shankly, teammate Billy Liddell, players who played for him, Emlyn Hughes and Tommy Smith, and comrades from the Second World War.

== Retirement from Liverpool ==
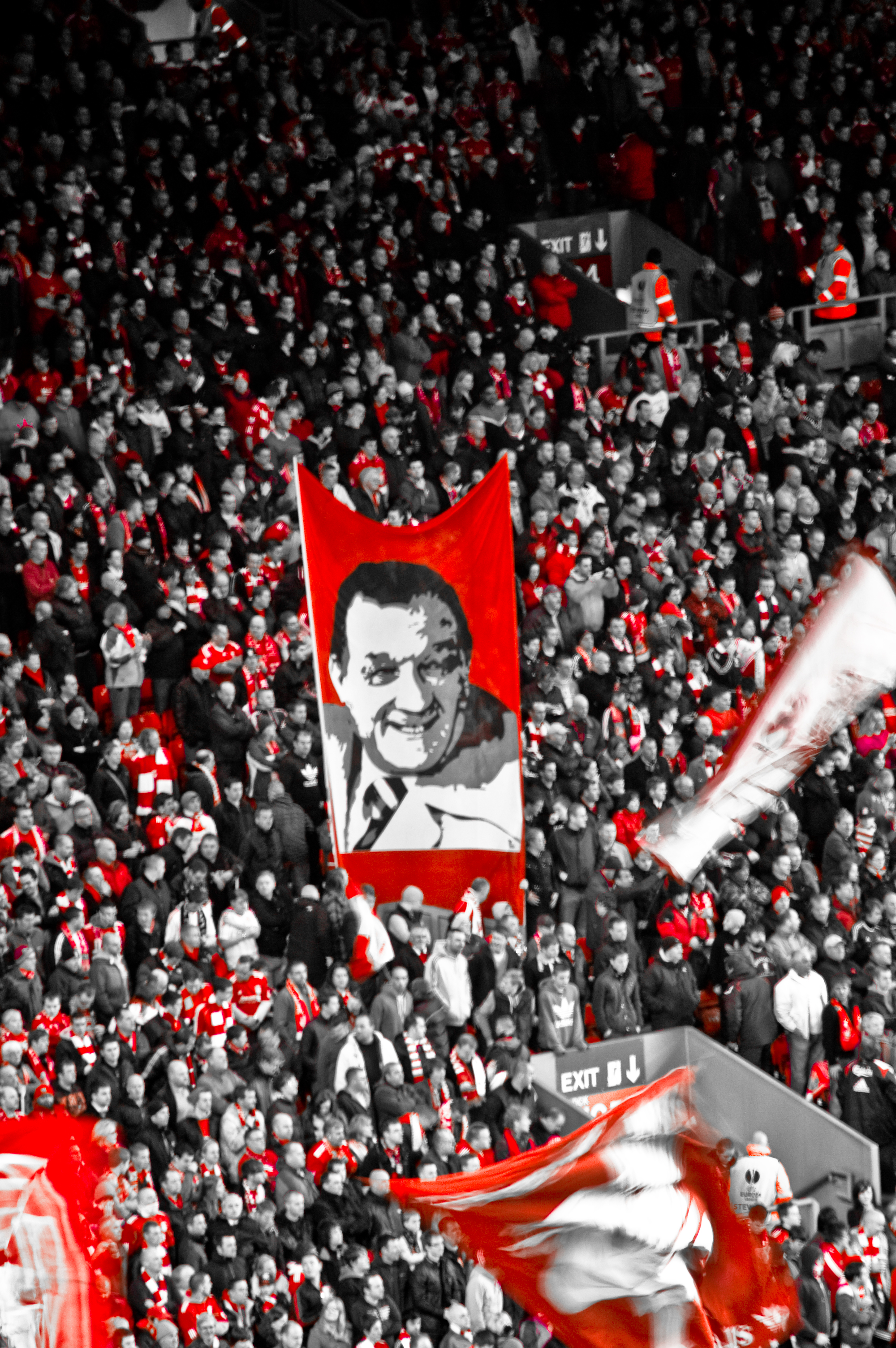
Liverpool fans with a banner depicting Paisley

Paisley retired as Liverpool manager at the end of the 1982–83 season, having spent 44 years at the club in various capacities. He was replaced by Joe Fagan, who would win Liverpool their fourth European Cup. Paisley worked informally as a consultant and advisor to Kenny Dalglish for two years after the latter's appointment as player-manager in 1985, before being appointed as a club director. According to John Keith:

He did become a director at the club, but he didn't interfere with the playing side, although he did become an advisor to Kenny Dalglish when he was player-manager. Kenny later said that "the biggest debt I owe in football is to Bob Paisley" because of the vast knowledge he shared with him.

In early 1986, then aged 66, Paisley was interviewed by the Football Association of Ireland with a view to taking charge of the Ireland football team. Jack Charlton was eventually given the job instead. Paisley continues to be remembered by supporters at Anfield, which includes featuring in banners, and he is honoured with the Paisley Gates outside the Kop at Anfield and would later be honoured with a plinth and a statue, with Emlyn Hughes, outside Anfield.

== Final years and legacy ==
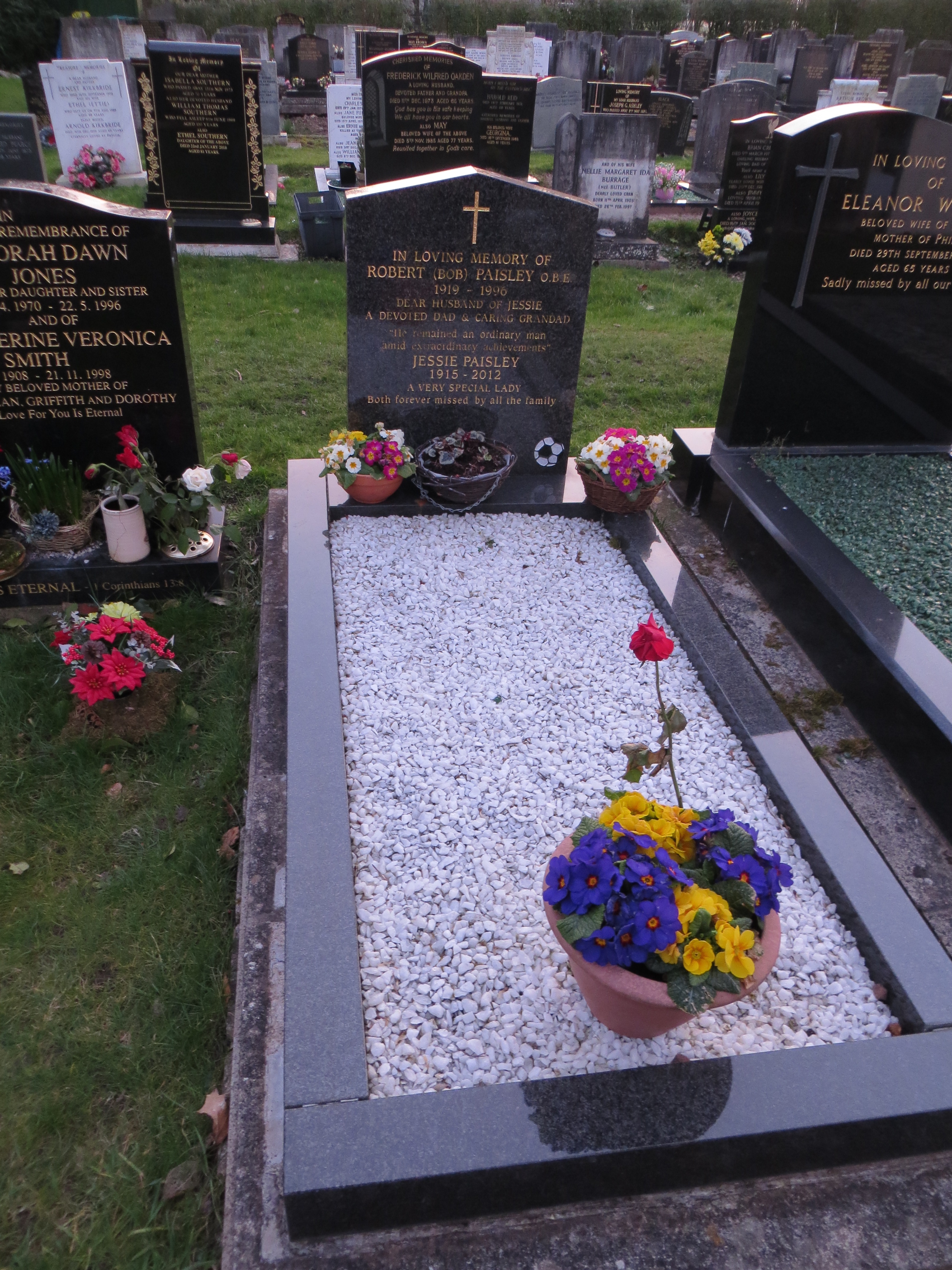
Paisley's grave in St Peter's Church, Woolton, Liverpool

Paisley continued to serve Liverpool as a director until he retired in early 1992 due to ill health, having been diagnosed with the early stages of Alzheimer's disease, something which had become apparent in his early seventies when he was unable to remember his way home when driving back from Anfield. He died on 14 February 1996 at the age of 77 in a nursing home on Merseyside.

Paisley was buried in the churchyard of St Peter's Church in Woolton, Liverpool. Following his death in 1996, Paisley was honoured by the club with the opening of the Paisley Gateway at one of the entrances to Anfield, complementing the existing Shankly Gates.

A further memorial to Paisley has been erected in the main park in his home town of Hetton-le-hole, while a memorial plaque was unveiled on his former home in Woolton, South Liverpool, in August 2026.

In January 2020, a statue which depicts a scene from 1968, when Paisley carried the injured future Liverpool captain Emlyn Hughes off the field, was unveiled outside Anfield. The plinth features a quote from Paisley: "This Club has been my life; I'd go out and sweep the street and be proud to do it for Liverpool FC if they asked me to." The 8 ft sculpture was unveiled by some of Paisley's players, including Ian Rush, Kenny Dalglish and Phil Thompson, with Liverpool chief executive Peter Moore calling it a "fitting tribute to his legacy". Paisley also features in the popular Liverpool chant "Allez, Allez, Allez", which is frequently sung by Liverpool supporters, especially during European matches.

== Personal life ==
Bob Paisley was married to his wife Jessie, a school teacher in Liverpool, from 1946 until his death 50 years later. They had two sons, Robert junior and Graham, and a daughter, Christine.

Jessie Paisley attended the celebrations to commemorate Liverpool's last game in front of the old Spion Kop terrace in 1994, but without her husband, who was not well enough to attend. Also in attendance that day were Paisley's successor Joe Fagan, and Agnes "Ness" Shankly, the widow of his predecessor Bill Shankly. Jessie Paisley died in February 2012 at the age of 96.

== Honours ==
=== Player ===
Liverpool

- Football League First Division: 1946–47

=== Manager ===
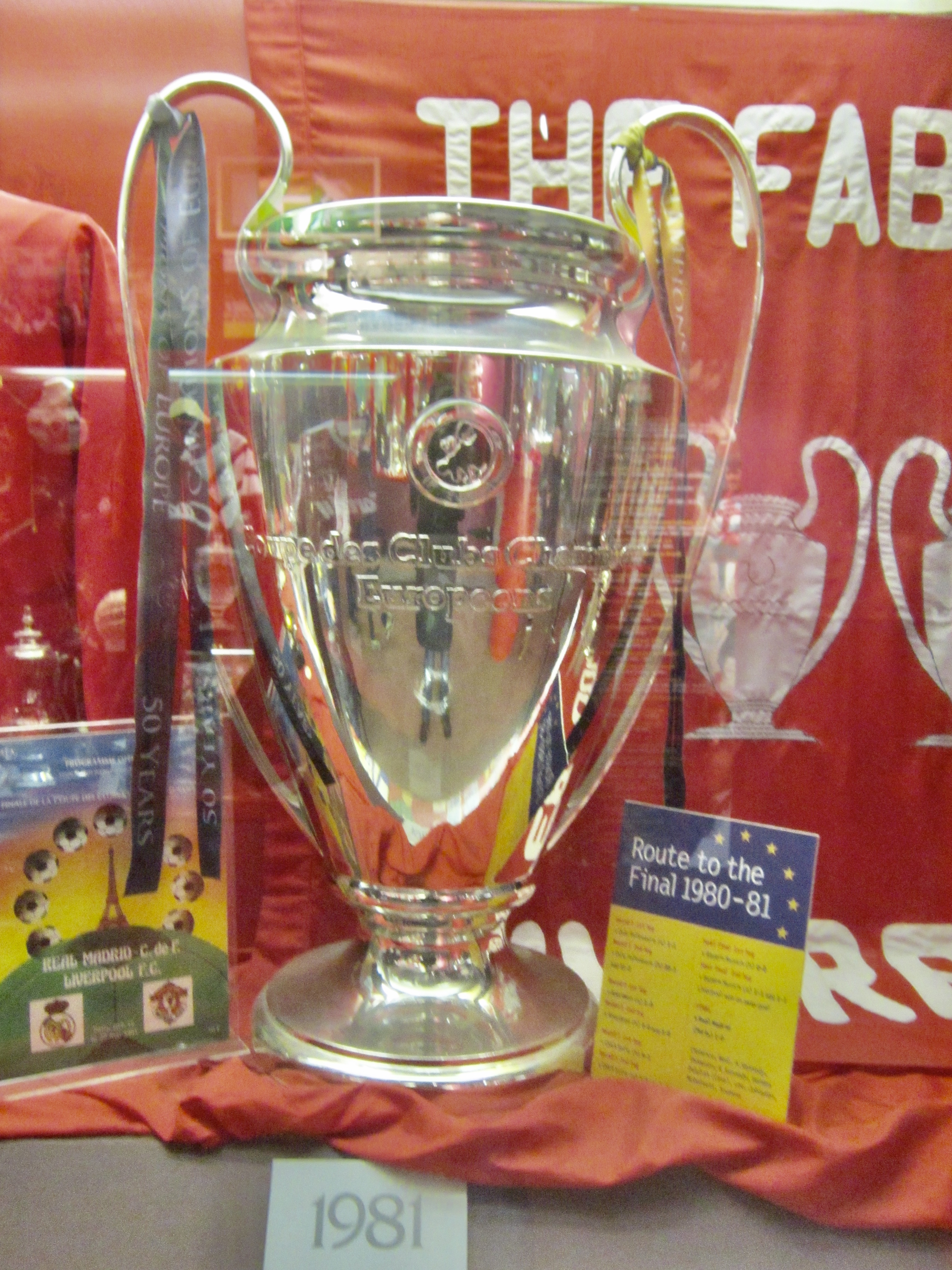
The 1981 European Cup, Paisley's third, in the Liverpool F.C. museum

Liverpool

- Football League First Division: 1975–76, 1976–77, 1978–79, 1979–80, 1981–82, 1982–83
- Football League Cup: 1980–81, 1981–82, 1982–83; runner-up: 1977–78
- FA Charity Shield: 1974, 1976, 1977, 1979, 1980, 1982
- European Cup: 1976–77, 1977–78, 1980–81
- UEFA Cup: 1975–76
- UEFA Super Cup: 1977
- FA Cup runner-up: 1976–77
- Intercontinental Cup runner-up: 1981

Individual

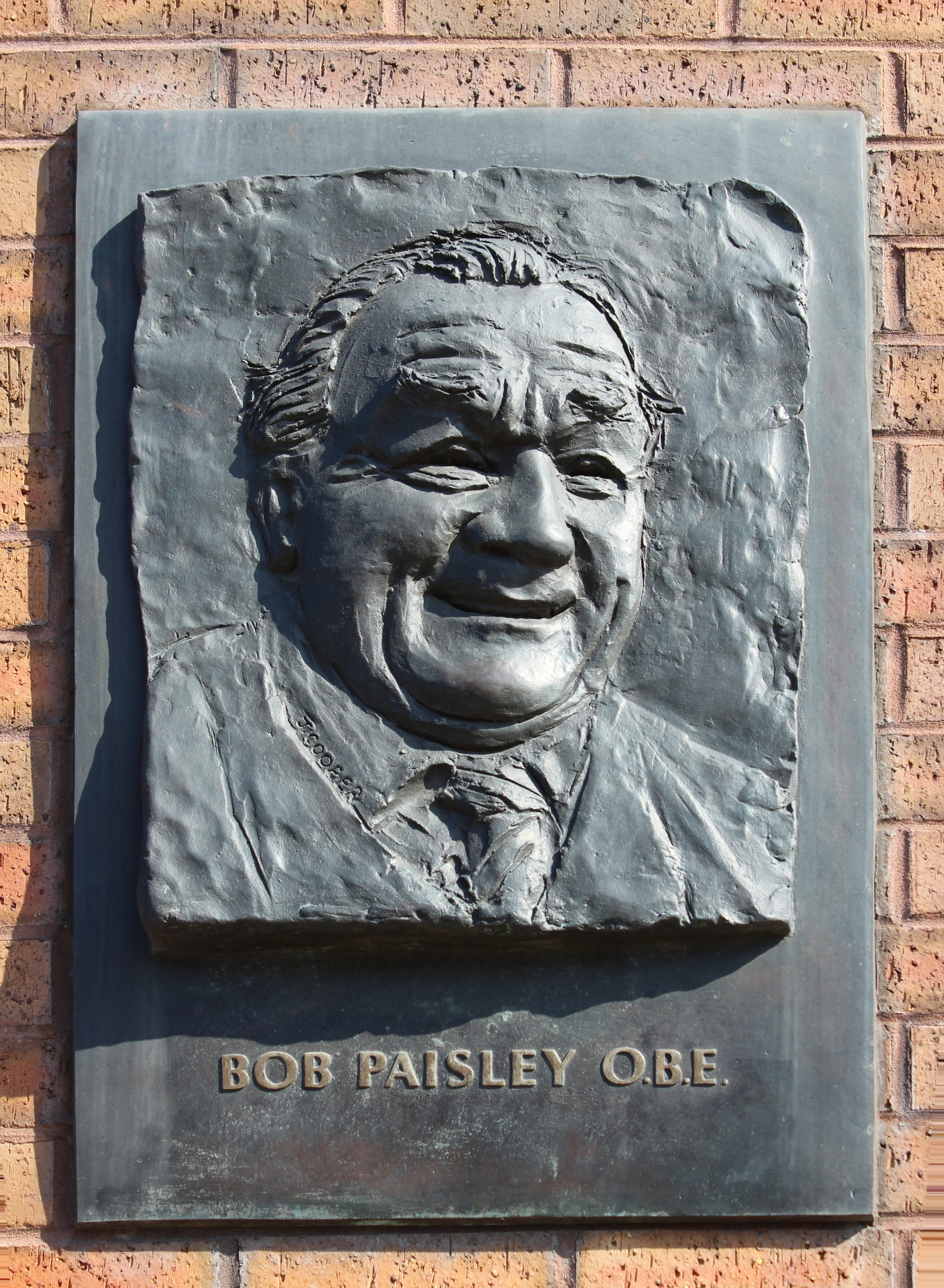
Plaque of Paisley at the Anfield gateway named in his honour

- Officer of the Order of the British Empire (OBE): 1983
- PFA Merit Award: 1983
- FWA Tribute Award: 1984
- English Football Hall of Fame (Manager): 2002
- Football Manager of the Year Award: 1975–76, 1976–77, 1978–79, 1979–80, 1981–82, 1982–83
- ESPN 4th Greatest Manager of All Time: 2013
- World Soccer 8th Greatest Manager of All Time: 2013
- France Football 26th Greatest Manager of All Time: 2019
- Sports Illustrated 10th Greatest Manager of All Time: 2019
- FourFourTwo 22th Greatest Manager of All Time: 2023

=== Managerial statistics ===
Team	From	To	Record				
Team	From	To	G	W	D	L	Win %
Liverpool	26 August 1974	1 July 1983	535	308	131	96	57.57

== See also ==
- List of European Cup and UEFA Champions League winning managers
- List of UEFA Cup and Europa League winning managers
- List of English football championship winning managers
