= Robert Johnston =

Robert, Rob, Robbie, Bob, or Bobby Johnston may refer to:

== Arts and entertainment ==
- Bob Johnston (1932–2015), American record producer
- Georgie Fab (Robert George Johnston, born 1952), Canadian rock musician, guitarist, singer songwriter and producer
- Bobby Johnston (born 1967), American composer and musician

== Business and industry ==
- Robert Johnston (1783–1839), British plantation owner in Jamaica
- Robert Johnston (businessman) (1924–1995), Australian industrialist and businessman
- Bob Johnston (economist) (1924–2023), Australian economist, governor of the Reserve Bank of Australia
- Rob Johnston, English assistant general secretary of International Transport Workers Federation

== Law and politics ==
- Robert Johnston (died 1687), English-born politician and judge in Ireland
- Robert Johnston (American politician) (1818–1885), American politician of the Confederate States
- Robert Johnston (Canadian politician) (1856–1913), Canadian politician and farmer in Ontario
- Robert Mercer Johnston (1916–1985), Canadian politician in Ontario
- Robert Smith Johnston, Lord Kincraig (1918–2004), Scottish judge

== Military ==
- Robert Johnston (naval officer) (1792–1882), Australian Navy officer
- Robert Daniel Johnston (1837–1919), brigadier general for the Confederate States of America during the American Civil War
- Robert B. Johnston (1937–2023), United States Marine Corps lieutenant general

== Sports ==
- Robert Johnston (cricketer) (1849–1897), Scottish-born New Zealand cricketer who played for Otago
- Robert Johnston (VC recipient) (1872–1950), Irish rugby union player and soldier
- Bert Johnston (footballer) (1909–1968), Scottish footballer (Sunderland AFC)
- Bob Johnston (footballer) (1929–2012), Australian footballer for Melbourne
- Robbie Johnston (born 1967), New Zealand long-distance runner

== Others ==
- Robert Mackenzie Johnston (1843–1918), Scottish-Australian statistician
- Robert Matteson Johnston (1867–1920), American historian
- Robert S. Johnston, American president of Saint Louis University

== See also ==
- Robert Johnson (disambiguation)
- Robert Johnstone (disambiguation)
- Bert Johnston (disambiguation)
