= Albert Johnson =

Albert Johnson may refer to:

== Politics ==
- Albert Johnson (Washington politician) (1869–1957), U.S. representative from Washington
- Albert Johnson (Mississippi politician), state legislator from Mississippi
- Albert Johnson (New Mexico politician) (died 1984), mayor of Las Cruces, New Mexico
- Albert W. Johnson (1906–1998), U.S. representative from Pennsylvania

== Sports ==
- Albert Johnson (hammer thrower) (1880–1963), American track and field athlete who competed in the 1904 Summer Olympics
- Albert Johnson (soccer) (1880–1941), Canadian football (soccer) player who competed in the 1904 Olympic Games
- Albert Johnson (jockey) (1900–1966), American Hall of Fame jockey
- Jack Johnson (real tennis) (Albert Ariel Bedwin Johnson, 1914–1996), English real tennis player
- Albert Johnson (rugby league, born 1918) (1918–1998), for Great Britain, England, and Warrington
- Albert Johnson (footballer, born 1920) (1920–2011), English professional footballer
- Albert Johnson (footballer, born 1923) (1923–1989), English professional footballer
- Albert Johnson (race walker) (1931–2011), British athlete at the 1956 and 1960 Summer Olympics
- Albert Johnson (gridiron football) (born 1977), American CFL and NFL football player
- Arthur Johnson (rugby league) (incorrectly cited "Albert Johnson"), English rugby league footballer of the 1900s, 1910s, and 1920s

== Other ==
- Albert Tilford Johnson (1851–1916), banker in Peoria, Illinois
- Albert Mussey Johnson (1872–1948), millionaire who befriended Death Valley Scotty and built Scotty's Castle
- Albert Williams Johnson (1872–1957), United States federal judge
- Albert Wesley Johnson (1923–2010), president of the Canadian Broadcasting Corporation
- Albert Johnson (criminal) (died 1932), Canadian criminal known as the "Mad Trapper of Rat River"
- Jigger Johnson (Albert Lewis Johnson, 1871–1935), American logging foreman, trapper, and fire warden for the U.S. Forest Service
- Prodigy (rapper), stage name of Albert Johnson (1974–2017), American rapper, one half of the duo Mobb Deep

== See also ==
- Al Johnson (disambiguation)
- Bert Johnson (disambiguation)
- Albert Johnston (disambiguation)
