= Hubert Johnston =

Hubert Johnston may refer to:

- Hubert Johnston (cricketer) (1865–1910), Scottish cricketer and solicitor
- Hubert Johnston, owner of Wickland (Shelbyville, Kentucky)
- Hubert Johnston, in 1952 NFL draft

== See also ==
- Bert Johnston (disambiguation)
- Hubert Johnson (disambiguation)
