= 1943–44 Liverpool F.C. season =

English football club season

Liverpool F.C.
1943–44 season
- Manager: George Kay
- Stadium: Anfield
- North Regional League: 3rd & 3rd
- League War Cup: 2nd Round
- Top goalscorer: League: Cyril Done; All: Cyril Done
Home colours	Away colours

The 1943–44 season saw Liverpool compete in the wartime North Regional League. Some matches were also part of the League War Cup and the Lancashire Senior Cup.

== Statistics ==
=== Appearances and goals ===
No.	Pos	Nat	Player	Total		Regional League North		Lancashire Cup Final	
No.	Pos	Nat	Player	Apps	Goals	Apps	Goals	Apps	Goals
	DF	(England) ENG	Jack Balmer	26	22	26	22	0	0
	FW	(Scotland) SCO	Bobby Beattie	25	12	24	12	1	0
	FW	(Scotland) SCO	Andy Black	2	1	2	1	0	0
	MF	(Scotland) SCO	Matt Busby	4	0	4	0	0	0
	MF	(England) ENG	Stan Butler	4	0	4	0	0	0
	DF	(England) ENG	Jackie Campbell	25	10	24	10	1	0
	FW	(England) ENG	Cyril Done	36	45	35	44	1	1
	FW	(Scotland) SCO	Jimmy Dougal	1	0	1	0	0	0
	FW	(Scotland) SCO	Willie Fagan	1	1	1	1	0	0
	DF	(Republic of Ireland) IRL	Bill Gorman	1	0	1	0	0	0
	DF	(Wales) WAL	Jeff Gulliver	37	1	36	1	1	0
	DF	(England) ENG	Ron Guttridge	2	0	2	0	0	0
	MF	(England) ENG	Billy Hall	7	1	7	1	0	0
	FW	(England) ENG	Alf Hanson	11	2	11	2	0	0
	DF	(Scotland) SCO	Jim Harley	3	2	3	2	0	0
	GK	(England) ENG	Alf Hobson	40	0	39	0	1	0
	DF	(England) ENG	Laurie Hughes	39	0	38	0	1	0
	MF	(England) ENG	Mick Hulligan	6	5	6	5	0	0
	MF	(Scotland) SCO	Robert Johnstone	1	0	0	0	1	0
	MF	(England) ENG	Bill Jones	2	0	2	0	0	0
			J.E. Jones	1	0	1	0	0	0
	DF	(England) ENG	Harry Kaye	19	0	19	0	0	0
	DF	(Wales) WAL	Ray Lambert	3	0	3	0	0	0
	MF	(Scotland) SCO	Billy Liddell	6	4	6	4	0	0
	MF	(England) ENG	James McCormick	2	1	2	1	0	0
			John McDonald	1	0	1	0	0	0
	MF	(South Africa) RSA	Berry Nieuwenhuys	10	6	9	6	1	0
	FW	(England) ENG	Stan Palk	17	4	17	4	0	0
	DF	(Scotland) SCO	George Paterson	1	0	1	0	0	0
	MF	(England) ENG	Jack Pilling	40	0	39	0	1	0
			Ken Seddon	4	0	4	0	0	0
	FW	(England) ENG	John Shafto	2	0	2	0	0	0
	MF	(England) ENG	Arthur Shepherd	7	10	7	10	0	0
	FW	(England) ENG	Phil Taylor	4	2	4	2	0	0
	MF	(England) ENG	Sammy Thorpe	2	0	2	0	0	0
	FW	(England) ENG	Don Welsh	18	16	17	14	1	2
	DF	(England) ENG	Jack Westby	29	0	28	0	1	0
	MF	(England) ENG	Arnold Whiteside	1	0	1	0	0	0

== Competitions ==
=== North Region War League, War League Cup and Lancashire Senior Cup ===
28 August 1943 1	Liverpool	4–1	Manchester City	Liverpool
	Balmer 6', 30', 39'; Done	Report	Percival 42'	Stadium: Anfield; Attendance: 16,000; Referee: H. Hartley

4 September 1943 2	Manchester City	2–1	Liverpool	Manchester
	Williamson; Boothway	Report	Hanson 40'	Stadium: Maine Road; Attendance: 10,229; Referee: H. Hartley

11 September 1943 3	Liverpool	8–0	Wrexham	Liverpool
	Balmer 6'; Hanson 21'; Shepherd	Report		Stadium: Anfield; Attendance: 10,000; Referee: J.H. Parker

18 September 1943 4	Wrexham	2–5	Liverpool	Wrexham
	Goal	Report	Balmer 28', 43' (? ) Shepherd 39', 64'	Stadium: Racecourse Ground; Attendance: 5,100

25 September 1943 5	Liverpool	3–1	Bury	Liverpool
	Done; Shepherd	Report	Goal	Stadium: Anfield; Attendance: 14,000; Referee: J.N. Brown

2 October 1943 6	Bury	1–2	Liverpool	Bury
	Black	Report	Shepherd 23'; Hulligan 48'	Stadium: Gigg Lane; Attendance: 14,000; Referee: J.N. Brown

9 October 1943 7	Everton	4–6	Liverpool	Liverpool
	Hughes 49' (o.g.); Lawton 54'; Stevenson 85'; McIntosh 87'	Report	Done 5', 8', 42', 66'; Harley 40'; Welsh 67'	Stadium: Goodison Park; Attendance: 28,835; Referee: P. Snape

16 October 1943 8	Liverpool	5–2	Everton	Liverpool
	Harley 3'; Done 23'; Balmer 41', 80'; Nieuwenhuys 49'	Report	Goal	Stadium: Anfield; Attendance: 25,000

23 October 1943 9	Liverpool	3–4	Manchester United	Liverpool
	Balmer; Welsh	Report	Pearson; McDonald; Smith	Stadium: Anfield; Attendance: 15,000; Referee: J.H. Parker

30 October 1943 10	Manchester United	1–0	Liverpool	Manchester
	McKay	Report		Stadium: Maine Road; Attendance: 13,647; Referee: J.H. Parker

6 November 1943 11	Chester	3–1	Liverpool	Chester
	Goal	Report	Welsh	Stadium: Sealand Road; Attendance: 2,500

13 November 1943 12	Liverpool	9–0	Chester	Liverpool
	Beattie; Done; Palk	Report		Stadium: Anfield; Attendance: 9,000; Referee: E.W. Baker

20 November 1943 13	Liverpool	9–0	Southport	Liverpool
	Beattie; Campbell; Done; Nieuwenhuys; Welsh	Report		Stadium: Anfield; Attendance: 13,600; Referee: G. Twist

27 November 1943 14	Southport	1–3	Liverpool	Southport
	Goal	Report	Welsh 30'; Done 34'; Balmer 87'	Stadium: Haig Avenue; Attendance: 4,000

4 December 1943 15	Burnley	0–1	Liverpool	Burnley
		Report	Palk	Stadium: Turf Moor; Attendance: 5,995

11 December 1943 16	Liverpool	1–1	Burnley	Liverpool
	Beattie	Report	Jackson 28'	Stadium: Anfield; Attendance: 11,360; Referee: E.W. Baker

18 December 1943 17	Tranmere Rovers	2–9	Liverpool	Birkenhead
	Danny Glidden 56'; Pat Jackson 73'	Report	Gulliver 15'; Beattie 27', 44', 45'; Done 30', 55', 70'; Balmer 87'; Welsh 89'	Stadium: Prenton Park; Attendance: 3,500; Referee: J. Brown

25 December 1943 18	Liverpool	2–1	Tranmere Rovers	Liverpool
	Done	Report	Glidden	Stadium: Anfield; Attendance: 17,204

27 December 1943 19	Liverpool	4–0	Wrexham	Liverpool
	Hulligan 5'; Balmer 11', 22'; Done 30'	Report		Stadium: Anfield; Attendance: 20,139

1 January 1944 20	Wrexham	4–2	Liverpool	Wrexham
	Goal	Report	Done 40', 85'	Stadium: Racecourse Ground; Attendance: 4,442
Note: Also counted as a Qualifying Round for the League War Cup competition.

8 January 1944 21	Tranmere Rovers	1–6	Liverpool	Birkenhead
	Goal	Report	Campbell 19', 34'; Welsh 74'; Palk 83'; Done 85', 88'	Stadium: Prenton Park; Attendance: 6,000
Note: Also counted as a Qualifying Round for the League War Cup competition.

15 January 1944 22	Liverpool	5–1	Tranmere Rovers	Liverpool
	Balmer; Beattie; Black; Campbell; Done	Report	Goal	Stadium: Anfield; Attendance: 13,537; Referee: W.D. Murdoch
Note: Also counted as a Qualifying Round for the League War Cup competition.

22 January 1944 23	Liverpool	1–4	Everton	Liverpool
	Fagan 44'	Report	Wyles 16'; Wainwright 30', 35'; Lawton 84'	Stadium: Anfield; Attendance: 34,221; Referee: W.B. Nixon
Note: Also counted as a Qualifying Round for the League War Cup competition.

29 January 1944 24	Everton	2–3	Liverpool	Liverpool
	Wyles 21'; Lawton 42'	Report	Nieuwenhuys 10'; Balmer 15'; Welsh (pen.)	Stadium: Goodison Park; Attendance: 45,820; Referee: W.B. Nixon
Note: Also counted as a Qualifying Round for the League War Cup competition.

5 February 1944 25	Crewe Alexandra	1–3	Liverpool	Crewe
	Goal	Report	Liddell; Campbell	Stadium: Gresty Road; Attendance: 3,000
Note: Also counted as a Qualifying Round for the League War Cup competition.

12 February 1944 26	Liverpool	8–0	Crewe Alexandra	Liverpool
	Balmer 25'; Done 30', 75', 88'; Campbell 33', 84'; Liddell 52'; Beattie 72'	Report		Stadium: Anfield; Attendance: 13,006; Referee: S. Boardman
Note: Also counted as a Qualifying Round for the League War Cup competition.

19 February 1944 27	Liverpool	4–2	Chester	Liverpool
	Done 30'; Nieuwenhuys 81'; Campbell 86'; Liddell 88'	Report	Goal	Stadium: Anfield; Attendance: 13,355; Referee: B. Yeomans
Note: Also counted as a Qualifying Round for the League War Cup competition.

26 February 1944 28	Chester	6–0	Liverpool	Chester
	Goal	Report		Stadium: Sealand Road; Attendance: 6,000
Note: Also counted as a Qualifying Round for the League War Cup competition.

4 March 1944 29	Liverpool	8–1	Oldham Athletic	Liverpool
	Balmer 5', 9', 28', 44'; Taylor 15', 49'; Done 51', 89'	Report	Goal	Stadium: Anfield; Attendance: 20,786
Note: Also counted as Round One 1st Leg for the League War Cup Competition.

11 March 1944 30	Oldham Athletic	1–0	Liverpool	Oldham
	Goal	Report		Stadium: Boundary Park; Attendance: 4,955
Note: Also counted as Round One 2nd Leg for the League War Cup Competition.

18 March 1944 31	Manchester City	1–1	Liverpool	Manchester
	Heale	Report	Welsh 67'	Stadium: Maine Road; Attendance: 27,792; Referee: J. Williams
Note: Also counted as Round Two 1st Leg for the League War Cup Competition.

25 March 1944 32	Liverpool	2–3 (a.e.t.)	Manchester City	Liverpool
	McCormick 44'; Done 80'	Report	Heale; Herd	Stadium: Anfield; Attendance: 41,498
Note: Also counted as Round Two 2nd Leg for the League War Cup Competition with the ninety minute score at 2-2 for the League and the match score at 3-2 in favour of Manchester City for the Cup.

1 April 1944 33	Liverpool	6–2	Southport	Liverpool
	Beattie; Done; Hall; Nieuwenhuys (pen.)	Report	Goal	Stadium: Anfield; Attendance: 8,533; Referee: W. Kitts
Note: Also counted as Round One 1st leg for the Lancashire Senior Cup.

8 April 1944 34	Southport	4–7	Liverpool	Southport
	Goal	Report	Hulligan; Welsh (pen.); Beattie; Campbell; Done	Stadium: Haig Avenue; Attendance: 4,000
Note: Also counted as Round One 2nd leg for the Lancashire Senior Cup.

10 April 1944 35	Everton	3–0	Liverpool	Liverpool
	Jones 7'; McIntosh 15'; Grant 28'	Report		Stadium: Goodison Park; Attendance: 40,000; Referee: G. Gibson
Note: Also counted as Round Two 1st Leg for the Lancashire Senior Cup

15 April 1944 36	Liverpool	3–0	Everton	Liverpool
	Hulligan 10', 86'; Done 25'	Report		Stadium: Anfield; Attendance: 25,062; Referee: F. White
Note: Also counted as Round Two 2nd Leg for the Lancashire Senior Cup with the match being played for 135 minutes.

22 April 1944 37	Liverpool	4–2	Everton	Liverpool
	Done 15' (pen.) 65' 88'; Palk 53'	Report	T.G. Jones 8'; Wyles 81'	Stadium: Anfield
Note: Also counted as a Round Two play off for the Lancashire Senior Cup

29 April 1944 38	Liverpool	1–0	Blackburn Rovers	Liverpool
	Welsh 36' (pen.)	Report		Stadium: Anfield; Attendance: 17,103; Referee: G. Gibson
Note: Also counted as a Semi-Final 1st leg for the Lancashire Senior Cup with only the one leg played.

6 May 1944 39	Liverpool	3–1	Bolton Wanderers	Liverpool
	Nieuwenhuys 36'; Hubbick 76' (o.g.); Campbell 80'	Report	Goal	Stadium: Anfield; Attendance: 16,591
Note: also counted for the Lancashire Senior Cup Final 1st Leg.

=== Lancashire Senior Cup Final ===
13 May 1944 2nd Leg	Bolton Wanderers	2–3	Liverpool	Bolton
	Goal	Report	Done 42'; Welsh	Stadium: Burnden Park; Attendance: 10,254
