= Isaac Nichols =

Australian convict (1770–1819)

- Born: 29 July 1770; Calne, Wiltshire, England
- Died: 8 November 1819 (aged 49); Sydney, Australia
- Other names: Isaac Nicholls
- Occupation: Postmaster
- Children: 3

Isaac Nichols (29 July 1770 – 18 November 1819) was an English-born Australian farmer, shipowner and public servant who was a convict transported to New South Wales on the Third Fleet, on the Admiral Barrington. He was transported for seven years in 1790 for stealing. He is most remembered as the first postmaster of the postal service now known as Australia Post.

== In New South Wales ==
Isaac was born in Calne, Wiltshire, to Jonathan Nichols and his wife Sarah. In New South Wales he won favour with Governor Hunter and his aide-de-camp George Johnston, and was appointed chief overseer of convict gangs labouring in the Sydney area. In 1797 after his sentence expired, Hunter granted him 50 acres (20 ha) in the Concord district, on which he established a farm, and was assigned two convicts to farm it in lieu of his salary as chief overseer. The next year he purchased a spirit licence and opened an inn in George St.

In 1799 he was convicted of receiving stolen goods and sentenced to 14 years on Norfolk Island, in a trial that Governor Hunter believed was based on perjury and prejudice. (Nichols had refused to assign more convicts than was correct to John Macarthur and other officers of the New South Wales Corps). Hunter suspended the sentence and referred the matter to England. Eventually, in 1802, Governor King was instructed to grant him a free pardon. In the meantime, Nichols had added greatly to his landholdings and built a house and substantial buildings in lower George St. He established a shipyard, and in 1805 built a ship 'the Governor Hunter' which he used for trade. He became a successful businessman.

Despite his earlier problems with the officers of the New South Wales Corps, he sided with them in the Rum Rebellion to depose Governor Bligh. (He had been an assigned convict to George Johnston, one of the leaders of the rebellion, and later married his stepdaughter.) In March 1809 he was appointed by the military junta led by Johnston superintendent of public works and assistant to the naval office, and then in April was appointed by the same junta the first postmaster in New South Wales. Nichols' main duty as postmaster was to take control of mail as it arrived on the wharves. The mayhem that could occur when supply ships arrived, which was said to include unscrupulous people taking other people's mail and selling it back to them, made a more secure and orderly system a necessity. Nichols used his house in lower George St, the Rocks, as the post office, going to newly arrived ships to pick up the mail and then posting a list of recipients outside his house.

When Governor Macquarie arrived in 1810 he also approved of Nichols, and appointed him principal superintendent of convicts. In his last ten years Nichols enjoyed the respect and friendship of most leading people in the colony. His home was the scene of many social functions, including the Bachelors' Ball and the annual dinners to celebrate the foundation of the colony. He was a major supplier of meat to government stores and a generous subscriber to public causes.

== Legacy ==
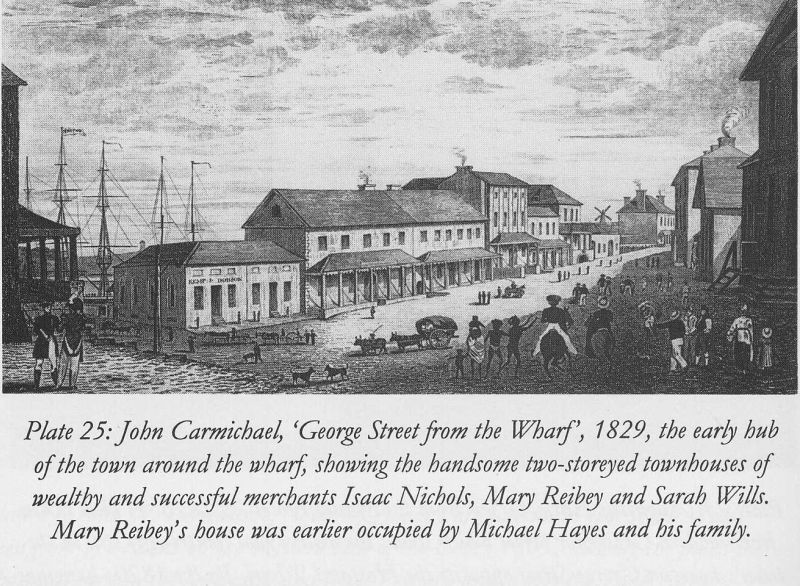
Nichols' house along George Street, 1829

On 11 September 1796 Nichols married Mary Warren, who died by drowning in October 1804. On 18 February 1805, at the age of 34, Nichols married 18-year-old Rosanna Abrahams (aka Rosetta Julian), daughter of Esther Abrahams (aka Esther Julian, de facto wife of George Johnston). They had three sons: Isaac David (1807–1867), "gentleman", George Robert (1809–1857), barrister and solicitor and politician in New South Wales, and Charles Hamilton (1811–1869). Shortly before Isaac Nichols died in 1819 he sent the two elder boys to England to be educated. Their education was cut short and they returned to the colony in 1822.

Isaac David, described as "gentleman", declared himself insolvent in 1836 to escape his creditors. He married one Sarah Hutchinson. George became a solicitor and barrister and politician in New South Wales in the 1840s and 50s. He was bankrupted in the financial crisis of 1842 but later returned to his legal practice and later still became a member of Parliament. From 1848, Charles was the proprietor of Bell's Life in Sydney and Sporting Reviewer. After Charles' death the Nichols family ceased to be publicly active.

Political offices
New office	Postmaster of New South Wales; 1809–1819	Succeeded by George Panton
