= Robert Johnstone =

Robert Johnstone may refer to:

- Robert Maxwell Johnstone (1914–1990), senior British Army officer
- Robert Arthur Johnstone (1843–1905), officer in the Native Police paramilitary force
- Robert James Johnstone (1872–1938), Northern Ireland physician and politician
- Robert William Johnstone (1879–1969), Scottish surgeon
- Bobby Johnstone (1929–2001), Scottish footballer (Hibernian, Manchester City, Oldham Athletic, national team)
- Bobby Johnstone (1960s footballer) (fl. 1958–1969), Scottish footballer (Stirling Albion, Airdrieonians, Dumbarton)
- Bobby Johnstone (footballer, born 1918) (1918–2007), Scottish footballer (Tranmere Rovers)
- Bob Johnstone (Australian footballer) (1942–2001), Australian footballer (Collingwood)
- Bob Johnstone (broadcaster) (c. 1930–2012), Canadian broadcaster
- Bob Johnstone (goalkeeper) (1911–?), Scottish footballer (Partick Thistle)
- Bob Johnstone (Scottish footballer) (fl. 1890s), Scottish footballer
- Bob Johnstone (singer) (1916–1994), American traditional pop music singer

== See also ==
- Robert Johnston (disambiguation)
