= Herbert Johnson =

Herbert Johnson may refer to:

- Herbert Fisk Johnson Sr. (1868–1928), second-generation business magnate (S.C. Johnson & Son)
- Herbert Johnson (cartoonist) (1878–1946), American cartoonist
- Herb Johnson (footballer) (1879–1942), Australian footballer for Collingwood
- Herbert Victor Johnson (1889–1962), Australian politician
- Herbert Fisk Johnson Jr. (1899–1978), third-generation business magnate (S.C. Johnson & Son)
- Herbert Fisk Johnson III (born 1958), fifth-generation business magnate (S.C. Johnson & Son)
- Herb Johnson (American football) (1928–2021), American football halfback
- Herb Johnson (basketball) (born 1962), professional basketball player
- Herbert Thomas Johnson (1872–1942), military officer in Vermont
- Herbert Johnson (hatters), London hatters

== See also ==
- Bert Johnson (disambiguation)
