= Robert Johnston (naval officer) =

Australian naval officer (1792–1882)

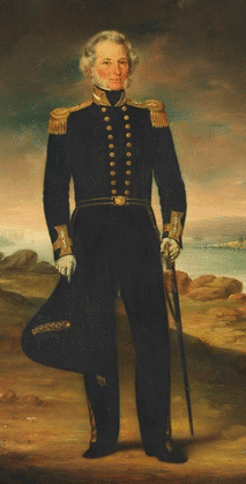
- Captain Robert Johnston R.N
- Born: Robert Johnston; 9 March 1792; Sydney, New South Wales, Australia
- Died: 8 September 1882 (aged 90); Annandale, New South Wales, Australia
- Occupations: Naval Officer, Grazier
- Years active: 1805–1870s
- Spouse: Frances Weller
- Children: 15 (8 Adopted)

Captain Robert Johnston, R.N. (born 9 March 1792 – 8 September 1882) was an early Australian Navy Officer. Born in Sydney, Johnston grew up in the early colonial days of New South Wales and entered the British Navy at a young age, and was the first Native-Born Australian to do so. He was present during many battles including Battle of Corunna and the Siege of Cádiz. He remained attached to the Navy late into his years until he was no longer required.

== Family ==
Johnston was the Son of respected Lieutenant-Colonel George Johnston who in 1808 led the New South Wales Corps to the only successful armed takeover of government in Australian history which is commonly known as the Rum Rebellion, and Esther Abrahams a Convict woman who became his de facto wife after they met on the First Fleet. Together they had 7 children but married later on.

== Early life and education ==
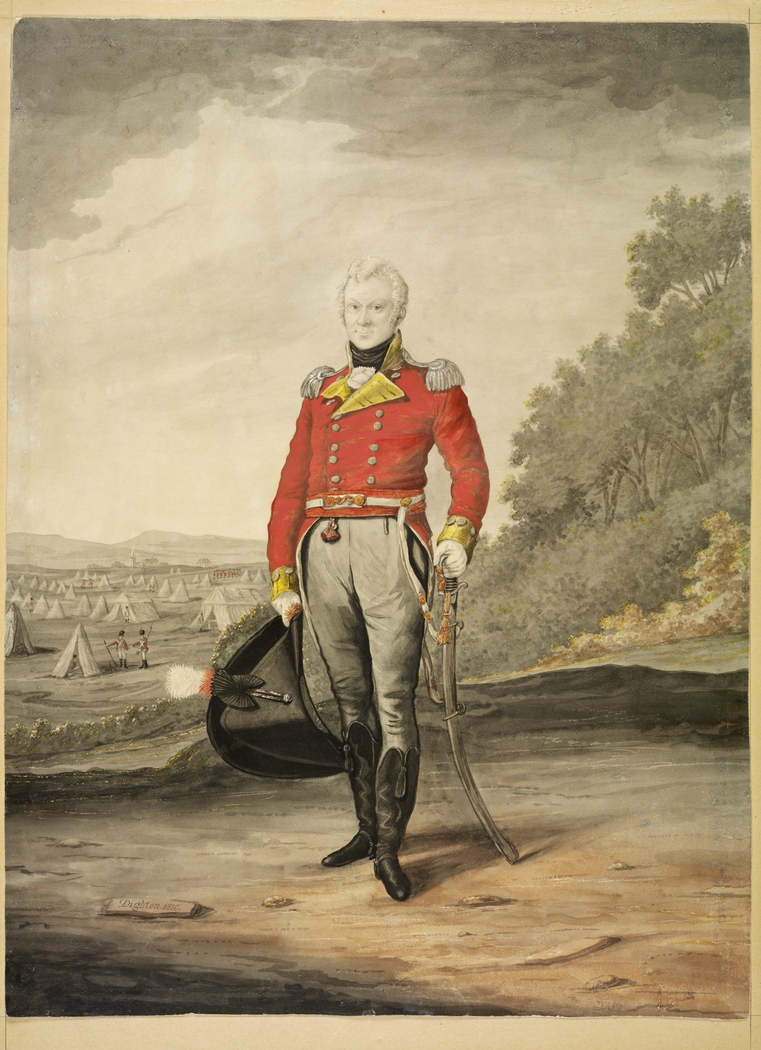
His father George

Robert Johnston was born in Sydney in the year 1792, One of the first white European Australians to be born in the fledgling colony. His Father was distinguished Lieutenant-Colonel George Johnston of the New South Wales Corps, or 102nd Regiment, who was the chief actor in the deposition of Governor Bligh. He inherited from his father the same spirit which distinguished that officer during his Official career in the colony. At seven years of age young Johnston accompanied his father to England, and was placed at school at Newington Butts, Surrey, where he remained until he was 13 years old.

== Naval service ==
Johnston entered the navy as a first class volunteer on HMS Malabar a 50-gun ship, the first native of Australia to do so. Though he was closely followed by other Native Born Australians John Mitchell and James Patrick Furzer. In this vessel he shared in the proceedings of the British North Sea fleet in their blockade of the Dutch and French fleets in the Texel, but without remaining any length of time in that employment Malabar was recalled home for the purpose of conveying troops from England to Monte Video, where a British force had failed in an attack upon the city. Returning to England after having performed this duty Malabar was paid off, and young Johnston joined the Namure, receiving ship, as midshipman, and shortly afterwards was appointed to Semiramis, a 36-ton frigate, commissioned for active service off the coasts of Spain and Portugal. In this position he remained from October 1808, to January 1810, and during that period he was present at the memorable Battle of Corunna.

Leaving Semiramis he went on board the 74-gun Norge as master's mate; and being again stationed off the coast of Portugal he was present at the Siege of Cádiz by the French under Marshal Soult, and took part in the attack on St. Mary's, where he was in command of a rocket boat, and narrowly escaped death through the boat being sunk by a round shot, and those who were not killed left struggling in the water until a rescue could be effected.

Johnston and another officer were subsequently placed with a crew of 150 men on board the captured French 80-gun ship Neptune — one of the vessels that escaped from Nelson's fleet after the Battle of Trafalgar — and ordered to proceed with her to Majorca, where she was to be laid up; and this service having been accomplished, he returned to Norge, which shortly afterwards sailed to England for the purpose of joining the Scheldt fleet under the command of Admiral Sir William Young. Later on, Johnston joined the 74-gun Asia, carrying the flag of Vice-Admiral Sir Alexander Cochrane, Commander-in-Chief on the American station. At this period Great Britain was at war with the United States, and the Asia sailed for Bermuda, where Johnston received his commission as lieutenant, and was appointed to the command of an advice vessel, or what at the present day would be called a despatch boat. In this little vessel he saw some fighting, and was present when a British fleet ascended Chesapeake Bay and captured the city of Washington.

Rejoining Sir Alexander Cochrane, on board Asia, at Port Royal, Jamaica, Lieutenant Johnston was directed to place himself under the orders of Sir Peter Parker, Bart., commanding the frigate Menelaus, then engaged in blockading the approaches to the city of Baltimore. This he did, and he was present with Sir Peter Parker in the night attack on Moorefields, where Sir Peter Parker was killed. The death of his commander caused Lieutenant Johnson to be sent with despatches announcing the event to Admiral Cochrane, and then returning to Menelaus. He remained on board that vessel until after the unsuccessful attack by the British forces on Baltimore, when he was directed to proceed to Jamaica, and again place himself under the orders of the Commander-in-Chief. This led to his being engaged in the service of landing troops for an attack on New Orleans, against which place and Mobile a large expedition was sent, and, after the repulse of the British, in bringing the wounded from the front. Peace was shortly afterwards proclaimed, and Lieutenant Johnston receiving promotion, was appointed second-lieutenant of his old ship, Asia, which was then under the command of Captain Alexander Skeene, and was employed cruising off the coast of West Florida.

On returning home the ship was paid off, and Lieutenant Johnston found himself ashore with no immediate prospect of further active employment. The idea then occurred to him that the opportunity was a good one for paying a visit to his family in Sydney, and obtaining leave of absence, he sailed for New South Wales, and arrived in Sydney in October 1816. Here he received a cordial welcome, and had not been in Sydney long before his services were secured by Governor Lachlan Macquarie for a voyage of discovery in the Government cutter Schnapper. While engaged in this duty, his party were the first settlers to discover a river—known to the Walbanga local people as Bhundoo—that he named the Clyde, and, on returning to Sydney, accompanied the Governor on a visit of inspection to Newcastle and Port Macquarie. During the time they were at the latter place Lieutenant Johnston was instrumental in saving the vessel Lady Nelson from being a total wreck. Subsequently he formed one of an exploring party under Sir John Jamieson, whose object it was to ascertain the source of the Warragamba River, and when his companions decided to return in consequence of the difficulty of travelling over the broken country of the mountains, Lieutenant Johnston pressed on, and himself accomplished the object of the expedition.

== Later life ==
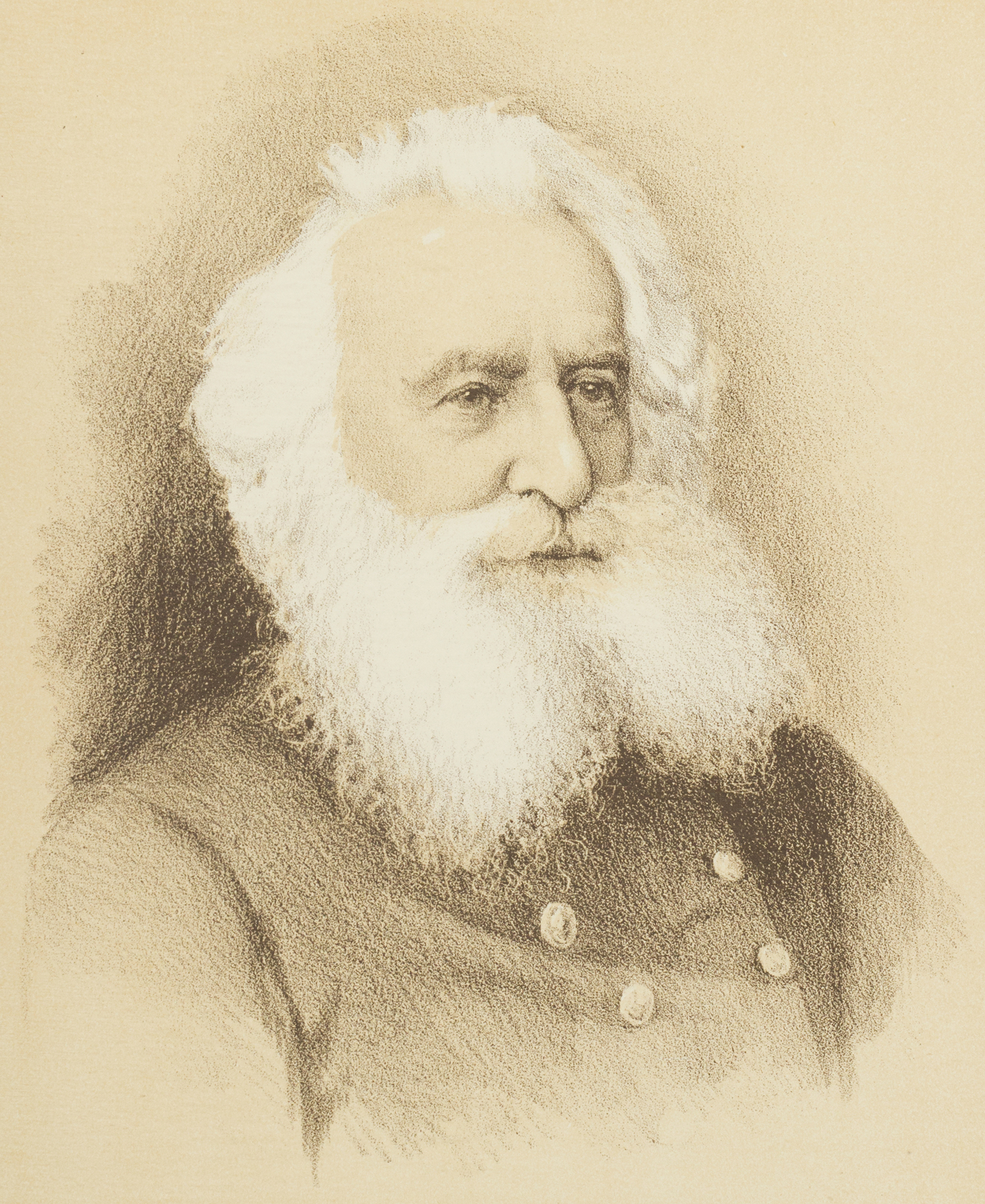
Portrait of Robert Johnston, Australia, c 1875, lithograph from Australian Men of Mark

He contemplated returning to England after the death of his eldest brother George Johnston who died falling from a horse and this being followed not long afterwards by the death of his father, Lieutenant George Johnston.

He was induced to abandon his intention of returning to England to resume his duties as an officer in the navy, a decision he arrived at with the greatest reluctance. The affairs of his family, however, required attention, and remaining in Sydney he entered into pastoral and agricultural pursuits in conjunction with his brother David. In this occupation he became very successful, for his active and vigorous nature was such as to make success a certainty in almost anything he took in hand, and he has left behind him large and valuable station and other properties.

In the year 1831 he married the eldest daughter of the late Mr. Joseph Weller, of Hammershaw County, Bucks, England, and had a family of seven sons and two daughters. The elder daughter is the wife of Mr. Samuel Dickinson, a member of the firm of Learmonth, Dickinson, and Co., and the second married Mr. S. A. Murray, of P. N. Russell and Co. In Lieutenant Johnston was promoted to the rank of Commander in the Royal Navy.

Up until his later years, Johnston remained very active. He continued to work and later on embarked on a journey to New Zealand, and a rough yachting cruise along the coast of New South Wales. At the age of 92 he was making arrangements to pay a visit to England.

== Death and legacy ==
Robert Johnston died of old age with a funeral taking place at Annandale on a Sunday afternoon, which was attended by about 150 friends and family, and viewed by a large gathering of people from the surrounding neighbourhood, who watched the proceedings with respectful interest. He was buried at the grounds attached to the State residence of the deceased, and not far from the Camperdown and Petersham road (Parramatta Road). Under the command of a lieutenant from HMS Nelson a party of blue jackets, formed a firing party to pay the last tribute of respect accorded at naval and military funerals, with a portion of the men being told off to carry the coffin to the grave.
