= International cricket in 1902 =

International cricket season

The 1902 international cricket season was from April 1902 to September 1902.

== Season overview ==
International tours
Start date	Home team	Away team	Results [Matches]			
Start date	Home team	Away team	Test	ODI	FC	LA
22 May 1902	Marylebone	Ireland	—	—	0–0 [1]	—
29 May 1902	England	Australia	1–2 [5]	—	—	—
30 June 1902	Scotland	Australia	—	—	0–1 [1]	—
13 August 1902	Netherlands	Marylebone	—	—	0–3 [3]	—

== May ==
=== Ireland in England ===
Three-day Match
No.	Date	Home captain	Away captain	Venue	Result
Match	22–24 May	W. G. Grace	Tim O'Brien	Lord's, London	Match drawn

== June ==
=== Australia in England ===
The Ashes Test series
No.	Date	Home captain	Away captain	Venue	Result
Test 70	29–31 May	Archie MacLaren	Joe Darling	Edgbaston Cricket Ground, Birmingham	Match drawn
Test 71	12–14 June	Archie MacLaren	Joe Darling	Lord's, London	Match drawn
Test 72	3–5 July	Archie MacLaren	Joe Darling	Bramall Lane, Sheffield	Australia by 143 runs
Test 73	24–26 July	Archie MacLaren	Joe Darling	Old Trafford Cricket Ground, Manchester	Australia by 3 runs
Test 74	11–13 August	Archie MacLaren	Joe Darling	Kennington Oval, London	England by 1 wicket

=== Australia in Scotland ===
Three-day Match
No.	Date	Home captain	Away captain	Venue	Result
Match	30 Jun–1 July	Robert Johnston	Joe Darling	Grange Cricket Club Ground, Edinburgh	Australia by an innings and 105 runs

== August ==
=== MCC in Netherlands ===
Two-day Match Series
No.	Date	Home captain	Away captain	Venue	Result
Match 1	13–14 August	Not mentioned	Not mentioned	The Hague	Marylebone by 186 runs
Match 2	18–19 August	Not mentioned	Not mentioned	Haarlem	Marylebone by 4 wickets
Match 3	21–22 August	Not mentioned	Not mentioned	Haarlem	Marylebone by 5 wickets
