= Albert Sidney Johnston (disambiguation) =

Albert Sidney Johnston (1803–1862) was a military commander who served in the armies of the Republic of Texas, the United States of America, and the Confederate States of America.

Albert Sidney Johnston may also refer to:

- Albert Sidney Johnston High School, a defunct public high school in Austin, Texas
- Statue of Albert Sidney Johnston (Texas State Cemetery), a 1903 memorial sculpture by Elisabet Ney
- Statue of Albert Sidney Johnston (University of Texas at Austin), a statue by Pompeo Coppini

== See also ==
- Albert Johnston (disambiguation)
