= Bert Johnston (disambiguation) =

Bert Johnston (Charles Herbert Johnston Jr, born 1948) was a United States Navy officer.

Bert Johnston may also refer to:

- Bertie Johnston (1880–1942), Australian politician
- Bert Johnston (footballer) (1909–1968), Scottish footballer
- Herbert Johnston (1902–1967), British runner

== See also ==
- Albert Johnston (disambiguation)
- Hubert Johnston (disambiguation)
- Robert Johnston (disambiguation)
- Bert Johnson (disambiguation)
