= Annandale Farm =

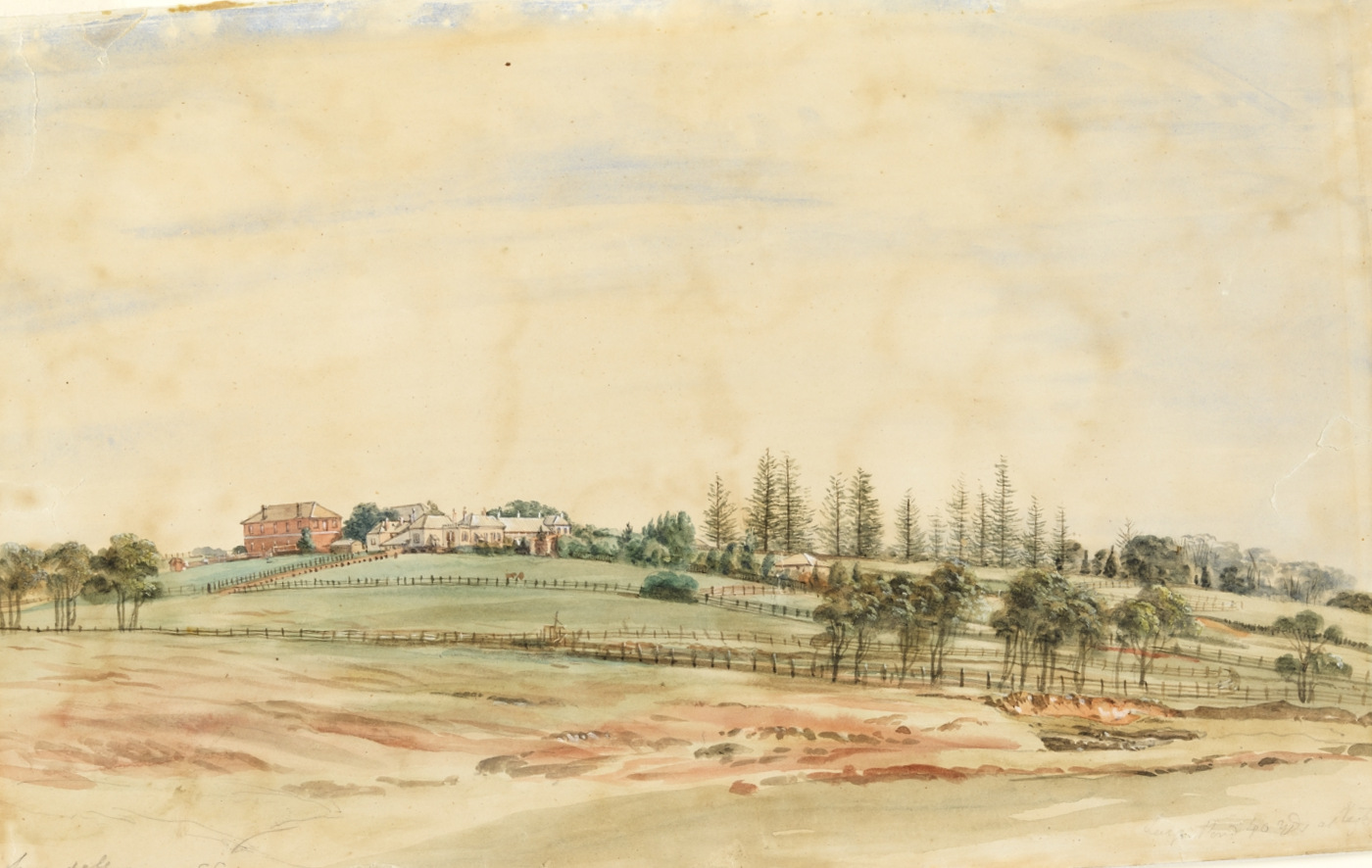
- Annandale Farm, near Parramatta Road, Australia

- Coordinates: 33°53.402′S 151°10.031′E
- Country: Australia
- State: New South Wales
- Established: 1793

Annandale Farm was situated six kilometres (3.7 miles) from Sydney in the present day suburbs of Stanmore and Annandale. Built by George Johnston, it became one of the most successful farms in the early colonial days of New South Wales. Johnston was a Royal Marines officer, and briefly Lieutenant-Governor of New South Wales. He was a key figure in the Rum Rebellion of 1808. He rode from the farm to arrest Captain Bligh on 26 January 1808. Also it was from the farm where Johnston marched with his troops to Castle Hill on 5 March 1804 to quell a convict revolt.

== History ==
Originally inhabited by the indigenous Eora people. The land was covered in eucalyptus forest. Johnston received grants of land. In May 1793 Johnston received an initial grant of 100 acres (40 hectares), then in 1801 Johnston had a further 602 acres (244 hectares) at Annandale. The original grant was centered around the farmhouse south of Parramatta Road. The farm later expanded north to the foreshores of Sydney Harbour. A key site in Australian colonial history, Annandale Farm served as Johnston's family home and centre of his business interests. It is likely that it was an active centre of colonial politics. The Johnston family were pivotal in the birth and growth of the Australian pastoral industry. Adjoining this land was a property in Camperdown owned by William Bligh, who Johnston overthrew in the Rum Rebellion.

== Farm ==
The farm was named after Johnston's birthplace in Scotland, Annan. The farm was successful as a meat provider for the colony of New South Wales. Soils were suited for agriculture, being based on Ashfield Shale. Rainfall is unreliable and erratic, but averages 1210 mm (47 inches) per year at nearby Sydney.

=== Buildings and produce ===
Cattle, horses, pigs and sheep are known to be grown at Annandale Farm. By 1801 Johnston had 602 acres (244 ha) at Annandale and Bankstown, with 160 acres (65 ha) sown in wheat and maize, grazing 7 horses, 27 horned cattle, 136 sheep, 85 goats and 29 hogs. Eventually, the farm had a bakery, smithy, slaughterhouse, butchery, stores, vineyard and orangerie. The orange trees are said to have been of great size, and to have yielded excellent fruit. Johnston's son Robert ran his extensive squatting interests from the property, using its large store buildings to house the grain and wool before its export to England. Annandale Farm is known to have fields of barley, wheat, and oats.

The farmhouse was built in 1799 on a ridge, south of Parramatta road. Constructed from bricks baked on site, as well as local red cedar. Situated between the present Macaulay and Albany roads, Stanmore. There was a dam at the back of the property. The farmhouse resembled Elizabeth Farm at Parramatta.

Near the farmhouse were other large buildings for storage and stabling. Plain, square shaped, red bricked two storied buildings housed a number of soldiers. The out-buildings were more conspicuous than the house and could be seen from the railway line from the south at Stanmore. Under the eaves of one of these out buildings was a deep toned bell, which used to toll at 6 am and other hours of the day, up until the 1870s.

=== Duke of Northumberland ===
Johnston's patron, the Duke of Northumberland sent him many gifts. Such as thoroughbred horses and cattle, as well as agricultural implements, and seeds. In later life Johnston devoted much of his time to the breeding of stock. The Duke also sent purebred merino sheep. Johnston was a friend and ally of John Macarthur, who is regarded as the father of the Australian merino sheep industry. But Johnston's merinos and some belonging to Thomas Rowley preceded the arrival of Macarthur's own stock by about four years, making Stanmore home to the first merino sheep in Australia. Northumberland Avenue is named after the Duke.

=== Esther Abrahams ===
Johnston' wife, Esther Abrahams managed the farm in George's frequent absences. She was Jewish and installed a kosher kitchen at Annandale House. Esther also regularly took cows from the farm to Horsley Park for slaughtering.

== Norfolk Island pines ==
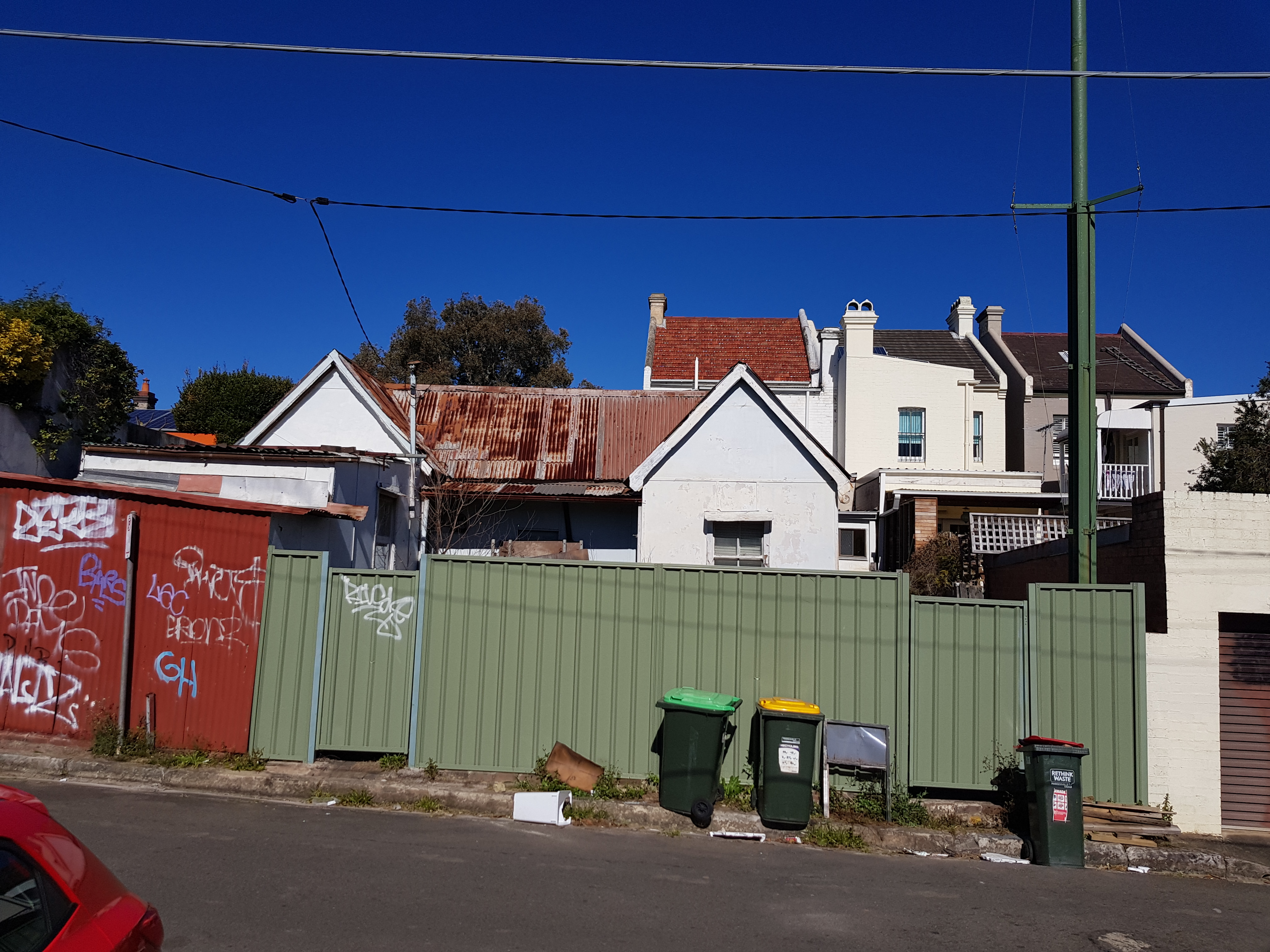
The gatehouse, last surviving building of Annandale Farm, view from rear lane

The first Norfolk Island pines on the mainland of Australia were planted at Annandale Farm. The trees lined the carriageway to the house, and could be seen by travelers on nearby Parramatta Road. They were grown from seedlings Johnston obtained when he was stationed on Norfolk Island. According to a historic photo, they grew to a height of 130 to 160 feet tall. The trees were cut down in 1903.

== Fate and relics ==
The farm was eventually divided and sold off as the city of Sydney expanded. The farmhouse was demolished in 1905. The gatehouse to Annandale Farm was relocated but is still standing, not far from Parramatta Road.

The gates to the farmhouse are situated at Annandale Public School. The area of the former farm is now housing, mostly detached late Victorian and Federation houses. There are few remaining open areas, such as Weekley Park.

Johnston died in 1823, and was interred in the family vault, designed by Francis Greenway. The vault was located at the intersection of Corunna and Northumberland Street, Stanmore. The remains of George Johnston and other members of the family were removed to Waverley Cemetery in 1888.
