= George Walter (businessman) =

English entrepreneur (1790 -1854)

George Walters (1790–1854) was an English entrepreneur, known for his involvement with early railways of the 1830s.

== Early life ==
He was the second son of the Rev. Edward Newton Walters. He became a Royal Marines 2nd lieutenant in 1811. Towards the end of the Napoleonic Wars he was serving on HMS Chatham. Well-connected, he was a member of the London Stock Exchange from 1823 to 1828. In 1825 he was involved in the unrealised project of Nicholas Wilcocks Cundy of a Portsmouth-London ship canal. He founded in 1829 the General Annuity Endowment Association, later the Sovereign Life Assurance Company.

== Railway entrepreneur ==
Walters was one of the founders of the Southampton and London Railway and Dock Company, in 1831, with Abel Rous Dottin, and Robert Johnston (1783–1839) from Jamaica. The company failed. George Thomas Landmann in October 1831 brought Walter into planning for the London and Greenwich Railway, and an initial meeting was held in Dottin's house in Argyle Street, London. The company's base was Walter's insurance office.

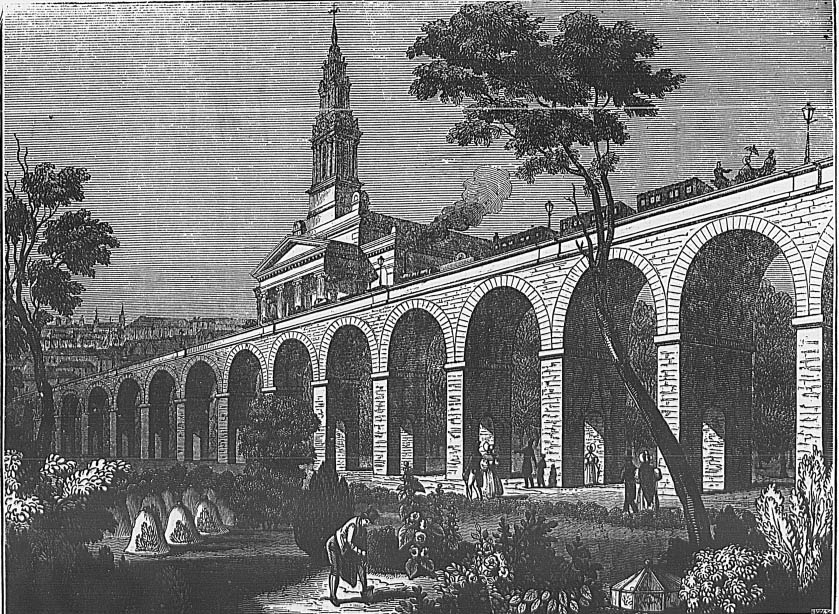
London Bridge – Greenwich Railway Viaduct, Bermondsey in 1836

In 1831, Walters took the position of secretary of the London & Greenwich; in 1835, he became Resident Director (i.e. managing director). At that time, the London Bridge – Greenwich Railway Viaduct was close to completion, and the prospect existed that the London & Greenwich would be the first railway running into the metropolis. The capital position of the company was not healthy, however, and the raising of additional finance depressed the share price. In July 1837, Dottin and Walter resigned as directors.

In 1835 Walters founded and subsidised the Railway Magazine, having seen the potential in the Mechanics' Magazine and its railway promotion; he brought in John Yonge Akerman as its editor. It was the first specialist railway periodical, and Walter used it to publicise the London & Greenwich, where Akerman was his replacement as secretary, and his other interests. In 1836 he sold it to John Herapath.

== Later life ==
In 1844 Walters became manager of the company manufacturing Kamptulicon; which was wound up in 1851. In the same year his partnership with Ebenezer Gough, to manufacture Kamptulicon, also ended.

Walter died at Prittlewell, Essex on 24 August 1854.

== Family ==
Walters married twice, and had 12 children. They included Dottin Alleyne Walter (1834 -1891), an architect known also as an antiquarian.
