= Bert Johnson =

Bert Johnson may refer to:

- Bert Johnson (baseball) (1905–1976), American Negro leagues baseball player
- Bert Johnson (American football) (1912–1993), American football running back
- Bert Johnson (footballer, born 1916) (1916–2009), British footballer and coach
- Bert Johnson (Australian footballer) (1939–2026), footballer for North Melbourne Football Club
- Bert Johnson (Canadian politician) (born 1939), Progressive Conservative member of the Legislative Assembly of Ontario
- Bert Johnson (Michigan politician) (born 1973), former Democratic member of the Michigan Senate
- Bertie Williams, later known as Kevin "Bert" Johnson, co-founder of the Aboriginal Tent Embassy in Canberra, Australia, in 1972

== See also ==
- Albert Johnson (disambiguation)
- Hubert Johnson (disambiguation)
- Herbert Johnson (disambiguation)
- Robert Johnson (disambiguation)
- Bert Johnston (disambiguation)
