= Esther Abrahams =

Convict transported to Australia

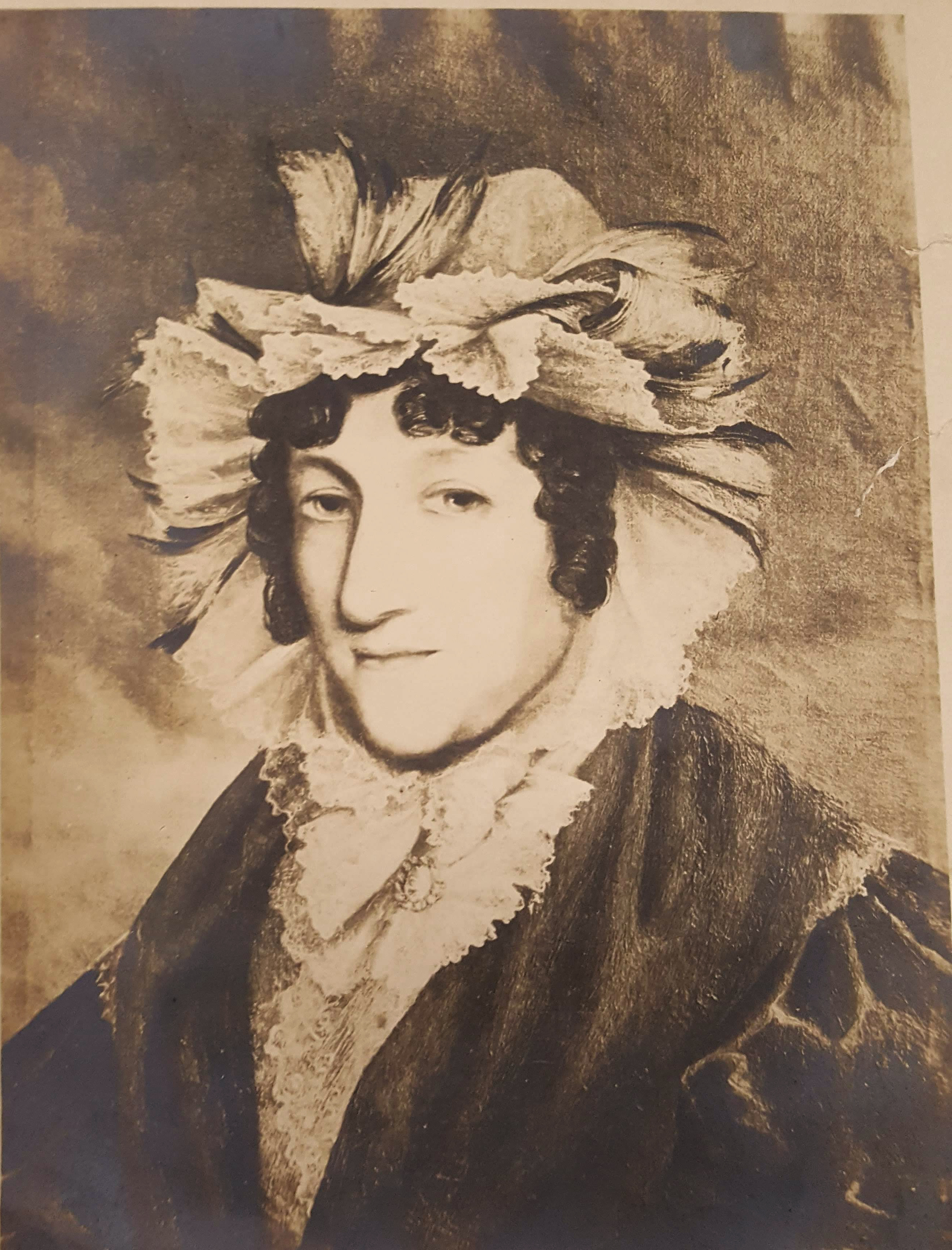
- Esther Johnstone (née Abrahams) [attributed]
- Born: Esther Abrahams c. 1767 or 1771; London, England
- Died: 26 August 1846; Sydney, Australia
- Other names: Esther Julian; Esther Johnston
- Spouses: George Johnston de facto: (m. 1788); de jure: (m. 1814; died 1823)
- Children: Rosanna Juliano (1787); George Johnston (1790); David Johnston (1798); Robert Johnston (1792); Blanche Johnston (1806)

Esther Abrahams (born c. 1767 or 1771 – died 26 August 1846) was a Londoner sent to Australia as a convict on the First Fleet. She was de facto wife of George Johnston, who was for six months acting Governor of New South Wales after leading the Rum Rebellion. They later married legally, in 1814.

== Early life and transportation ==
Abrahams was born in 1767 or 1771 to a Jewish family. At about the age of 20 (some sources give her age as 15 or 16) and while pregnant, she was tried at the Old Bailey, in London, on 30 August 1786, accused of stealing lace with a value of 50 shillings.

She was found guilty of theft, although the evidence was circumstantial and was sentenced to seven years transportation. At the time of the trial her occupation was listed as "milliner". She was imprisoned in Newgate Gaol, London, where she bore an illegitimate child named Rosanna (whose name is sometimes given in sources as Roseanna), father unknown, on 18 March 1787.

Within two months, Abrahams was transported to Australia with her baby daughter on the First Fleet, departing London in May 1787 on the convict transport Prince of Wales but transferring to Lady Penrhyn mid-voyage. They reached Sydney with the Fleet in January 1788.

== Life in New South Wales ==
On board the ship, traveling to Australia, she met George Johnston, a first lieutenant in the New South Wales Marine Corps, which had accompanied the First Fleet. He offered protection to her and her child. After the landing at Sydney Cove, she became his de facto wife.

On 4 March 1790 her first son, George Johnston junior, was baptised. Her sentence expired in 1793. Esther bore Johnston seven children, including three sons, George, David and Robert.' From 1800 she called herself "Julian" instead of Abrahams, after a renowned Judeo-Spanish family, originally Juliano and presumably the name of Rosanna's father. Her daughter Rosanna assumed the name Rosetta Julian.

In 1805, Robert enlisted in the Royal Navy, the first Australian-born person to do so. Rosanna (now named Rosetta Julian) in 1805, aged 18 years, married emancipated convict Isaac Nichols, who was a modest businessman in the colony and who was appointed in 1809, by the military junta, as the first postmaster in New South Wales.

Because of his rank, Johnston received huge land grants. He and Esther farmed and lived on Annandale with their children. Johnston's house, called Annandale House, was built in 1799 and was probably a wattle and daub cottage built by convicts. Esther's and Johnston's eldest son, George, had received his first land grant of 500 acres (200 ha) at Bankstown on 23 April 1804 from Governor Philip Gidley King.

On 26 January 1808, Johnston, now a major, led the Rum Rebellion, which overthrew Governor Bligh and acted as Lieutenant-Governor of the colony. In 1809 the military junta made land grants of 570 acres (230 ha) near Bankstown to Esther in her own right, as well as a conditional grant to George of 2,000 acres (810 ha) on the Nepean.

In March 1809 Johnston went to England to defend himself against charges of mutiny. When law and order was reinstated, appointments and land grants made by the junta were annulled. Governor Lachlan Macquarie rejected the grant to George as "inadmissible". Johnston returned to Sydney in 1813 and despite having led the rebellion was allowed to keep his land. The grant to Esther was confirmed in 1813, and George received the 100 acres (40 ha) "Foveaux's Gift" in December 1813, to which was added 600 acres (240 ha) at Cabramatta on 10 June 1815 and 650 acres (260 ha) at Bankstown on 31 August 1819.

While Johnston was in England for four years, Esther was left in charge of the estates.

A year after his return to Sydney, on 12 November 1814, Johnston and Esther, married at St John's Church in Parramatta, with Rosanna and her husband, Isaac Nichols, acting as witnesses at the wedding. Isaac Nichols died on 9 November 1829. Their oldest son, George, who had considerable landholdings in his own right, died from a riding accident on 19 February 1820, unmarried, childless and intestate. Johnston died on 5 January 1823 and bequeathed to his wife "Esther Johnston or Julian" the estate of Annandale for her natural life.

Shortly thereafter, disputes arose over the inheritance of the properties. Her son David had been left property of his own. However, Robert, who was to inherit Annandale on Esther's death, commenced court proceedings in March 1829 against her, to have her declared insane and incapable of running the Annandale properly. Esther put up a strong legal battle, producing many witnesses to prove she was of sound mind. Her refutation of the insanity claim was upheld; but trustees were nonetheless appointed to manage her affairs. Following the case, Esther went to live with David.

== Legacy ==
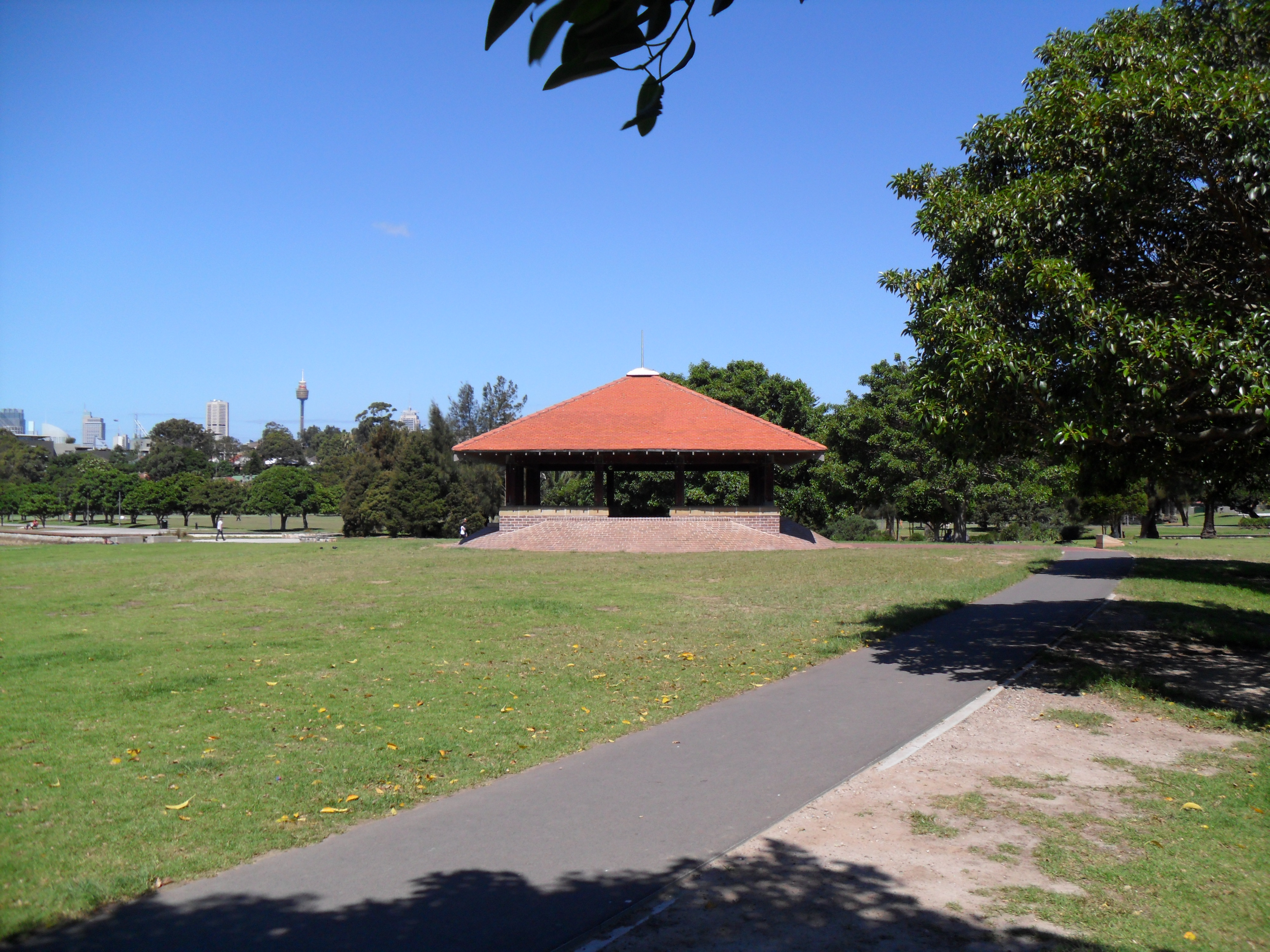
Esther Abrahams Pavilion, Bicentennial Park beside Rozelle Bay, Annandale

Esther died in 1846, and was buried beside her husband in the family vault on the Annandale property. Her remains and those of George Johnston and 47 of their descendants were moved to a new mausoleum at Waverley Cemetery in 1904. She was described by her grandson as "always a stirring industrious woman". Among their descendants was Rear Admiral Sir David Martin (1933–1990), a senior officer of the Royal Australian Navy and later Governor of New South Wales. Another of her descendants, through Rosanna, was Bob Nichols (1809–1857), barrister and solicitor and politician in New South Wales in the 1840s–50s.

While her husband is remembered in various geographic names, there was, until 2002, no such feature in Sydney named in Esther's memory. In 2002 a pavilion was dedicated in Bicentennial Park, in Johnston Street, Annandale, New South Wales, near the Anzac Bridge. Her portrait hangs in the Sydney Jewish Museum.
