= Hubert Johnson =

Hubert Johnson may refer to:

- Hubert Johnson (musician) (1941–1981), performer with The Contours
- Laurie Johnson (cricketer) (born 1927), West Indies born cricketer

== See also ==
- Bert Johnson (disambiguation)
- Hubert Johnston (disambiguation)
