= Wickland (Shelbyville, Kentucky) =

Historic house in Kentucky, United States

- U.S. National Register of Historic Places
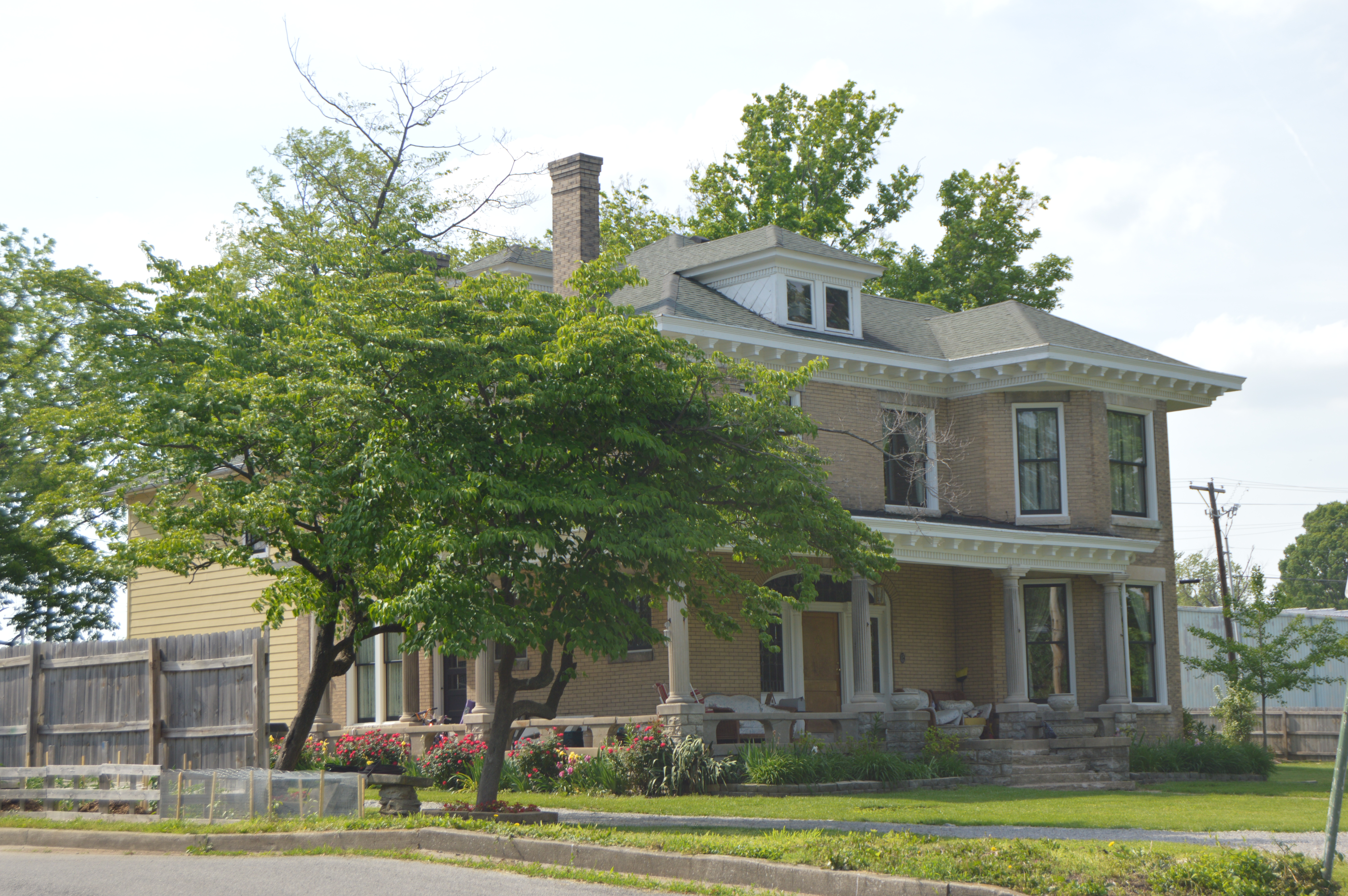
- Front and southern side

- Location within Kentucky Location within the United States
- Location: 169 Kentucky St., Shelbyville, Kentucky
- Coordinates: 38°12′37″N 85°21′4″W
- Area: 0.5 acres (0.20 ha)
- Built: 1901
- Architectural style: Neoclassical
- MPS: Shelbyville MRA
- NRHP reference No.: 84002023
- Added to NRHP: September 28, 1984

Wickland is a historic house in Shelbyville, Kentucky, United States, across from Prospect Avenue on Kentucky Street. It is named for the Wickland mansion in Bardstown, Kentucky, and is part of the Shelbyville Multiple Resource Area.

Wickland was built in 1901 by Charles Cotesworth Marshall, who was a circuit judge and Shelby County attorney. His wife Elizabeth Wickliffe Marshall's ancestral home was the Bardstown Wickland; Elizabeth was the daughter of the former governor of Louisiana, Robert C. Wickliffe. Marshall was born in Mississippi on May 26, 1868, to former Confederate soldier Charles C. Marshall and Mattie (Hill) Marshall, but was reared in Shelbyville by his aunt due to his parents dying when he was one year old, and was taught at various schools, both public and private, around Shelbyville. His aunt was the wife of the Shelby County judge. Other owners of the property were Arthur Johnston, Hubert Johnston, B.A. Thomas, G. William Johnston, and Kenneth Harris.

Wickland is considered a superb example of Classical Revival architecture. It is a two-story brick structure, with a pyramidal roof, right-side semi-octagonal projecting bay, and a central passage plan. The total property is less than a half-acre.

Wickland was one of several buildings studied since 1979 for the Shelbyville Multiple Resource Area. The Kentucky Heritage Council funded the effort of the Shelby County Historical Society to add many Shelbyville structures to the National Register, including Wickland. The original Wickland was placed on the Register a decade beforehand.
