= George Johnston (Royal Marines officer) =

Royal Marines officer and colonial administrator (1764–1823)

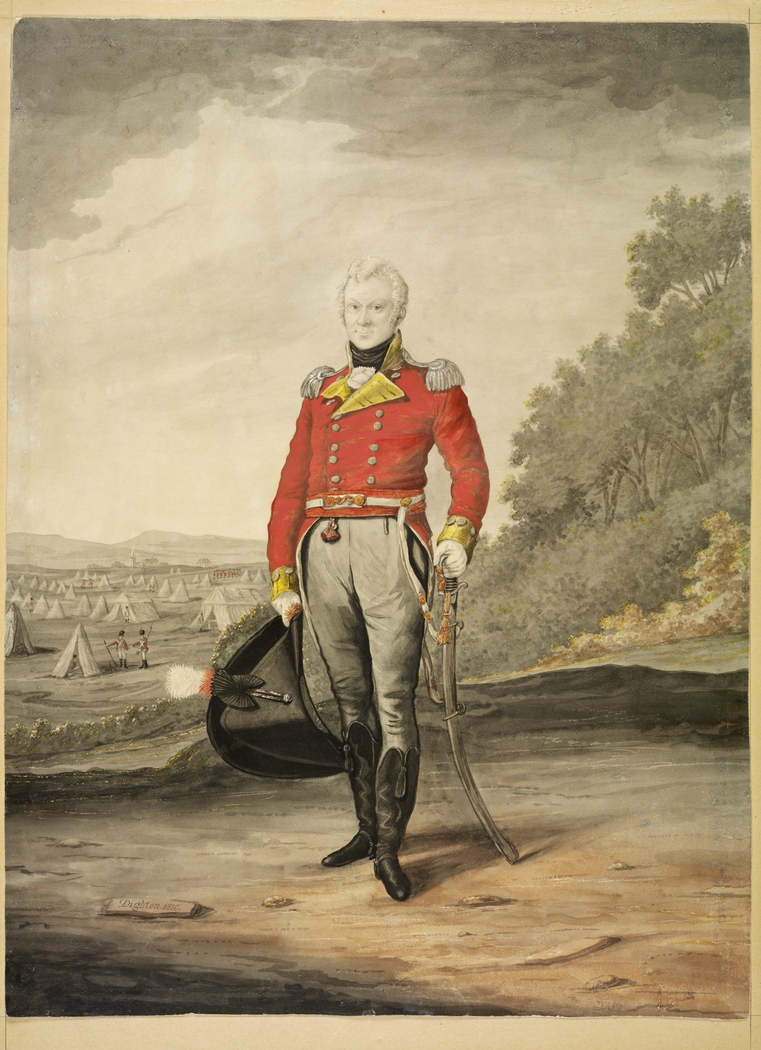
- Portrait by Robert Dighton, 1810
- Born: 19 March 1764; Annan, Dumfriesshire
- Died: 5 January 1823 (aged 58); Sydney, Colony of New South Wales
- Spouse: Esther Abrahams (m. 1814)
- Children: 7, including Robert
- Military career
- Allegiance: Great Britain; United Kingdom
- Branch: Royal Marines
- Service years: 1776–1811
- Rank: Lieutenant colonel
- Unit: New South Wales Corps
- Conflicts: American War of Independence; New York and New Jersey campaign; War of the First Coalition; East Indies theatre of the French Revolutionary Wars; Castle Hill convict rebellion; Rum Rebellion

Lieutenant-Colonel George Johnston (19 March 1764 – 5 January 1823) was a Royal Marines officer and colonial administrator who served as the Lieutenant-Governor of New South Wales from 1794 to 1795 and again from 1806 to 1808. After serving in the American War of Independence, he served in the East Indies theatre of the French Revolutionary Wars before volunteering to accompany the First Fleet which established the colony of New South Wales in 1788.

In New South Wales, Johnston served as an adjutant to Governor Arthur Phillip before joining the New South Wales Corps in September 1792, and played a key role in suppressing the Castle Hill convict rebellion in 1804. He led his troops in deposing Governor William Bligh in the Rum Rebellion in 1808, which led to Johnston to being court-martialled and cashiered from the military. In his later life, he returned to New South Wales as a private citizen, raising a family in the colony and establishing a successful farm around Annandale in Sydney.

== Early life and military career ==
Johnston was born on 19 March 1764 at Annan, Dumfriesshire, Scotland, the son of Marine Lieut David Johnston, who during the American Revolution, was Marine Captain-Lieut and aide-de-camp to Lord Percy, later the 2nd Duke of Northumberland. It may have been Percy who obtained a commission for the 12-year-old Johnston as second lieutenant of marines on 6 March 1776. Johnston went to America with the 2nd Marine Btn, and took part in the American War of Independence, serving in New York and Halifax during 1777 and 1778, after which he was promoted on 27 April 1778 to first lieutenant in the 91st Plymouth Marines. During the campaign, his father was wounded but survived and went on to serve in the Marines with his final record as Major appearing in March 1784. The Duke of Northumberland, who had held Johnston's father in high regard, became Johnston's sponsor.

The young officer subsequently acted as a recruiting officer in 1779 and 1780 in the United Kingdom before serving aboard HMS Sultan in the East Indies in 1781, and suffering a severe wound in action against the French. Returned to garrison duty in Portsmouth, he volunteered to join the New South Wales Marine Corps, which would accompany the First Fleet to New South Wales. He sailed for Australia aboard the convict transport Lady Penrhyn in 1787.

== New South Wales ==
On arrival in New South Wales, Johnston served as adjutant to Governor Arthur Phillip, and was promoted in 1789 to the rank of Captain-Lieutenant of Marines. He transferred from the New South Wales Marine Corps to the locally raised New South Wales Corps in September 1792 with the rank of captain.

Johnston received extensive land grants in areas of modern Petersham, Bankstown and Cabramatta. Johnston's other grants included land which is now the suburb of Annandale, named for his property that was in turn named after the place of his birth. He and Esther Abrahams farmed and lived on Annandale with their children.

On 26 January 1808, Johnston played a key role in the only successful armed takeover of a government in Australia's recorded history, the Rum Rebellion, working closely with John Macarthur.

Johnston was promoted to the rank of lieutenant-colonel on 25 April 1808, and was superseded by his senior officer Joseph Foveaux, who was Lieutenant-Governor of Norfolk Island, on 28 July. Johnston sailed for England with John Macarthur in March 1809 and was tried by court-martial in May 1811. He was convicted of mutiny and sentenced to be cashiered.

== Later life ==
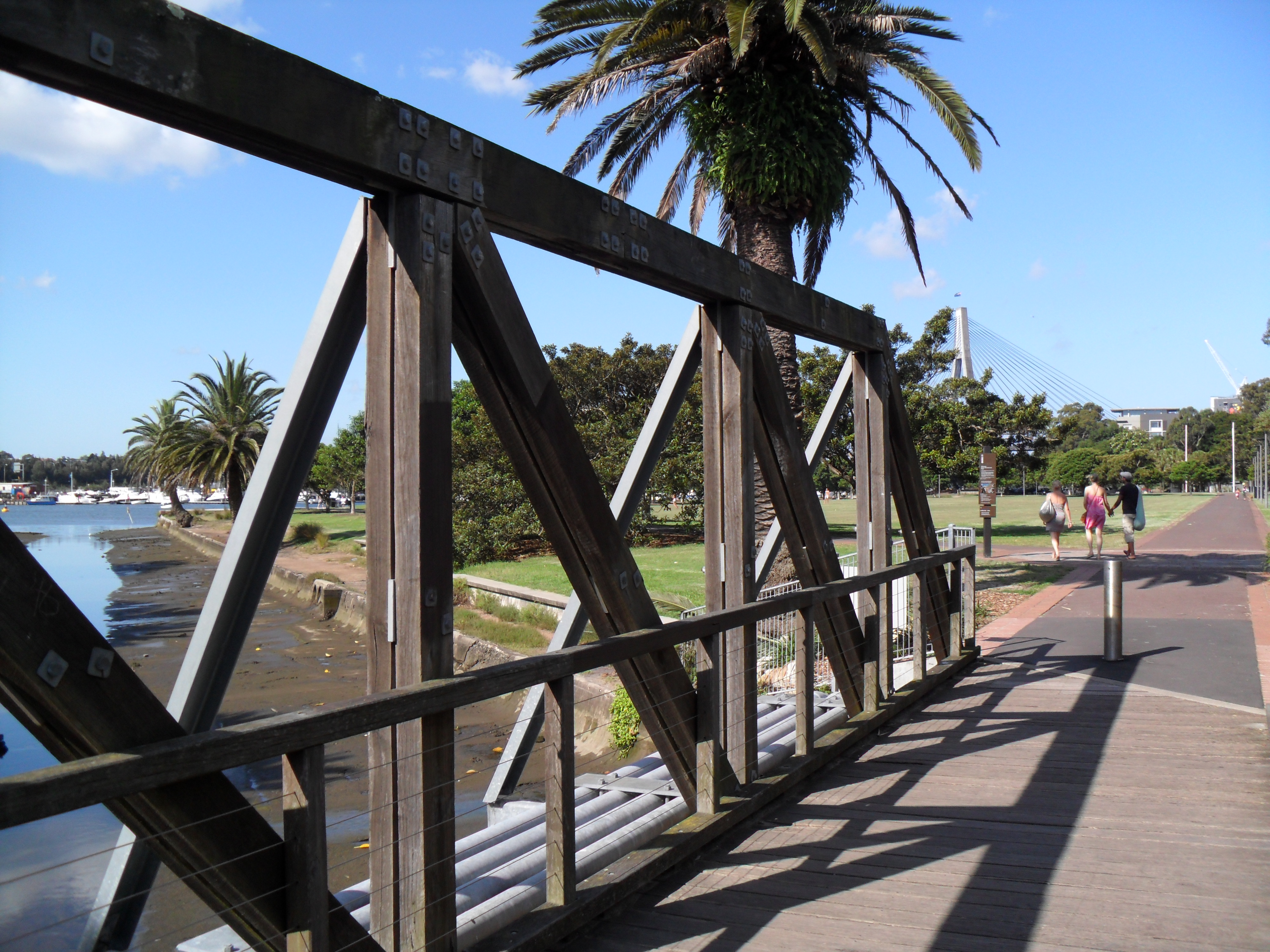
Johnstons Creek pedestrian bridge

Johnston returned to New South Wales in May 1813 as a private individual and, in November the following year, at St John's Church in Parramatta, he married Esther Abrahams, a Jewish convict whom he had met on the transport Lady Penrhyn in 1787. The couple had already had seven children together by that time, and they lived on his land at Annandale Farm, Sydney. He died on 5 January 1823. He was first interred in a private mausoleum on his Annandale property, until its subdivision to become an inner-city suburb. His remains were moved to a new mausoleum at Waverley Cemetery in 1904.

The suburb of Georges Hall is named after the farmhouse of the same name on land grants Johnston received near the junction of the Georges River and Prospect Creek. This building still exists and is now one of Australia's oldest houses. Johnston and Esther Abrahams and their children farmed and lived on Annandale until the 1870s, when the property was sold and sub-divided for residential development. The main street of Annandale is named after Johnston, and the gates of their property now stand in the grounds of Annandale Public School.

The suburb of Annangrove, founded by George Johnston's grandson Edward Charles Johnston, was named in honour of George Johnston's town of birth.
