= Albert Johnson (Mississippi politician) =

Mississippi politician

Member of the Mississippi House of Representatives
- In office 1870–1871

Personal details
- Born: Kentucky, U.S.
- Party: Republican
- Profession: Politician

Albert Johnson was an American state legislator in Mississippi. He represented Warren County, Mississippi in the Mississippi House of Representatives in 1870 and 1871.

He was born in Kentucky. He was enslaved and worked as a plasterer. In 1868, the Vicksburg Herald newspaper ran an account of an event at which he gave a speech. He was the first African American to serve on Warren County's Board of Supervisors. He was a Republican. In 1872 the paper reported that Johnson "cow-hides" a "carpetbagger".

He repudiated the view of a local reverend and stated he wanted harmony between blacks and whites.
