= Herb Johnson (footballer) =

Australian rules footballer

Personal information
- Full name: Herbert Magnus Johnson
- Born: 2 November 1879; Bendigo, Victoria
- Died: 20 October 1942 (aged 62); Richmond, Victoria
- Original team: Montague
- Height: 174 cm (5 ft 9 in)
- Weight: 73 kg (161 lb)

Playing career^{1}
Years	Club	Games (Goals)
1897	Collingwood	1 (0)
- ^{1} Playing statistics correct to the end of 1897.

Herbert Magnus Johnson (2 November 1879 – 20 October 1942) was an Australian rules footballer who played with Collingwood in the Victorian Football League (VFL).
