= Albert Johnson (footballer, born 1923) =

English footballer

Personal information
- Date of birth: 7 September 1923
- Place of birth: Morpeth, England
- Date of death: December 1989 (aged 66)
- Place of death: Northampton, England
- Position: Full back

Senior career*
Years	Team	Apps	(Gls)
- Ashington
1947–1950	Bradford City	35	(0)
- Kettering Town
- * Club domestic league appearances and goals

Albert Johnson (7 September 1923 – December 1989) was an English professional footballer who played as a full back.

== Career ==
Born in Morpeth, Johnson signed for Bradford City in January 1947 from Ashington, leaving the club in 1950 to sign for Kettering Town. During his time with Bradford City he made 35 appearances in the Football League.

== Sources ==
- Frost, Terry (1988). Bradford City A Complete Record 1903-1988. Breedon Books Sport. ISBN 0-907969-38-0.
