= Hubert Johnston (cricketer) =

Scottish cricketer

Personal information
- Full name: Robert Herbert Johnston
- Born: 1 May 1865; Edinburgh, Midlothian, Scotland
- Died: 1 February 1910 (aged 44); Edinburgh, Midlothian, Scotland
- Batting: Right-handed

Domestic team information
- Years: Team
- 1905: Scotland

Career statistics
Competition	First-class
Matches	1
Runs scored	13
Batting average	6.50
100s/50s	–/–
Top score	13
Catches/stumpings	2/–
- Source: Cricinfo, 1 November 2022

Robert Herbert 'Hubert' Johnston (1 May 1865 — 15 February 1910) was a Scottish first-class cricketer and solicitor.

The son of Robert Bruce Johnston, he was born at Edinburgh in May 1865. He was educated at the Edinburgh Academy, before attending Clifton College in England. From Clifton College, he matriculated to the University of Edinburgh, and was admitted to the Society of Writers to Her Majesty's Signet in 1890 in his capacity as a solicitor. Johnston played club cricketer for Grange, captaining the club. He first played for Scotland in a minor match against the touring Parsees in 1886. He continued to represent Scotland in minor matches throughout the 1890s, later captaining the side against the touring Australians in 1902, although the match was not afforded first-class status. He subsequently captained Scotland against the Australians in 1905, which was their first match to be afforded first-class status. Batting twice in the match, he was dismissed for 13 runs by Bill Howell in Scotland's first innings, while in their second innings he was dismissed without scoring by Tibby Cotter.

Outside of cricket, Johnston played inter-city rugby and was noted as being an able footballer and golfer; in golf, he was a member of the Honourable Company of Edinburgh Golfers and was successful in golf competitions held there in 1893 and 1894, winning silver and gold respectively, and was subsequently recorder for the club. His membership of Scottish golf clubs extended to The Royal and Ancient Golf Club of St Andrews. Johnston assisted at the University of Edinburgh as secretary to its curators. He died suddenly on 15 February 1910, while attending the Edinburgh University Ball.
