= Albert Johnston =

Albert Johnston may refer to:

- Albert Sidney Johnston (1803–1862), US Army officer, Texas Army general, and Confederate States general
- Albert Johnson (soccer) (1880–1941), Canadian amateur
- Albert Johnston (rugby league) (1892–1961), Australian rugby league footballer and coach
- Albert C. Johnston (died 1988), American doctor

== See also ==
- Albert Johnson (disambiguation)
- Bert Johnston (disambiguation)
