= Robert Johnston (1783–1839) =

Scottish slave plantation owner in Jamaica (1783-1839)

Robert Johnston (1783–1839) was a plantation owner in Jamaica and an investor in the London & Greenwich Railway.

== Life ==
He was the son of Alexander Johnston (died 1786), owner of the Murphy's Penn estate in Saint Ann Parish, Jamaica, and his wife Elizabeth Collett Gilbert. He went on a European Grand Tour towards the end of the Napoleonic Wars, after schooling in Aberdeen. He visited Moscow in 1812, after its burning.

Later Johnston owned the Harmony Hill estate in Jamaica, for which he received compensation. He moved in 1833 to Rhode Island, at the period of emancipation.

Johnston was one of the founders of the Southampton and London Railway and Dock Company, in 1831, with George Walter, and Abel Rous Dottin, also from Jamaica and a relation. The company failed. He had had earlier business associations with Walter. Planning for the London & Greenwich Railway occurred at an initial meeting held in Dottin's house in Argyle Street, London, where Johnston was present. After a time on the board of the company, he left it with his emigration to the United States.

== Family ==
Johnston married in 1818 Catherine Cole Taylor, heiress to Harmony Hill. Their daughter Mary married Samuel Powel (1818–1885), son of John Hare Powel.
