= Bobby Beattie =

Scottish footballer (1916–2002)

Personal information
- Full name: Robert Beattie
- Date of birth: 24 January 1916
- Place of birth: Stevenston, Scotland
- Date of death: 21 September 2002 (aged 86)
- Place of death: Irvine, Scotland
- Position: Inside forward

Senior career*
| Years | Team | Apps | (Gls) |
| – | Kilwinning Rangers | | |
| 1932–1937 | Kilmarnock | 120 | (43) |
| 1937–1954 | Preston North End | 264 | (49) |
| 1954–1956 | Wigan Athletic | 19 | (5) |
| Total | | 403 | (97) |

International career
| 1938 | Scotland | 1 | (0) |
- * Club domestic league appearances and goals

Robert Beattie (24 January 1916 – 21 September 2002) was a Scottish footballer, who played for Kilwinning Rangers, Kilmarnock, Preston North End and Wigan Athletic. He made one appearance for Scotland in 1938.

Beattie started his senior career with Kilmarnock and scored 43 goals in 120 Scottish Football League appearances for the club. He was sold to Preston North End in October 1937 for £2,500. He joined a club which already had several Scottish players, including Andy Beattie and Bill Shankly. During his first season with the club, Beattie was part of the team that won the 1938 FA Cup Final. Competitive football stopped due to the Second World War, but Beattie continued to play for Preston when the Football League resumed in 1946–47 and did not leave the club until 1953. He made a total of 264 appearances in the Football League, scoring 49 goals. He finished his career with Wigan Athletic, appearing 19 times in the Lancashire Combination and scoring five times.

== Honours ==
Preston North End

- FA Cup: 1937–38
