= Robert Johnston (cricketer) =

New Zealand cricketer

Robert J. Johnston (1849 – 17 December 1897) was a Scottish-born New Zealand cricketer who played for Otago during the 1872–73 and 1873–74 seasons.

Johnston was born in Scotland in 1849. He made two first-class appearances for Otago, both against Canterbury. His debut came in February 1873 at Christchurch in the only match played in New Zealand during the 1872–73 season that is deemed to have first-class status. He recorded a duck ins first innings before scoring six in his second; the following season he scored a single run in the only innings in which he batted.

Johnston died in 1897, drowning in the Earnscleugh River.
