= Bobby Johnstone (footballer, born 1918) =

Scottish footballer

Personal information
- Full name: Robert Rutherford Johnstone
- Date of birth: 13 September 1918
- Place of birth: Cleland, Scotland
- Date of death: 13 May 2007 (aged 88)
- Place of death: Chester, England
- Position: Wing half

Senior career*
Years	Team	Apps	(Gls)
1946–1948	Tranmere Rovers	40	(0)
- * Club domestic league appearances and goals

Bobby Johnstone (13 September 1918 – 13 May 2007) was a Scottish footballer, who played as a wing half in the Football League for Tranmere Rovers.
