= Rum Rebellion =

1808 coup in Britain's New South Wales Colony

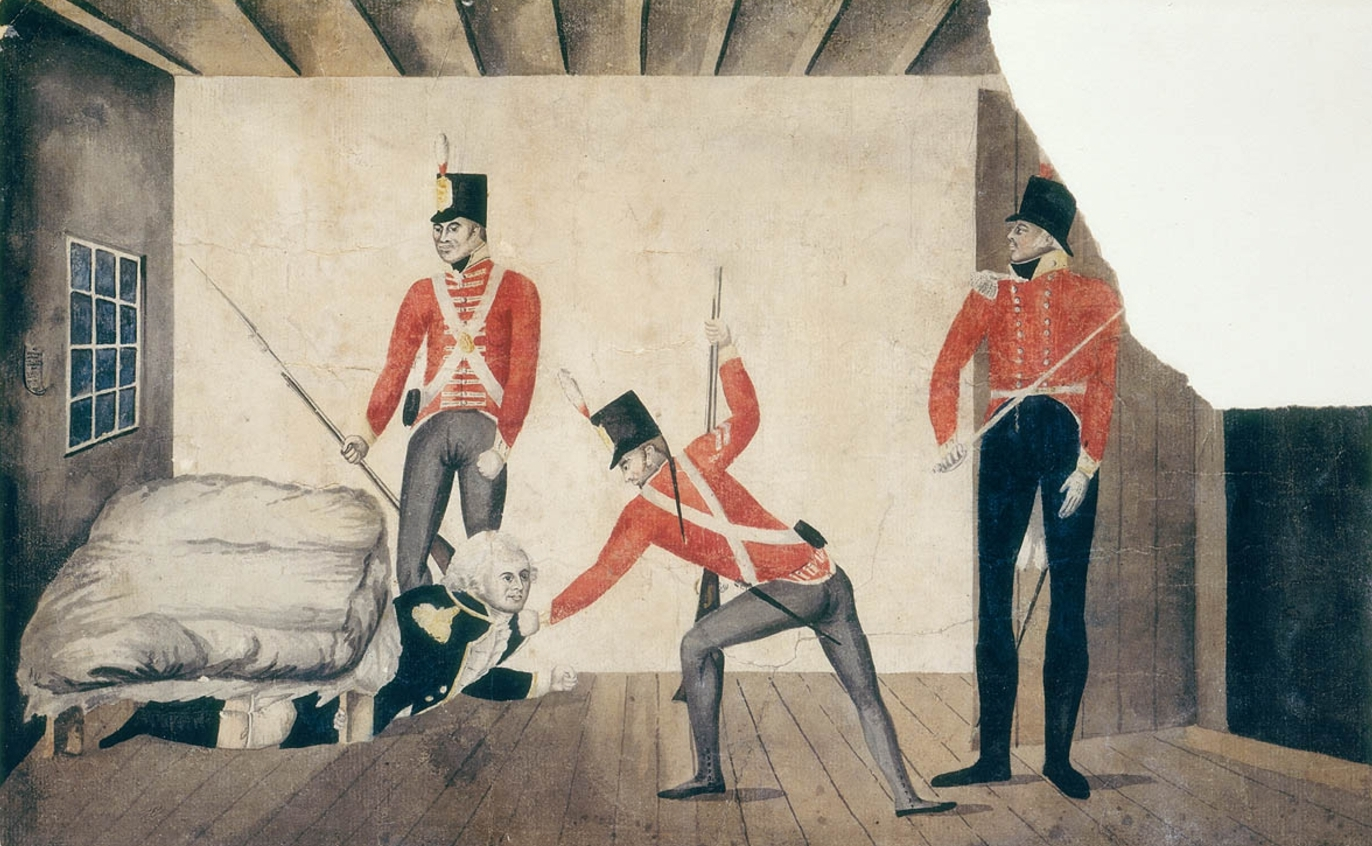
- A propaganda cartoon exhibited in Sydney within hours of William Bligh's arrest, portraying him as a coward
Date	26 January 1808 – 1 January 1810 (1 year, 11 months and 6 days)
Location	Sydney, New South Wales Colony
Result	After initial rebel success in 1808: Deposition and arrest of NSW Governor William Bligh; Imposition of martial law; Installation of Maj. George Johnston as Governor.; Installation of John Macarthur as Colonial Secretary.; After defeat of rebellion in 1810: Withdrawal and disbandment of NSW Corps in disgrace.; Appointment of Lachlan Macquarie as governor.

Belligerents
(United Kingdom) Colony of New South Wales	New South Wales Corps

Commanders and leaders
William Bligh	Major George Johnston; John Macarthur

Strength
	~400

The Rum Rebellion of 1808 was a coup d'état in the British penal colony of New South Wales, staged by the New South Wales Corps in order to depose Governor William Bligh. Australia's first and only military coup to date, its name derives from the illicit rum trade of early Sydney, over which the 'Rum Corps', as it became known, maintained a monopoly. During the first half of the 19th century, it was widely referred to in Australia as the Great Rebellion.

Bligh, a former Royal Navy captain known for his overthrow in the mutiny on the Bounty, had been appointed governor in 1805 to rein in the power of the Corps. Over the next two years, Bligh made enemies not only of Sydney's military elite, but several prominent civilians, notably John Macarthur, who joined Major George Johnston in organising an armed takeover. On 26 January 1808, 400 soldiers marched on Government House and arrested Bligh. He was kept in confinement in Sydney, then aboard a ship off Hobart, Van Diemen's Land, for the next two years while Johnston acted as Lieutenant-Governor of New South Wales. The military remained in control until the 1810 arrival from Britain of Major-General Lachlan Macquarie, who took over as governor.

== Bligh's appointment as governor ==
William Bligh succeeded Philip Gidley King. Bligh was well known for his overthrow in the mutiny on the Bounty. It is likely that he was deliberately selected by the British government because of his reputation as a "hard man" and was expected to have a good chance of reining in the maverick New South Wales Corps; something that his predecessors had not been able to do. Bligh left for Sydney with his daughter, Mary Putland, and her husband, Lieutenant John Putland, while Bligh's wife remained in England.

Even before his arrival, Bligh's style of governance led to problems with his subordinates. The Admiralty gave command of the storeship HMS Porpoise and the convoy to the lower-ranked Captain Joseph Short, while Bligh took command of a transport ship. This led to quarrels which eventually resulted in Captain Short firing across Bligh's bow in an attempt to force Bligh to obey his signals. When this failed, Short tried to give an order to Lieutenant Putland to stand by to fire on Bligh's ship. Bligh boarded Porpoise and seized control of the convoy.

When they arrived in Sydney, Bligh, backed up by statements from two of Short's officers, had Short stripped of the captaincy of Porpoise – which he gave to his son-in-law, cancelled the 240-hectare (600-acre) land grant Short had been promised as payment for the voyage, and shipped him back to England for court-martial. Short was acquitted. The president of the court, Sir Isaac Coffin, wrote to the Admiralty and made several serious accusations against Bligh, including that he had influenced the officers to testify against Short. Bligh's wife obtained a statement from one of the officers denying this, and Banks and other supporters of Bligh lobbied successfully against his recall as governor.

=== Arrival in Sydney ===
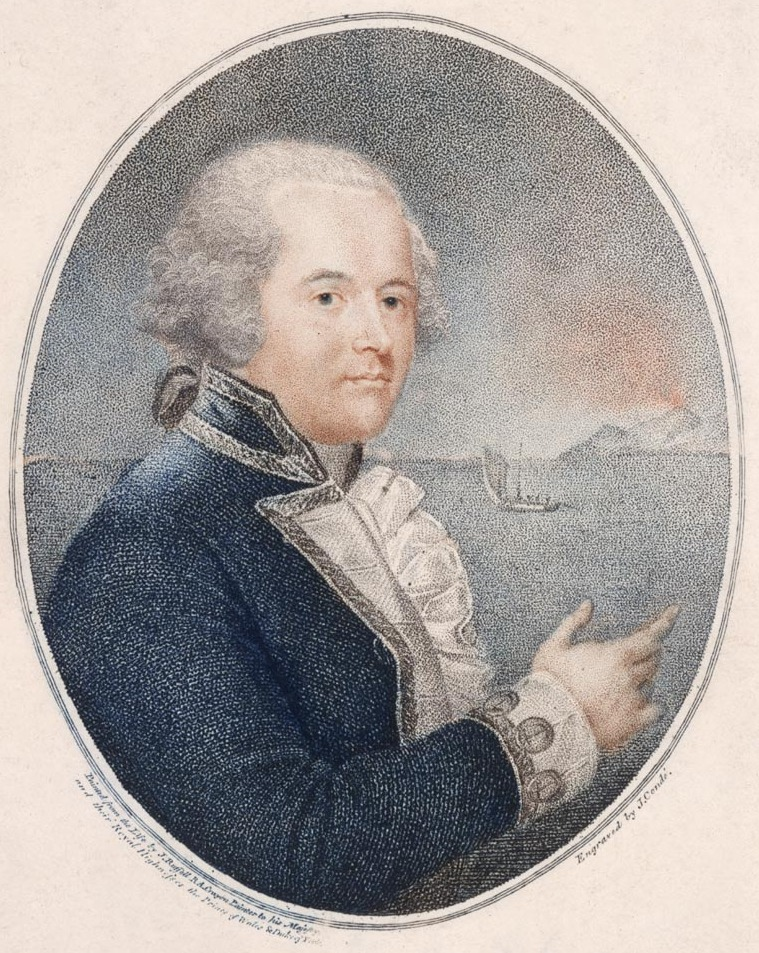
William Bligh

Soon after his arrival at Sydney, in August 1806, Bligh was given an address of welcome signed by Major George Johnston for the military, by Richard Atkins for the civilian officers, and by John Macarthur for the free settlers. However, not long after, Bligh also received addresses from the free and freed settlers of Sydney and the Hawkesbury River region, with a total of 369 signatures, many made only with a cross, complaining that Macarthur did not represent them. They blamed him for withholding sheep so as to raise the price of mutton.

One of Bligh's first actions was to use the colony's stores and herds to provide relief to farmers who had been severely affected by flooding on the Hawkesbury River, a situation that had disrupted the barter economy in the colony. Supplies were divided according to those most in need, and provisions were made for loans to be drawn from the store based on capacity to repay. This earned Bligh the gratitude of the farmers, but the enmity of traders in the Corps who had been profiting greatly from the situation.

Under instructions from the Colonial Office, Bligh attempted to normalise trading conditions in the colony by prohibiting the use of spirits as payment for commodities. He communicated his policy to the Colonial Office in 1807, with the advice that his policy would be met with resistance. On 31 December 1807 Robert Stewart, Viscount Castlereagh, Secretary of State for War and the Colonies, wrote back to Bligh with instructions to stop the barter of spirits.

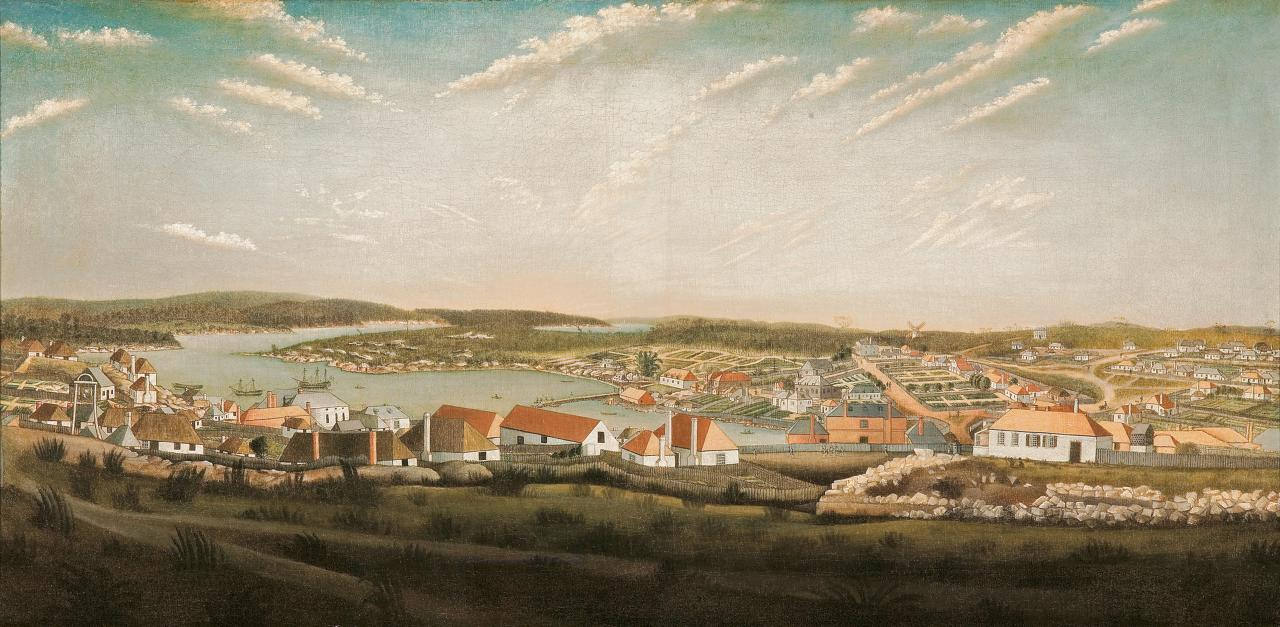
Painting of Sydney, c. 1799

H. V. Evatt concludes in his history of the Rebellion that Bligh "was authorised to prevent free importation, to preserve the trade under his entire control, to enforce all penalties against illegal import, and to establish regulations at his discretion for the sale of spirits". He argues that the enmity of the monopolists within the colony stemmed from this prohibition and other policies which counteracted the power of the rich and promoted the welfare of the poor settlers. Bligh ceased the practice of handing out large land grants to the powerful in the colony; during his term, he granted just over 1,600 hectares of land, half of it to his daughter and himself.

Bligh also caused controversy by allowing a group of Irish convicts to be tried for revolt by a court that included their accusers. But when six of the eight were acquitted, he ordered them kept under arrest anyway. He dismissed D'Arcy Wentworth from his position of Assistant Surgeon to the Colony without explanation, and sentenced three merchants to a month's imprisonment and a fine for writing a letter that he considered offensive. Bligh also dismissed Thomas Jamison from the magistracy, describing him in 1807 as being "inimical" to good government. Jamison was the highly capable (if crafty) Surgeon-General of New South Wales, and had accumulated significant personal wealth as a maritime trader; he was also a friend and business partner of the powerful Macarthur.

In October 1807 Major Johnston wrote a formal letter of complaint to the Commander-in-Chief of the British Army, stating that Bligh was abusive and interfering with the troops of the New South Wales Corps. Bligh had clearly made enemies of some of the most influential people in the colony. He also antagonised some of the less wealthy when he ordered those who had leases on government land within Sydney to remove their houses.

=== Enmity between Bligh and Macarthur ===
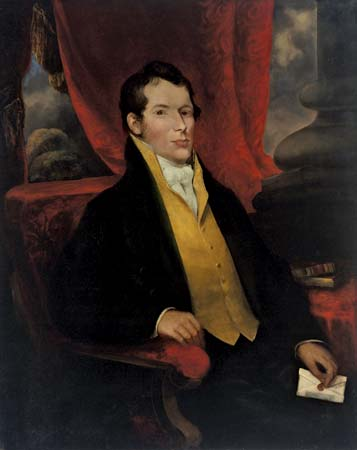
John Macarthur

Macarthur had arrived with the New South Wales Corps in 1790 as a lieutenant, and by 1805 he had substantial farming and commercial interests in the colony. He had quarrelled with the governors preceding Bligh and had fought three duels.

Bligh and Macarthur's interests clashed in a number of ways. Bligh stopped Macarthur from cheaply distributing large quantities of rum into the Corps and halted his allegedly illegal importation of stills. Macarthur's interest in an area of land granted to him by King conflicted with Bligh's town-planning interests. The two men were also engaged in other disagreements, including a conflict over landing regulations. In June 1807, a convict had stowed away and escaped Sydney on Macarthur's schooner Paramatta. When Parramatta returned to Sydney in December 1807, the bond held to ensure that masters and owners of vessels did not help prisoners escape the colony was deemed to be forfeited.

Bligh had the Judge Advocate, Richard Atkins, issue an order for Macarthur to appear on the matter of the bond on 15 December 1807. Macarthur disobeyed the order, was arrested and bailed, and failed to appear for trial at the next sitting of the Sydney Criminal Court on 25 January 1808. Atkins rejected this, but Macarthur's protest had the support of the other six members of the court, all officers of the New South Wales Corps. Macarthur objected to Atkins being fit to sit in judgement of him because he was his debtor and inveterate enemy. Without the Judge Advocate, the trial could not take place and the court dissolved.

Bligh accused the six officers of what amounted to mutiny and summoned Johnston to come and deal with the matter. Johnston replied that he was ill, as he had wrecked his gig on the evening of 24 January on his way home to his farm after dining with officers of the Corps.

== Overthrow of Governor Bligh ==
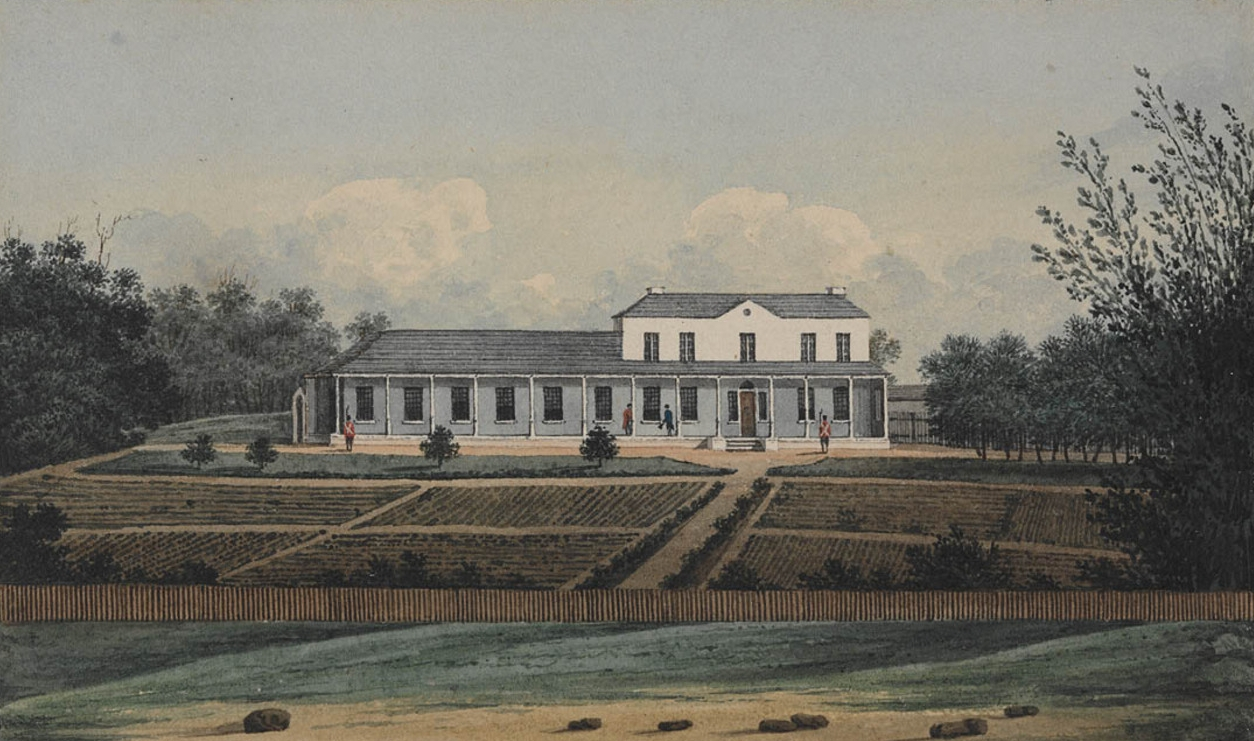
Watercolour drawing of First Government House, Sydney, ca. 1809

On the morning of 26 January 1808, Bligh again ordered that Macarthur be arrested and also ordered the return of court papers, which were held by officers of the New South Wales Corps. The Corps responded with a request for a new Judge Advocate and the release of Macarthur on bail. Bligh summoned the officers to Government House to answer charges made by Atkins, and he informed Johnston that he considered the action of the officers of the Corps to be treasonable.

Johnston, instead, visited the jail and issued an order releasing Macarthur, who drafted a petition calling for Johnston to arrest Bligh and take charge of the colony. This petition was signed by the officers of the Corps and other prominent citizens but, according to Evatt, most signatures had probably been added only after Bligh was safely under house arrest. Johnston consulted with the officers and issued an order stating that Bligh was "charged by the respectable inhabitants of crimes that render you unfit to exercise the supreme authority another moment in this colony; and in that charge all officers under my command have joined." Johnston went on to call for Bligh to resign and submit to arrest.

At 6:00 pm, the Corps, with full band and colours, marched to Government House to arrest Bligh. They were hindered by his daughter and her parasol, but Captain Thomas Laycock finally found Bligh, in full dress uniform, behind his bed where he claimed he was hiding papers. Bligh was painted as a coward for this action, but Duffy argues that if Bligh was hiding, it would have been to escape and thwart the coup. In his book Captain Bligh's Other Mutiny, Stephen Dando-Collins agrees and suggests that Bligh was planning to escape to the Hawkesbury River and to lead settlers there who were strongly supportive of him. During 1808 Bligh and his daughter were confined to Government House under house arrest. Bligh refused to leave for England until lawfully relieved of his duty.

On 26 January 1808, Johnston took control of the colony and assumed the title of lieutenant-governor. and appointed Charles Grimes, the Surveyor-General, as Judge Advocate. He ordered Macarthur and the six officers be tried; they were found not guilty. Macarthur was appointed as Colonial Secretary and effectively ran the business affairs of the colony.

Another prominent opponent of Bligh, Macarthur's ally Thomas Jamison, was appointed as the colony's Naval Officer (the equivalent of Collector of Customs and Excise) and also reinstated as a magistrate. This enabled him and his fellow legal officers to scrutinise Bligh's personal papers for evidence of wrongdoing. In June 1809 Jamison sailed to London to bolster his business interests and give evidence against Bligh in any legal prosecutions that might be brought against the mutineers. He died in London at the beginning of 1811, however, so could not testify at Johnston's court martial in June of that year.

Shortly after the coup, a watercolour by an unknown artist, illustrating Bligh's arrest, was exhibited in Sydney at perhaps Australia's first public art exhibition. The watercolour depicts a Corps soldier dragging Bligh from underneath one of the servants' beds in Government House, with two other soldiers standing by. The two soldiers in the watercolour are most likely John Sutherland and Michael Marlborough, and the other figure on the far right is believed to represent Lieutenant William Minchin. This watercolour is Australia's earliest surviving political cartoon. The Corps regarded themselves as gentlemen and in depicting Bligh as a coward, the cartoon declares that Bligh was not a gentleman and therefore not fit to govern.

The origins of the watercolour derive from a dispute between Bligh and Sergeant Major Whittle about Bligh demanding Whittle to pull down his house as it was halting improvements to the town. It has been suggested Whittle either commissioned the painting or had painted the watercolour himself, but neither is likely as Whittle was illiterate.

=== A new governor is appointed ===
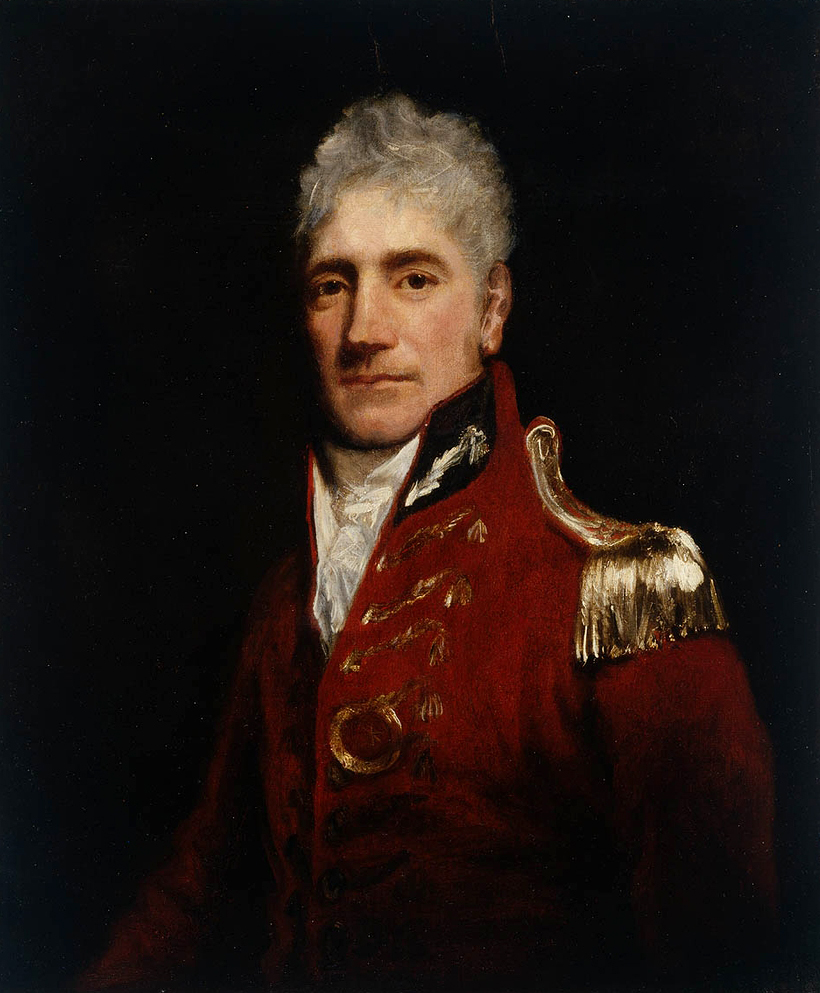
Lachlan Macquarie, c. early 1800s

Following Bligh's overthrow, Johnston had notified his superior officer, Colonel William Paterson of events. At the time, Paterson was in Van Diemen's Land (now called Tasmania) establishing a settlement at Port Dalrymple (now Launceston). He was reluctant to get involved until clear orders arrived from England. When he learned in March that Lieutenant-Colonel Joseph Foveaux was returning to Sydney with orders to become acting Lieutenant-Governor of New South Wales, Paterson left Foveaux to deal with the prevailing situation.

Foveaux arrived in July and took over the colony as lieutenant-colonel on 28 July 1808, which annoyed Macarthur. Since a decision was expected from England, and feeling that Bligh's behaviour had been insufferable, Foveaux left Bligh under house arrest. He turned his attention to improving the colony's roads, bridges and public buildings, which he felt had been badly neglected. When there was still no word from England, he summoned Paterson to Sydney in January 1809 to sort out matters. Paterson sent Johnston and Macarthur to England for trial, and confined Bligh to the barracks until he signed a contract agreeing to return to England. Paterson, whose health was failing, retired to Government House and left Foveaux to run the colony.

In January 1809 Bligh was given the control of HMS Porpoise on condition that he return to England. However, Bligh sailed to Hobart in Van Diemen's Land, seeking the support of Lieutenant-Governor David Collins to retake control of the New South Wales Colony. Collins refused to support him and on Paterson's orders, Bligh remained cut off on board Porpoise, moored at the mouth of the River Derwent south of Hobart, until January 1810.

The Colonial Office finally decided that sending naval governors to rule the New South Wales Colony was untenable. Instead the New South Wales Corps, now known as the 102nd Regiment of Foot, was to be recalled to England and replaced with the 73rd Regiment of Foot, whose commanding officer would take over as governor. Bligh was to be reinstated for twenty-four hours, then recalled to England; Johnston sent to England for court martial; and Macarthur tried in Sydney. Major-General Lachlan Macquarie was put in charge of the mission after Major-General Miles Nightingall fell ill before departure. Macquarie took over as governor with an elaborate ceremony on 1 January 1810.

== Aftermath ==
Macquarie reinstated all the officials who had been sacked by Johnston and Macarthur, replaced the alcoholic Atkins with Ellis Bent (the first professional lawyer to occupy a public post in Australia) as Judge Advocate, and cancelled all land and stock grants that had been made since Bligh's deposition. To calm things down, he made grants that he thought appropriate and prevented any reprisals. When Bligh received the news of Macquarie's arrival, he sailed to Sydney, arriving on 17 January 1810 to collect evidence for the forthcoming court martial of Johnston. He departed for the trial in England on 12 May, arriving on 25 October 1810 aboard Hindostan.

Having informally heard arguments from both sides, the government authorities in England were not impressed by either Macarthur and Johnston's accusations against Bligh, nor by Bligh's ill-tempered letters accusing key figures in the colony of unacceptable conduct. Johnston was court-martialled, found guilty and cashiered, the lowest penalty possible. He was able to return as a free citizen to his estate, Annandale, in Sydney. Macarthur was not tried but was refused permission to return to New South Wales until 1817, since he would not admit his wrongdoing. Bligh's promotion to rear admiral was held up until the end of Johnston's trial. Afterward it was backdated to 31 July 1810, and Bligh took up a position that had been kept for him. He continued his naval career in the Admiralty, without command, and died of cancer in Bond Street, London in 1817.

Macquarie had been impressed with Foveaux's administration, putting his name forward to succeed Collins as Lieutenant-Governor of Tasmania because he could think of no one more fitting; and considered that he could not have acted otherwise with regard to Bligh. However, when Foveaux returned to England in 1810 he was court-martialled for assenting to Bligh being deposed and imprisoned; Macquarie's recommendation was ignored. Foveaux was taken back into active service in 1811 and promoted to lieutenant-colonel of the 1st Regiment Greek Light Infantry. He pursued an uneventful military career after that, rising to the rank of lieutenant-general.

== Causes ==
Michael Duffy, an author writing in 2006, says

Essentially it was the culmination of a long-running tussle for power between the government and private entrepreneurs, a fight over the future and the nature of the colony. The early governors wanted to keep NSW as a large-scale open prison, with a primitive economy based on yeomen ex-convicts and run by government fiat.

Duffy goes on to say that the Rebellion was not thought of at the time as being about rum:

... almost no one at the time of the rebellion thought it was about rum. Bligh tried briefly to give it that spin, to smear his opponents, but there was no evidence for it and he moved on.

Many years later, in 1855, an English Quaker named William Howitt published a popular history of Australia. Like many teetotallers, he was keen to blame alcohol for all the problems in the world. Howitt took Bligh's side and invented the phrase Rum Rebellion, and it has stuck ever since.

The Biography of Early Australia dismisses Macarthur's complaints as ridiculous and quotes Evatt as saying that legally Macarthur was guilty of two out of the three charges brought against him, including sedition. Both consider that Bligh was wholly justified in his actions because he was the legitimate authority. Duffy asserts that had Johnston arrived when summoned on 25 January, the Rum Rebellion probably would never have happened.

== In popular culture ==
- It was adapted for the stage and radio play The House That Jack Built in 1951
- In 1951 it was reported that Carey Wilson was researching a movie version of the rebellion for Hollywood studio MGM to be called Rum Rebellion.
- It was the subject of a 1960 Australian TV series Stormy Petrel.
- The TV miniseries Against the Wind includes events of the Rum Rebellion in episode 12.
- It provides the backdrop for the novel Desolation Island by Patrick O'Brian, in which Captain Jack Aubrey is sent to Australia to intervene on Bligh's behalf.
- It is referenced in the novel Tongues of Serpents by Naomi Novik.

== See also ==
- Eureka Rebellion
- Darwin Rebellion
- Whiskey Rebellion (North America, 1790s)
- Whisky War (Liquor Wars)

== Bibliography ==
- Allen, Matthew. "Alcohol and Authority in Early New South Wales: The Symbolic Significance of the Spirit Trade, 1788–1808" History Australia 9 (3) 2012 pp 7–26 https://www.tandfonline.com/doi/abs/10.1080/14490854.2012.11668428
- Atkinson, Alan. "The Little Revolution in New South Wales, 1808" 12 (1) Feb 1990 pp. 65–75 https://www.jstor.org/stable/40106133?seq=1#page_scan_tab_contents
- Brunton, Paul. 1808: Bligh’s Sydney Rebellion (2008) https://www2.sl.nsw.gov.au/archive/events/exhibitions/2008/politicspower/docs/bligh_guide.pdf
- Dando-Collins, Stephen, Captain Bligh's Other Mutiny: The True Story of the Military Coup that Turned Australia into a Two-Year Rebel Republic, Sydney, Random House, 2007.
- Davis, Russell Earls. Bligh in Australia: A New Appraisal of William Bligh and the Rum Rebellion. Woodslane Press, 2010.
- Duffy, Michael, Man of Honour: John Macarthur, Sydney, Macmillan Australia, 2003.
- Dunk, Dr James. "The Rum Rebellion and the Madness of Colonial New South Wales" Dictionary of Sydney | 9 May 2018 http://home.dictionaryofsydney.org/the-rum-rebellion-and-the-madness-of-colonial-new-south-wales/
- Evatt, H.V., Rum Rebellion: A Study of the Overthrow of Governor Bligh By John Macarthur and the New South Wales, 1943.
- Tom Frame (23 January 2008). "Who'll Watch Guardians When Ex-officers Rule Us?". The Australian. Archived from the original on 12 June 2008.
- Fitzgerald, Ross and Hearn, Mark, Bligh, Macarthur and the Rum Rebellion, Kenthurst: Kangaroo Press, 1988.
- Gilling, Tom. Grog: a bottled history of Australia’s first 30 years. Hachette, 2016, pp 246–276.
- Holt, Joseph. A Rum Story: The Adventures of Joseph Holt Thirteen Years in New South Wales 1800–1812. Kangaroo Press, 1988, pp 107–111.
- Hughes, Robert. The Fatal Shore. Alfred A Knopf, 1986.
- Karskens, Grace and Richard Waterhouse. "’Too Sacred to Be Taken Away': Property, Liberty, Tyranny and the 'Rum Rebellion'" Journal of Australian Colonial History Volume 12 (2010) https://search.informit.com.au/documentSummary;dn=210497657917906;res=IELHSS
- Lisle, Phillip. "Rum beginnings: towards a new perspective of the Grose years." Journal of the Royal Australian Historical Society Volume 91 Issue 1 (June 2005) https://search.informit.com.au/documentSummary;dn=200506524;res=IELAPA
- McAskill, Tracey. "An asset to the colony: the social and economic contribution of corpsmen to early New South Wales." Journal of the Royal Australian Historical Society Volume 82 Issue 1 (June 1996) https://search.informit.com.au/documentSummary;dn=961000224;res=IELAPA
- McMahon, John. "Not a rum rebellion but a military insurrection". Journal of the Royal Australian Historical Society. Volume 92 Issue 2 (Dec 2006): 125–144; https://search.informit.com.au/documentSummary;dn=200700420;res=IELAPA
- Hughes, Robert (1986). The Fatal Shore. Alfred A. Knopf, Inc. ISBN 0-394-50668-5.
- Office of the Environment and Heritage. The rum track: Places associated with the 'Rum Rebellion', 26th January 1808 to 1st January 1810 https://www.environment.nsw.gov.au/Heritage/research/rumtrack.htm
- Overton, Ned (ed). Mutiny; and the Trial of Lt. Col. Johnston: An Outline of the Rum Rebellion (2013). http://gutenberg.net.au/ebooks13/1300731h.html
- Ritchie, John, The Wentworths: Father and Son, Melbourne, Melbourne University Press, 1997.
- Spigelman, James (23 January 2008). "Coup that paved the way for our attention to rule of law". Opinion. The Sydney Morning Herald. (Spigelman is the Chief Justice of New South Wales.)
- Stratham, Pamela. "A new look at the New South Wales Corps, 1790–1810" Australian Economic History Review 30 (1) January 1990 pp 43–63 https://doi.org/10.1111/aehr.301003
