= 1907–08 Liverpool F.C. season =

English football club season

Liverpool F.C
1906–07 season
- Manager: Tom Watson
- Stadium: Anfield
- Football League: 8th
- FA Cup: Third round
- Top goalscorer: League: Joe Hewitt (21); All: Joe Hewitt (21)

The 1907–08 Liverpool F.C. season was the 16th season in existence for Liverpool.

== Squad statistics ==
=== Appearances and goals ===
No.	Pos	Nat	Player	Total		Division 1		F.A. Cup	
No.	Pos	Nat	Player	Apps	Goals	Apps	Goals	Apps	Goals
	FW	(England) ENG	Arthur Berry	1	0	1	0	0	0
	MF	(England) ENG	Sam Bowyer	5	0	4	0	1	0
	MF	(England) ENG	Jimmy Bradley	38	6	34	3	4	3
	DF	(England) ENG	Tom Chorlton	7	1	7	1	0	0
	MF	(England) ENG	Jack Cox	39	5	35	2	4	3
	GK	(Scotland) SCO	Ned Doig	5	0	5	0	0	0
	DF	(Scotland) SCO	Billy Dunlop	2	0	2	0	0	0
	FW	(England) ENG	Harry Fitzpatrick	4	2	4	2	0	0
	MF	(England) ENG	Arthur Goddard	39	4	35	4	4	0
	MF	(England) ENG	Jimmy Gorman	10	1	9	0	1	1
	MF	(England) ENG	Mick Griffin	2	0	2	0	0	0
	DF	(England) ENG	Harry Griffiths	1	0	1	0	0	0
	GK	(England) ENG	Sam Hardy	37	0	33	0	4	0
	DF	(England) ENG	Jimmy Harrop	8	0	8	0	0	0
	FW	(England) ENG	Charlie Hewitt	16	6	16	6	0	0
	FW	(England) ENG	Joe Hewitt	40	21	36	21	4	0
	MF	(England) ENG	Sam Hignett	1	0	1	0	0	0
	DF	(England) ENG	Jimmy Hughes	5	0	4	0	1	0
	DF	(Wales) WAL	George Latham	3	0	3	0	0	0
	FW	(Scotland) SCO	Billy McPherson	23	5	20	5	3	0
	FW	(Scotland) SCO	Ronald Orr	7	5	7	5	0	0
	FW	(England) ENG	Jack Parkinson	10	8	8	7	2	1
	MF	(Wales) WAL	Maurice Parry	24	0	21	0	3	0
	DF	(Scotland) SCO	Alex Raisbeck	26	2	23	2	3	0
	FW	(England) ENG	Robbie Robinson	26	9	24	9	2	0
	DF	(England) ENG	Tom Rogers	13	0	12	0	1	0
	DF	(England) ENG	Percy Saul	31	2	27	1	4	1
	MF	(England) ENG	Harold Uren	2	0	2	0	0	0
	DF	(England) ENG	Alf West	36	0	33	0	3	0

== Table ==
Pos	Team	Pld	W	D	L	GF	GA	GAv	Pts
6	Middlesbrough	38	17	7	14	54	45	1.200	41
7	Bury	38	14	11	13	58	61	0.951	39
8	Liverpool	38	16	6	16	68	61	1.115	38
9	Nottingham Forest	38	13	11	14	59	62	0.952	37
10	Bristol City	38	12	12	14	58	61	0.951	36

Source: World Football
Rules for classification: 1) Points; 2) Goal average; 3) Goals scored
