= 1906–07 Liverpool F.C. season =

English football club season

Liverpool F.C
1906–07 season
- Manager: Tom Watson
- Stadium: Anfield
- Football League: 15th
- FA Cup: Fourth round
- Top goalscorer: League: Sam Raybould (15); All: Sam Raybould (17)

The 1906–07 Liverpool F.C. season was the 15th season in existence for Liverpool.

== Squad statistics ==
=== Appearances and goals ===
No.	Pos	Nat	Player	Total		Division 1		F.A. Cup	
No.	Pos	Nat	Player	Apps	Goals	Apps	Goals	Apps	Goals
	FW	(England) ENG	Bob Blanthorne	2	1	2	1	0	0
	MF	(England) ENG	Jimmy Bradley	40	1	36	1	4	0
	FW	(England) ENG	John Carlin	8	0	8	0	0	0
	DF	(England) ENG	Tom Chorlton	15	0	14	0	1	0
	MF	(England) ENG	Jack Cox	29	8	25	7	4	1
	GK	(Scotland) SCO	Ned Doig	4	0	4	0	0	0
	DF	(Scotland) SCO	Billy Dunlop	27	0	23	0	4	0
	MF	(England) ENG	Arthur Goddard	39	3	35	3	4	0
	MF	(England) ENG	Jimmy Gorman	12	0	9	0	3	0
	DF	(England) ENG	Harry Griffiths	4	0	4	0	0	0
	GK	(England) ENG	Sam Hardy	38	0	34	0	4	0
	FW	(England) ENG	Joe Hewitt	23	7	23	7	0	0
	DF	(England) ENG	Jimmy Hughes	4	0	4	0	0	0
	DF	(Wales) WAL	George Latham	9	0	9	0	0	0
	MF	(England) ENG	Jack Lipsham	3	0	3	0	0	0
	MF	(England) ENG	John McKenna	1	0	1	0	0	0
	FW	(Scotland) SCO	Billy McPherson	32	12	28	11	4	1
	FW	(England) ENG	Jack Parkinson	13	7	9	7	4	0
	MF	(Wales) WAL	Maurice Parry	19	0	19	0	0	0
	DF	(Scotland) SCO	Alex Raisbeck	28	4	27	4	1	0
	FW	(England) ENG	Sam Raybould	39	17	35	15	4	2
	FW	(England) ENG	Robbie Robinson	32	8	28	8	4	0
	DF	(England) ENG	Tom Rogers	1	0	1	0	0	0
	DF	(England) ENG	Percy Saul	36	0	33	0	3	0
	DF	(England) ENG	Alf West	4	0	4	0	0	0

== Table ==
Pos	Team	Pld	W	D	L	GF	GA	GAv	Pts
13	The Wednesday	38	12	11	15	49	60	0.817	35
14	Preston North End	38	14	7	17	44	57	0.772	35
15	Liverpool	38	13	7	18	64	65	0.985	33
16	Bury	38	13	6	19	58	68	0.853	32
17	Manchester City	38	10	12	16	53	77	0.688	32

Source: World Football
Rules for classification: 1) Points; 2) Goal average; 3) Goals scored
