= 1908–09 Liverpool F.C. season =

English football club season

Liverpool F.C
1908–09 season
- Manager: Tom Watson
- Stadium: Anfield
- Football League: 16th
- FA Cup: Second round
- Top goalscorer: League: Ronald Orr (22); All: Ronald Orr (25)

The 1908–09 Liverpool F.C. season was the 17th season in existence for Liverpool.

== Squad statistics ==
=== Appearances and goals ===
No.	Pos	Nat	Player	Total		Division 1		F.A. Cup	
No.	Pos	Nat	Player	Apps	Goals	Apps	Goals	Apps	Goals
	FW	(England) ENG	Dick Allman	1	0	1	0	0	0
	FW	(England) ENG	Arthur Berry	2	0	2	0	0	0
	MF	(England) ENG	Sam Bowyer	14	4	14	4	0	0
	MF	(England) ENG	Jimmy Bradley	36	1	34	1	2	0
	DF	(England) ENG	Tom Chorlton	36	3	34	3	2	0
	MF	(England) ENG	Jack Cox	30	3	28	2	2	1
	DF	(Scotland) SCO	Bob Crawford	7	0	7	0	0	0
	DF	(Scotland) SCO	Billy Dunlop	13	0	12	0	1	0
	MF	(England) ENG	Arthur Goddard	38	4	36	4	2	0
	MF	(England) ENG	Bert Goode	6	0	6	0	0	0
	MF	(England) ENG	Mick Griffin	1	0	1	0	0	0
	GK	(England) ENG	Sam Hardy	34	0	32	0	2	0
	DF	(England) ENG	Jimmy Harrop	31	1	30	1	1	0
	FW	(England) ENG	Joe Hewitt	35	13	33	12	2	1
	DF	(England) ENG	Jimmy Hughes	17	0	17	0	0	0
	FW	(England) ENG	Bill Hunter	1	0	1	0	0	0
	FW	(Scotland) SCO	Ronald Orr	35	25	33	22	2	3
	FW	(England) ENG	Jack Parkinson	18	4	17	3	1	1
	MF	(Wales) WAL	Maurice Parry	22	0	20	0	2	0
	DF	(Wales) WAL	Ernie Peake	1	0	1	0	0	0
	DF	(Scotland) SCO	Alex Raisbeck	16	2	15	2	1	0
	FW	(England) ENG	Robbie Robinson	22	6	21	5	1	1
	DF	(England) ENG	Tom Rogers	6	0	6	0	0	0
	DF	(England) ENG	Percy Saul	16	0	15	0	1	0
	GK	(Scotland) SCO	Don Sloan	6	0	6	0	0	0
	MF	(England) ENG	Harold Uren	1	0	1	0	0	0
	DF	(England) ENG	Alf West	10	0	10	0	0	0

== Table ==
Pos	Team	Pld	W	D	L	GF	GA	GAv	Pts
14	Nottingham Forest	38	14	8	16	66	57	1.158	36
15	Notts County	38	14	8	16	51	48	1.063	36
16	Liverpool	38	15	6	17	57	65	0.877	36
17	Bury	38	14	8	16	63	77	0.818	36
18	Bradford City	38	12	10	16	47	47	1.000	34

Source: World Football
Rules for classification: 1) Points; 2) Goal average; 3) Goals scored
