= 1910–11 Liverpool F.C. season =

English football club season

Liverpool F.C
1910–11 season
- Manager: Tom Watson
- Stadium: Anfield
- Football League: 13th
- FA Cup: Second round
- Top goalscorer: League: Jack Parkinson (19); All: Jack Parkinson (20)

The 1910–11 Liverpool F.C. season was the 19th season in existence for Liverpool.

== Squad statistics ==
=== Appearances and goals ===
No.	Pos	Nat	Player	Total		Division 1		F.A. Cup	
No.	Pos	Nat	Player	Apps	Goals	Apps	Goals	Apps	Goals
	GK	(England) ENG	Augustus Beeby	11	0	11	0	0	0
	MF	(England) ENG	Sam Bowyer	14	6	13	4	1	2
	MF	(England) ENG	Jimmy Bradley	4	0	4	0	0	0
	FW	(England) ENG	Joe Brough	10	3	10	3	0	0
	DF	(England) ENG	Tom Chorlton	7	0	7	0	0	0
	DF	(Scotland) SCO	Bob Crawford	33	0	31	0	2	0
	FW	(Scotland) SCO	Sammy Gilligan	15	5	15	5	0	0
	MF	(England) ENG	Arthur Goddard	34	9	32	8	2	1
	GK	(England) ENG	Sam Hardy	29	0	27	0	2	0
	DF	(England) ENG	Jimmy Harrop	36	1	34	1	2	0
	MF	(England) ENG	Bert Leavey	5	0	5	0	0	0
	DF	(England) ENG	Ephraim Longworth	34	0	33	0	1	0
	MF	(Scotland) SCO	Jock McConnell	31	0	29	0	2	0
	MF	(Scotland) SCO	John McDonald	26	1	25	1	1	0
	DF	(Scotland) SCO	Donald McKinlay	2	0	2	0	0	0
	FW	(Scotland) SCO	Ronald Orr	32	5	30	5	2	0
	FW	(England) ENG	Jack Parkinson	34	20	33	19	1	1
	DF	(Wales) WAL	Ernie Peake	8	3	8	3	0	0
	FW	(England) ENG	Robbie Robinson	40	0	38	0	2	0
	DF	(England) ENG	Tom Rogers	2	0	2	0	0	0
	DF	(England) ENG	James Speakman	2	0	2	0	0	0
	MF	(Scotland) SCO	Jimmy Stewart	12	4	11	4	1	0
	MF	(England) ENG	Harold Uren	13	0	12	0	1	0
	DF	(England) ENG	Alf West	5	0	4	0	1	0

== Table ==
Pos	Team	Pld	W	D	L	GF	GA	GAv	Pts
11	Notts County	38	14	10	14	37	45	0.822	38
12	Blackburn Rovers	38	13	11	14	62	54	1.148	37
13	Liverpool	38	15	7	16	53	53	1.000	37
14	Preston North End	38	12	11	15	40	49	0.816	35
15	Tottenham Hotspur	38	13	6	19	52	63	0.825	32

Source: World Football
Rules for classification: 1) Points; 2) Goal average; 3) Goals scored
