= List of Liverpool F.C. seasons =

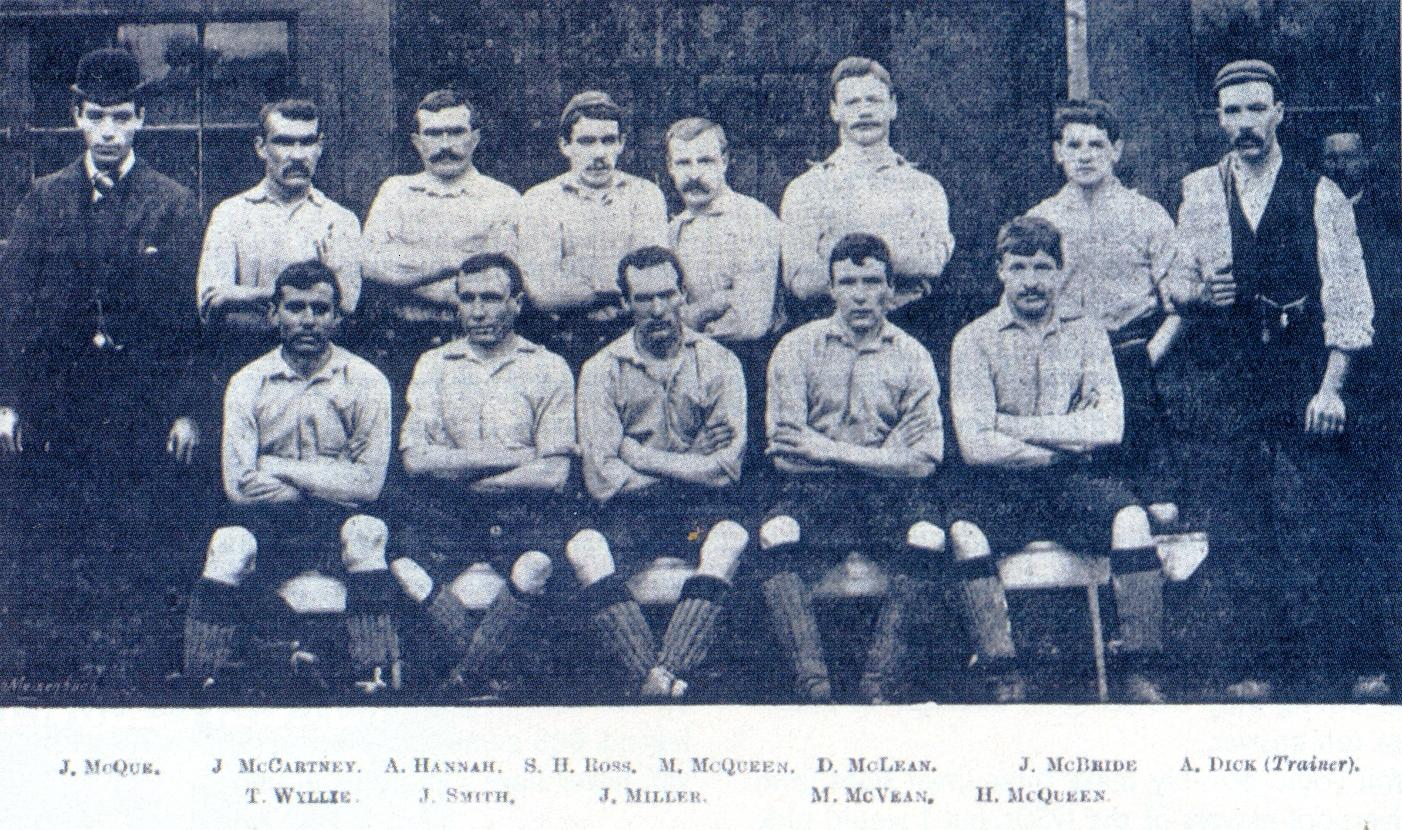
Liverpool's team during its first season, 1892–93

Liverpool Football Club is an English association football club based in Liverpool, Merseyside. The club was formed in 1892 following a disagreement between the board of Everton and club president John Houlding, who owned the club's ground, Anfield. The disagreement between the two parties over rent resulted in Everton moving to Goodison Park from Anfield, which left Houlding with an empty stadium. Thus, he founded Liverpool F.C. to play in the empty stadium. Liverpool won the First Division title for the first time in 1901; since then, the club has won a further nineteen league titles, along with eight FA Cups, ten Football League Cups, and sixteen FA Community Shields. They have also been crowned champions of European football on six occasions, winning the European Cup/UEFA Champions League in 1977, 1978, 1981, 1984, 2005, and 2019, and UEFA Cup winners on three occasions. The club was one of 22 members of the Premier League when it was formed in 1992.

As of the end of the 2025–26 season, the team have spent 111 seasons in the top tier of the English football league system and eleven in the second. The table details the team's achievements and the top goalscorer in senior first-team competitions from their first in the Lancashire League and FA Cup during the 1892–93 season to the end of the most recently completed season. Details of the abandoned 1939–40 season and unofficial Second World War leagues are not included.

== History ==
Liverpool F.C. were formed in 1892, following a rent dispute between the leaseholder of Anfield, John Houlding, and Everton Football Club, which left Houlding with a ground but no club playing in it. In their first season Liverpool won the Lancashire League, and were elected to the Football League Second Division for the 1893–94 season, going on to win the title without losing a match. Their first season in the First Division ended in relegation, before they were promoted back the following season. Liverpool won the First Division for the first time in the 1900–01 season, and reached their first |FA Cup Final in 1914, losing 1–0 to Burnley. They won their first back-to-back titles in the 1921–22 and 1922–23 seasons; this was their last success until the 1946–47 season, when they regained the league title. Relegated in the 1953–54 season, they did not regain their place in the First Division until the 1962–63 season under the management of Bill Shankly.

Liverpool first participated in European competition during the 1964–65 season, a season which represented Liverpool's first FA Cup triumph. They won their first European trophy, the UEFA Cup, during the 1972–73 season. The club won the European Cup during the 1976–77 season and retained the trophy the following year. Liverpool won a unique treble of the League, the European Cup and League Cup during the 1983–84 season. They won their first double of league championship and FA Cup in 1986, and during the 2000–01 season they won another treble, this one consisting of the FA Cup, League Cup and UEFA Cup. Liverpool won their first Premier League title in the 2019–20 season under Jürgen Klopp.

== Key ==
- PL = Premier League
- Division 1 = Football League First Division
- Division 2 = Football League Second Division
- Lancs = Lancashire League
- Pld = Matches played
- W = Matches won
- D = Matches drawn
- L = Matches lost
- GF = Goals for
- GA = Goals against
- Pts = Points
- Pos = Final position
- QR3 = Third qualifying round
- R32 = Round of 32
- R16 = Round of 16
- R1 = Round 1
- R2 = Round 2
- R3 = Round 3
- R4 = Round 4
- R5 = Round 5
- R6 = Round 6
- Grp = Group stage
- QF = Quarter-finals
- SF = Semi-finals

Winners	Runners-up	Promoted ↑	Relegated ↓	Top scorer in Liverpool's division ♦

== Seasons ==
Correct as of the 2025–26 season. (Note: Goal tallies are for the competitions listed only; friendly matches are not included. Divisions are not sorted alphabetically, but based on their placing in the English football league system at that time.) (Note: From 1896–97 until 1980–81, two points were awarded for a win, and one for a draw. From the 1981–82 season onwards, three points have been awarded for a win.)

Seasons of Liverpool F.C.
Season	League									FA Cup	League Cup	Comm. Shield	UCL	UEL	CWC	Super Cup	Club World Cup	Top scorer(s)	
Season	Division	Pld	W	D	L	GF	GA	Pts	Pos	FA Cup	League Cup	Comm. Shield	UCL	UEL	CWC	Super Cup	Club World Cup	Player(s)	Goals
1892–93	Lancs ↑	22	17	2	3	66	19	36	1st	QR3	—	—	—	—	—	—	—	John Miller	25
1893–94	Division 2 ↑	28	22	6	0	77	18	50	1st (Note: Liverpool were promoted after defeating Newton Heath 2–0 in a test match. Promotion and relegation were decided by test match until the 1898–99 season.)	R3	—	—	—	—	—	—	—	James Stott	14
1894–95	Division 1 ↓	30	7	8	15	51	70	22	16th (Note: Liverpool were relegated after losing 1–0 to Blackburn Rovers in a test match.)	R2	—	—	—	—	—	—	—	Harry Bradshaw	18
1895–96	Division 2 ↑	30	22	2	6	106	32	46	1st (Note: Liverpool were promoted after winning two and drawing one of four test matches, which were played at home and away against Small Heath and West Bromwich Albion.)	R2	—	—	—	—	—	—	—	George Allan	29
1896–97	Division 1	30	12	9	9	46	38	33	5th	SF	—	—	—	—	—	—	—	George Allan	18
1897–98	Division 1	30	11	6	13	48	45	28	9th	R3	—	—	—	—	—	—	—	Frank Becton	13
1898–99	Division 1	34	19	5	10	49	33	43	2nd	SF	—	—	—	—	—	—	—	Hugh Morgan	13
1899–1900	Division 1	34	14	5	15	49	45	33	10th	R2	—	—	—	—	—	—	—	Tom Robertson John Walker	10
1900–01	Division 1	34	19	7	8	59	35	45	1st	R1	—	—	—	—	—	—	—	Sam Raybould	18
1901–02	Division 1	34	10	12	12	42	38	32	11th	R2	—	—	—	—	—	—	—	Sam Raybould	18
1902–03	Division 1	34	17	4	13	68	49	38	5th	R1	—	—	—	—	—	—	—	Sam Raybould (Note: 31 goals in First Division.)	32 ♦
1903–04	Division 1 ↓	34	9	8	17	49	62	26	17th	R1	—	—	—	—	—	—	—	Jack Cox	9
1904–05	Division 2 ↑	34	27	4	3	93	25	58	1st	R1	—	—	—	—	—	—	—	Robbie Robinson	23
1905–06	Division 1	38	23	5	10	79	46	51	1st	SF	—	—	—	—	—	—	—	Joe Hewitt	27
1906–07	Division 1	38	13	7	18	64	65	33	15th	R4	—	—	—	—	—	—	—	Sam Raybould	17
1907–08	Division 1	38	16	6	16	68	61	38	8th	R3	—	—	—	—	—	—	—	Joe Hewitt	22
1908–09	Division 1	38	15	6	17	57	65	36	16th	R2	—	—	—	—	—	—	—	Ronald Orr	23
1909–10	Division 1	38	21	6	11	78	57	48	2nd	R1	—	—	—	—	—	—	—	Jack Parkinson (Note: 30 goals in First Division.)	30 ♦
1910–11	Division 1	38	15	7	16	53	53	37	13th	R2	—	—	—	—	—	—	—	Jack Parkinson	20
1911–12	Division 1	38	12	10	16	49	55	34	17th	R2	—	—	—	—	—	—	—	Jack Parkinson	13
1912–13	Division 1	38	16	5	17	61	71	37	12th	R3	—	—	—	—	—	—	—	Arthur Metcalf	18
1913–14	Division 1	38	14	7	17	46	62	35	16th	RU	—	—	—	—	—	—	—	Tom Miller	20
1914–15	Division 1	38	14	9	15	65	75	37	13th	R2	—	—	—	—	—	—	—	Fred Pagnam	26
1915–19	Peacetime competitions were suspended during the First World War. Liverpool competed in the Lancashire Section pr. from 1915–16 to 1918–19.																		
1919–20	Division 1	42	19	10	13	59	44	48	4th	R4	—	—	—	—	—	—	—	Harry Chambers	15
1920–21	Division 1	42	18	15	9	63	35	51	4th	R2	—	—	—	—	—	—	—	Harry Chambers	24
1921–22	Division 1	42	22	13	7	63	36	57	1st	R2	—	—	—	—	—	—	—	Harry Chambers	21
1922–23	Division 1	42	26	8	8	70	31	60	1st	R3	—	RU	—	—	—	—	—	Harry Chambers	25
1923–24	Division 1	42	15	11	16	49	48	41	12th	R4	—	—	—	—	—	—	—	Jimmy Walsh	19
1924–25	Division 1	42	20	10	12	63	55	50	4th	R4	—	—	—	—	—	—	—	Dick Forshaw	19
1925–26	Division 1	42	14	16	12	70	63	44	7th	R4	—	—	—	—	—	—	—	Dick Forshaw	29
1926–27	Division 1	42	18	7	17	69	61	43	9th	R5	—	—	—	—	—	—	—	Harry Chambers	21
1927–28	Division 1	42	13	13	16	84	87	39	16th	R4	—	—	—	—	—	—	—	Gordon Hodgson	23
1928–29	Division 1	42	17	12	13	90	64	46	5th	R4	—	—	—	—	—	—	—	Gordon Hodgson	32
1929–30	Division 1	42	16	9	17	63	79	41	12th	R3	—	—	—	—	—	—	—	Jimmy Smith	23
1930–31	Division 1	42	15	12	15	86	85	42	9th	R3	—	—	—	—	—	—	—	Gordon Hodgson	36
1931–32	Division 1	42	19	6	17	81	93	44	10th	R6	—	—	—	—	—	—	—	Gordon Hodgson	27
1932–33	Division 1	42	14	11	17	79	84	39	14th	R3	—	—	—	—	—	—	—	Gordon Hodgson	24
1933–34	Division 1	42	14	10	18	79	87	38	18th	R5	—	—	—	—	—	—	—	Gordon Hodgson	25
1934–35	Division 1	42	19	7	16	85	88	45	7th	R4	—	—	—	—	—	—	—	Gordon Hodgson	29
1935–36	Division 1	42	13	12	17	60	64	38	19th	R3	—	—	—	—	—	—	—	Fred Howe	17
1936–37	Division 1	42	12	11	19	62	84	35	18th	R3	—	—	—	—	—	—	—	Fred Howe	16
1937–38	Division 1	42	15	11	16	65	71	41	11th	R5	—	—	—	—	—	—	—	Alf Hanson	15
1938–39	Division 1	42	14	14	14	62	63	42	11th	R5	—	—	—	—	—	—	—	Berry Nieuwenhuys	16
1939–45	Peacetime competitions were suspended during the Second World War. Liverpool participated in wartime leagues until 1945–46.																		
1945–46	—	—	—	—	—	—	—	—	—	R4	—	—	—	—	—	—	—	Willie Fagan	3
1946–47	Division 1	42	25	7	10	84	52	57	1st	SF	—	—	—	—	—	—	—	Jack Balmer; Albert Stubbins	28
1947–48	Division 1	42	16	10	16	65	61	42	11th	R5	—	—	—	—	—	—	—	Albert Stubbins	26
1948–49	Division 1	42	13	14	15	53	43	40	12th	R5	—	—	—	—	—	—	—	Jack Balmer	16
1949–50	Division 1	42	17	14	11	64	54	48	8th	RU	—	—	—	—	—	—	—	Billy Liddell	19
1950–51	Division 1	42	16	11	15	53	59	43	9th	R3	—	—	—	—	—	—	—	Billy Liddell	15
1951–52	Division 1	42	12	19	11	57	61	43	11th	R5	—	—	—	—	—	—	—	Billy Liddell	19
1952–53	Division 1	42	14	8	20	61	82	36	17th	R3	—	—	—	—	—	—	—	Billy Liddell	13
1953–54	Division 1 ↓	42	9	10	23	68	97	28	22nd	R3	—	—	—	—	—	—	—	Sammy Smyth	13
1954–55	Division 2	42	16	10	16	92	96	42	11th	R5	—	—	—	—	—	—	—	John Evans	33
1955–56	Division 2	42	21	6	15	85	63	48	3rd	R5	—	—	—	—	—	—	—	Billy Liddell	32
1956–57	Division 2	42	21	11	10	82	54	53	3rd	R3	—	—	—	—	—	—	—	Billy Liddell	21
1957–58	Division 2	42	22	10	10	79	54	54	4th	R6	—	—	—	—	—	—	—	Billy Liddell	23
1958–59	Division 2	42	24	5	13	87	62	53	4th	R3	—	—	—	—	—	—	—	Jimmy Melia	21
1959–60	Division 2	42	20	10	12	90	66	50	3rd	R4	—	—	—	—	—	—	—	Roger Hunt	23
1960–61	Division 2	42	21	10	11	87	58	52	3rd	R4	R3	—	—	—	—	—	—	Kevin Lewis	32
1961–62	Division 2 ↑	42	27	8	7	99	43	62	1st	R5	—	—	—	—	—	—	—	Roger Hunt	42
1962–63	Division 1	42	17	10	15	71	59	44	8th	SF	—	—	—	—	—	—	—	Roger Hunt	26
1963–64	Division 1	42	26	5	11	92	45	57	1st	R6	—	—	—	—	—	—	—	Roger Hunt	33
1964–65	Division 1	42	17	10	15	67	73	44	7th	W	—	W (Note: From 1939 to 1993, in the event of a draw, the Charity Shield would be shared between the two competing teams, with each team having possession of the trophy for six months.)	SF	—	—	—	—	Roger Hunt	37
1965–66	Division 1	42	26	9	7	79	34	61	1st	R3	—	W	—	—	RU	—	—	Roger Hunt (Note: 29 goals in First Division, joint top scorer with Willie Irvine of Burnley.)	33 ♦
1966–67	Division 1	42	19	13	10	64	47	51	5th	R5	—	W	R2	—	—	—	—	Roger Hunt	19
1967–68	Division 1	42	22	11	9	71	40	55	3rd	R6	R2	—	—	R3	—	—	—	Roger Hunt	30
1968–69	Division 1	42	25	11	6	63	24	61	2nd	R5	R4	—	—	R1	—	—	—	Roger Hunt	17
1969–70	Division 1	42	20	11	11	65	42	51	5th	R6	R3	—	—	R2	—	—	—	Bobby Graham	21
1970–71	Division 1	42	17	17	8	42	24	51	5th	RU	R3	—	—	SF	—	—	—	Alun Evans	15
1971–72	Division 1	42	24	9	9	64	30	57	3rd	R4	R4	RU	—	—	R2	—	—	John Toshack	13
1972–73	Division 1	42	25	10	7	72	42	60	1st	R4	R5	—	—	W	—	—	—	Kevin Keegan	22
1973–74	Division 1	42	22	13	7	52	31	57	2nd	W	R5	—	R2	—	—	—	—	Kevin Keegan	19
1974–75	Division 1	42	20	11	11	60	39	51	2nd	R4	R4	W	—	—	R2	—	—	Steve Heighway	13
1975–76	Division 1	42	23	14	5	66	31	60	1st	R4	R3	—	—	W	—	—	—	John Toshack	23
1976–77	Division 1	42	23	11	8	62	33	57	1st	RU	R2	W	W	—	—	—	—	Kevin Keegan	20
1977–78	Division 1	42	24	9	9	65	34	57	2nd	R3	RU	W	W	—	—	W	—	Kenny Dalglish	31
1978–79	Division 1	42	30	8	4	85	16	68	1st	SF	R2	—	R1	—	—	RU	—	Kenny Dalglish	25
1979–80	Division 1	42	25	10	7	81	30	60	1st	SF	SF	W	R1	—	—	—	—	David Johnson	27
1980–81	Division 1	42	17	17	8	62	42	51	5th	R4	W	W	W	—	—	—	—	Terry McDermott	22
1981–82	Division 1	42	26	9	7	80	32	87	1st	R5	W	—	QF	—	—	—	RU	Ian Rush	30
1982–83	Division 1	42	24	10	8	87	37	82	1st	R5	W	W	QF	—	—	—	—	Ian Rush	31
1983–84	Division 1	42	22	14	6	73	32	80	1st	R4	W	RU	W	—	—	—	—	Ian Rush (Note: 32 goals in First Division.)	47 ♦
1984–85	Division 1	42	22	11	9	68	35	77	2nd	SF	R3	RU	RU	—	—	RU	RU	John Wark	27
1985–86	Division 1	42	26	10	6	89	37	88	1st	W	SF	—	—	—	—	—	—	Ian Rush	33
1986–87	Division 1	42	23	8	11	72	42	77	2nd	R3	RU	W	—	—	—	—	—	Ian Rush	40
1987–88	Division 1	40	26	12	2	87	24	90	1st	RU	R3	—	—	—	—	—	—	John Aldridge (Note: 26 goals in First Division.)	29 ♦
1988–89	Division 1	38	22	10	6	65	28	76	2nd	W	R4	W	—	—	—	—	—	John Aldridge	31
1989–90	Division 1	38	23	10	5	78	37	79	1st	SF	R3	W	—	—	—	—	—	John Barnes	28
1990–91	Division 1	38	23	7	8	77	40	76	2nd	R5	R3	W	—	—	—	—	—	Ian Rush	26
1991–92	Division 1	42	16	16	10	47	40	64	6th	W	R4	—	—	QF	—	—	—	Dean Saunders	23
1992–93	PL	42	16	11	15	62	55	59	6th	R3	R4	RU	—	—	R2	—	—	Ian Rush	22
1993–94	PL	42	17	9	16	59	55	60	8th	R3	R4	—	—	—	—	—	—	Ian Rush	19
1994–95	PL	42	21	11	10	65	37	74	4th	R6	W	—	—	—	—	—	—	Robbie Fowler	31
1995–96	PL	38	20	11	7	70	34	71	3rd	RU	R4	—	—	R2	—	—	—	Robbie Fowler	36
1996–97	PL	38	19	11	8	62	37	68	4th	R4	R5	—	—	—	SF	—	—	Robbie Fowler	31
1997–98	PL	38	18	11	9	68	42	65	3rd	R3	SF	—	—	R2	—	—	—	Michael Owen (Note: 18 goals in Premier League, joint top scorer with Chris Sutton of Blackburn Rovers and Dion Dublin of Coventry City.)	23 ♦
1998–99	PL	38	15	9	14	68	49	54	7th	R4	R4	—	—	R3	—	—	—	Michael Owen (Note: 18 goals in Premier League, joint top scorer with Jimmy Floyd Hasselbaink of Leeds United and Dwight Yorke of Manchester United.)	23 ♦
1999–2000	PL	38	19	10	9	51	30	67	4th	R4	R3	—	—	—	—	—	—	Michael Owen	12
2000–01	PL	38	20	9	9	71	39	69	3rd	W	W	—	—	W	—	—	—	Michael Owen	24
2001–02	PL	38	24	8	6	67	30	80	2nd	R4	R3	W	QF	—	—	W	—	Michael Owen	29
2002–03	PL	38	18	10	10	61	41	64	5th	R4	W	RU	Grp (Note: Teams finishing third in their group at the first group stage of the Champions League enter the UEFA Cup/Europa League at round three.)	QF	—	—	—	Michael Owen	28
2003–04	PL	38	16	12	10	55	37	60	4th	R5	R4	—	—	R4	—	—	—	Michael Owen	19
2004–05	PL	38	17	7	14	52	41	58	5th	R3	RU	—	W	—	—	—	—	Milan Baroš Luis García Steven Gerrard	13
2005–06	PL	38	25	7	6	57	25	82	3rd	W	R3	—	R16	—	—	W	RU	Steven Gerrard	23
2006–07	PL	38	20	8	10	57	27	68	3rd	R3	R5	W	RU	—	—	—	—	Peter Crouch	18
2007–08	PL	38	21	13	4	67	28	76	4th	R5	R5	—	SF	—	—	—	—	Fernando Torres	33
2008–09	PL	38	25	11	2	77	27	86	2nd	R4	R4	—	QF	—	—	—	—	Steven Gerrard	24
2009–10	PL	38	18	9	11	61	35	63	7th	R3	R4	—	Grp	SF	—	—	—	Fernando Torres	22
2010–11	PL	38	17	7	14	59	44	58	6th	R3	R3	—	—	R16	—	—	—	Dirk Kuyt	15
2011–12	PL	38	14	10	14	47	40	52	8th	RU	W	—	—	—	—	—	—	Luis Suárez	17
2012–13	PL	38	16	13	9	71	43	61	7th	R4	R4	—	—	R32	—	—	—	Luis Suárez	30
2013–14	PL	38	26	6	6	101	50	84	2nd	R5	R3	—	—	—	—	—	—	Luis Suárez (Note: 31 goals in Premier League.)	31 ♦
2014–15	PL	38	18	8	12	52	48	62	6th	SF	SF	—	Grp	R32	—	—	—	Steven Gerrard	13
2015–16	PL	38	16	12	10	63	50	60	8th	R4	RU	—	—	RU	—	—	—	Daniel Sturridge	13
2016–17	PL	38	22	10	6	78	42	76	4th	R4	SF	—	—	—	—	—	—	Philippe Coutinho	14
2017–18	PL	38	21	12	5	84	38	75	4th	R4	R3	—	RU	—	—	—	—	Mohamed Salah (Note: 32 goals in Premier League.)	44 ♦
2018–19	PL	38	30	7	1	89	22	97	2nd	R3	R3	—	W	—	—	—	—	Mohamed Salah (Note: 22 goals in Premier League, joint top scorer with Sadio Mané of Liverpool and Pierre-Emerick Aubameyang of Arsenal.)	27 ♦
2019–20	PL	38	32	3	3	85	33	99	1st	R5	QF	RU	R16	—	—	W	W	Mohamed Salah	23
2020–21	PL	38	20	9	9	68	42	69	3rd	R4	R4	RU	QF	—	—	—	—	Mohamed Salah	31
2021–22	PL	38	28	8	2	94	26	92	2nd	W	W	—	RU	—	—	—	—	Mohamed Salah (Note: 23 goals in Premier League, joint top scorer with Son Heung-min of Tottenham Hotspur.)	31 ♦
2022–23	PL	38	19	10	9	75	47	67	5th	R4	R4	W	R16	—	—	—	—	Mohamed Salah	30
2023–24	PL	38	24	10	4	86	41	82	3rd	QF	W	—	—	QF	—	—	—	Mohamed Salah	25
2024–25	PL	38	25	9	4	86	41	84	1st	R4	RU	—	R16	—	—	—	—	Mohamed Salah (Note: 29 goals in Premier League.)	34 ♦
2025–26	PL	38	17	9	12	63	53	60	5th	QF	R4	RU	QF	—	—	—	—	Hugo Ekitike	17
Season	Division	Pld	W	D	L	GF	GA	Pts	Pos	FA Cup	League Cup	Comm. Shield	CL	EL	CWC	Super Cup	Club World Cup	Player(s)	Goals
