= 1905–06 Liverpool F.C. season =

English football club season

Liverpool F.C
1905–06 season
- Manager: Tom Watson
- Stadium: Anfield
- Football League: 1st
- FA Cup: First round
- Top goalscorer: League: Joe Hewitt (23); All: Joe Hewitt (26)

The 1905–06 Liverpool F.C. season was the 14th season in existence for Liverpool.

== Squad statistics ==
=== Appearances and goals ===
No.	Pos	Nat	Player	Total		Division 1		F.A. Cup		Charity Shield	
No.	Pos	Nat	Player	Apps	Goals	Apps	Goals	Apps	Goals	Apps	Goals
	MF	(England) ENG	Jimmy Bradley	37	0	31	0	5	0	1	0
	FW	(England) ENG	John Carlin	16	6	14	6	2	0	0	0
	DF	(England) ENG	Tom Chorlton	6	1	6	1	0	0	0	0
	MF	(England) ENG	Jack Cox	33	8	28	8	4	0	1	0
	GK	(Scotland) SCO	Ned Doig	8	0	8	0	0	0	0	0
	DF	(Scotland) SCO	Billy Dunlop	37	0	31	0	5	0	1	0
	MF	(Scotland) SCO	George Fleming	4	0	4	0	0	0	0	0
	MF	(England) ENG	Jimmy Garside	4	0	4	0	0	0	0	0
	MF	(England) ENG	Arthur Goddard	44	10	38	7	5	2	1	1
	MF	(England) ENG	Jimmy Gorman	1	0	1	0	0	0	0	0
	DF	(England) ENG	Harry Griffiths	1	0	1	0	0	0	0	0
	GK	(England) ENG	Sam Hardy	36	0	30	0	5	0	1	0
	FW	(England) ENG	Joe Hewitt	43	26	37	23	5	1	1	2
	DF	(Wales) WAL	George Latham	6	0	5	0	1	0	0	0
	DF	(Scotland) SCO	David Murray	3	0	3	0	0	0	0	0
	FW	(England) ENG	Jack Parkinson	11	7	9	7	1	0	1	0
	MF	(Wales) WAL	Maurice Parry	42	1	36	1	5	0	1	0
	DF	(Scotland) SCO	Alex Raisbeck	41	1	36	1	4	0	1	0
	FW	(England) ENG	Sam Raybould	30	15	25	10	4	4	1	1
	FW	(England) ENG	Robbie Robinson	38	11	34	11	4	0	0	0
	DF	(England) ENG	Alf West	43	4	37	3	5	1	1	0

== Table ==
Pos	Team	Pld	W	D	L	GF	GA	GAv	Pts
1	Liverpool (C)	38	23	5	10	79	46	1.717	51
2	Preston North End	38	17	13	8	54	39	1.385	47
3	The Wednesday	38	18	8	12	63	52	1.212	44
4	Newcastle United	38	18	7	13	74	48	1.542	43
5	Manchester City	38	19	5	14	73	54	1.352	43

Source: World Football
Rules for classification: 1) Points; 2) Goal average; 3) Goals scored
(C) Champions
