= 1904–05 Liverpool F.C. season =

English football club season

Liverpool F.C
1904–05 season
- Manager: Tom Watson
- Stadium: Anfield
- Football League Second Division: 1st
- FA Cup: First round
- Top goalscorer: League: Robbie Robinson (23); All: Robbie Robinson (23)

The 1904–05 Liverpool F.C. season was the 13th season in existence for Liverpool.

== Squad statistics ==
=== Appearances and goals ===
No.	Pos	Nat	Player	Total		Division 2		F.A. Cup	
No.	Pos	Nat	Player	Apps	Goals	Apps	Goals	Apps	Goals
	FW	(England) ENG	John Carlin	5	1	4	1	1	0
	DF	(England) ENG	Tom Chorlton	12	3	12	3	0	0
	MF	(England) ENG	Jack Cox	34	10	32	10	2	0
	GK	(Scotland) SCO	Ned Doig	36	0	34	0	2	0
	DF	(Scotland) SCO	Billy Dunlop	34	1	32	1	2	0
	MF	(Scotland) SCO	George Fleming	31	0	29	0	2	0
	MF	(England) ENG	Jimmy Garside	1	0	1	0	0	0
	MF	(England) ENG	Arthur Goddard	30	8	28	7	2	1
	FW	(England) ENG	Joe Hewitt	9	1	9	1	0	0
	MF	(Wales) WAL	Jack Hughes	4	0	4	0	0	0
	DF	(Wales) WAL	George Latham	1	0	1	0	0	0
	FW	(Wales) WAL	Dickie Morris	7	1	7	1	0	0
	DF	(Scotland) SCO	David Murray	12	0	12	0	0	0
	FW	(England) ENG	Jack Parkinson	23	21	21	20	2	1
	MF	(Wales) WAL	Maurice Parry	32	2	30	2	2	0
	DF	(Scotland) SCO	Alex Raisbeck	35	2	33	2	2	0
	FW	(England) ENG	Sam Raybould	34	20	32	20	2	0
	FW	(England) ENG	Robbie Robinson	33	23	32	23	1	0
	DF	(England) ENG	Alf West	18	1	16	1	2	0
	DF	(England) ENG	Charlie Wilson	5	0	5	0	0	0

== Table ==
Pos	Team	Pld	W	D	L	GF	GA	GAv	Pts	Promotion or relegation
1	Liverpool (C, P)	34	27	4	3	93	25	3.720	58	Promotion to the First Division
2	Bolton Wanderers (P)	34	27	2	5	87	32	2.719	56	Promotion to the First Division
3	Manchester United	34	24	5	5	81	30	2.700	53	
4	Bristol City	34	19	4	11	66	45	1.467	42	
5	Chesterfield Town	34	14	11	9	44	35	1.257	39	

(C) Champions; (P) Promoted
