= 1909–10 Liverpool F.C. season =

English football club season

Liverpool F.C
1909–10 season
- Manager: Tom Watson
- Stadium: Anfield
- Football League: 2nd
- FA Cup: First round
- Top goalscorer: League: Jack Parkinson (30); All: Jack Parkinson (30)

The 1909–10 Liverpool F.C. season was the 18th season in existence for Liverpool.

== Squad statistics ==
=== Appearances and goals ===
No.	Pos	Nat	Player	Total		Division 1		F.A. Cup	
No.	Pos	Nat	Player	Apps	Goals	Apps	Goals	Apps	Goals
	GK	(England) ENG	Augustus Beeby	5	0	5	0	0	0
	MF	(England) ENG	Sam Bowyer	13	6	12	6	1	0
	MF	(England) ENG	Jimmy Bradley	30	0	30	0	0	0
	DF	(England) ENG	Tom Chorlton	39	0	38	0	1	0
	DF	(Scotland) SCO	Bob Crawford	20	0	20	0	0	0
	MF	(England) ENG	Arthur Goddard	36	13	35	13	1	0
	MF	(England) ENG	Bert Goode	1	1	1	1	0	0
	GK	(England) ENG	Sam Hardy	33	0	32	0	1	0
	DF	(England) ENG	Jimmy Harrop	33	1	32	1	1	0
	FW	(England) ENG	Joe Hewitt	4	2	4	2	0	0
	MF	(Scotland) SCO	Jock McConnell	14	0	13	0	1	0
	MF	(Scotland) SCO	John McDonald	35	2	34	2	1	0
	DF	(Scotland) SCO	Donald McKinlay	1	0	1	0	0	0
	FW	(Scotland) SCO	Ronald Orr	31	4	31	4	0	0
	FW	(England) ENG	Jack Parkinson	32	30	31	30	1	0
	DF	(Wales) WAL	Ernie Peake	3	0	3	0	0	0
	FW	(England) ENG	Robbie Robinson	38	1	37	1	1	0
	DF	(England) ENG	Tom Rogers	18	0	17	0	1	0
	DF	(England) ENG	James Speakman	2	0	2	0	0	0
	MF	(Scotland) SCO	Jimmy Stewart	38	18	37	18	1	0
	MF	(England) ENG	Harold Uren	3	0	3	0	0	0

== Table ==
Pos	Team	Pld	W	D	L	GF	GA	GAv	Pts
1	Aston Villa (C)	38	23	7	8	84	42	2.000	53
2	Liverpool	38	21	6	11	78	57	1.368	48
3	Blackburn Rovers	38	18	9	11	73	55	1.327	45
4	Newcastle United	38	19	7	12	70	56	1.250	45
5	Manchester United	38	19	7	12	69	61	1.131	45

Source: World Football
Rules for classification: 1) Points; 2) Goal average; 3) Goals scored
(C) Champions
