= 1903–04 Liverpool F.C. season =

English football club season

Liverpool F.C
1903–04 season
- Manager: Tom Watson 8th season
- Stadium: Anfield
- Football League: 17th
- FA Cup: First round
- Top goalscorer: League: Jack Cox (10); All: Jack Cox (10)

The 1903–04 Liverpool F.C. season was the 12th season in existence for Liverpool.

== Squad statistics ==
=== Appearances and goals ===
No.	Pos	Nat	Player	Total		Division 1		F.A. Cup	
No.	Pos	Nat	Player	Apps	Goals	Apps	Goals	Apps	Goals
	FW	(England) ENG	Fred Buck	13	1	13	1	0	0
	FW	(England) ENG	John Carlin	4	1	4	1	0	0
	MF	(England) ENG	John Chadburn	2	0	2	0	0	0
	FW	(England) ENG	Edgar Chadwick	15	0	14	0	1	0
	GK	(England) ENG	Charlie Cotton	12	0	12	0	0	0
	MF	(England) ENG	Jack Cox	34	10	33	10	1	0
	MF	(Scotland) SCO	Herbert Craik	1	0	1	0	0	0
	DF	(Scotland) SCO	Billy Dunlop	22	1	21	1	1	0
	MF	(Scotland) SCO	George Fleming	18	4	18	4	0	0
	MF	(England) ENG	Arthur Goddard	34	7	33	7	1	0
	FW	(England) ENG	Joe Hewitt	11	1	11	1	0	0
	DF	(England) ENG	Joe Hoare	7	0	7	0	0	0
	MF	(Wales) WAL	Jack Hughes	32	2	31	2	1	0
	DF	(Scotland) SCO	John McLean	4	0	4	0	0	0
	FW	(Wales) WAL	Dickie Morris	18	4	17	4	1	0
	FW	(England) ENG	Jack Parkinson	18	6	18	6	0	0
	MF	(Wales) WAL	Maurice Parry	30	0	29	0	1	0
	GK	(England) ENG	Peter Platt	23	0	22	0	1	0
	DF	(Scotland) SCO	Alex Raisbeck	31	1	30	1	1	0
	FW	(England) ENG	Sam Raybould	16	5	15	4	1	1
	FW	(England) ENG	Robbie Robinson	9	5	9	5	0	0
	FW	(England) ENG	Syd Smith	2	1	2	1	0	0
	DF	(England) ENG	Alf West	25	1	24	1	1	0
	DF	(England) ENG	Charlie Wilson	4	0	4	0	0	0

== Table ==
Pos	Team	Pld	W	D	L	GF	GA	GAv	Pts	Relegation
14	Derby County	34	9	10	15	58	60	0.967	28	
15	Blackburn Rovers	34	11	6	17	48	60	0.800	28	
16	Stoke	34	10	7	17	54	57	0.947	27	
17	Liverpool (R)	34	9	8	17	49	62	0.790	26	Relegation to the Second Division
18	West Bromwich Albion (R)	34	7	10	17	36	60	0.600	24	Relegation to the Second Division

Source: World Football
Rules for classification: 1) Points; 2) Goal average; 3) Goals scored
(R) Relegated
