= 1911–12 Liverpool F.C. season =

English football club season

Liverpool F.C
1911–12 season
- Manager: Tom Watson
- Stadium: Anfield
- Football League: 17th
- FA Cup: Second round
- Top goalscorer: League: Jack Parkinson (12); All: Jack Parkinson (13)

The 1911–12 Liverpool F.C. season was the 20th season in existence for Liverpool.

== Squad statistics ==
=== Appearances and goals ===
No.	Pos	Nat	Player	Total		Division 1		F.A. Cup	
No.	Pos	Nat	Player	Apps	Goals	Apps	Goals	Apps	Goals
	FW	(Scotland) SCO	John Bovill	25	7	23	7	2	0
	MF	(England) ENG	Sam Bowyer	2	0	2	0	0	0
	GK	(Scotland) SCO	Kenny Campbell	7	0	7	0	0	0
	DF	(Scotland) SCO	Bob Crawford	15	0	15	0	0	0
	FW	(Scotland) SCO	Sammy Gilligan	23	11	23	11	0	0
	MF	(England) ENG	Arthur Goddard	29	2	28	2	1	0
	FW	(Scotland) SCO	Tommy Gracie	6	1	6	1	0	0
	GK	(England) ENG	Sam Hardy	33	0	31	0	2	0
	DF	(England) ENG	Jimmy Harrop	31	1	29	1	2	0
	MF	(Ireland) EIR	Billy Lacey	11	1	11	1	0	0
	DF	(United States) USA	Hugh Lester	1	0	1	0	0	0
	DF	(England) ENG	Ephraim Longworth	39	0	37	0	2	0
	MF	(England) ENG	Harry Lowe	30	1	28	1	2	0
	MF	(Scotland) SCO	Jock McConnell	8	1	8	1	0	0
	MF	(Scotland) SCO	John McDonald	20	1	19	1	1	0
	DF	(Scotland) SCO	Donald McKinlay	7	0	7	0	0	0
	FW	(Scotland) SCO	Tom Miller	8	1	8	1	0	0
	FW	(Scotland) SCO	Ronald Orr	7	1	7	1	0	0
	FW	(England) ENG	Jack Parkinson	27	13	25	12	2	1
	DF	(Wales) WAL	Ernie Peake	8	0	8	0	0	0
	DF	(Scotland) SCO	Bob Pursell	26	0	24	0	2	0
	FW	(England) ENG	Robbie Robinson	33	2	31	2	2	0
	MF	(Scotland) SCO	James Scott	4	0	4	0	0	0
	DF	(England) ENG	James Speakman	3	1	3	1	0	0
	MF	(Scotland) SCO	Jimmy Stewart	6	3	6	3	0	0
	FW	(England) ENG	William Stuart	5	1	3	1	2	0
	MF	(England) ENG	Harold Uren	26	2	24	2	2	0

== Table ==
Pos	Team	Pld	W	D	L	GF	GA	GAv	Pts	Relegation
15	Manchester City	38	13	9	16	56	58	0.966	35	
16	Notts County	38	14	7	17	46	63	0.730	35	
17	Liverpool	38	12	10	16	49	55	0.891	34	
18	Oldham Athletic	38	12	10	16	46	54	0.852	34	
19	Preston North End (R)	38	13	7	18	40	57	0.702	33	Relegation to the Second Division

Source: World Football
Rules for classification: 1) Points; 2) Goal average; 3) Goals scored
(R) Relegated
