= 1906 Sheriff of London Charity Shield =

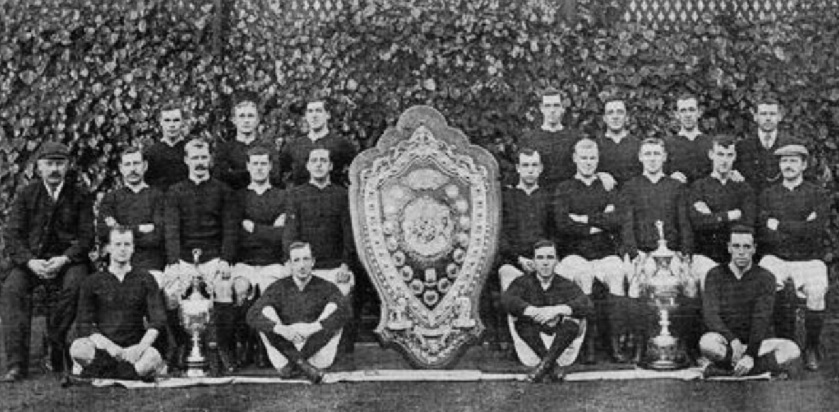
- Liverpool F.C. team photo, showing the Sheriff of London Charity Shield trophy
- Event: Sheriff of London Charity Shield
Liverpool	Corinthian
5	1
- Date: 28 April 1906
- Venue: Craven Cottage, London
- Referee: P R Harrower
- Attendance: 22,000

The 1906 Sheriff of London Charity Shield was the ninth Sheriff of London Charity Shield, contested for the first time by Liverpool F.C. and the 8th time by Corinthian. The match was eagerly anticipated due to Corinthian having only lost a single match in the season and Liverpool being widely regarded as among the best teams in the country.

== Build-up ==
Before the game, both sides were understood to be eager to secure the trophy, with the Corinthians being particularly anxious to possess it after having had to surrender it the year before to Sheffield Wednesday. Liverpool were described by The Morning Post as being "the most consistent professional side of the year", while the Corinthians were described by the Evening Mail as having "one of their greatest years" and by The Sportsman as having had "an exceptional season". Fulham F.C. had generously permitted use of their ground and changed the date of their final league match to accommodate it.

== Match ==
Each side was at full strength for the game, with perfect weather conditions despite strong winds. Liverpool won the coin toss, with G. S. Harris starting the game aggressively for Corinthians. Corinthians started the game facing the wind and began "in brilliant style", repeatedly getting forward and through on goal, only to be beaten "by the sterling defense of the Liverpool backs". The amateurs had the upper hand in the early parts of the game, with a combined movement by their forward players resulting in a shot by S. G. Harris, which Liverpool keeper Sam Hardy was fortunate to save. G.S Harris was a prominent attacking threat for Corinthians, although was poorly supported by the inside man. During the first half, the wind was blowing strongly, which worked in Liverpool's favour as it allowed them to "keep up a strong pressure". Following the Liverpool goalkeeper needing to save "three ugly shots", Liverpool pressed heavily and scored the first goal of the game by Hewitt, which was described by the Staffordshire Sentinel as a "brilliant goal". Both keepers had many shots to save during the 1st half. Liverpool led 2-0 at half-time with goals from Hewitt and Raybould.

The display from Corinthian was regarded as disappointing, only looking dangerous when the game was near concluded. Liverpool's performance in the 2nd half was described as "superb", adding a further 3 goals to the single one scored by S. S. Harris for Corinthian.

== Post match ==
The game was described by the Liverpool Echo as being "very stubbornly contested and very fast". It was difficult to pick out any individual performances, as according to the Globe newspaper, "the defence was perfect, the forwards worked with ease and precision, while the halves, especially Raisbeck, were much too good for the Corinthian forwards". Rev W. Blackburn of Corithian was considered to be "quite out of form" by one match reporter, suggesting his uncertainty affected the whole defence and was directly at fault for Liverpool's third goal. Blackburn, described as being "usually a very fine player", failed to check Liverpool's attack and continually balked at goalkeeper Rowlandson. Despite that, the Corinthian half-backs worked hard, despite their forwards getting "no luck".

The game would be the only time Liverpool contested the Sheriff of London Charity Shield in what would be the penultimate contest in the competition. Arthur Kinnaird, 11th Lord Kinnaird presented the shield and medals to the victors. A gate receipt revenue of £776 was also a new record for the competition. Earnings from the game allowed for a donation of $4000 from the promoters to charitable causes. Corinthians captain Morgan Morgan-Owen expressed the opinion that Liverpool's display was "one of the finest" he had witnessed.

Following the match, each team was invited by Lord Kinnaird to dine with him at the Carleton Hotel.

=== Details ===
28 April 1906
15:30

Liverpool	5–1	Corinthian
Hewitt 23', 55', 70'; Raybould 26'; Hunt 75' (o.g.)		S. Harris 87'

Craven Cottage, London
Attendance: 22,000
Referee: P R Harrower

Liverpool
GK	(England) Sam Hardy
FB	(England) Alf West
FB	(Scotland) Billy Dunlop
HB	(Wales) Maurice Parry
HB	(Scotland) Alex Raisbeck (c)
HB	(England) James Bradley
FW	(England) Arthur Goddard
FW	(England) Jack Parkinson
FW	(England) Joe Hewitt
FW	(England) Sam Raybould
FW	(England) Jack Cox
Substitutes:
DF	(England) Tom Chorlton
FW	(England) John Carlin
Manager:
Tom Watson

Corinthian
GK	(England) Tom Rowlandson
FB	(England) W.U. Timmis
FB	Rev. W. Blackburn
HB	J. D. Craig
HB	(Wales) Morgan Morgan-Owen (c)
HB	(England) Kenneth Hunt
FW	(England) Gilbert Vassall
FW	S. H. Day
FW	(England) G. S. Harris
FW	(England) Stanley Harris
FW	(England) Gordan Wright
Manager:
