= 1901–02 Liverpool F.C. season =

English football club season

Liverpool F.C
1901–02 season
- Manager: Tom Watson
- Stadium: Anfield
- Football League: 11th
- FA Cup: Second round
- Top goalscorer: League: Sam Raybould (16); All: Sam Raybould (16)

The 1901–02 Liverpool F.C. season was the 10th season in existence and the 9th in the Football League for Liverpool, since their creation in 1892.

== Squad statistics ==
=== Appearances and goals ===
No.	Pos	Nat	Player	Total		Division 1		F.A. Cup	
No.	Pos	Nat	Player	Apps	Goals	Apps	Goals	Apps	Goals
	MF	(England) ENG	George Bowen	2	0	2	0	0	0
	MF	(England) ENG	Jack Cox	34	4	31	4	3	0
	FW	(England) ENG	Jack Davies	7	0	6	0	1	0
	DF	(Scotland) SCO	Billy Dunlop	36	0	33	0	3	0
	MF	(Scotland) SCO	George Fleming	26	2	24	1	2	1
	DF	(England) ENG	John Glover	18	0	18	0	0	0
	MF	(England) ENG	Arthur Goddard	11	2	11	2	0	0
	DF	(Scotland) SCO	Billy Goldie	37	0	34	0	3	0
	MF	(England) ENG	Tommy Green	4	0	4	0	0	0
	DF	(Scotland) SCO	Thomas Hunter	2	0	2	0	0	0
	FW	(Scotland) SCO	John Hunter	12	3	9	1	3	2
	GK	(England) ENG	Bill Marshall	1	0	1	0	0	0
	FW	(Scotland) SCO	Andy McGuigan	21	9	18	9	3	0
	FW	(Wales) WAL	Dickie Morris	3	0	3	0	0	0
	MF	(Wales) WAL	Maurice Parry	13	0	13	0	0	0
	GK	(England) ENG	Bill Perkins	36	0	33	0	3	0
	DF	(Scotland) SCO	Alex Raisbeck	29	1	26	0	3	1
	FW	(England) ENG	Sam Raybould	29	16	29	16	0	0
	DF	(Scotland) SCO	Jack Robertson	20	1	17	1	3	0
	MF	(Scotland) SCO	Tommy Robertson	25	5	22	4	3	1
	FW	(England) ENG	Charlie Satterthwaite	6	2	6	2	0	0
	FW	(Scotland) SCO	John Walker	18	1	18	1	0	0
	FW	(Scotland) SCO	Billy White	6	1	6	1	0	0
	DF	(England) ENG	Charlie Wilson	11	0	8	0	3	0

== Table ==
Pos	Team	Pld	W	D	L	GF	GA	GAv	Pts
9	The Wednesday	34	13	8	13	48	52	0.923	34
10	Sheffield United	34	13	7	14	53	48	1.104	33
11	Liverpool	34	10	12	12	42	38	1.105	32
12	Bolton Wanderers	34	12	8	14	51	56	0.911	32
13	Notts County	34	14	4	16	51	57	0.895	32

Source: World Football
Rules for classification: 1) Points; 2) Goal average; 3) Goals scored

== Competitions ==
=== League Division 1 ===
2 September 1901 1	Birmingham City	0–0	Liverpool	Birmingham
17:30		Report		Stadium: Muntz Street; Attendance: 10,000

7 September 1901 2	Stoke City	1–0	Liverpool	Stoke-on-Trent
15:30	Higginson 71'	Report		Stadium: Victoria Ground; Attendance: 10,000

14 September 1901 3	Liverpool	2–2	Everton	Liverpool
15:30	White 2'; Raybould 48'	Report	Sharp 8'; Settle 42'	Stadium: Anfield; Attendance: 30,000; Referee: J. Lewis

21 September 1901 4	Sunderland	1–1	Liverpool	Sunderland
15:30	Jackson 30'	Report	Cox 12'	Stadium: Roker Park; Attendance: 15,818; Referee: A. Green

28 September 1901 5	Liverpool	3–1	Birmingham City	Liverpool
15:30	Raybould 18', 60'; Robertson 25' (pen.)	Report	McMillan 13'	Stadium: Anfield; Attendance: 20,000; Referee: Barker AJ

5 October 1901 6	Derby County	1–1	Liverpool	Derby
15:30	Davis 25'	Report	Robertson 85'	Stadium: Baseball Ground; Attendance: 8,000

12 October 1901 7	Liverpool	1–2	The Wednesday	Liverpool
15:30	Robertson 10'	Report	Chapman; Wilson	Stadium: Anfield; Attendance: 15,000; Referee: Strawson JH

19 October 1901 8	Notts County	2–2	Liverpool	Nottingham
15:15	Humphreys 16', 55 '	Report	Hunter 8'; Cox 61'	Stadium: Trent Bridge; Attendance: 10,000; Referee: Whittaker N

26 October 1901 9	Liverpool	1–1	Bolton Wanderers	Liverpool
15:15	McGuigan 53'	Report	Barlow 30'	Stadium: Anfield; Attendance: 16,000

2 November 1901 10	Manchester City	2–3	Liverpool	Manchester
15:00	Gillespie 20'; Williams 75'	Report	Robertson 35'; Satterthwaite 41'; Cox 77 '	Stadium: Hyde Road; Attendance: 20,000

9 November 1901 11	Liverpool	4–1	Wolverhampton Wanderers	Liverpool
15:00	Satterthwaite 2'; Robertson 46' (pen.); McGuigan ?', 81'	Report	Guelliam 35'	Stadium: Anfield; Attendance: 16,000

23 November 1901 12	Newcastle United	1–0	Liverpool	Newcastle upon Tyne
14:30	McColl	Report		Stadium: St James' Park; Attendance: 18,000; Referee: Bye F

30 November 1901 13	Liverpool	1–0	Aston Villa	Liverpool
14:30	Raybould 76'	Report		Stadium: Anfield; Attendance: 18,000

7 December 1901 14	Sheffield United	2–1	Liverpool	Sheffield
14:30	Common 3'; Bennett 85 '	Report	Raybould 52 '	Stadium: Bramall Lane; Attendance: 13,276; Referee: Barker AJ

14 December 1901 15	Liverpool	0–2	Nottingham Forest	Liverpool
14:30		Report	Capes 34'; Calvey 40'	Stadium: Anfield; Attendance: 12,000; Referee: Kirkham FT

26 December 1901 16	Liverpool	0–1	Sunderland	Liverpool
14:30		Report	McLatchie 87'	Stadium: Anfield; Attendance: 20,000; Referee: Green A

28 December 1901 17	Liverpool	1–0	Blackburn Rovers	Liverpool
14:30	McGuigan 7'	Report		Stadium: Anfield; Attendance: 12,000; Referee: Stott J

4 January 1902 18	Liverpool	7–0	Stoke City	Liverpool
14:30	McGuigan 8', 15', ?', ?', ?'; Raybould 12', 55'	Report		Stadium: Anfield; Attendance: 10,000; Referee: Sutcliffe AF

11 January 1902 19	Everton	4–0	Liverpool	Liverpool
14:30	Bell 10'; Young 15'; Settle 88', 88'	Report		Stadium: Goodison Park; Attendance: 25,000; Referee: Lewis J

1 February 1902 20	Bury	0–0	Liverpool	Bury
15:00		Report		Stadium: Gigg Lane; Attendance: 7,000; Referee: Helme T

15 February 1902 21	Liverpool	0–1	Notts County	Liverpool
15:15		Report	Ross 30'	Stadium: Anfield; Attendance: 10,000; Referee: Whittaker N

22 February 1902 22	Bolton Wanderers	1–0	Liverpool	Bolton
15:15	McKie 65'	Report		Stadium: Burnden Park; Attendance: 10,000; Referee: Campbell TP

1 March 1902 23	Liverpool	4–0	Manchester City	Liverpool
15:30	Raybould ?', ?', ?'; Cox 58'	Report	Hosie (penalty missed)	Stadium: Anfield; Attendance: 20,000; Referee: Kirkham FT

8 March 1902 24	Wolverhampton Wanderers	3–1	Liverpool	Wolverhampton
15:30	Wooldridge 7'; Miller 35'; Preston 40'	Report	Raybould 59'	Stadium: Molineux Stadium; Attendance: 6,000; Referee: Barker AJ

15 March 1902 25	Grimsby Town	1–1	Liverpool	Cleethorpes
15:30	Gardner 56'	Report	Goddard 35'	Stadium: Blundell Park; Attendance: 6,000

22 March 1902 26	Liverpool	0–1	Newcastle United	Liverpool
15:30		Report	Orr 3'	Stadium: Anfield; Attendance: 12,000; Referee: Bye F

29 March 1902 27	Aston Villa	0–1	Liverpool	Aston
15:30		Report	Fleming 88'	Stadium: Villa Park; Attendance: 20,000; Referee: Bye F

1 April 1902 28	The Wednesday	1–1	Liverpool	Sheffield
15:30	Wilson 38'	Report	Raybould 35'	Stadium: Owlerton; Attendance: 15,000; Referee: Strawson JH

5 April 1902 29	Liverpool	1–0	Sheffield United	Liverpool
15:30	Raybould ?'	Report		Stadium: Anfield; Attendance: 5,000

12 April 1902 30	Nottingham Forest	1–1	Liverpool	Nottingham
15:30	Calvey 25'	Report	Goddard 49'	Stadium: City Ground; Attendance: 5,000; Referee: Kirkham FT

14 April 1902 31	Liverpool	0–2	Derby County	Liverpool
17:30		Report	Wombwell 75'; Middleton 88'	Stadium: Anfield; Attendance: 12,000

19 April 1902 32	Liverpool	1–0	Bury	Liverpool
15:30	Raybould 5'	Report		Stadium: Anfield; Attendance: 12,000; Referee: Sutcliffe AF

21 April 1902 33	Liverpool	2–2	Grimsby Town	Liverpool
17:30	Raybould ?', ?' (pen.)	Report	Long 45'; Gray 65'	Stadium: Anfield; Attendance: 12,000

26 April 1902 34	Blackburn Rovers	1–1	Liverpool	Blackburn
15:30	Whittaker 15'	Report	Raybould (penalty missed); Walker 75'	Stadium: Ewood Park; Attendance: 2,000; Referee: Stott J

=== F.A. Cup ===
25 January 1902 1	Liverpool	2–2	Everton	Liverpool
	Robertson 45'; Hunter 60'	Report	Young 49'; Sharp 75'	Stadium: Anfield

30 January 1902 1	Everton	0–2	Liverpool	Liverpool
		Report	Balmer 40' (o.g.); Hunter 53'	Stadium: Goodison Park

8 February 1902 2	Southampton	4–1	Liverpool	Southampton
	Turner ?'; Chadwick 14', 80'; Lee 25'	Report	Fleming 81'	Stadium: The Dell

=== Lancashire Senior Cup ===
30 September 1901	Liverpool	2–0	Preston North End	Liverpool
	McGuigan; Raybould	Report		Stadium: Anfield; Attendance: 1,500

21 October 1901	Blackburn Rovers	2–0	Liverpool	Blackburn
	Goal	Report		Stadium: Ewood Park; Attendance: 3,000
