= Henry Preston =

Henry Preston may refer to:

- Henry Preston (cricketer) (1883–1964), English cricketer
- Sir Henry Preston, 3rd Baronet (1851–1897), English soldier, magistrate and footballer
- Henry Preston (antiquary) (1852-1940), geologist, archaeologist and numismatist, founder of Grantham Museum
- Henry Preston (MP for Nottingham), 1414–1417, MP for Nottingham
- Henry Preston (died 1434), MP for City of York
- Henry Preston (footballer), played for Wolverhampton Wanderers between 1901-1905, see 1901–02 Liverpool F.C. season

== See also ==
- Harry Preston (disambiguation)
