= Harry Preston =

Harry Preston may refer to:

- Harry Preston (writer) (1923–2009), author and screenwriter
- Harry Preston (field hockey) (1931–2004), Canadian field hockey player

== See also ==
- Henry Preston (disambiguation)
