= David Murray (footballer, born 1882) =

Scottish footballer (1882–1915)

Personal information
- Full name: David Bruce Murray
- Date of birth: 4 December 1882
- Place of birth: Cathcart, Scotland
- Date of death: 10 December 1915 (aged 33)
- Place of death: Loos-en-Gohelle, France
- Height: 5 ft 9 in (1.75 m)
- Position: Full-back

Senior career*
Years	Team	Apps	(Gls)
1902–1903	Rangers	0	(0)
1903–1904	Everton	2	(0)
1904–1905	Liverpool	15	(0)
1905–1909	Leeds City	83	(6)
1909–1910	Mexborough Town		
1910–1911	Burslem Port Vale	0	(0)
1911–1913	Mexborough Town		
1913–1915	Frickley Colliery		
- * Club domestic league appearances and goals

David Bruce Murray (4 December 1882 – 10 December 1915) was a Scottish professional footballer who played as a full-back in the Football League for Leeds City, Liverpool and Everton. He also played non-League football for Mexborough Town and Frickley Colliery. He played for Liverpool as the club won successive Second Division and First Division titles in 1904–05 and 1905–06. He went on to serve in the Army during World War I and was killed in the Battle of Loos.

== Career ==
Murray began his career in Scotland before joining Everton for the 1903–04 season, making two First Division appearances. He then switched clubs to Liverpool and made 12 appearances for the "Reds" in the 1904–05 season to help the club to win promotion as champions of the Second Division. He played just three games in the 1905–06 season as Liverpool won the First Division title. He joined Leeds City for a £130 fee in December 1905, with the Liverpool Daily Post predicting that he "should be a capital acquisition to Leeds". He scored two goals in 25 games in the second half of the 1905–06 season, and was named as captain for the 1906–07 campaign. After the death of Leeds player Soldier Wilson during a match against Burnley in October 1906, he served as a pallbearer carrying Wilson's coffin to Leeds Station. He scored three goals in 36 appearances during the 1907–08 season but lost his first-team place in the 1908–09 season. He went on to play amateur football for Mexborough Town in the Midland League and Frickley Colliery in the Sheffield Association League.

== Personal life ==
Murray worked as a miner in Mexborough. In early September 1914, three weeks after the outbreak of the First World War, he enlisted as a private in the Argyll and Sutherland Highlanders. He took part in the battles of Hill 70 and Loos and was killed during the latter on 10 December 1915. Murray is commemorated on the Loos Memorial.

== Career statistics ==
Appearances and goals by club, season and competition
Club	Season	League			FA Cup		Other		Total	
Club	Season	Division	Apps	Goals	Apps	Goals	Apps	Goals	Apps	Goals
Everton	1903–04	First Division	2	0	0	0	0	0	2	0
Liverpool	1904–05	Second Division	12	0	0	0	0	0	12	0
Liverpool	1905–06	First Division	3	0	0	0	0	0	3	0
Liverpool	Total		15	0	0	0	0	0	15	0
Leeds City	1905–06	Second Division	23	2	2	0	0	0	25	2
Leeds City	1906–07	Second Division	23	2	2	1	0	0	25	3
Leeds City	1907–08	Second Division	34	2	2	1	0	0	36	3
Leeds City	1908–09	Second Division	3	0	0	0	0	0	3	0
Leeds City	Total		83	6	6	2	0	0	89	8

== Honours ==
Liverpool

- Football League Second Division: 1904–05
- Football League First Division: 1905–06
