= Herbert Leavey =

English footballer and manager

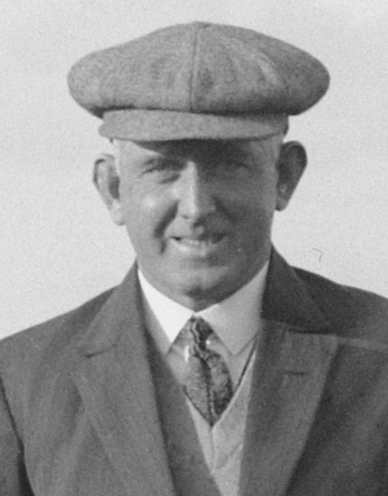

Personal information
- Full name: Herbert James Leavey
- Date of birth: 5 November 1886
- Place of birth: Guildford, England
- Date of death: 1954 (aged 67–68)
- Place of death: Kensington, England
- Position: Forward

Senior career*
Years	Team	Apps	(Gls)
–	Sutton		
–	St Jude's		
1904–1907	Woodland Villa		
1907–1908	Plymouth Argyle	23	(4)
1908	Derby County	0	(0)
1908–1910	Plymouth Argyle	52	(3)
1910–1911	Liverpool	5	(0)
1911–1913	Barnsley	28	(2)
1913–1915	Bradford Park Avenue	19	(1)
1919–1921	Llanelli		
1921	Portsmouth	13	(0)
1921–1922	Boscombe		

Managerial career
- 1922–1926: PSV
- 1926–1928: HRC, SV Gouda
- 1928–1932: SV Gouda
- 1935–1940: HRC
- 1945–1952: HRC
- * Club domestic league appearances and goals

Herbert James "John" Leavey (5 November 1886 – 1954) was an English footballer who made 65 appearances in the Football League for Liverpool, Barnsley, Bradford Park Avenue and Portsmouth. He also played in 75 Southern League and Western League games for Plymouth Argyle. Leavey usually played in the outside forward positions.

After leaving Boscombe in 1922, he worked for Portsmouth as a scout, before moving to the Netherlands to manage PSV Eindhoven between 1922 and 1926. After his appointment as manager, PSV played in the 1e Klasse Zuid (the highest league for teams in South Netherlands) for three seasons. After finishing tenth in 1923 and sixth in 1924, PSV were relegated in Leavy's third season after finishing last. The 1925–26 season in the 2e Klasse B was won, which meant that PSV were promoted back to the 1e Klasse Zuid after one year. Leavy left PSV in 1926 after being four seasons in charge. He subsequently became manager of HRC of Den Helder, although he also started managing SV Gouda on a part-time basis later in the year. He moved to Gouda on a part-time basis in 1927 and led the club to the second tier title in 1931–32. He returned to HRC in 1935, remaining at the club until 1952.

== Personal life ==
Herbert was born in Guildford. He was married to May Pearson and had a son, James Herbert.
