= Herbert Craik =

Scottish footballer (1881–1965)

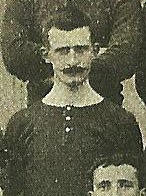
Herbert Craik

Herbert Clement Craik (1 April 1881 – 1 July 1965) was a Scottish footballer, who played once for Liverpool as a left half. He also played for Scottish clubs Morton and Hearts.

Craik was from Forfar, Angus, to William Fyfe Craik, a commercial clerk, and Clementina Duff. As a youth he played with a strong junior team in Glasgow, where he was recruited to join Morton. He joined Liverpool in 1903 for a £10 signing fee and £4 a week wages, in addition to room and board. before returning to Scotland to join Hearts in 1904. He was described by the Liverpool Evening Express as "a most gentlemanly player".

He emigrated to South Africa, where he died in 1965.
