= 1906–07 in English football =

Football in England
- Season: 1906–07

Men's football
- First Division: Newcastle United
- Second Division: Nottingham Forest
- Southern League: Fulham
- FA Cup: The Wednesday
- Charity Shield: Liverpool

The 1906–07 season was the 36th season of competitive football in England.

== Honours ==
Competition	Winner
First Division	Newcastle United
Second Division	Nottingham Forest
FA Cup	The Wednesday
Home Championship	Wales

== League tables ==
=== First Division ===
Pos	Team	Pld	W	D	L	GF	GA	GAv	Pts	Relegation
1	Newcastle United (C)	38	22	7	9	74	46	1.609	51	
2	Bristol City	38	20	8	10	66	47	1.404	48	
3	Everton	38	20	5	13	70	46	1.522	45	
4	Sheffield United	38	17	11	10	57	55	1.036	45	
5	Aston Villa	38	19	6	13	78	52	1.500	44	
6	Bolton Wanderers	38	18	8	12	59	47	1.255	44	
7	Woolwich Arsenal	38	20	4	14	66	59	1.119	44	
8	Manchester United	38	17	8	13	53	56	0.946	42	
9	Birmingham	38	15	8	15	52	52	1.000	38	
10	Sunderland	38	14	9	15	65	66	0.985	37	
11	Middlesbrough	38	15	6	17	56	63	0.889	36	
12	Blackburn Rovers	38	14	7	17	56	59	0.949	35	
13	The Wednesday	38	12	11	15	49	60	0.817	35	
14	Preston North End	38	14	7	17	44	57	0.772	35	
15	Liverpool	38	13	7	18	64	65	0.985	33	
16	Bury	38	13	6	19	58	68	0.853	32	
17	Manchester City	38	10	12	16	53	77	0.688	32	
18	Notts County	38	8	15	15	46	50	0.920	31	
19	Derby County (R)	38	9	9	20	41	59	0.695	27	Relegation to the Second Division
20	Stoke (R)	38	8	10	20	41	64	0.641	26	Relegation to the Second Division

Source: World Football
Rules for classification: 1) Points; 2) Goal average; 3) Goals scored
(C) Champions; (R) Relegated

=== Second Division ===
Pos	Team	Pld	W	D	L	GF	GA	GAv	Pts	Promotion or relegation
1	Nottingham Forest (C, P)	38	28	4	6	74	36	2.056	60	Promotion to the First Division
2	Chelsea (P)	38	26	5	7	80	34	2.353	57	Promotion to the First Division
3	Leicester Fosse	38	20	8	10	62	39	1.590	48	
4	West Bromwich Albion	38	21	5	12	83	45	1.844	47	
5	Bradford City	38	21	5	12	70	53	1.321	47	
6	Wolverhampton Wanderers	38	17	7	14	66	53	1.245	41	
7	Burnley	38	17	6	15	62	47	1.319	40	
8	Barnsley	38	15	8	15	73	55	1.327	38	
9	Hull City	38	15	7	16	65	57	1.140	37	
10	Leeds City	38	13	10	15	55	63	0.873	36	
11	Grimsby Town	38	16	3	19	57	62	0.919	35	
12	Stockport County	38	12	11	15	42	52	0.808	35	
13	Blackpool	38	11	11	16	33	51	0.647	33	
14	Gainsborough Trinity	38	14	5	19	45	72	0.625	33	
15	Glossop	38	13	6	19	53	79	0.671	32	
16	Burslem Port Vale (R)	38	12	7	19	60	83	0.723	31	Resigned from the league
17	Clapton Orient	38	11	8	19	45	67	0.672	30	
18	Chesterfield Town	38	11	7	20	50	66	0.758	29	Re-elected
19	Lincoln City	38	12	4	22	46	73	0.630	28	Re-elected
20	Burton United (R)	38	8	7	23	34	68	0.500	23	Failed re-election and demoted

(C) Champions; (P) Promoted; (R) Relegated
