= Robert Blanthorne =

English footballer (1884–1965)

Bob Blanthorne
Personal information
- Full name: Robert Blanthorne
- Date of birth: 8 January 1884
- Place of birth: Birkenhead, England
- Date of death: 1965 (aged 80–81)
- Place of death: Birkenhead, England
- Position: Centre forward

Youth career
- 1900–1904: Rock Ferry
- 1904–1905: Birkenhead

Senior career*
Years	Team	Apps	(Gls)
1905–1907	Liverpool	2	(1)
1907–1908	Grimsby Town	28	(14)
1908–1911	Newcastle United	1	(0)
1911	Hartlepools United	6	(3)
- * Club domestic league appearances and goals

Robert Blanthorne (8 January 1884 – 1965) was an English footballer who played as a centre forward.

== Career ==
Blanthorne began his career at his local side, Rock Ferry, and was there from 1900 to 1904. He then joined Birkenhead, where he attracted the interest of Liverpool. He was a regular scorer for their reserves scoring 22 goals in the 1905/06 season, and then 17 goals in the following season. He made two first team appearances against Bristol City on 13 April 1907, and Middlesbrough on 17 April 1907, scoring once. Blanthorne was criticised at Anfield because he lacked 'speed and dash'. He was transferred to Grimsby Town the following October.

Blanthorne was involved in a 'giant-killing' in the FA Cup as Grimsby beat Bristol City 2–1 in a first round replay, with the Merseysider getting on the scoresheet. In the second round, Grimsby faced Carlisle United, and beat them 6–2, with Blanthorne netting five of the six goals. After dispatching Crystal Palace in the third round, the Mariners travelled up to Tyneside to face Blanthorne's future employers Newcastle United. However, Grimsby's cup run came to an end at St. James' Park, as they were thrashed 5–1.

Blanthorne turned down the chance to sign for Hull City, before joining Newcastle United in May 1908, for a £350 fee. However, his competitive club debut in the season opener against Bradford City, the following September ended in disaster. Blanthorne was on the ball, and Fred Farren, the opposing left back, rushed in to tackle him. The players had a severe collision, and Blanthorne fell to the ground with a broken leg. This was to be Blanthorne's only appearance for the Magpies.

Returning to fitness and making a comeback for the reserves in January 1910, Blanthorne moved to Hartlepools United and scored on his debut against Carlisle United in January 1911. However, he managed just five more games, and scoring two more times, before retiring due to injury. He later returned to the Birkenhead area, and his death was recorded there during 1965.
