= Harold Fitzpatrick =

English footballer (1880–1942)

Personal information
- Full name: Henry James Fitzpatrick
- Date of birth: 19 December 1880
- Date of death: 6 June 1942 (aged 61)
- Height: 5 ft 8 in (1.73 m)
- Position: Forward

Senior career*
| Years | Team | Apps | (Gls) |
| 1897–1900 | Garston Gas Works Reserves | | |
| 1902–1905 | Gordon Highlanders | | |
| 1906–1907 | Luton Town | 20 | (7) |
| 1907–1908 | Liverpool | 4 | (2) |
| 1908–1909 | Chesterfield | 17 | (1) |
| Total | | 41 | (10) |
Military career
| Allegiance | United Kingdom |
| Service years | 1901–1902; 1914–1918 |
| Unit | Gordon Highlanders |
| Conflicts | World War I |
- * Club domestic league appearances and goals

Henry James Fitzpatrick (19 December 1880 – 6 June 1942), also known as Harry Fitzpatrick was a British footballer who played as a forward. He served with the British Expeditionary Force in World War I.

== Career ==
He played for the Scottish Regiment Gordon Highlanders and was noted as "star forward for the regiment team." He was signed by Luton Town in 1905. His debut for the Hatters was a Southern League away game against Bristol Rovers which Luton won 1–0.

In 1907 Fitzpatrick was brought by Liverpool for a "sizeable fee". In his debut on 12 October 1907 he scored the only game in the game against Sunderland. He was on the score sheet again for Liverpool against Sheffield Wednesday, but he wasn't as prolific in the reverse and fell out of favour. After the season, he transferred to Chesterfield.

He served with the Gordon Highlanders at Mons during World War I where he was captured in 1915. He was a prisoner of war in Germany until early 1918 when he was among thousands of prisoners who were allowed to go to the Netherlands that year, where he stayed until the end of the war. During his stay there he coached Zaanlandsche Voetbal Vereeniging from Zaandam in the second Division of the Old Dutch league until he left by train on 17 November 1918, six days after the surrender of Germany.
