= William Stuart (footballer) =

English footballer

William Stuart (born 1890) was an English footballer who played as a defender. During his career, he played for Bolton Wanderers, Liverpool and Wrexham.
