= Augustus Beeby =

English footballer

Personal information
- Full name: Augustus Richard Beeby
- Date of birth: 24 January 1889
- Place of birth: Ashbourne, England
- Date of death: 1974 (aged 84–85)
- Height: 1.78 m (5 ft 10 in)
- Position: Goalkeeper

Senior career*
| Years | Team | Apps | (Gls) |
| 1906–1908 | Osmaston | | |
| 1908 | Ashbourne Town | | |
| 1908–1911 | Liverpool | 16 | (0) |
| 1911–1912 | Manchester City | 11 | (0) |
| 1912–1913 | Tranmere Rovers | | |
- * Club domestic league appearances and goals

Augustus Richard Beeby (24 January 1889 – 1974), sometimes known as Dick Beeby, was an English professional footballer who played as a goalkeeper in the Football League for Liverpool and Manchester City. (Note: Augustus Beeby at WorldFootball.net)

== Personal life ==
Beeby served as a gunner in the Royal Garrison Artillery during the First World War.

== Career statistics ==
Appearances and goals by club, season and competition
| Club | Season | League | | | FA Cup | | Total | |
| Club | Season | Division | Apps | Goals | Apps | Goals | Apps | Goals |
|---|---|---|---|---|---|---|---|---|
| Liverpool | 1909–10 | First Division | 5 | 0 | 0 | 0 | 5 | 0 |
| Liverpool | 1910–11 | First Division | 11 | 0 | 0 | 0 | 11 | 0 |
| Liverpool | Total | | 16 | 0 | 0 | 0 | 16 | 0 |
| Manchester City | 1911–12 | First Division | 11 | 0 | 0 | 0 | 11 | 0 |
| Career total | | | 27 | 0 | 0 | 0 | 27 | 0 |
