= John Hughes (footballer, born 1877) =

Welsh footballer

Personal information
- Date of birth: 16 April 1877
- Place of birth: Bagillt, Flintshire, Wales
- Date of death: 5 July 1950 (aged 73)

Youth career
- 1897–1900: Liscard C.E.M.S.

Senior career*
Years	Team	Apps	(Gls)
1900–1901	New Brighton Tower		
1901	Clarendon		
1901–1903	Aberdare Athletic		
1903–1906	Liverpool	31	(2)
1906	Plymouth Argyle		

International career
1905	Wales	3	(0)
- * Club domestic league appearances and goals

John Hughes (16 April 1877 – 5 July 1950) was a Welsh international footballer. He was part of the Wales national football team, playing 3 matches. He played his first match on 6 March 1905 against Scotland and his last match on 8 April 1905 against Ireland. At club level, Hughes played for New Brighton Tower, Aberdare Athletic, Liverpool and Plymouth Argyle.

== See also ==
- List of Wales international footballers (alphabetical)
