= Bill McPherson (footballer) =

Scottish footballer (1884–1961)

Personal information
- Full name: William McPherson
- Date of birth: 22 November 1884
- Place of birth: Beith, Scotland
- Date of death: 1961 (aged 76–77)
- Height: 5 ft 8 1/2 in (1.74 m)
- Position: Inside forward

Senior career*
Years	Team	Apps	(Gls)
1903–1904	Beith		
1904–1906	St Mirren	40	(5)
1906–1908	Liverpool	48	(16)
1908–1911	Rangers	51	(24)
1911	→ Beith (loan)		
1911–1913	Heart of Midlothian	34	(7)
Total		173	(52)
- * Club domestic league appearances and goals

William McPherson (22 November 1884 – 1961) was a Scottish footballer who played as an inside forward.

McPherson started his career at St Mirren before joining Liverpool in the English Football League in 1906, scoring 11 goals in 32 appearances in his debut season. He played less frequently the following season in 1907–08 making 22 appearances. The season was to be his last at Liverpool and he would later play for Scottish clubs Rangers and Heart of Midlothian.

He did not win a major trophy with any of his clubs; he joined Liverpool when they were reigning English champions but they did not challenge for honours during his two-year spell. He appeared in the 1909 Scottish Cup Final for Rangers against Celtic, which went to a second replay only for the trophy to be withdrawn after rioting by spectators who believed the two matches had been drawn deliberately to boost revenues. He did claim a winner's medal in the minor Glasgow Merchants Charity Cup a few weeks later. The Gers were Scottish Football League champions in 1910–11 but McPherson did not play for the club at all that season, being loaned to hometown non-league side Beith in February 1911 before moving on to Hearts that summer; the Edinburgh club were third in the league and semi-finalists in the cup in both campaigns he played for them. He then decided to emigrate to New Zealand, sailing in October 1913.

During his time at Liverpool, McPherson played in one Home Scots v Anglo-Scots international trial in 1907 and scored for his side, but he never gained a full cap for Scotland.
