= James Garside =

English footballer

James Arthur Garside (born 24 January 1885, date of death unknown) was an English footballer who played as a striker for Preston North End, Accrington Stanley (two spells), Liverpool (where he made five appearances in the Football League), Exeter City and Horwich RMI. He gained one representative cap with the Southern League XI.
