= George Latham (footballer) =

Welsh footballer and coach (1881–1939)

George Latham MC & Bar
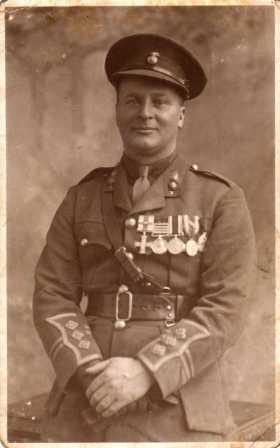

Personal information
- Date of birth: 1 January 1881
- Place of birth: Newtown, Wales
- Date of death: 9 July 1939 (aged 58)
- Place of death: Newtown, Wales
- Position: Half-back

Senior career*
Years	Team	Apps	(Gls)
1897–1900	Newtown		
1901	Docks		
1902	Newtown		
1902	Caledonians		
1902–1909	Liverpool	18	(0)
1909–1910	Southport Central		
1910	Stoke	8	(0)
1911–1914	Cardiff City	11	(1)
1921	Cardiff City	1	(0)

International career
1905–1913	Wales	10	(0)

Managerial career
- 1920: Great Britain
Military career
Allegiance	United Kingdom
Branch	British Army
Rank	Captain
Units	South Wales Borderers; Royal Welch Fusiliers
Conflicts	Second Boer War; World War I; Sinai and Palestine campaign; Battle of Beersheba
Awards	MC & Bar
- * Club domestic league appearances and goals

George Latham MC & Bar (1 January 1881 – 9 July 1939) was a Welsh international footballer and coach. A veteran of the Second Boer War and World War I, he was awarded the Military Cross for his actions in Gaza, Palestine and Turkey between 1917 and 1918. He finished his military career at the rank of captain.

As a player, he played for Newtown, Cardiff City, Liverpool, Stoke and Southport Central, and played 10 times for Wales. He coached Cardiff City during its greatest period of success between 1911 and 1936. The team won the FA Cup in 1927, and only missed out on the League Championship by goal difference. He also coached Great Britain at the 1920 Summer Olympics.

== Early life and military career ==
Latham was born in Newtown, Powys, in 1881. He was the fifth of six boys born to William Latham, a general labourer originally from Shrewsbury, and Esther Latham, a laundress from Birmingham. He attended New Road School as a youngster, playing for the school's football team, before training as a tailor in Market Street. At the age of 16, he joined his hometown side Newtown where he played as an inside forward. In his first season, the side reached the fourth round of the Welsh Cup before suffering defeat to Aberystwyth Town. In 1900, Latham volunteered to serve in South Africa during the Second Boer War as a private in the Fifth South Wales Borderers regiment. The battalion had a unit stationed in Newtown which prompted Latham to enlist. He served 14 months in the division, taking part in action at Brandfort and Potchefstroom among others, in a force led by Earl Roberts, and was eventually promoted to the rank of corporal.

== Playing career ==
Latham began his career as a teenager at his hometown club Newtown in 1897 and spent several years at the club. During his time serving in South Africa, he played for a team named the Docks between the months of May and August, the winter league at the time in the country, finishing as runners-up in the league. He also played in a number of representative matches in the area, including an England vs Scotland match, appearing on the English side, and a Britain vs Colonials match.

Latham returned to his first club Newtown for a short spell in 1902 after returning from military service in South Africa. His form at the time saw him offered a trial with Everton, during which time he was set to be named in a friendly match against West Bromwich Albion but the game was called off due to heavy snowfall in the area. A different friendly match was planned a fortnight later but by then Latham had decided to return to South Africa and he left the country on 22 March 1902. He spent his time there playing for Caledonians, again finishing as runner up in the league and losing the final of the Mayor's Cup to his former side Docks.

On his return to Britain, he joined Liverpool, but was forced to wait three years before he made his debut for the club in an 8–1 victory over Burslem Port Vale on 8 April 1905. He struggled to fully established himself in the team, making just 19 appearances in all competitions during a seven-year spell at the club. After leaving Anfield, Latham had spells with Southport, becoming the first player to win an international cap at the club. He joined Stoke in 1910 and played eight times for the club during the 1910–11 season.

Latham joined Cardiff City as a player-coach in February 1911 under manager Fred Stewart. In his first season, the club won the Welsh Cup by defeating Pontypridd 3–0 in a final replay. After the two sides had drawn the first leg, Bob Lawrie suffered an injury and was ruled out of the replay. Latham took his place for the victory but presented his winner's medal to Lawrie after the game. He appeared sporadically for the side in years preceding the First World War, usually filling in for injuries to the first team. He made 11 league appearances between 1912 and 1914, scoring once in a 6–0 win over Chesham on 1 April 1911.

During his career, Latham won 10 caps for Wales, making his debut on 6 March 1905 in a 3–1 win over Scotland. He was selected for the game after his Liverpool teammate Maurice Parry was recalled by the club to play in a league fixture against Bradford City, allowing Latham to step in. Nine of his ten caps came during his playing career, however his tenth and final cap came when he was forced into action in a 1–0 win over Ireland on 18 January 1913 while serving as a coach for the national team.

== World War I ==
Latham was commissioned into the 7th battalion of the Royal Welch Fusiliers in the First World War and promoted to Lieutenant in 1916. He spent several months training with his regiment at Park Hall Camp near Oswestry before being deployed in June 1916. He was awarded the Military Cross in 1917 and was reportedly originally recommended for the Victoria Cross, the highest military honour for British forces, for his gallantry in capturing enemy positions on the Turkish front while under heavy fire. Having charged and captured an entrenched position with his platoon, he was described as "cleared the cactus gardens and rounded up all the prisoners under heavy fire from snipers, helped Major Pemberton of the Cheshire Regiment, to organise all the men he could get hold of and built up a line of defence". Some of the troops captured were a Turkish general and his staff. The same night, orders were given to retreat from the position, but these never found their way to Latham and another captain who spent the night in position with the area still "seething with Turks". When daylight came the following morning, the pair found themselves alone but were able to make their way back to their lines.

He added a bar in 1918 for his actions fighting in Beersheba (now in Israel) under the command of Edmund Allenby. He was also mentioned in dispatches by General Archibald Murray, commander of the Egyptian Expeditionary Force at the time. He later traveled with his regiment to fight in Palestine.

It was during his service in the First World War that Latham first met his longtime friend Harry Beadles. During their time in Palestine, Latham and Beadles played football for their division, the 7th battalion of the Royal Welch Fusiliers, and won the British Forces in Egypt Football League Cup Final in 1919.

== Coaching career ==
There is no more painstaking football coach

— The County Times, 2 May 1925, describing Latham

After returning to Wales, Latham took up a position as a coach at Cardiff City. He was given a benefit match in 1919, with the Cardiff side playing against local rivals Swansea Town. Latham received the gate receipts, a cheque from the club's directors and a commemorative clock from the players. While serving as a coach, Latham was forced into playing for the side in a 3–1 win over Blackburn Rovers on 2 January 1921 after two of the club's players were taken ill prior to the match, becoming the oldest Football League debutant in the history of the club at 41. To this day he also remains their oldest ever player. Working alongside Fred Stewart, his spell at Ninian Park coincided with one of the most successful spells in the history of the club, including reaching the FA Cup final on two occasions, losing 1–0 to Sheffield United in 1925 before beating Arsenal 1–0 in 1927. During his spell with the club, Latham arranged annual charity matches in his hometown between Cardiff and Newtown to rise money for the Montgomery County Infirmary.

He was let go by the club in 1932 due to financial reasons as they entered a period of decline. He also managed the British team at the 1920 Olympic Games. After leaving Cardiff, Latham worked as a coach at Chester City until his retirement.

== Retirement ==
In 1936, Latham was seriously injured in a bicycle accident and was forced to give up his coaching role. He instead returned to his home town Newtown where he died three years later in July 1939 at Montgomery County Infirmary at the age of 58. His funeral was attended by numerous footballers and his longtime friend Harry Beadles was one of his Pallbearers.

His home town club, Newtown later named their ground Latham Park in honour of him.

== Career statistics ==
=== Club ===
Club	Season	League			FA Cup		Total	
Club	Season	Division	Apps	Goals	Apps	Goals	Apps	Goals
Liverpool	1904–05	Second Division	1	0	0	0	1	0
Liverpool	1905–06	First Division	5	0	1	0	6	0
Liverpool	1906–07	First Division	9	0	0	0	9	0
Liverpool	1907–08	First Division	3	0	0	0	3	0
Liverpool	Total		18	0	1	0	19	0
Stoke	1910–11	Birmingham & District League / Southern League Division Two	8	0	0	0	8	0
Cardiff City	1921–22	First Division	1	0	0	0	1	0
Career total			27	0	1	0	28	0

=== International ===
National team	Year	Apps	Goals
Wales	1905	2	0
Wales	1906	1	0
Wales	1907	3	0
Wales	1908	1	0
Wales	1909	1	0
Wales	1910	1	0
Wales	1911	0	0
Wales	1912	0	0
Wales	1913	1	0
Total		10	0

== Bibliography ==
- Lloyd, Grahame (1999), C'mon City! A Hundred Years of the Bluebirds, Seren, ISBN 1854112716
