= Michael Griffin (footballer) =

English footballer

Personal information
- Date of birth: 21 September 1886
- Place of birth: Middlesbrough, England
- Date of death: 15 December 1923 (aged 37)
- Position: Striker

Senior career*
Years	Team	Apps	(Gls)
1904–1907	Darlington St Augustine's		
1908–1909	Liverpool	4	
1909–1910	Crystal Palace	34	
1910–1912	Hartlepools United	60	(5)
1912–1915	Barnsley	69	(7)
Total		167	(12)
- * Club domestic league appearances and goals

Michael Griffin (born September 1886) was an English footballer who played as a striker.
