= Percy Saul =

English footballer (1881–1965)

Percy Saul (December 1881 – 31 January 1965) was an English footballer who played as a defender for Liverpool in The Football League. Saul played as a full back and made 94 appearances for Plymouth Argyle F.C. before he signed for Liverpool in 1906. Saul played the majority of the matches during his debut season in 1906–07, due to an injury to regular full back Alf West. He made further appearances during his remaining two seasons at the club, but was never a regular starter.
