= Harry Griffiths (footballer, born 1886) =

English footballer (1886–1933)

Harry Griffiths (1 February 1886 – 1933) was an English footballer who played as a defender. He played for Liverpool between 1905/06 and 1907/08, making 6 league appearances for the club. He later went on to play for Chesterfield and Partick Thistle.
