= John Macdonald (footballer, born 1886) =

Scottish footballer

Personal information
- Date of birth: 1886
- Place of birth: Kirkcaldy, Scotland
- Date of death: 1960 (aged 73–74)
- Place of death: East Wemyss, Scotland
- Position: Outside right

Youth career
- Wemyss Harp
- Vale of Wemyss

Senior career*
Years	Team	Apps	(Gls)
1902–1907	Raith Rovers	57	(14)
1907–1909	Rangers	46	(10)
1909–1912	Liverpool	78	(4)
1912–1914	Newcastle United	31	(4)
1914–1919	Dundee	13	(1)
1919–1920	Raith Rovers	4	(0)
Total		229	(33)
- * Club domestic league appearances and goals

John Macdonald (1886 – 1960) was a Scottish footballer who played mainly as an outside right.

Born in Fife, he commenced his playing career with Raith Rovers in 1901 before moving to Rangers in January 1907. He was signed by for Liverpool of the English Football League in 1909, and made 35 total appearances (league and FA Cup) in his debut season; 26 and 20 appearances followed during his next two years at the club, and he came close to receiving an international call-up for Scotland, taking part in the annual Home Scots v Anglo-Scots trial match in 1910.

He was unable to hold a regular starting place in the Liverpool side, and moved to Newcastle United in 1912. He served in the Gordon Highlanders during World War I while resuming his sporting career back in Scotland with Dundee. He retired in 1921 after a second spell with Raith Rovers, and found work locally as a miner.

Macdonald had six brothers, two of whom – David and Roy – were also footballers. All three were members of the Dundee squad in the 1919–20 season.
