= James Stewart (footballer, born 1885) =

Scottish footballer

Personal information
- Date of birth: 1885
- Place of birth: Dumbarton, Scotland
- Date of death: 28 July 1960 (aged 74–75)
- Height: 5 ft 6 1/2 in (1.69 m)
- Position: Full back

Senior career*
| Years | Team | Apps | (Gls) |
| 1905–1909 | Motherwell | 72 | (26) |
| 1909–1913 | Liverpool | 61 | (26) |
| 1914–1919 | Hamilton | 106 | (49) |
| 1917–1918 | → Dumbarton (loan) | 20 | (10) |
| 1922–1924 | King's Park | 33 | (6) |
| 1923–1925 | Broxburn United | 8 | (4) |
| 1924–1925 | King's Park | 12 | (0) |
| 1924–1925 | Forfar Athletic | 7 | (0) |
| 1925–1929 | King's Park | 29 | (3) |
- * Club domestic league appearances and goals

James Stewart (1885 – 28 July 1960) was a Scottish footballer who played as an inside right. Stewart played for Motherwell before he joined Liverpool in 1909. He made his English Football League debut at the start of the 1909–10 season and played every match bar one, as Liverpool finished as runners-up. He scored 18 goals during his debut season, but he was unable to replicate this form over the following seasons as he only made a further 25 appearances in the next four seasons. He left Liverpool in 1913 and returned to Scotland to play for Hamilton Academical. He later worked as a trainer (assisted in some cases by his son of the same name) at clubs including Hamilton, Blackpool, Dundee and Portsmouth.
