= Jimmy Harrop =

English footballer

Personal information
- Full name: James Harrop
- Date of birth: January 1884
- Place of birth: Sheffield, Yorkshire, England
- Date of death: 25 May 1954 (aged 70)
- Height: 5 ft 9 1/2 in (1.77 m)
- Position: Centre-half

Youth career
- 1902–1903: Ranmoor Wesleyans

Senior career*
Years	Team	Apps	(Gls)
1903–1905	Sheffield Wednesday	0	(0)
1905–1907	Denaby United		
1907–1908	Rotherham Town		
1908–1912	Liverpool	133	(4)
1912–1921	Aston Villa	153	(4)
1921–1922	Sheffield United	14	(0)
1922–1924	Burton All Saints		
- * Club domestic league appearances and goals

James Harrop (January 1884 – 25 May 1954) was an English footballer.

== Life and playing career ==
Born in Eccleshall, Yorkshire. January 1884.

He died on 25 May 1954, in Edale Derbyshire, aged 70

Harrop played for Sheffield Wednesday, Denaby United and Rotherham Town (who merged with Rotherham County in 1919 to form Rotherham United) before being signed by Liverpool manager Tom Watson in 1907. Making his Liverpool debut in a Football League Division One match on 18 January 1908, he scored his first goal 18 months later on 27 March 1909. Harrop, a centre-half, only made 8 appearances in his first season but went on to play 139 matches for the Anfield club during his 5 seasons, scoring 4 times.

Harrop left the Reds at the end of the 1912 season and joined Aston Villa where, playing as a centre back, he played across the five seasons between 1912-13 and 1920-21, scoring four goals.

Harrop finished his career at Sheffield United.

== Honours ==
Aston Villa

- FA Cup: 1912–13
