= John McConnell (footballer, born 1885) =

Scottish footballer

John McConnell (24 November 1885 – 27 December 1947) was a Scottish footballer who played as a half back for Liverpool in the English Football League. McConnell played for Scottish clubs Ashfield (1904–1907), Motherwell (1907–08) and Airdrie (1908–09) before he joined Liverpool. He made 53 appearances for the club and scored once, but was unable to become a regular in the starting line-up and he eventually moved back to Scotland to play for Aberdeen.
