= Robert Crawford (footballer) =

Scottish footballer

Personal information
- Full name: Robert Stuart Crawford
- Date of birth: 4 July 1886
- Place of birth: Blythswood, Renfrewshire, Scotland
- Date of death: c. 1950 (aged 63–64)
- Height: 5 ft 8 1/2 in (1.74 m)
- Position: Defender

Youth career
- 1902–1905: Barrhead BC

Senior career*
| Years | Team | Apps | (Gls) |
| 1904–1909 | Arthurlie | 68 | (2) |
| 1909–1915 | Liverpool | 108 | (1) |
- * Club domestic league appearances and goals

Robert Crawford (4 July 1886 – ca. 1950) was a footballer who played for Liverpool during the early part of the 20th century.

== Life and playing career ==
Born in Blythswood, Scotland, Crawford began his career at Arthurlie in Scottish Division Two before being signed by Liverpool manager Tom Watson in January 1909. He made his debut in a Football League First Division game at Anfield on the 13 February 1909, a game that saw the Reds beat Leicester Fosse 4–1. He scored his one and only goal for the club on the 4 October 1913 in the heavy 4–1 defeat at the hands of The Wednesday (Sheffield Wednesday) at Owlerton, the consolation goal coming from the penalty spot. Crawford, a full-back, played 31 times during the 1910–11 campaign, the most he played for the club in any one season. He spent six years at Anfield putting together 114 appearances.

Crawford left Liverpool in 1915 due to the outbreak of the First World War, during which he served in the Royal Engineers. His career did not resume after the end of the war.
