= James Hughes (footballer, born 1885) =

English footballer

Personal information
- Date of birth: December 1885
- Place of birth: Bootle, England
- Date of death: 1948 (aged 62–63)
- Position: Defender

Youth career
- 1902–1903: Bedford
- 1903: Diamond Match Works
- 1903: Bootle Amateurs
- 1903–1904: Hertford Albion

Senior career*
Years	Team	Apps	(Gls)
1904–1909	Liverpool	14	(0)
1909–1920	Crystal Palace	200	(15)
1920–1922	Chatham		
- * Club domestic league appearances and goals

James Hughes was an English footballer who played as a defender. He was born in Bootle in December 1885 and played for Liverpool before signing for Crystal Palace in 1909. Between then and 1920 Hughes made 200 appearances for Crystal Palace in the Southern League, scoring 15 times. In 1920 Hughes moved on to Chatham.

He earned one representative cap with the Southern League XI.

Hughes died in 1948, aged 62 or 63.
