= James Gorman (footballer, born in Middlesbrough) =

English footballer (1882–1957)

James Gorman (1882 – 1957) is an English former footballer who played as a defender. Born in Middlesbrough, he played for Liverpool between 1906 and 1908, scoring once in 23 appearances. He also played for Hartlepool United and Leicester Fosse.
