= John Carlin (footballer) =

English footballer (1878–1935)

Personal information
- Date of birth: 1878
- Date of death: 1935 (aged 56–57)
- Position: Striker

Senior career*
Years	Team	Apps	(Gls)
- Liverpool
- Preston North End
- * Club domestic league appearances and goals

John Carlin (1878 – 1935) was an English footballer who played as a striker for Liverpool in The Football League. He made his debut for Liverpool during the 1902–3 season, replacing the injured Sam Raybould in what was his only appearance of the season. During his four years at the club he appeared sporadically failing to claim a regular place in the team. However, during Liverpool's title winning 1905/06 season he made 16 appearances, 14 of those in the league, scoring 6 goals. He would later play for Preston North End.
