= Ernest Peake =

Welsh footballer

Ernest Peake (born 1888) was a Welsh footballer who played as a defender for Liverpool in the English Football League. Peake was a Welsh international who played for Aberystwyth Town F.C. (when he was 15 years of age) in mid-field before he signed for Liverpool in 1909. He only appeared sporadically until the 1912–13 season when he played 26 matches. He was unable to command a regular place in the team and he left for Scottish team Third Lanark A.C. in 1914. After finishing his playing career, he moved to Aberdare in Wales where he had a position as player/manager of Aberamman. As footballers were not on the same wage as they are today and he had two sons (another died in infancy due to an accident) and a wife to support so he had to work in a colliery called Brown's pit which was in Aberdare. He worked on the surface so he was a collier where he remained until his death due to ill-health unrelated to the colliery in November 1931.

His brother, Robert, was a Welsh amateur international and played for Cardiff City and Rochdale.
