= George Fleming (footballer, born 1869) =

Scottish footballer (1869–1922)

George Fleming (20 May 1869 – 12 August 1922) was a Scottish footballer who played as a defender for Liverpool in The Football League. Fleming was born on 20 May 1869 in Bannockburn, Scotland. He started his career at East Stirlingshire, before he moved to Wolverhampton Wanderers, where he made 187 appearances for the club from 1894 to 1901. Fleming was transferred to Liverpool in 1901, he made 26 appearances in his debut season, which decreased the following seasons. He made more appearances in the 1905–06 season, but the following season he only appeared sporadically and eventually became the assistant trainer at Liverpool.
