= Sam Bowyer =

English footballer

Personal information
- Full name: Samuel Bowyer
- Date of birth: 12 October 1887
- Place of birth: Northwich, England
- Date of death: 1961 or 1967
- Position: Inside left

Youth career
- Lostock & Earlestown

Senior career*
Years	Team	Apps	(Gls)
1907–1911	Liverpool	45	(14)
1911–1913	Bristol City	49	(14)
1907–1911	South Liverpool		
- * Club domestic league appearances and goals

Samuel Bowyer (12 October 1887 - 1961 or 1967) was an English footballer who made over 90 appearances in the Football League before the First World War.

== Career ==
Diminutive inside forward 'Steve' Bowyer initially played for Lostock and once scored four goals in six minutes against Altrincham. He played as a striker for Liverpool in The Football League. Bowyer played for Earlestown before he was signed by Liverpool. He joined Liverpool in July 1907, but only made four appearances during his debut season. During his four years at the club he was never a regular in the starting lineup, though he still made 48 appearances for the club, scoring 16 goals before he left in 1912. He joined Bristol City in February 1912 after he left Liverpool, he made 49 appearances for the club scoring 14 goals. Sam Hollis signed both Bowyer and Joe Brough for Bristol City from First Division Liverpool. "Steve" Bowyer formed an exciting partnership with Ebenezer "Ginger" Owers in the attack at Bristol City. Bowyer made his debut in the Second Division at inside left in a 3–2 win at Gainsborough Trinity on 17 February 1912 scoring one of the goals. In the 1911–12 season Bowyer made 13 appearances scoring five goals as Bristol City finished 13th of 20 clubs in the Second Division. In the following season Bristol City dropped to 16th and Bowyer missed only two matches making 36 appearances scoring nine goals including a brace in each of three home matches v Grimsby Town 2–2 draw, v Stockport County 7–2 win and v Barnsley in a 3–0 win. In July 1913 Bowyer moved to South Liverpool.
