= Tom Rogers (footballer) =

English footballer

Tom Rogers (born 1885) was an English footballer who played as a defender for Liverpool in The Football League. Rogers started his career at Rossendale United where his performances led to a transfer to Liverpool. He made his debut for the club on the last day of the 1907–08 season. The next season, he was a regular in the starting lineup he made 12 appearances for the team before he suffered a serious injury in a match against Nottingham Forest which meant he did not play for 13 months. Following his return he was unable to reclaim his place in the side and only played sporadically.
