= Ronald Orr =

Scottish footballer (1876–1924)

Personal information
- Full name: Ronald Guinness Orr Gunion
- Date of birth: 6 August 1876
- Place of birth: Bartonholm, Scotland
- Date of death: 21 March 1924 (aged 47)
- Place of death: Kilwinning, Scotland
- Position: Inside forward

Senior career*
Years	Team	Apps	(Gls)
1896–1897	Kilwinning Eglinton		
1897–1898	Glossop North End		
1898–1901	St Mirren	55	(27)
1901–1908	Newcastle United	160	(59)
1908–1912	Liverpool	108	(36)
1912	Raith Rovers	5	(1)
1912–1913	South Shields		

International career
1902–1904	Scotland	2	(1)
- * Club domestic league appearances and goals

Ronald Guinness Orr Gunion (6 August 1876 – 21 March 1924) was a Scottish footballer, who played for Newcastle United and Liverpool amongst others in the early 20th century. He played twice for Scotland in 1902 and 1904, scoring one goal.

== Club career ==
Born in Bartonholm (by Kilwinning), Ayrshire, Orr was an inside forward who played for Kilwinning Eglinton, Glossop North End and St Mirren. Orr scored 32 goals in 67 matches for St. Mirren and was snapped up by Newcastle United as a result, signing him in May 1901. He scored twice on his home debut at St James' Park, something he would become familiar for. He scored a brace 13 times, nine in the league, only managing a single hat-trick, four against Notts County in October 1901. Orr enjoyed success during his seven seasons on Tyneside, winning the League Championship twice in 1905 and 1907. However, in the FA Cup, he was not selected for their 1905 FA Cup Final defeat to Aston Villa, despite having scored 4 goals in 6 of their cup ties on the way. More disappointment again when Newcastle lost the 1906 FA Cup Final 1–0 against Everton, who had scored 4 goals in 7 cup ties this time.

Orr also earned two full international caps for Scotland whilst with Newcastle, scoring on his debut in a 2–2 draw against England at Villa Park on 3 May 1902, in the British Home Championship. His other appearance was also against England, the Scots losing 1–0 at Celtic Park on 9 April 1904, again in the British Home Championship.

After a successful period at Newcastle, Orr joined Liverpool in April 1908, when manager Tom Watson paid £350 for his transfer. He made his debut in a Football League Division One match at Villa Park against Aston Villa on 4 April 1908, bagging his first goal in the same match. Orr kept up his goalscoring exploits the following season, finishing as the Reds' top scorer with 20 goals from his 33 league starts. None more as important as his last goal on the final day. Liverpool needed a point to avoid relegation, the last day saw Orr and his teammates travel to St James's Park to play Newcastle, league champions for third time in five years. Orr scored the only goal of the game after 78 minutes, saving Liverpool from relegation against his former club. Orr played 7 matches in what would be his last season at Liverpool, shortened after an injury in the Merseyside derby at Goodison Park in September 1911. He left in January 1912, returning to Scotland to play for Raith Rovers. He was back in the Northeast the next season, this time on South Tyneside after signing for South Shields in the North Eastern League. The First World War effectively ended his career, although he did make guest appearances for Fulham. Upon returning home to Scotland, there it was reported that he had died on 21 March 1924 in Kilwinning, aged only 47.

== International career ==
Having scored in a Home Scots v Anglo-Scots international trial match, Orr was selected to make his Scotland debut on 3 May 1902 in a British Home Championship match against England, and he scored to put his side two goals up in an eventual 2–2 draw; like his debut goal for Liverpool, it was at Villa Park (this match was replayed from the original fixture at Ibrox Park, where a stand collapsed, killing 25 spectators and injuring hundreds). His second and last cap was also against England two years later, this time a 1–0 defeat.

== Career statistics ==
Appearances and goals by club, season and competition
Club	Season	League			FA Cup		Total	
Club	Season	Division	Apps	Goals	Apps	Goals	Apps	Goals
St Mirren	1898–99	Scottish Div 1	17	9	3	1	20	10
St Mirren	1899–1900	Scottish Div 1	18	6	2	0	20	6
St Mirren	1900–01	Scottish Div 1	20	12	7	4	27	16
St Mirren	Total		55	27	12	5	67	32
Newcastle United	1901–02	First Division	32	9	4	1	36	10
Newcastle United	1902–03	First Division	23	4	1	0	24	4
Newcastle United	1903–04	First Division	12	11	1	0	13	11
Newcastle United	1904–05	First Division	20	9	6	4	26	13
Newcastle United	1905–06	First Division	35	17	7	4	42	21
Newcastle United	1906–07	First Division	19	4	1	0	20	4
Newcastle United	1907–08	First Division	19	5	0	0	19	5
Newcastle United	Total		160	59	20	9	180	68
Liverpool	1907–08	First Division	7	5	0	0	7	5
Liverpool	1908–09	First Division	33	20	2	3	35	23
Liverpool	1909–10	First Division	31	5	0	0	31	5
Liverpool	1910–11	First Division	30	5	2	0	32	5
Liverpool	1911–12	First Division	7	1	0	0	7	1
Liverpool	Total		108	36	4	3	112	39
Raith Rovers	1911 -12	Scottish Div 1	5	1	2	0	7	1
Career total			328	123	24	12	366	140

== Honours ==
Newcastle United

- Football League First Division: 1904–05, 1906–07
- FA Cup: runner-up 1906
