= Sam Raybould =

English footballer (1875–1949)

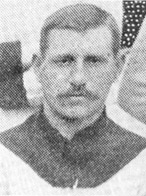

Personal information
- Full name: Samuel Francis Raybould
- Date of birth: 11 June 1875
- Place of birth: Staveley, Derbyshire, England
- Date of death: 1949 (aged 73–74)
- Position: Forward

Senior career*
Years	Team	Apps	(Gls)
- Poolsbrook United
- Staveley Colliery
- North Staveley
–1894	Ilkeston Town		
1894	Derby County	5	(2)
- Ilkeston Town
- Poolsbrook United
- Ilkeston Town
–1899	Bolsover Colliery		
1899–1900	New Brighton Tower	13	(10)
1900–1907	Liverpool	211	(120)
1907–1908	Sunderland	27	(12)
1908–1909	Woolwich Arsenal	26	(6)
1909–?	Chesterfield Town		
- Sutton Town
- Barlborough United
Total		282	(150)
- * Club domestic league appearances and goals

Samuel Francis Raybould (11 June 1875 – 1949) was an English professional footballer. He played as a striker and is most renowned for his days playing for Liverpool.

== Life and playing career ==
Raybould was born in Staveley, Derbyshire and played for Poolsbrook United, Staveley Colliery and North Staveley before joining Chesterfield Town on trial. His trial wasn't successful, and he moved to Ilkeston Town from where he joined Derby County in 1894.

Despite scoring twice in five games for Derby, Raybould returned to non-league football with Ilkeston Town, subsequently playing for Poolsbrook United, Ilkeston Town (for a third spell) and Bolsover Colliery before joining New Brighton Tower in 1899.

He scored ten times in just 13 league games for New Brighton Tower and was signed by manager Tom Watson for Liverpool in January 1900. He made his debut on 13 January 1900 in a 2–0 win over W.B.A at Anfield and scored his first goal for the club a week later on 20 January in the Merseyside derby at Goodison Park a game which saw Everton win 3–1.

Originally an outside right, he switched to centre forward at Liverpool and became a highly successful goalscorer. In the 1902–03 season Raybould set a new record of 31 league goals in a single league season. This record stood until 1931 when Gordon Hodgson broke it by scoring 36 goals.

In 1903 he, along with John Glover and William Goldie were given a seven-month ban from football for agreeing to 'financial inducements' to sign for Southern League Portsmouth. Portsmouth tried to use lack of regulations of transfers between the leagues to their advantage, but their approach was judged illegal. Raybould was suspended for seven months for agreeing to sign for Pompey. He was also given a lifetime ban on ever signing for the south-coast side. Without Raybould Liverpool slumped from fifth place to relegation candidates. His ban lasted until 31 December 1903 but was selected for the first team straight away in January. Raybould scored four goals from 15 games but could not prevent the reds dropping into the Second Division. However, he helped Liverpool to the second division title, contributing 19 goals and went on to score a total of 130 goals in 226 appearances for Liverpool, and remained their record goalscorer for 37 years. As of 2022, he stands as the eleventh highest goalscorer in Liverpool's history, ninth by his league goals.

His record of scoring 67 goals in his first 100 games for Liverpool stood until 2020 when he was overtaken by Mohamed Salah.

After leaving Liverpool in 1907, Raybould moved first to Sunderland where he scored 12 goals in 28 appearances in his solitary season there. He ended his league career at Woolwich Arsenal. He made his Arsenal debut against Everton on 2 September 1908 and played 30 times for Arsenal that season, scoring seven goals.

He left league football in 1909, joining non-league Chesterfield and subsequently playing for Sutton Town and Barlborough United.

Raybould never gained international recognition but was selected 3 times to represent the Football League against the Scottish League.

== Personal life ==
Raybould married Selima Wilkes on 24 December 1897, when he described himself as a miner.

Raybould died in 1949.

== Career statistics ==
Appearances and goals by club, season and competition
Club	Season	League			FA Cup		Other		Total	
Club	Season	Division	Apps	Goals	Apps	Goals	Apps	Goals	Apps	Goals
Derby County	1894–95	First Division	5	2	0	0	0	0	5	2
New Brighton Tower	1899–1900	Second Division	13	10	0	0	0	0	13	10
Liverpool	1889–1900	First Division	11	7	0	0	0	0	11	7
Liverpool	1900–01	First Division	31	17	2	1	0	0	33	18
Liverpool	1901–02	First Division	29	16	0	0	0	0	29	16
Liverpool	1902–03	First Division	33	31	1	1	0	0	34	32
Liverpool	1903–04	First Division	15	4	1	1	0	0	16	5
Liverpool	1904–05	Second Division	32	19	2	0	0	0	34	19
Liverpool	1905–06	First Division	25	11	4	4	1	1 (Note: appearance & goal in the 1906 Sheriff of London Charity Shield)	30	16
Liverpool	1906–07	First Division	35	15	4	2	0	0	39	17
Liverpool	Total		211	120	14	9	1	1	226	130
Sunderland	1907–08	First Division	27	12	1	0	0	0	28	12
Arsenal	1908–09	First Division	26	6	4	1	0	0	30	7
Career total			282	150	19	10	1	1	302	161
