= Tom Chorlton =

English footballer (1880–1948)

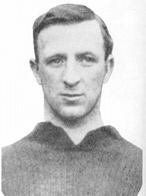

Personal information
- Full name: Thomas Chorlton
- Date of birth: 9 April 1880
- Place of birth: Heaton Mersey, Stockport, England
- Date of death: 4 March 1948 (aged 67)
- Place of death: Manchester, England
- Position: Defender

Senior career*
Years	Team	Apps	(Gls)
1900–1902	Stockport County		
1902–1904	Accrington Stanley		
1904–1912	Liverpool	117	(8)
1912–1914	Manchester United	4	(0)
1914	Stalybridge Celtic		
- * Club domestic league appearances and goals

Tom Chorlton (1880–1948) was a footballer who played for Liverpool in the early 20th century.

== Life and playing career ==
Born in Heaton Mersey, Stockport, Cheshire, England, Chorlton played for All Saints F.C, Northern F.C, Stockport and Accrington Stanley before being signed by Liverpool manager Tom Watson in May 1904. He made his debut in a Football League Division One match on 24 September 1904, scoring his first goal on 29 October. Chorlton spent most of his early days at Anfield flitting in and out of the side, making just 12 appearances in his first season and 27 over the following three campaigns. It was the 1908–09 term that saw Chorlton establish himself as a first choice player, eventually making 35 appearances. Chorlton followed that up with an ever-present season in 1909–10, the only Red to do so. He started the 1910–11 season as a regular, making 7 appearances in 10 games, but lost his place and never really regained it. For a time Chorlton was the club's penalty-taker, which helped him hit 8 goals in his 121 outings for the Anfield club.

Chorlton was transferred to Manchester United in August 1912, one of the few players to have moved directly between the bitter rivals. Chorlton also went on to play for Stalybridge Celtic. His brother, Charles, also played professionally, for Bury.

== Honours ==
- Football League Second Division (Level 2): 1905
