= Maurice Parry =

Wales international footballer (1877–1935)

Maurice Perry
Personal information
- Date of birth: 7 November 1877
- Place of birth: Trefonen, England
- Date of death: 24 March 1935 (aged 57)
- Place of death: Jersey
- Position: Right-half

Senior career*
Years	Team	Apps	(Gls)
1894–1896	Newtown		
1896–1897	Long Eaton Rangers		
1897	Nottingham Forest	0	(0)
1897–1898	Oswestry United		
1898–1899	Leicester Fosse	1	(0)
1898–1899	Loughborough	12	(0)
1899–1900	Brighton United		
1900–1909	Liverpool	206	(4)
1909–1910	Partick Thistle	23	(1)
1910–1911	Wrexham		
1913–1914	Oswestry United		

International career
1901–1909	Wales	16	(0)

Managerial career
- Rotherham County
- 1925–1926: Eintracht Frankfurt
- * Club domestic league appearances and goals

Maurice Parry (7 November 1877 – 24 March 1935) was a Welsh international footballer who played for Liverpool in the early 20th century, helping them to two Football League First Division titles.

== Playing career ==
Born in Trefonen, Shropshire, Parry played for Newtown, Long Eaton Rangers, Leicester Fosse, Loughborough and the short-lived Brighton United before being signed by Liverpool manager Tom Watson in March 1900 making his debut in a First Division match on 13 October the same year, a game which the Reds won 2-1 against Bolton Wanderers at Anfield. He had to wait until 1 April 1904 before he scored his first goal, it came in the derby against Everton, a game that saw the Reds slump to a 5-2 defeat. Parry never really established himself as a "first choice" player during his nine-year Liverpool career but he still managed 222 appearances for the Reds, helping them to two First Division titles, but not playing enough times to earn a medal for the 1901 title win. After leaving the club in May 1909, Parry along with the then Liverpool captain Alex Raisbeck joined Scottish side Partick. He would join Wrexham in 1910 before emigrating to South Africa in 1911.

Parry played for Wales on 14 occasions, making his debut against Ireland on 23 March 1901 in a British Championship match.

== Coaching and management career ==
After leaving Thistle Parry went into coaching and got a post in South Africa but moved back to Oswestry to take up a role with Oswestry Town. Parry then, like many others, was affected by the First World War where he was badly gassed during military service on the Balkans theatre, but he returned to his passion after the war taking the managerial post at Rotherham County, who later merged with Rotherham Town to form Rotherham United in 1925. Parry then took up coaching roles with the more impressive clubs of Barcelona in Spain and both Eintracht Frankfurt and 1. FC Köln in Germany before returning to the British Isles taking up a coaching role on the Channel Islands.

== Family ==
Parry's brother Thomas was also a Wales international: the two brothers played together for their country four times. His son, Frank, was also a professional footballer and made over 100 appearances in the Football League.
