= Joe Hewitt (footballer, born 1881) =

English footballer (1881–1971)

Personal information
- Full name: Joseph Hewitt
- Date of birth: 3 May 1881
- Place of birth: Chester, England
- Date of death: 12 March 1971 (aged 89)
- Place of death: Liverpool, England
- Height: 5 ft 8 in (1.73 m)
- Position: Forward

Youth career
- 1897-1898: Newton Athletic
- 1898-1899: Chester Locos
- 1899-1900: Newton Athletic

Senior career*
Years	Team	Apps	(Gls)
1901–1904	Sunderland	37	(9)
1904–1910	Liverpool	152	(69)
1910–1911	Bolton Wanderers	11	(3)
1911	Reading		
- * Club domestic league appearances and goals

Joseph Hewitt (3 May 1881 – 12 March 1971) was an English footballer who played as a centre forward or inside forward in the Football League for Sunderland, Liverpool and Bolton Wanderers in the early 20th century. He helped Liverpool win the 1905–06 Football League championship.

== Life and playing career ==
Born in Chester, Cheshire, Hewitt started his career with Newton Rangers and Chester Locos in the Chester and District League. He played for Sunderland before being signed by Liverpool manager Tom Watson in January 1904. Making his debut in a Football League First Division match on 13 February 1904, the centre-forward quickly established himself in the Reds starting line-up but was unable to stop Liverpool's fall from the top flight at the end of the 1903–04 season. The following season proved to be more fortunate for Liverpool as they regained their spot back in England's top division, Hewitt, however, only made 9 appearances, not enough to qualify for a winner's medal. Hewitt did become a key player at Anfield in the 1905–06 campaign as he finished top scorer in the championship-winning side with 24 goals in 37 outings. An injury hit 1906–07 season hampered Hewitts progress but he returned with a flourish bagging 33 goals in 69 appearances over the next two seasons. The 1909–10 season proved to be Hewitt's last for the club as he made just 4 starts, he was transferred to Bolton Wanderers in August 1910 after scoring 73 times in 164 appearances an average of a goal every 2 1/4 games.

Hewitt renewed his acquaintance with Liverpool after he retired in 1911 working behind the scenes.

== Career details ==
As a player:

- Liverpool FC (1904–1910): 164 appearances, 73 goals - Football League Championship winner's medal (1906)
