= Alf West =

English footballer (1881–1944)

Alfred West
Personal information
- Date of birth: 15 December 1881
- Place of birth: Nottingham, England
- Date of death: 27 June 1944 (aged 62)
- Place of death: Radford, Nottingham, England
- Height: 5 ft 8 in (1.73 m)
- Position: Full-back

Senior career*
Years	Team	Apps	(Gls)
- Jardine's Athletic
- Radford Congregational
1900–1902	Ilkeston Town		
1902–1903	Barnsley St. Peter's		
1903–1909	Liverpool	124	(5)
1909–1910	Reading		
1910–1911	Liverpool	4	(0)
1911–1915	Notts County		
1919	Mansfield Town		
1919–1920	Shirebrook		
- * Club domestic league appearances and goals

Alfred West (1881-1944) was an English footballer who played for Liverpool Football Club in the early 20th century, helping them to the 1906 Football League Championship.

== Life and playing career ==
=== Early life ===
Born in Nottingham, Nottinghamshire, England, on 15 December 1881, West played for local clubs Notts Jardine, Radford Congregational and Ilkeston Town before joining Barnsley St. Peter's (later to become Barnsley) in 1902. He quickly impressed, becoming the subject of a bid from Small Heath and attracting interest from other clubs.

When West was signed by Liverpool manager Tom Watson in November 1903, Barnsley St. Peter's rewarded him with a testimonial match. The transfer fee paid by Liverpool to Barnsley for West's services was £500. The uncompromising full-back went straight into the starting 11 upon signing, and he made his debut in a Football League Division One match against Notts County at Anfield on 7 November 1903, a game that Liverpool won 2–1. His first goal was a penalty kick scored in a 3–0 victory over Bury on 16 April 1904 at Anfield. He couldn't prevent the Anfield club from being relegated at the end of the 1903–04 season just a point short of Stoke's tally. Due to an injury caused by a shooting accident while preparing for a sprint race with his trainer William Norman, West did not make his first appearance of the 1904–05 season until he played in a 3–1 loss to Manchester United on 24 December 1904. Despite this, West played in 16 matches of that Second Division campaign as the Reds shot straight back to the top flight, winning the second division title in 1905. A year later West added a League championship medal to his collection as he missed just one game of the 1905–06 season. The following season, a combination of an injury suffered in a game against Middlesbrough and a "severe family tragedy" restricted West to just four appearances.

West moved on to Reading in June 1909 for a short spell for a transfer fee described as "heavy". During his time at Reading, he served as club secretary. He returned to Merseyside when Watson resigned him in 1910. He made four more appearances for Liverpool before leaving for Notts County in July 1911 – a move which surprised Liverpool's fans. He remained at the Meadow Lane club until the start of the First World War.

During the War, West was shot in the leg, causing him to return home in 1916. By 1917, he was back in action in France. West survived the War, and had short spells playing for Mansfield Town and Shirebrook before retiring.

He died in Radford, Nottingham on 27 June 1944.

== Career details ==
As a player:

- Liverpool FC (1903 – 1909 & 1910 – 1911): 141 appearances, 6 goals – Football League Championship winner's medal (1906), Football League Second Division winner's medal (1905).
