= Billy Dunlop (footballer, born 1874) =

Scottish footballer (1874–1941)

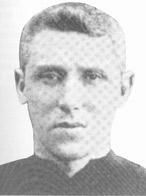

Personal information
- Full name: William Peden Dunlop
- Date of birth: 11 August 1874
- Place of birth: Hurlford, Ayrshire, Scotland
- Date of death: 28 November 1941 (aged 67)
- Place of death: Stanhope, County Durham, England
- Height: 5 ft 9 1/2 in (1.77 m)
- Position: Left-back

Youth career
- 1888–1890: Sandyford
- 1890–1892: Hurlford

Senior career*
Years	Team	Apps	(Gls)
1892–1894	Kilmarnock		
1894	Abercorn	18	(0)
1894–1909	Liverpool	325	(2)

International career
1906	Scotland	1	(0)
- * Club domestic league appearances and goals

William Peden Dunlop (11 August 1874 – 28 November 1941) was a Scottish footballer who played for Liverpool in the late 19th and early 20th centuries, earning two Football League championship medals. Dunlop played once for Scotland, in 1906.

== Life and playing career ==
Dunlop played for Sandyford, Hurlford, Kilmarnock and Abercorn in Scotland before being signed by Liverpool managers John McKenna and William Barclay in January 1895 for £35. He made his Liverpool debut in a Football League First Division match a 3–2 home defeat at the hands of Sunderland on the 25 March 1895, a season which saw Liverpool relegated from the top flight. The left sided full-back would have enjoyed his second season a bit more as Liverpool gained promotion straight back to the First Division in 1895–96. Dunlop's early appearances for the Reds were sporadic but his loyalty and dedication paid off as he was to become a regular starter over a 10-year period which included the Anfield club's first ever Football League Championship win in 1900–01, a feat they were to repeat in 1905–06 (after another relegation in 1903–04 followed by promotion 1904–05 in a turbulent period). Dunlop scored just twice for Liverpool, his first coming on the 19 September 1903 in a 1–1 draw with Stoke at Anfield.

Having earlier been overlooked despite a strong performance in the Home Scots v Anglo-Scots trial match in 1901, Dunlop earned one international cap when he represented Scotland against England on 7 April 1906, a game Scotland won 2–1 in a British Home Championship fixture at Hampden Park, Glasgow. Dunlop's Liverpool teammate Alex Raisbeck also played in the match, captaining the Scots.

He later worked for Sunderland for three decades as a trainer and masseur until his death in 1941.

== Honours ==
Liverpool

- Football League Champions: 1900–01, 1905–06
- Football League Second Division: 1895–96, 1904–05
