= Jack Cox (footballer) =

English footballer and manager (1877–1955)

Personal information
- Full name: John Thomas Cox
- Date of birth: 21 December 1877
- Place of birth: Liverpool, England
- Date of death: 11 November 1955 (aged 77)
- Position: Winger

Youth career
- South Shore

Senior career*
Years	Team	Apps	(Gls)
1897–1898	Blackpool	17	(12)
1898–1909	Liverpool	327	(72)
1909–1912	Blackpool	68	(6)
Total		412	(90)

International career^{‡}
1901–1903	England	3	(0)

Managerial career
- 1909–1911: Blackpool (player-manager)
- * Club domestic league appearances and goals as of 31 December 1912 ‡ National team caps and goals as of 31 December 1912

John Thomas Cox (21 December 1877 – 11 November 1955) was an English international footballer who played for Liverpool in the late 19th and early 20th centuries, in between spells at Blackpool. He helped Liverpool to two Football League Championships.

== Career ==
Born in Liverpool, Lancashire (now Merseyside), Cox played for South Shore Standard, South Shore, and Blackpool before being signed by Liverpool managers John McKenna and William Barclay in February 1898 for the then-large sum of £150, enabling the Lancashire club to announce a loss of "only" £441 for the season, as opposed to over £1,000 for the previous campaign.

The winger made his debut on 12 March 1898, in a First Division match against Notts County at Anfield in a 2–0 win, which also saw his debut goal for the club. Cox became a regular starter for the Reds on both the left and right flanks, helping them secure their first two championships, in 1901 and 1906.

Although the one who predominantly lined up goals for his teammates to take, Cox, himself, had an eye for the mark and scored 81 goals from his 361 starts, an average of one goal every 4.5 games. It was this kind of form that caught the eye of the FA, who selected Cox for the British Home Championship match against Ireland at The Dell, Southampton on 9 March 1901. This match saw England win 3–0, after which he represented England on two further occasions. Cox left Liverpool in 1909, returning to Blackpool, effectively as player-manager.

Cox was also a top crown green bowler after his football career finished, he won the game's biggest tournaments, the Talbot and Waterloo in 1925, the first and so far the only person to do so in the same year.

== Personal life ==
Cox's younger brother, Bill, was also a footballer and died of wounds suffered while serving during the First World War.

== Career details ==
As a player:

- Liverpool (1898–1909) – 361 appearances, 81 goals – Football League Championship winner's medal (1901, 1906)
- England (1901–1903) – 3 appearances
