= Robbie Robinson (footballer) =

English footballer (1879–1951)

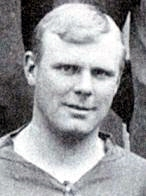
Robbie Robinson in 1904

Robert Robinson (October 1879 – 1951) was a footballer who played for Liverpool in the early 20th century, helping them to the Football League First Division title in 1906.

== Life and playing career ==
Born in Sunderland, County Durham, Robinson played for Sunderland Royal Rovers and Sunderland before being signed by Liverpool manager Tom Watson in February 1904. He made his debut in a Football League Division One match on 13 February 1904, with his first goal coming 9 days later on 22 February. Robinson, a forward, made 9 appearances scoring 5 goals during the run in to the end of the season. Unfortunately, this wasn't enough to prevent the Reds from being relegated to the second division having fallen short of Stoke by just 1 point. The 1904/05 season proved to be more fruitful for Robinson, as he finished as top scorer with 23 goals in his 32 outings as the Anfield club bounced straight back to the top flight, having pipped Bolton by 2 points. Robbie followed up the promotion winning campaign with a creditable 11 goals as Liverpool went on to win the league title beating Preston by 4 points. Robbie was switched from the front line to a half-back position towards the end of his Liverpool career, thus scuppering the decent goals per game tally he'd amassed. Robinson ended up making 271 appearances for Liverpool, scoring 64 goals before moving to Tranmere in 1912.

== Career details ==
As a player:

- Liverpool FC (1904–1912): 271 appearances, 64 goals
- Football League Championship winner's medal (1906)
- Football League Second Division winner's medal (1905)
