= Arthur Goddard (footballer) =

English footballer (1878–1956)

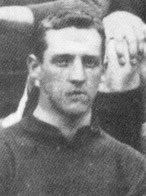

Personal information
- Full name: Arthur Milton Goddard
- Date of birth: 14 June 1878
- Place of birth: Heaton Norris, Stockport, England
- Date of death: 27 May 1956 (aged 77)
- Place of death: Liverpool, England
- Height: 5 ft 9 in (1.75 m)
- Position: Winger

Senior career*
Years	Team	Apps	(Gls)
1895–1897	Heaton Norris Rovers		
1897–1899	Stockport County	35	(1)
1899–1902	Glossop North End	77	(20)
1902–1914	Liverpool	387	(72)
1914–1915	Cardiff City	31	(8)
- * Club domestic league appearances and goals

Arthur Milton Goddard (14 June 1878 – 27 May 1956) was an English professional footballer who played for Liverpool in the early 20th century, helping them to win the 1906 Football League Championship.

== Life and playing career ==
Born in Heaton Norris, Stockport, Cheshire, Goddard began playing football at the age of 16 for local side Christ Church where he helped the club to two titles in the Stockport and District League and one Stockport Cup title. In 1897, he joined Stockport County, then known as Heaton Norris Rovers. He initially struggled to break into the first-team but helped the club's reserve side win two local cups. Towards the end of the 1897–98 season, he made his debut for the senior team against Wigan County where he scored his side's only goal.

He remained largely with the reserve side until December 1898 when he was promoted to the first-team on a permanent basis. He gained significant attention from other club's after being described as "instrumental" in Stockport's 3–1 victory over Glossop North End in the semi-final of the Manchester Cup. He also played in the final of the competition as Stockport defeated Bury. His performances resulted in several approaches being made to sign him and Stockport eventually accepted a bid of £260 from Glossop North End, the highest fee ever paid for a Lancashire League player. He joined the club in their first season in the First Division and suffered relegation as the team finished in last place.

He remained with Glossop until February 1902, being signed by Liverpool for £460 by manager Tom Watson. He made his Liverpool debut on 8 March 1902 in a First Division match against Wolverhampton Wanderers at Molineux which Wolves won 3–1.

Goddard spent 12 years at Anfield notching 80 goals in his 415 appearances which included a run of 23 consecutive FA Cup appearances. Goddard became a regular in the Reds side during his first 3 seasons, missing just 2 games. He was part of the Second Division championship winning side of 1905 which went on to claim the championship a year later where he was the only player not to miss a game. Goddard remained a consistent performer for Liverpool over the next 7 seasons, averaging 30 games per season. After starting the in 10 of the first 11 games of the 1913–14 season Goddard lost his place and only played for the Reds one more time before leaving for Southern Football League side Cardiff City in September 1914.

His smooth wing play earned him the nickname 'Graceful Arthur', his style of play also helped him to three Football League representative appearances although he wasn't selected to play at full international level by England.

Much loved by the Anfield faithful, Goddard was granted a testimonial which raised monumental sum of £250 enough for Goddard to set up a business on Merseyside after he retired from playing. On 29 May 1956 it was reported in the Liverpool Echo that Goddard had died after being in ill health for some time, although no exact date was given, and that his funeral would take place on 31 May at Anfield cemetery.

== Career details ==
As a player:

- Liverpool F.C. (1902–1914): 415 appearances, 80 goals - Football League Championship winner's medal (1906), Football League Second Division winners medal (1905)
