= Jack Parkinson (footballer, born 1883) =

English footballer (1883–1942)

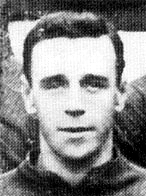
- Liverpool team photo in 1903

Personal information
- Full name: John Parkinson
- Date of birth: 21 September 1883
- Place of birth: Bootle, England
- Date of death: 13 September 1942 (aged 58)
- Height: 5 ft 9 in (1.75 m)
- Position: Striker

Senior career*
| Years | Team | Apps | (Gls) |
| 1903–1914 | Liverpool | 199 | (123) |
| 1914–1915 | Bury | 4 | (3) |
| Total | | 203 | (126) |

International career
| 1910 | England | 2 | (0) |
- * Club domestic league appearances and goals

John Parkinson (21 September 1883 – 13 September 1942) was an England international footballer who played for Liverpool as a striker.

== Club career ==
Born in Bootle, Lancashire (now Merseyside), England, Parkinson began his career at Anfield rising through the youth ranks and breaking into the first team in 1903. He made his debut on 3 October in a 2–1 victory against Small Heath at Muntz Street, scoring after sixteen minutes. That season Parkinson scored six goals in seventeen games, and in the 1904–05 season he scored 21 times in 23 appearances.

Injury hampered Parkinson's career to some extent, including a broken wrist sustained in a match against Woolwich Arsenal in Liverpool's championship-winning season of 1905–06. He played nine times in the campaign, scoring seven goals, though this was not enough appearances to qualify for a medal. Parkinson's most prolific season for the Reds was the 1909–10 campaign, which saw him top the league's goalscoring list with thirty goals in 31 games. Over the following three seasons, Parkinson scored a further 43 times.

The 1913–14 season proved to be Parkinson's final for Liverpool, making only six appearances, his last being a 1–2 defeat at Burden Park against Bolton on 14 February 1914. He moved to Bury in 1914 and retired from the game during World War I to become a newsagent.

Jack was the great grandfather of the current Liverpool FC Operations Director, Andrew Parkinson.

== International career ==
Parkinson won two England caps, the first of which came on 14 March 1910 at Cardiff Arms Park in a 1–0 win against Wales.

== Honours ==
Liverpool

- Football League Second Division champions: 1904–05
- Football League First Division champions: 1905–06
- Sheriff of London Charity Shield winners: 1906

Individual

- Football League First Division Top Goalscorer: 1909–10
