= Tom Watson (football manager) =

English football manager (1859–1915)

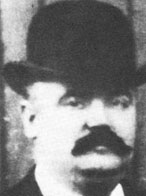
- Watson in 1896

Personal information
- Date of birth: April 1859
- Place of birth: Newcastle upon Tyne, England
- Date of death: 6 May 1915 (aged 56)
- Place of death: Liverpool, England

Senior career*
Years	Team	Apps	(Gls)
- Woodbine
- Rosewood
- Heaton

Managerial career
- Newcastle West End
- Newcastle East End
- 1888–1896: Sunderland
- 1896–1915: Liverpool
- * Club domestic league appearances and goals

Tom Watson (April 1859 – 6 May 1915) was an English football manager who managed Sunderland and Liverpool around the turn of the 20th century. In winning the league title with both clubs—the first title for both—he was the first manager to do so with two clubs. Watson remains Liverpool's longest-serving manager, spending a total of nineteen years at the club. The Guardian described him as "the first truly great manager in English football history".

== Early career ==
In 1881, Watson formed Newcastle upon Tyne-based club Rosehill. Being involved in local football, Watson played for local clubs Woodbine, Rosewood and Heaton. Prior to joining Sunderland, Watson was involved in a secretarial capacity at hometown clubs Newcastle West End and Newcastle East End. Acting as a general manager for both clubs, Watson helped Newcastle West End secure a lease of St James' Park, before resigning in December 1887 due to a crush at a game between Shankhouse, who had been loaned St James' Park, and Aston Villa. Watson later joined Newcastle East End in time for the 1888–89 season, where he continued to recruit Scottish international players, a tactic he had employed at West End.

== Sunderland ==
Watson was in charge at Sunderland for six seasons from 1889 to 1896. During this time, he led the club into the Football League. Under his guidance, Sunderland won three league championships in 1891–92, 1892–93 and 1894–95, making him the most successful manager in their history. Watson's Sunderland were declared the "Team of All Talents" by William McGregor, the founder of the league, after a 7–2 win against Aston Villa.

== Liverpool ==
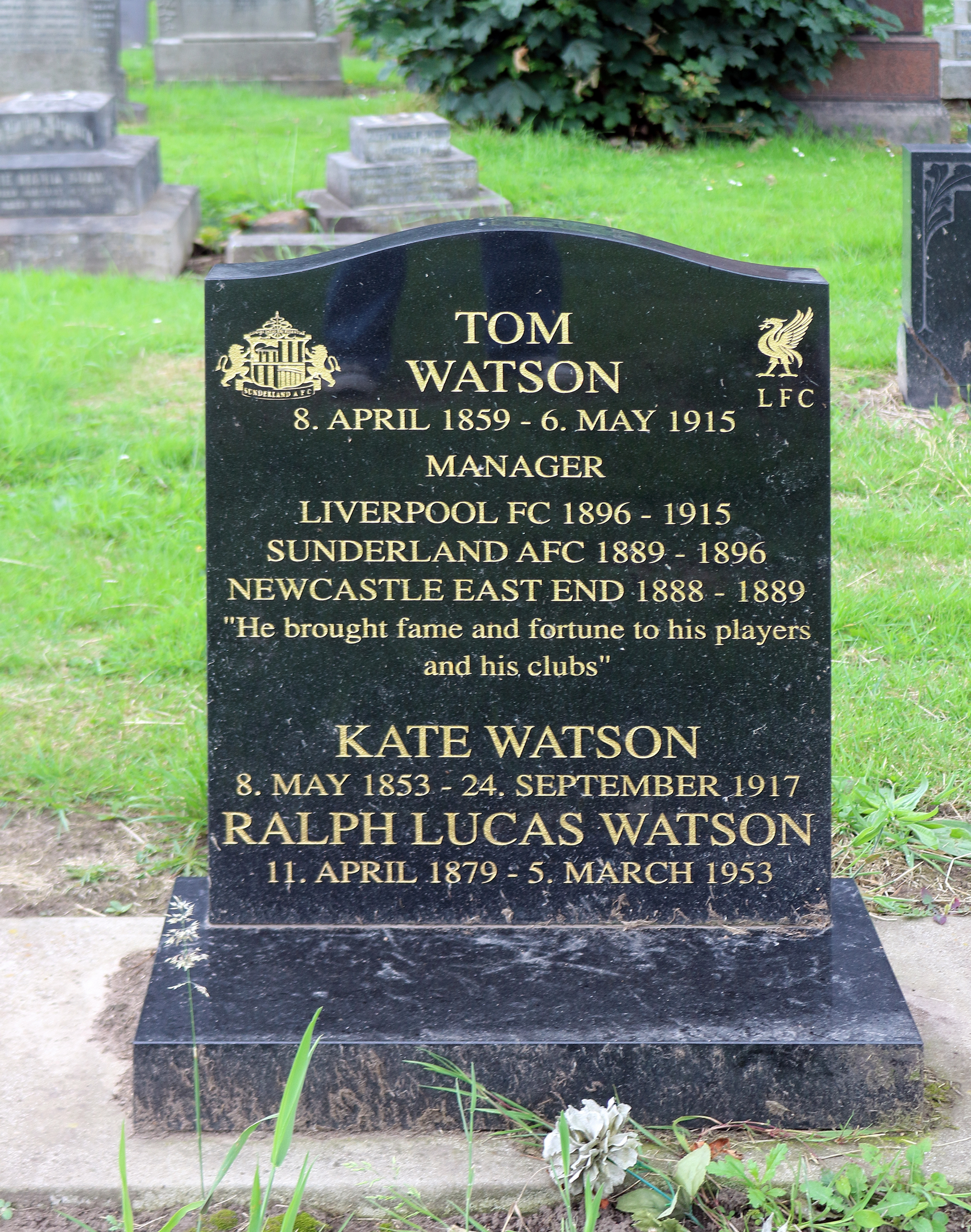
Watson's grave at Anfield Cemetery, Liverpool

Watson moved to Liverpool in 1896 and enjoyed further success there until his death in 1915. Liverpool's longest-serving manager, during his nineteen years in charge he won the league on two occasions, in 1900–01 and 1905–06. Those were the first league titles in Liverpool history. He therefore became the first manager to lead two different clubs to the League Championship. There have been only three others since; Herbert Chapman, Brian Clough and Kenny Dalglish. Watson also took Liverpool to their first FA Cup final in 1914, which they lost 1–0 to Burnley. In late April 1915, after returning from a visit to Newcastle to celebrate his 56th birthday, he contracted a chill which developed into a fatal bout of pneumonia. He died on 6 May 1915 and is buried at Anfield Cemetery, his coffin having been carried by many players.

== Career statistics ==
Managerial record by team and tenure
Team	From	To	Record				
Team	From	To	P	W	D	L	Win %
Newcastle East End	1889	1890	21	11	3	7	52.4
Newcastle West End	1889	1890	20	13	2	5	65.0
Sunderland	August 1889	17 August 1896	191	119	28	44	62.3
Liverpool	17 August 1896	6 May 1915	742	329	141	272	44.3
			974	472	174	328	48.5

== Honours ==
=== As manager ===
==== Sunderland (1889–96) ====
- Football League First Division
  - Winner: 1891–92, 1892–93, 1894–95
  - Runner-up: 1893–94

==== Liverpool (1896–1915) ====
- Football League First Division
  - Winner: 1900–01, 1905–06
  - Runner-up: 1898–99, 1909–1910
- Football League Second Division
  - Winner: 1904–05
- FA Cup
  - Runner-up: 1913–14
- Sheriff of London Charity Shield
  - Winner: 1906–07

== See also ==
- List of English football championship winning managers
