= 1899–1900 Liverpool F.C. season =

English football club season

Liverpool
1899–1900 season
- Manager: Tom Watson
- First Division: 10th
- FA Cup: Second round
- Top goalscorer: League: John Walker (10); All: John Walker (10) Tommy Robertson (10)
Home colours

The 1899–1900 season was the eighth season in Liverpool F.C.'s existence, and was their seventh year in The Football League, in which they competed in the first division.

== Squad statistics ==
=== Appearances and goals ===
| No. | Pos | Nat | Player | Total | | Division 1 | | F.A. Cup | |
| No. | Pos | Nat | Player | Apps | Goals | Apps | Goals | Apps | Goals |
|---|---|---|---|---|---|---|---|---|---|
| | MF | (England) ENG | Jack Cox | 29 | 5 | 25 | 4 | 4 | 1 |
| | DF | (Scotland) SCO | Billy Dunlop | 38 | 0 | 34 | 0 | 4 | 0 |
| | FW | (England) ENG | Abe Foxall | 1 | 0 | 1 | 0 | 0 | 0 |
| | DF | (Scotland) SCO | Archie Goldie | 25 | 0 | 21 | 0 | 4 | 0 |
| | DF | (Scotland) SCO | Billy Goldie | 29 | 1 | 25 | 1 | 4 | 0 |
| | DF | (England) ENG | Rabbi Howell | 28 | 0 | 26 | 0 | 2 | 0 |
| | DF | (Scotland) SCO | Thomas Hunter | 1 | 0 | 1 | 0 | 0 | 0 |
| | FW | (Scotland) SCO | John Hunter | 24 | 7 | 20 | 6 | 4 | 1 |
| | FW | (Scotland) SCO | Peter Kyle | 5 | 0 | 4 | 0 | 1 | 0 |
| | FW | (Scotland) SCO | Hugh Morgan | 26 | 3 | 23 | 3 | 3 | 0 |
| | FW | (England) ENG | Jack Parkinson | 1 | 0 | 1 | 0 | 0 | 0 |
| | GK | (England) ENG | Bill Perkins | 27 | 0 | 23 | 0 | 4 | 0 |
| | DF | (Scotland) SCO | Alex Raisbeck | 36 | 4 | 32 | 4 | 4 | 0 |
| | FW | (England) ENG | Sam Raybould | 11 | 7 | 11 | 7 | 0 | 0 |
| | MF | (Scotland) SCO | Tommy Robertson | 38 | 10 | 34 | 9 | 4 | 1 |
| | FW | (England) ENG | Charlie Satterthwaite | 18 | 5 | 18 | 5 | 0 | 0 |
| | DF | (England) ENG | General Stevenson | 13 | 0 | 13 | 0 | 0 | 0 |
| | GK | (England) ENG | Harry Storer | 11 | 0 | 11 | 0 | 0 | 0 |
| | FW | (Scotland) SCO | John Walker | 31 | 10 | 27 | 10 | 4 | 0 |
| | DF | (England) ENG | Charlie Wilson | 26 | 0 | 22 | 0 | 4 | 0 |
| | MF | (England) ENG | David Wilson | 2 | 0 | 2 | 0 | 0 | 0 |

== Table ==
| Pos | Team | Pld | W | D | L | GF | GA | GAv | Pts |
|---|---|---|---|---|---|---|---|---|---|
| 8 | Nottingham Forest | 34 | 13 | 8 | 13 | 56 | 55 | 1.018 | 34 |
| 9 | Stoke | 34 | 13 | 8 | 13 | 37 | 45 | 0.822 | 34 |
| 10 | Liverpool | 34 | 14 | 5 | 15 | 49 | 45 | 1.089 | 33 |
| 11 | Everton | 34 | 13 | 7 | 14 | 47 | 49 | 0.959 | 33 |
| 12 | Bury | 34 | 13 | 6 | 15 | 40 | 44 | 0.909 | 32 |

Source: World Football
Rules for classification: 1) Points; 2) Goal average; 3) Goals scored

== Pre-season and friendlies ==
| 4 September 1899 | Rangers | 2–2 | Liverpool | Glasgow |
| | Goal | Report | Kyle; Hunter | Stadium: Ibrox Stadium; Attendance: 5,000; Referee: T. Robertson |

| 25 September 1899 | Queen's Park | 2–0 | Liverpool | Glasgow |
| | Goal | Report | | Stadium: Hampden Park; Attendance: 4,000 |

| 26 December 1899 | Liverpool | 3–2 | Rangers | Liverpool |
| | Morgan; Robertson; Goldie | Report | Goal | Stadium: Anfield; Attendance: Unknown |

| 13 April 1900 | Everton | 3–1 | Liverpool | Liverpool |
| | Goal | Report | Robertson | Stadium: Goodison Park; Attendance: Unknown |

| 16 April 1900 | Liverpool | 4–2 | Queen's Park | Liverpool |
| | Raybould; Ferrier; Walker | Report | Goal | Stadium: Anfield; Attendance: 4,000 |

== Testimonials ==
| 18 September 1899 | Liverpool | 2–0 | New Brighton Tower | Liverpool |
| | Wilson | Report | | Stadium: Anfield; Attendance: Unknown |
Note: Testimonial for: Billy Dunlop

| 17 February 1900 | Blackpool | 2–2 | Liverpool | Blackpool |
| | Goal | Report | Wilson; Unknown | Stadium: Bloomfield Road; Attendance: Unknown |
Note: Testimonial for: Harry Stirzaker

== Competitions ==
=== League Division 1 ===
| 2 September 1899 1 | Stoke | 3–2 | Liverpool | Stoke-on-Trent |
| | Maxwell; Kennedy | Report | Raisbeck; Hunter | Stadium: Victoria Ground; Attendance: 8,000 |

| 9 September 1899 2 | Liverpool | 0–2 | Sunderland | Liverpool |
| | | Report | McLatchie 20'; Farquhar 22' | Stadium: Anfield; Attendance: 20,000 |

| 16 September 1899 3 | West Bromwich Albion | 2–0 | Liverpool | West Bromwich |
| | Garfield | Report | | Stadium: Stoney Lane; Attendance: 8,000 |

| 23 September 1899 4 | Liverpool | 1–2 | Everton | Liverpool |
| | Robertson | Report | Taylor; Settle | Stadium: Anfield; Attendance: 30,000 |

| 30 September 1899 5 | Blackburn Rovers | 2–0 | Liverpool | Blackburn |
| | Crook; Haworth | Report | | Stadium: Ewood Park; Attendance: 6,000 |

| 5 October 1899 6 | Notts County | 2–1 | Liverpool | Nottingham |
| | Goss 47'; Maconnachie 70' (pen.) | Report | Raisbeck | Stadium: Meadow Lane; Attendance: 10,000; Referee: J. Fox |

| 7 October 1899 7 | Liverpool | 0–2 | Derby County | Liverpool |
| | | Report | Bloomer 40', 50' | Stadium: Anfield; Attendance: 12,000 |

| 14 October 1899 8 | Bury | 2–1 | Liverpool | Bury |
| | Wood; McLuckie | Report | Walker | Stadium: Gigg Lane; Attendance: 4,000 |

| 21 October 1899 9 | Liverpool | 3–1 | Notts County | Liverpool |
| | Robertson; Raisbeck; Walker | Report | Ball | Stadium: Anfield; Attendance: 10,000 |

| 28 October 1899 10 | Manchester City | 0–1 | Liverpool | Manchester |
| | | Report | Robertson 60' | Stadium: Hyde Road; Attendance: 20,000 |

| 4 November 1899 11 | Liverpool | 2–2 | Sheffield United | Liverpool |
| | Hunter; Robertson | Report | Beer; Hedley | Stadium: Anfield; Attendance: 20,000 |

| 11 November 1899 12 | Newcastle United | 1–1 | Liverpool | Newcastle upon Tyne |
| | MacFarlane 40' | Report | Walker 12' | Stadium: St James' Park; Attendance: 10,000 |

| 18 November 1899 13 | Liverpool | 3–3 | Aston Villa | Liverpool |
| | Morgan 15'; Walker 31'; Raisbeck 52' | Report | Storer 30' (o.g.); Devey 40'; Wilkes 70' | Stadium: Anfield; Attendance: 15,000 |

| 25 November 1899 14 | Liverpool | 1–1 | Wolverhampton Wanderers | Liverpool |
| | Walker 55' | Report | Worton 20' | Stadium: Anfield; Attendance: 7,000 |

| 2 December 1899 15 | Burnley | 2–1 | Liverpool | Burnley |
| | Bowes 49'; Miller 70' | Report | Walker 72' | Stadium: Turf Moor; Attendance: 5,000 |

| 9 December 1899 16 | Liverpool | 1–0 | Preston North End | Liverpool |
| | Walker 12' | Report | | Stadium: Anfield; Attendance: 5,500 |

| 16 December 1899 17 | Nottingham Forest | 1–0 | Liverpool | Nottingham |
| | Capes 85' | Report | | Stadium: City Ground |

| 23 December 1899 18 | Liverpool | 5–2 | Glossop | Liverpool |
| | Hunter; Satterthwaite | Report | Evans | Stadium: Anfield; Attendance: 5,000 |

| 25 December 1899 19 | Derby County | 3–2 | Liverpool | Derby |
| | MacDonald; Bloomer; Crump | Report | Hunter; Robertson | Stadium: Baseball Ground; Attendance: 11,000 |

| 30 December 1899 20 | Liverpool | 0–0 | Stoke | Liverpool |
| | | Report | | Stadium: Anfield; Attendance: 6,000 |

| 6 January 1900 21 | Sunderland | 1–0 | Liverpool | Sunderland |
| | Raisbeck 70' | Report | | Stadium: Roker Park; Attendance: 2,000 |

| 13 January 1900 22 | Liverpool | 2–0 | West Bromwich Albion | Liverpool |
| | Morgan 12', 75' | Report | | Stadium: Anfield; Attendance: 8,000 |

| 20 January 1900 23 | Everton | 3–1 | Liverpool | Liverpool |
| | Blythe 68'; Settle 70', 73' | Report | Raybould 1' | Stadium: Goodison Park; Attendance: 35,000 |

| 3 February 1900 24 | Liverpool | 3–1 | Blackburn Rovers | Liverpool |
| | Cox; Robertson | Report | Blackburn | Stadium: Anfield; Attendance: 9,000 |

| 3 March 1900 25 | Liverpool | 5–2 | Manchester City | Liverpool |
| | Walker; Raybould (pen.); Satterthwaite; Cox | Report | Meredith; Gillespie | Stadium: Anfield; Attendance: 14,000 |

| 10 March 1900 26 | Sheffield United | 1–2 | Liverpool | Sheffield |
| | Hedley 42' (pen.) | Report | Raybould 7'; Satterthwaite 20' | Stadium: Bramall Lane; Attendance: 14,000 |

| 17 March 1900 27 | Liverpool | 2–0 | Newcastle United | Liverpool |
| | Robertson; Walker | Report | | Stadium: Anfield; Attendance: 10,000 |

| 24 March 1900 28 | Aston Villa | 1–0 | Liverpool | Aston |
| | Devey 55' | Report | | Stadium: Villa Park; Attendance: 12,000 |

| 31 March 1900 29 | Wolverhampton Wanderers | 0–1 | Liverpool | Wolverhampton |
| | | Report | Robertson 52' | Stadium: Molineux Stadium; Attendance: 7,000 |

| 7 April 1900 30 | Liverpool | 0–1 | Burnley | Liverpool |
| | | Report | Hartley 20' | Stadium: Anfield; Attendance: 6,000 |

| 9 April 1900 31 | Liverpool | 2–0 | Bury | Liverpool |
| | Raybould 35', 75' | Report | | Stadium: Anfield; Attendance: 5,000 |

| 14 April 1900 32 | Preston North End | 1–3 | Liverpool | Preston |
| | Henderson (pen.) | Report | Satterthwaite 55'; Raybould 60'; Cox 75' | Stadium: Deepdale; Attendance: 5,000 |

| 21 April 1900 33 | Liverpool | 1–0 | Nottingham Forest | Liverpool |
| | Robertson 75' (pen.) | Report | | Stadium: Anfield; Attendance: 10,000; Referee: J. Fox |

| 28 April 1900 34 | Glossop | 1–2 | Liverpool | Glossop |
| | Colville 89' | Report | Goldie 20'; Walker 22' | Stadium: North Road; Attendance: 2,000 |

=== F.A. Cup ===
| 27 January 1900 3 | Stoke City | 0–0 | Liverpool | Stoke-on-Trent |
| | | Report | | Stadium: Victoria Ground; Attendance: 8,500 |

| 1 February 1900 3 | Liverpool | 1–0 | Stoke City | Liverpool |
| | Hunter 8' | Report | | Stadium: Anfield; Attendance: 10,000 |

| 17 February 1900 4 | Liverpool | 1–1 | West Bromwich Albion | Liverpool |
| | Cox 12' | Report | Simmons 50' | Stadium: Anfield; Attendance: 15,000 |

| 21 February 1900 5 | West Bromwich Albion | 2–1 | Liverpool | West Bromwich |
| | Dunn 50'; Chadburn 54' | Report | Robertson 46' | Stadium: The Hawthorns; Attendance: 13,000 |

=== Lancashire Senior Cup ===
| 18 December 1899 | Preston North End | 2–0 | Liverpool | Preston |
| | Goal | Report | | Stadium: Deepdale; Attendance: Unknown |
