= 1898–99 Liverpool F.C. season =

English football club season

Liverpool
1898–99 season
- Manager: Tom Watson
- First Division: 2nd
- FA Cup: Semi-finals
- Top goalscorer: League: Hugh Morgan & Tommy Robertson (10); All: Hugh Morgan (13)
- Average home league attendance: 14,684 (League)
Home colours

The 1898-99 season was the seventh season in Liverpool F.C.'s existence, and was their sixth year in The Football League, in which they competed in the first division. The season covers the period from 1 July 1898 to 30 June 1899.

== Squad statistics ==
=== Appearances and goals ===
No.	Pos	Nat	Player	Total		Division 1		F.A. Cup	
No.	Pos	Nat	Player	Apps	Goals	Apps	Goals	Apps	Goals
	FW	(Scotland) SCO	George Allan	36	11	30	8	6	3
	DF	(Scotland) SCO	Tom Cleghorn	6	0	6	0	0	0
	MF	(England) ENG	Jack Cox	33	6	27	4	6	2
	DF	(Scotland) SCO	Billy Dunlop	38	0	32	0	6	0
	FW	(England) ENG	Fred Geary	1	0	1	0	0	0
	DF	(Scotland) SCO	Archie Goldie	31	0	26	0	5	0
	DF	(Scotland) SCO	Billy Goldie	33	2	27	2	6	0
	DF	(England) ENG	Rabbi Howell	36	0	30	0	6	0
	MF	(Scotland) SCO	Bobby Marshall	3	0	3	0	0	0
	FW	(Scotland) SCO	Andy McCowie	12	5	12	5	0	0
	GK	(Scotland) SCO	Matt McQueen	3	0	2	0	1	0
	FW	(Scotland) SCO	Hugh Morgan	38	13	32	10	6	3
	GK	(England) ENG	Bill Perkins	5	0	5	0	0	0
	DF	(Scotland) SCO	Alex Raisbeck	38	2	32	1	6	1
	MF	(Scotland) SCO	Tommy Robertson	39	11	33	10	6	1
	DF	(England) ENG	General Stevenson	9	0	8	0	1	0
	GK	(England) ENG	Harry Storer	32	0	27	0	5	0
	FW	(Scotland) SCO	John Walker	38	9	32	8	6	1
	DF	(Scotland) SCO	Tom Wilkie	2	0	2	0	0	0
	DF	(England) ENG	Charlie Wilson	7	0	7	0	0	0

== Table ==
Pos	Team	Pld	W	D	L	GF	GA	GAv	Pts
1	Aston Villa (C)	34	19	7	8	76	40	1.900	45
2	Liverpool	34	19	5	10	49	33	1.485	43
3	Burnley	34	15	9	10	45	47	0.957	39
4	Everton	34	15	8	11	48	41	1.171	38
5	Notts County	34	12	13	9	47	51	0.922	37

Source: World Football
Rules for classification: 1) Points; 2) Goal average; 3) Goals scored
(C) Champions

== Competitions ==
=== League Division 1 ===
3 September 1898 1	Liverpool	4–0	The Wednesday	Liverpool
	Robertson; Morgan; Goldie	Report		Stadium: Anfield; Attendance: 20,000

10 September 1898 2	Sunderland	1–0	Liverpool	Sunderland
	Leslie 84'	Report		Stadium: Roker Park; Attendance: 30,000

17 September 1898 3	Liverpool	1–0	Wolverhampton Wanderers	Liverpool
	Cox 30'	Report		Stadium: Anfield; Attendance: 20,000

24 September 1898 4	Everton	1–2	Liverpool	Liverpool
	Proudfoot	Report	McCowie (pen.)	Stadium: Goodison Park; Attendance: 40,000

1 October 1898 5	Liverpool	0–0	Notts County	Liverpool
		Report		Stadium: Anfield; Attendance: 15,000

8 October 1898 6	Stoke	2–1	Liverpool	Stoke-on-Trent
	Murphy 20'; Turner 21'	Report	Cox 6'	Stadium: Victoria Ground; Attendance: 10,000

15 October 1898 7	Liverpool	0–3	Aston Villa	Liverpool
		Report	Johnson 10'; Devey 15'; Wheldon 47'	Stadium: Anfield; Attendance: 20,000

22 October 1898 8	Burnley	2–1	Liverpool	Burnley
	Toman 30'; Place 50'	Report	Morgan	Stadium: Turf Moor; Attendance: 3,000

29 October 1898 9	Liverpool	2–1	Sheffield United	Liverpool
	McCowie (pen.); Allan	Report	Bennett	Stadium: Anfield; Attendance: 10,000

5 November 1898 10	Newcastle United	3–0	Liverpool	Newcastle upon Tyne
	Peddie; MacFarlane	Report		Stadium: St James' Park; Attendance: 22,000

12 November 1898 11	Liverpool	3–1	Preston North End	Liverpool
	Morgan; Allan	Report	Chalmers	Stadium: Anfield; Attendance: 10,000

19 November 1898 12	Bury	3–0	Liverpool	Bury
	Settle; Kelly	Report		Stadium: Gigg Lane; Attendance: 6,000

26 November 1898 13	Nottingham Forest	0–3	Liverpool	Nottingham
		Report	Morgan; McCowie; Walker	Stadium: City Ground; Attendance: 12,000

3 December 1898 14	Liverpool	2–0	Bolton Wanderers	Liverpool
	McCowie; Morgan	Report		Stadium: Anfield; Attendance: 10,000

10 December 1898 15	Derby County	1–0	Liverpool	Derby
	Bloomer 35'	Report		Stadium: Baseball Ground; Attendance: 8,000

17 December 1898 16	Liverpool	2–2	West Bromwich Albion	Liverpool
	Morgan; Walker	Report	Nock	Stadium: Anfield; Attendance: 8,000

24 December 1898 17	Blackburn Rovers	1–3	Liverpool	Blackburn
	Jackson	Report	Robertson	Stadium: Ewood Park; Attendance: 6,000

26 December 1898 18	West Bromwich Albion	0–1	Liverpool	West Bromwich
		Report	Morgan 28'	Stadium: Stoney Lane; Attendance: 8,483

27 December 1898 19	Notts County	1–1	Liverpool	Nottingham
	Fletcher 51' (pen.)	Report	Allan 55'	Stadium: Trent Bridge; Attendance: 16,000

31 December 1898 20	The Wednesday	0–3	Liverpool	Sheffield
		Report	Massey 11' (o.g.); Walker 50'; Allan 87' (pen.)	Stadium: Olive Grove; Attendance: 3,000

2 January 1899 21	Sheffield United	0–2	Liverpool	Sheffield
		Report	Walker 68'; Cox 70'	Stadium: Bramall Lane; Attendance: 11,500

7 January 1899 22	Liverpool	0–0	Sunderland	Liverpool
		Report		Stadium: Anfield; Attendance: 20,000

14 January 1899 23	Wolverhampton Wanderers	0–0	Liverpool	Wolverhampton
		Report		Stadium: Molineux Stadium; Attendance: 6,000

21 January 1899 24	Liverpool	2–0	Everton	Liverpool
	Walker 12'; Robertson 90'	Report		Stadium: Anfield; Attendance: 30,000

4 February 1899 25	Liverpool	1–0	Stoke	Liverpool
	Goldie	Report		Stadium: Anfield; Attendance: 9,000

18 February 1899 26	Liverpool	2–0	Burnley	Liverpool
	Robertson; Allan	Report		Stadium: Anfield; Attendance: 10,000

11 March 1899 27	Preston North End	1–2	Liverpool	Preston
	Pratt	Report	Morgan; Allan	Stadium: Deepdale; Attendance: 9,000

25 March 1899 28	Liverpool	0–1	Nottingham Forest	Liverpool
		Report	Benbow 75'	Stadium: Anfield; Attendance: 10,000

1 April 1899 29	Bolton Wanderers	2–1	Liverpool	Bolton
	McAteer; Morgan	Report	Morgan	Stadium: Burnden Park; Attendance: 12,000

3 April 1899 30	Liverpool	3–2	Newcastle United	Liverpool
	Walker; Cox; Allan	Report	Stevenson (pen.); Higgins	Stadium: Anfield; Attendance: 12,000

8 April 1899 31	Liverpool	4–0	Derby County	Liverpool
	Raisbeck; Walker; Robertson	Report		Stadium: Anfield; Attendance: 10,000

20 April 1899 32	Liverpool	1–0	Bury	Liverpool
	Walker 65'	Report		Stadium: Anfield; Attendance: 10,000

22 April 1899 33	Liverpool	2–0	Blackburn Rovers	Liverpool
	Allan 17'; Robertson 50'	Report		Stadium: Anfield; Attendance: 15,000

29 April 1899 34	Aston Villa	5–0	Liverpool	Birmingham
	Crabtree; Devey; Wheldon	Report		Stadium: Villa Park; Attendance: 41,000

=== F.A. Cup ===
28 January 1899 1	Liverpool	2–0	Blackburn Rovers	Liverpool
	Cox 37'; Allan 87'	Report		Stadium: Anfield; Attendance: 14,000

11 February 1899 2	Liverpool	3–1	Newcastle United	Liverpool
	Morgan 5'; Raisbeck 50'; Higgins 60' (o.g.)	Report	Peddie 75'	Stadium: Anfield; Attendance: 7,000

25 February 1899 QF	West Bromwich Albion	0–2	Liverpool	West Bromwich
		Report	Morgan 49'; Robertson 70'	Stadium: Stoney Lane; Attendance: 17,164

18 March 1899 SF	Sheffield United	2–2	Liverpool	Nottingham
	Hedley 10'; Needham 70'	Report	Allan 14'; Morgan 30'	Stadium: City Ground; Attendance: 21,000; Referee: A. Kingscott

23 March 1899 SF	Liverpool	4–4	Sheffield United	Bolton
	Walker 20'; Allan 50'; Boyle 70' (o.g.); Cox 72'	Report	Beer 54'; Bennett 65'; Priest 84', 85'	Stadium: Burnden Park; Attendance: 20,000; Referee: A. Kingscott

27 March 1899 SF	Sheffield United	0–1	Liverpool	Manchester
		Report	Allan 6'	Stadium: Fallowfield Stadium; Attendance: 30,000
Note: Abandoned due to crowd troubles.

30 March 1899 SF	Sheffield United	1–0	Liverpool	Derby
	Beer 85'	Report		Stadium: Baseball Ground; Attendance: 9,957; Referee: A. Kingscott

=== Lancashire Senior Cup ===
19 December 1898	Liverpool	1–1	Bury	Liverpool
	Allan 1' (pen.)	Report	Goal	Stadium: Anfield; Attendance: 2,844

10 January 1899	Bury	2–1	Liverpool	Bury
	Goal	Report	Allan	Stadium: Gigg Lane; Attendance: 2,172

== Testimonials ==
19 September 1898	Liverpool	3–2	Bolton Wanderers	Liverpool
	Morgan; Robertson	Report		Stadium: Anfield; Attendance: Unknown
Note: Testimonial for: Tom Wilkie

6 March 1899	Liverpool	0–1	Manchester City	Liverpool
		Report	Goal	Stadium: Anfield; Attendance: 2,000
Note: Testimonial for: Archie Goldie

== Friendlies ==
5 September 1898	Rangers	0–3	Liverpool	Glasgow
		Report	Walker; Robertson	Stadium: Ibrox Stadium; Attendance: 6,000; Referee: W. McLeod

26 September 1898	Stockport County	0–1	Liverpool	Stockport
		Report	Becton 30'	Stadium: Nursery Inn; Attendance: 2,000

4 March 1899	Newcastle United	1–3	Liverpool	Newcastle upon Tyne
	Goal	Report	Allan	Stadium: St James' Park; Attendance: 4,000

15 April 1899	Celtic	2–0	Liverpool	Glasgow
	Goal	Report		Stadium: Parkhead Stadium; Attendance: 7,000

17 April 1899	Heart of Midlothian	3–2	Liverpool	Edinburgh
	Goal	Report	Walker; Robertson	Stadium: Tynecastle Stadium; Attendance: 10,000; Referee: Dean

27 April 1899	Buckley Town	1–0	Liverpool	Buckley
	Goal	Report		Stadium: Mill Lane; Attendance: 1,500
