= 1897–98 Liverpool F.C. season =

English football club season

Liverpool
1897–98 season
- Manager: Tom Watson
- First Division: 9th
- FA Cup: Third round
- Top goalscorer: League: Frank Becton (11); All: Frank Becton (13)
- Average home league attendance: 13,055 (League)
Home colours

The 1897–98 season was the 6th season of competitive football played by Liverpool and was their 5th season in The Football League, in which they competed in the first division. The season sporty covers the period from 1 July 1897 to 30 June 1898. After finishing in fifth place the previous season, Liverpool fell four spots to finish in ninth place at the end of the season with 28 points, 14 points behind the champions in Sheffield United.

== Squad statistics ==
=== Appearances and goals ===
| No. | Pos | Nat | Player | Total | | Division 1 | | F.A. Cup | |
| No. | Pos | Nat | Player | Apps | Goals | Apps | Goals | Apps | Goals |
|---|---|---|---|---|---|---|---|---|---|
| | DF | (Scotland) SCO | Barney Battles | 1 | 0 | 1 | 0 | 0 | 0 |
| | FW | (England) ENG | Frank Becton | 26 | 13 | 21 | 11 | 5 | 2 |
| | MF | (England) ENG | Harry Bradshaw | 26 | 6 | 23 | 5 | 3 | 1 |
| | DF | (Scotland) SCO | Tom Cleghorn | 35 | 0 | 30 | 0 | 5 | 0 |
| | MF | (Scotland) SCO | Bobby Colvin | 3 | 0 | 3 | 0 | 0 | 0 |
| | MF | (England) ENG | Jack Cox | 2 | 1 | 2 | 1 | 0 | 0 |
| | FW | (England) ENG | Dan Cunliffe | 18 | 7 | 14 | 6 | 4 | 1 |
| | DF | (Scotland) SCO | Billy Dunlop | 25 | 0 | 20 | 0 | 5 | 0 |
| | FW | (England) ENG | Pat Finnerhan | 8 | 1 | 5 | 1 | 3 | 0 |
| | FW | (England) ENG | Fred Geary | 11 | 1 | 11 | 1 | 0 | 0 |
| | DF | (Scotland) SCO | Archie Goldie | 32 | 0 | 28 | 0 | 4 | 0 |
| | DF | (Scotland) SCO | Billy Goldie | 4 | 0 | 4 | 0 | 0 | 0 |
| | FW | (Scotland) SCO | Abe Hartley | 12 | 1 | 7 | 1 | 5 | 0 |
| | DF | (England) ENG | Johnny Holmes | 12 | 0 | 12 | 0 | 0 | 0 |
| | DF | (England) ENG | Rabbi Howell | 1 | 0 | 1 | 0 | 0 | 0 |
| | MF | (England) ENG | Joe Lumsden | 8 | 2 | 6 | 2 | 2 | 0 |
| | MF | (Scotland) SCO | Bobby Marshall | 18 | 2 | 17 | 2 | 1 | 0 |
| | DF | (Scotland) SCO | John McCartney | 32 | 1 | 27 | 1 | 5 | 0 |
| | FW | (Scotland) SCO | Andy McCowie | 21 | 6 | 19 | 6 | 2 | 0 |
| | DF | (Scotland) SCO | Joe McQue | 19 | 3 | 14 | 2 | 5 | 1 |
| | GK | (Scotland) SCO | Matt McQueen | 2 | 0 | 2 | 0 | 0 | 0 |
| | FW | (Scotland) SCO | Hugh Morgan | 4 | 2 | 4 | 2 | 0 | 0 |
| | MF | (Scotland) SCO | Tommy Robertson | 3 | 2 | 3 | 2 | 0 | 0 |
| | GK | (England) ENG | Harry Storer | 35 | 0 | 30 | 0 | 5 | 0 |
| | FW | (Scotland) SCO | John Walker | 3 | 2 | 3 | 2 | 0 | 0 |
| | MF | (Scotland) SCO | William Walker | 12 | 2 | 12 | 2 | 0 | 0 |
| | DF | (Scotland) SCO | Tom Wilkie | 11 | 1 | 10 | 0 | 1 | 1 |
| | DF | (England) ENG | Charlie Wilson | 1 | 0 | 1 | 0 | 0 | 0 |

== Table ==
| Pos | Team | Pld | W | D | L | GF | GA | GAv | Pts |
|---|---|---|---|---|---|---|---|---|---|
| 7 | West Bromwich Albion | 30 | 11 | 10 | 9 | 44 | 45 | 0.978 | 32 |
| 8 | Nottingham Forest | 30 | 11 | 9 | 10 | 47 | 49 | 0.959 | 31 |
| 9 | Liverpool | 30 | 11 | 6 | 13 | 48 | 45 | 1.067 | 28 |
| 10 | Derby County | 30 | 11 | 6 | 13 | 57 | 61 | 0.934 | 28 |
| 11 | Bolton Wanderers | 30 | 11 | 4 | 15 | 28 | 41 | 0.683 | 26 |

Source: World Football
Rules for classification: 1) Points; 2) Goal average; 3) Goals scored

== Competitions ==
=== League Division 1 ===
| 4 September 1897 1 | Stoke | 2–2 | Liverpool | Stoke-on-Trent |
| | Hill; Maxwell | Report | Becton; Walker | Stadium: Victoria Ground; Attendance: 5,000 |

| 11 September 1897 2 | Liverpool | 0–0 | Preston North End | Liverpool |
| | | Report | | Stadium: Anfield; Attendance: 15,000 |

| 18 September 1897 3 | The Wednesday | 4–2 | Liverpool | Sheffield |
| | Earp (pen.); Kaye; Ferrier | Report | Becton; Walker | Stadium: Olive Grove; Attendance: 7,000 |

| 25 September 1897 4 | Liverpool | 3–1 | Everton | Liverpool |
| | McQue; Cunliffe; Becton | Report | Taylor | Stadium: Anfield; Attendance: 30,000 |

| 2 October 1897 5 | Preston North End | 1–1 | Liverpool | Preston |
| | Eccleston 3' | Report | Bradshaw 42' | Stadium: Deepdale; Attendance: 7,000 |

| 9 October 1897 6 | Liverpool | 4–0 | Stoke | Liverpool |
| | Becton; Cunliffe; Bradshaw | Report | | Stadium: Anfield; Attendance: 12,000 |

| 16 October 1897 7 | Everton | 3–0 | Liverpool | Liverpool |
| | Williams 5', 85'; Bell 65' | Report | | Stadium: Goodison Park; Attendance: 37,500 |

| 23 October 1897 8 | Liverpool | 4–2 | Derby County | Liverpool |
| | Marshall; Cunliffe; McQue | Report | Maconnachie; Bloomer | Stadium: Anfield; Attendance: 10,000 |

| 30 October 1897 9 | Aston Villa | 3–1 | Liverpool | Birmingham |
| | Wheldon; Devey; Athersmith | Report | Bradshaw | Stadium: Villa Park; Attendance: 20,000 |

| 6 November 1897 10 | Liverpool | 1–2 | Nottingham Forest | Liverpool |
| | Cunliffe | Report | Benbow; Richards | Stadium: Anfield; Attendance: 6,000 |

| 13 November 1897 11 | West Bromwich Albion | 2–1 | Liverpool | West Bromwich |
| | Jones; Williams | Report | Becton | Stadium: Stoney Lane; Attendance: 1,000 |

| 20 November 1897 12 | Liverpool | 1–0 | Wolverhampton Wanderers | Liverpool |
| | Finnerhan 89' | Report | | Stadium: Anfield; Attendance: 6,000 |

| 27 November 1897 13 | Nottingham Forest | 2–3 | Liverpool | Nottingham |
| | Richards; Benbow | Report | Lumsden; McCowie | Stadium: Town Ground; Attendance: 5,000 |

| 11 December 1897 14 | Wolverhampton Wanderers | 2–1 | Liverpool | Wolverhampton |
| | Harper; Beats | Report | Bradshaw | Stadium: Molineux Stadium; Attendance: 5,000 |

| 18 December 1897 15 | Liverpool | 0–1 | Blackburn Rovers | Liverpool |
| | | Report | Proudfoot 12' | Stadium: Anfield; Attendance: 5,000 |

| 25 December 1897 16 | Bolton Wanderers | 0–2 | Liverpool | Bolton |
| | | Report | McCowie; Cunliffe | Stadium: Burnden Park; Attendance: 8,000 |

| 27 December 1897 17 | Liverpool | 0–2 | Sunderland | Liverpool |
| | | Report | Cleghorn (o.g.); Brown | Stadium: Anfield; Attendance: 25,000 |

| 29 December 1897 18 | Sheffield United | 1–2 | Liverpool | Sheffield |
| | McKay | Report | Hartley; McCowie | Stadium: Bramall Lane; Attendance: 4,000 |

| 1 January 1898 19 | Liverpool | 1–1 | West Bromwich Albion | Liverpool |
| | McCartney | Report | Flewitt | Stadium: Anfield; Attendance: 10,000 |

| 8 January 1898 20 | Blackburn Rovers | 2–1 | Liverpool | Blackburn |
| | Campbell; Briercliffe | Report | Ball (o.g.) | Stadium: Ewood Park; Attendance: 6,000 |

| 22 January 1898 21 | Sunderland | 1–0 | Liverpool | Sunderland |
| | Leslie | Report | | Stadium: Newcastle Road; Attendance: 9,000 |

| 5 February 1898 22 | Liverpool | 0–4 | Sheffield United | Liverpool |
| | | Report | Logan; Cunningham; Johnson | Stadium: Anfield; Attendance: 15,000 |

| 12 March 1898 23 | Liverpool | 2–0 | Notts County | Liverpool |
| | Becton; Cox | Report | | Stadium: Anfield; Attendance: 9,000 |

| 19 March 1898 24 | Liverpool | 1–1 | Bolton Wanderers | Liverpool |
| | Bradshaw | Report | Gilligan | Stadium: Anfield; Attendance: 7,000 |

| 26 March 1898 25 | Bury | 0–2 | Liverpool | Bury |
| | | Report | Becton; McCowie | Stadium: Gigg Lane; Attendance: 1,500 |

| 31 March 1898 26 | Liverpool | 2–2 | Bury | Liverpool |
| | Geary; McCowie | Report | Brimblecombe | Stadium: Anfield; Attendance: 3,000 |

| 2 April 1898 27 | Notts County | 3–2 | Liverpool | Nottingham |
| | Boucher; Leonard | Report | Becton; McCowie | Stadium: Trent Bridge; Attendance: 8,000 |

| 11 April 1898 28 | Liverpool | 4–0 | The Wednesday | Liverpool |
| | Becton; Morgan; Robertson | Report | | Stadium: Anfield; Attendance: 9,000 |

| 12 April 1898 29 | Derby County | 3–1 | Liverpool | Derby |
| | Burton 20'; Boag 85', 89' | Report | Walker 35' | Stadium: Baseball Ground; Attendance: 4,000 |

| 16 April 1898 30 | Liverpool | 4–0 | Aston Villa | Liverpool |
| | Robertson 7'; Walker 40'; Morgan 44'; Becton 85' | Report | | Stadium: Anfield; Attendance: 20,000 |

=== F.A. Cup ===
| 29 January 1898 1 | Liverpool | 2–0 | Hucknall St Johns | Liverpool |
| | Becton 50' (pen.); McQue 65' | Report | | Stadium: Anfield; Attendance: 8,000; Referee: G.H. Dale |

| 12 February 1898 2 | Newton Heath | 0–0 | Liverpool | Clayton |
| | | Report | | Stadium: Bank Street; Attendance: 12,000 |

| 16 February 1898 2 | Liverpool | 2–1 | Newton Heath | Liverpool |
| | Wilkie 57'; Cunliffe 85' | Report | Collinson 35' | Stadium: Anfield; Attendance: 6,000 |

| 26 February 1898 QF | Derby County | 1–1 | Liverpool | Derby |
| | Stevenson | Report | Bradshaw | Stadium: Baseball Ground; Attendance: 15,000 |

| 2 March 1898 QF | Liverpool | 1–5 | Derby County | Liverpool |
| | Becton 44' (pen.) | Report | Bloomer; Boag | Stadium: Anfield; Attendance: 15,000 |

=== Lancashire Senior Cup ===
| 4 December 1897 | Manchester City | 3–1 | Liverpool | Manchester |
| | Goal | Report | Marshall 13' | Stadium: Hyde Road; Attendance: 8,000 |

=== Testimonials ===
| 6 September 1897 | Liverpool | 4–1 | New Brighton Tower | Liverpool |
| | Becton; Finnerhan 20'; Unknown | Report | Hammond | Stadium: Anfield; Attendance: 5,000; Referee: E. Ramsbottem |
Note: Testimonial for John McCartney

| 11 October 1897 | Bolton Wanderers | 4–2 | Liverpool | Bolton |
| | Goal | Report | Bradshaw; Unknown | Stadium: Burnden Park; Attendance: 500 |
Note: Testimonial for John Somerville

| 27 April 1898 | New Brighton Tower | 2–4 | Liverpool | New Brighton |
| | Goal | Report | Walker; Cunliffe; Bradshaw | Stadium: Tower Athletic Ground; Attendance: 3,000 |
Note: Benefit for the widow of fireman Shone, at New Brighton

=== Friendlies ===
| 1 September 1897 | Everton | 1–1 | Liverpool | Liverpool |
| | Meehan | Report | Meehan (o.g.) | Stadium: Goodison Park; Attendance: 4,000; Referee: J. Lewis |

| 15 September 1897 | Burton Swifts | 3–2 | Liverpool | Burton upon Trent |
| | Goal | Report | McCowie; McQue 30' | Stadium: Peel Croft; Attendance: 2,000 |
Note: Benefit for the Bass Charity Association

| 20 September 1897 | Liverpool | 3–1 | Bolton Wanderers | Liverpool |
| | Cunliffe; McCartney | Report | Goal | Stadium: Anfield; Attendance: Unknown |

| 3 January 1898 | Heart of Midlothian | 3–1 | Liverpool | Edinburgh |
| | Goal | Report | Cleghorn | Stadium: Tynecastle Park; Attendance: 2,000 |

| 4 January 1898 | St Mirren | 3–1 | Liverpool | Paisley |
| | Goal | Report | McCowie | Stadium: St Mirren Park; Attendance: 1,000 |

| 12 January 1898 | Wigan County | 4–1 | Liverpool | Wigan |
| | Goal | Report | Cunliffe | Stadium: Springfield Park; Attendance: Unknown |

| 15 January 1898 | Liverpool | 2–5 | Corinthians | Liverpool |
| | McCowie | Report | Goal | Stadium: Anfield; Attendance: 6,000 |

| 19 February 1898 | Liverpool | 0–2 | Everton | Liverpool |
| | | Report | Goal | Stadium: Anfield; Attendance: 5,000 |

| 5 March 1898 | Corinthians | 3–0 | Liverpool | London |
| | Goal | Report | | Stadium: Queen's Club; Attendance: 3,000 |

| 8 April 1898 | Grimsby Town | 1–3 | Liverpool | Grimsby |
| | Goal | Report | Goal | Stadium: Abbey Park; Attendance: Unknown |

| 20 April 1898 | Chester | 1–3 | Liverpool | Chester |
| | | Report | Finnerhan; Bradshaw; Unknown (o.g.) | Stadium: Old Show Ground; Attendance: Unknown |

| 23 April 1898 | Liverpool | 0–2 | Heart of Midlothian | Liverpool |
| | | Report | Goal | Stadium: Anfield; Attendance: 2,000 |

| 30 April 1898 | Liverpool | 1–0 | Sheffield United | Liverpool |
| | Cunliffe 46' | Report | | Stadium: Anfield; Attendance: 500 |
