= 1902–03 Liverpool F.C. season =

English football club season

Liverpool F.C
1902–03 season
- Manager: Tom Watson
- Stadium: Anfield
- Football League: 5th
- FA Cup: First round
- Top goalscorer: League: Sam Raybould (31); All: Sam Raybould (32)

The 1902–03 Liverpool F.C. season was the 11th season in existence for Liverpool.

== Squad statistics ==
=== Appearances and goals ===
| No. | Pos | Nat | Player | Total | | Division 1 | | F.A. Cup | |
| No. | Pos | Nat | Player | Apps | Goals | Apps | Goals | Apps | Goals |
|---|---|---|---|---|---|---|---|---|---|
| | FW | (England) ENG | John Carlin | 1 | 0 | 1 | 0 | 0 | 0 |
| | FW | (England) ENG | Edgar Chadwick | 30 | 7 | 29 | 7 | 1 | 0 |
| | MF | (England) ENG | Jack Cox | 30 | 9 | 29 | 9 | 1 | 0 |
| | FW | (England) ENG | Jack Davies | 2 | 0 | 2 | 0 | 0 | 0 |
| | DF | (Scotland) SCO | Billy Dunlop | 29 | 0 | 28 | 0 | 1 | 0 |
| | MF | (Scotland) SCO | George Fleming | 4 | 0 | 4 | 0 | 0 | 0 |
| | DF | (England) ENG | John Glover | 31 | 0 | 30 | 0 | 1 | 0 |
| | MF | (England) ENG | Arthur Goddard | 34 | 11 | 33 | 11 | 1 | 0 |
| | DF | (Scotland) SCO | Billy Goldie | 35 | 1 | 34 | 1 | 1 | 0 |
| | MF | (England) ENG | Tommy Green | 3 | 1 | 3 | 1 | 0 | 0 |
| | FW | (Scotland) SCO | George Livingstone | 32 | 4 | 31 | 4 | 1 | 0 |
| | DF | (Scotland) SCO | Donald McCallum | 2 | 0 | 2 | 0 | 0 | 0 |
| | FW | (Wales) WAL | Dickie Morris | 11 | 0 | 11 | 0 | 0 | 0 |
| | MF | (Wales) WAL | Maurice Parry | 32 | 0 | 31 | 0 | 1 | 0 |
| | GK | (England) ENG | Bill Perkins | 13 | 0 | 12 | 0 | 1 | 0 |
| | GK | (England) ENG | Peter Platt | 22 | 0 | 22 | 0 | 0 | 0 |
| | DF | (Scotland) SCO | Alex Raisbeck | 28 | 1 | 27 | 1 | 1 | 0 |
| | FW | (England) ENG | Sam Raybould | 34 | 32 | 33 | 31 | 1 | 1 |
| | DF | (England) ENG | Charlie Wilson | 12 | 2 | 12 | 2 | 0 | 0 |

== Table ==
| Pos | Team | Pld | W | D | L | GF | GA | GAv | Pts |
|---|---|---|---|---|---|---|---|---|---|
| 3 | Sunderland | 34 | 16 | 9 | 9 | 51 | 36 | 1.417 | 41 |
| 4 | Sheffield United | 34 | 17 | 5 | 12 | 58 | 44 | 1.318 | 39 |
| 5 | Liverpool | 34 | 17 | 4 | 13 | 68 | 49 | 1.388 | 38 |
| 6 | Stoke | 34 | 15 | 7 | 12 | 46 | 38 | 1.211 | 37 |
| 7 | West Bromwich Albion | 34 | 16 | 4 | 14 | 54 | 53 | 1.019 | 36 |

Source: World Football
Rules for classification: 1) Points; 2) Goal average; 3) Goals scored

== Pre-season and friendlies ==
| 1 September 1902 | Liverpool | 1–1 | Celtic | Liverpool |
| | Cox | Report | Unknown | Stadium: Anfield; Attendance: 3,000; Referee: Unknown |

| 8 September 1902 | Liverpool | 1–3 | Hibernian | Liverpool |
| | Goddard | Report | Stewart; Reid | Stadium: Anfield; Attendance: 500; Referee: Unknown |

| 13 April 1903 | Bohemians | 2–5 | Liverpool | Dublin |
| | Unknown; Unknown | Report | Smith; Goldie; Cox; Chadwick; Goddard | Stadium: Dalymount Park; Attendance: 4,000; Referee: Unknown |

| 14 April 1903 | Distillery | 2–3 | Liverpool | Lisburn |
| | Unknown; Unknown | Report | Morris; Raybould; Livingstone | Stadium: Grosvenor Park; Attendance: 3,000; Referee: Unknown |

== Competitions ==
=== League Division 1 ===
| 6 September 1902 1 | Liverpool | 5–2 | Blackburn Rovers | Liverpool |
| | Cox; Raybould; Livingstone | Report | Whittaker | Stadium: Anfield; Attendance: 20,000; Referee: D. Hammond |

| 13 September 1902 2 | Sunderland | 2–1 | Liverpool | Sunderland |
| | Miller; Jackson | Report | Raybould (pen.) | Stadium: Roker Park; Attendance: 20,000; Referee: F.T. Kirkham |

| 20 September 1902 3 | Liverpool | 1–1 | Stoke | Liverpool |
| | Roose (o.g.) | Report | Forrest | Stadium: Anfield; Attendance: 20,000; Referee: J.W. Bailey |

| 27 September 1902 4 | Everton | 3–1 | Liverpool | Liverpool |
| | Young; Brearley; Abbott | Report | Raybould (pen.) | Stadium: Goodison Park; Attendance: 40,000; Referee: F.T. Kirkham |

| 4 October 1902 5 | Liverpool | 4–2 | The Wednesday | Liverpool |
| | Livingstone; Goddard; Raybould (pen.) | Report | Spiksley; Chapman | Stadium: Anfield; Attendance: 17,000; Referee: A.G. Kingscott |

| 11 October 1902 6 | West Bromwich Albion | 1–2 | Liverpool | West Bromwich |
| | McLean | Report | Raybould | Stadium: The Hawthorns; Attendance: 20,000; Referee: A.G. Kingscott |

| 18 October 1902 7 | Liverpool | 0–2 | Notts County | Liverpool |
| | | Report | Green; Ross | Stadium: Anfield; Attendance: 16,000; Referee: F. Bye |

| 25 October 1902 8 | Bolton Wanderers | 1–1 | Liverpool | Bolton |
| | Bell | Report | Raybould | Stadium: Burnden Park; Attendance: 8,000; Referee: T. Sutton |

| 1 November 1902 9 | Liverpool | 5–0 | Middlesbrough | Liverpool |
| | Raybould 2', 15', 53'; Chadwick 50'; Cox 67' | Report | | Stadium: Anfield; Attendance: 15,000; Referee: A.J. Barker |

| 8 November 1902 10 | Newcastle United | 1–2 | Liverpool | Newcastle upon Tyne |
| | Roberts | Report | Raybould; Goddard | Stadium: St James' Park; Attendance: 5,000; Referee: H. Boldison |

| 15 November 1902 11 | Liverpool | 4–1 | Wolverhampton Wanderers | Liverpool |
| | Cox; Raybould; Goddard; Livingstone | Report | Miller | Stadium: Anfield; Attendance: 15,000; Referee: D. Hammond |

| 22 November 1902 12 | Derby County | 2–1 | Liverpool | Derby |
| | Goodall; Richards | Report | Chadwick | Stadium: Baseball Ground; Attendance: 10,000; Referee: P.R. Harrower |

| 29 November 1902 13 | Sheffield United | 2–0 | Liverpool | Sheffield |
| | Winterhalder; Wilkinson | Report | | Stadium: Bramall Lane; Attendance: 7,000; Referee: J.Lewis |

| 6 December 1902 14 | Liverpool | 9–2 | Grimsby Town | Liverpool |
| | Goddard; Chadwick; Raybould (pen.); Livingstone | Report | Appleyard; Hogg | Stadium: Anfield; Attendance: 5,000; Referee: J. Adams |

| 13 December 1902 15 | Aston Villa | 1–2 | Liverpool | Aston |
| | Bache | Report | Raybould; Goddard | Stadium: Villa Park; Attendance: 20,000; Referee: J.Lewis |

| 20 December 1902 16 | Liverpool | 2–1 | Nottingham Forest | Liverpool |
| | Goddard; Cox | Report | Morris | Stadium: Anfield; Attendance: 16,000; Referee: F.T. Kirkham |

| 25 December 1902 17 | Liverpool | 5–1 | Bolton Wanderers | Liverpool |
| | Wilson; Cox; Chadwick; Raybould (pen.) | Report | Freebairn | Stadium: Anfield; Attendance: 20,000; Referee: Unknown |

| 27 December 1902 18 | Bury | 3–1 | Liverpool | Bury |
| | Sagar; Raisbeck (o.g.) | Report | Raybould | Stadium: Gigg Lane; Attendance: 11,000; Referee: F.T. Kirkham |

| 1 January 1903 19 | Liverpool | 0–2 | West Bromwich Albion | Liverpool |
| | | Report | Dorsett; Lee | Stadium: Anfield; Attendance: 25,000; Referee: Unknown |

| 3 January 1903 20 | Blackburn Rovers | 3–1 | Liverpool | Blackburn |
| | Whittaker; Monks; Bow | Report | Green | Stadium: Ewood Park; Attendance: 5,000; Referee: D.Hammond |

| 17 January 1903 21 | Stoke | 1–0 | Liverpool | Stoke-on-Trent |
| | Johnson | Report | | Stadium: Victoria Ground; Attendance: 5,000; Referee: J.W. Bailey |

| 31 January 1903 22 | The Wednesday | 3–1 | Liverpool | Sheffield |
| | Chapman (pen.); Davis | Report | Goddard | Stadium: Owlerton; Attendance: 15,000; Referee: A.G. Kingscott |

| 14 February 1903 23 | Notts County | 1–2 | Liverpool | Nottingham |
| | Bull | Report | Goddard | Stadium: Trent Bridge; Attendance: 7,000; Referee: F. Bye |

| 28 February 1903 24 | Middlesbrough | 0–2 | Liverpool | Middlesbrough |
| | | Report | Raybould 5'; Chadwick 87' | Stadium: Linthorpe Road; Attendance: 15,000; Referee: A.J. Barker |

| 7 March 1903 25 | Liverpool | 3–0 | Newcastle United | Liverpool |
| | Raisbeck; Raybould | Report | | Stadium: Anfield; Attendance: 15,000; Referee: H. Boldison |

| 23 March 1903 26 | Liverpool | 3–1 | Derby County | Liverpool |
| | Cox; Goldie; Raybould | Report | May | Stadium: Anfield; Attendance: 8,000; Referee: Unknown |

| 28 March 1903 27 | Liverpool | 2–4 | Sheffield United | Liverpool |
| | Cox; Raybould | Report | Brown; Lipsham; Needham (pen.) | Stadium: Anfield; Attendance: 15,000; Referee: J. Lewis |

| 30 March 1903 28 | Liverpool | 1–1 | Sunderland | Liverpool |
| | Raybould | Report | Hewitt | Stadium: Anfield; Attendance: 3,000; Referee: Unknown |

| 4 April 1903 29 | Grimsby Town | 3–1 | Liverpool | Cleethorpes |
| | Ronaldson; Rouse | Report | Chadwick | Stadium: Blundell Park; Attendance: 6,000; Referee: A. Hall |

| 10 April 1903 30 | Liverpool | 0–0 | Everton | Liverpool |
| | | Report | | Stadium: Anfield; Attendance: 28,000; Referee: J. Lewis |

| 11 April 1903 31 | Liverpool | 2–1 | Aston Villa | Liverpool |
| | Raybould; Goddard | Report | Garraty (pen.) | Stadium: Anfield; Attendance: 15,000; Referee: J. Lewis |

| 18 April 1903 32 | Nottingham Forest | 1–0 | Liverpool | Nottingham |
| | Spouncer | Report | | Stadium: City Ground; Attendance: 3,000; Referee: F.T. Kirkham |

| 25 April 1903 33 | Liverpool | 2–0 | Bury | Liverpool |
| | Raybould | Report | | Stadium: Anfield; Attendance: 10,000; Referee: F.T. Kirkham |

| 27 April 1903 34 | Wolverhampton Wanderers | 0–2 | Liverpool | Wolverhampton |
| | | Report | Cox; Raybould | Stadium: Molineux Stadium; Attendance: 8,000; Referee: Unknown |

=== F.A. Cup ===
| 7 February 1903 1 | Manchester United | 2–1 | Liverpool | Manchester |
| | Peddie 25', 40'; Stafford (red card) 65' | Report | Raybould 60' | Stadium: Bank Street; Attendance: 15,000; Referee: A. Millward |

=== Lancashire Senior Cup ===
| 29 September 1902 1 | Blackpool | 0–0 | Liverpool | Blackpool |
| | | Report | Raybould (penalty missed) | Stadium: Bloomfield Road; Attendance: 2,000; Referee: Unknown |

| 6 October 1902 1 | Liverpool | 3–3 | Blackpool | Liverpool |
| | Morris; Goldie; Cox | Report | Unknown; Unknown; Unknown | Stadium: Anfield; Attendance: Unknown; Referee: Unknown |

| 13 October 1902 1 | Blackpool | 1–1 | Liverpool | Manchester |
| | Unknown | Report | Raybould | Stadium: Hyde Road; Attendance: 1,000; Referee: Unknown |

| 20 October 1902 1 | Blackpool | 3–2 | Liverpool | Preston |
| | Unknown; Unknown; Unknown | Report | McGuigan 31'; Goddard 77' | Stadium: Deepdale; Attendance: 3,000; Referee: Unknown |
