= 1900–01 Liverpool F.C. season =

English football club season

Liverpool F.C
1900–01 season
- Manager: Tom Watson
- Stadium: Anfield
- Football League: 1st
- FA Cup: First round
- Top goalscorer: League: Sam Raybould (17); All: Sam Raybould (18)
Home colours	Away colours

The 1900–01 Liverpool F.C. season was the 9th season in existence and the 8th in the Football League for Liverpool, since their creation in 1892. They finished 1st in the league and were crowned Champions in the Football League, after winning a total of 19 matches. In the FA cup, they were knocked out in the first round, after the 0–2 loss to Notts County.

== Squad statistics ==
=== Appearances and goals ===
No.	Pos	Nat	Player	Total		Division 1		F.A. Cup	
No.	Pos	Nat	Player	Apps	Goals	Apps	Goals	Apps	Goals
	MF	(England) ENG	Jack Cox	34	10	32	10	2	0
	FW	(England) ENG	Jack Davies	1	0	1	0	0	0
	DF	(Scotland) SCO	Billy Dunlop	34	0	32	0	2	0
	DF	(England) ENG	John Glover	11	0	11	0	0	0
	DF	(Scotland) SCO	Billy Goldie	36	2	34	2	2	0
	DF	(England) ENG	Rabbi Howell	2	0	2	0	0	0
	DF	(Scotland) SCO	Thomas Hunter	2	0	2	0	0	0
	FW	(Scotland) SCO	John Hunter	9	3	8	3	1	0
	FW	(Scotland) SCO	Andy McGuigan	15	4	13	4	2	0
	MF	(Wales) WAL	Maurice Parry	8	0	8	0	0	0
	GK	(England) ENG	Bill Perkins	36	0	34	0	2	0
	DF	(Scotland) SCO	Alex Raisbeck	33	1	31	1	2	0
	FW	(England) ENG	Sam Raybould	33	18	31	17	2	1
	DF	(Scotland) SCO	Jack Robertson	27	0	25	0	2	0
	MF	(Scotland) SCO	Tommy Robertson	36	9	34	9	2	0
	FW	(England) ENG	Charlie Satterthwaite	22	5	22	5	0	0
	FW	(Scotland) SCO	John Walker	30	7	29	7	1	0
	DF	(England) ENG	Charlie Wilson	27	1	25	1	2	0

== Table ==
Pos	Team	Pld	W	D	L	GF	GA	GAv	Pts
1	Liverpool (C)	34	19	7	8	59	35	1.686	45
2	Sunderland	34	15	13	6	57	26	2.192	43
3	Notts County	34	18	4	12	54	46	1.174	40
4	Nottingham Forest	34	16	7	11	53	36	1.472	39
5	Bury	34	16	7	11	53	37	1.432	39

Source: World Football
Rules for classification: 1) Points; 2) Goal average; 3) Goals scored
(C) Champions

== Friendlies ==
17 September 1900	Liverpool	2–1	Stoke	Liverpool
	Hunter; Raybould (pen.)	Report	Goal	Stadium: Anfield; Attendance: Unknown; Referee: Unknown

26 December 1900	West Bromwich Albion	5–2	Liverpool	West Bromwich
	Goal	Report	Howell; Raybould	Stadium: The Hawthorns; Attendance: 10,000; Referee: Unknown

5 April 1901	Liverpool	2–1	Everton	Liverpool
	Satterthwaite; Raybould	Report	Goal	Stadium: Anfield; Attendance: 5,000; Referee: Unknown

6 April 1901	Manchester City	3–2	Liverpool	Manchester
	Goal	Report	Parry; Raybould	Stadium: Hyde Road; Attendance: Unknown; Referee: Unknown

9 April 1901	Cumberland	3–4	Liverpool	Cumberland
	Goal	Report	Cox; Raybould	Stadium: Borough Park; Attendance: 3,100; Referee: Unknown

== Testimonials ==
19 February 1901	Manchester City	0–8	Liverpool	Manchester
		Report	McGuigan; Satterthwaite; Davies; Hunter; Goldie	Stadium: Hyde Road; Attendance: Unknown; Referee: Unknown
Note: Testimonial for: Benefit for Thomas Herbert "Bert" Read.

== Competitions ==
=== League Division 1 ===
1 September 1900 1	Liverpool	3–0	Blackburn Rovers	Liverpool
	Robertson 10'; Satterthwaite 29'; Raybould 80'	Report		Stadium: Anfield; Attendance: 20,000; Referee: J. Stott

8 September 1900 2	Stoke	1–2	Liverpool	Stoke-on-Trent
	Maxwell 20'	Report	Robertson 44'; Raybould 86'	Stadium: Victoria Ground; Attendance: 10,000; Referee: J.C. Tillotson

15 September 1900 3	Liverpool	5–0	West Bromwich Albion	Liverpool
	Goldie 10'; Walker 20'; Raybould 50', 55'; Robertson 85'	Report		Stadium: Anfield; Attendance: 18,000; Referee: G.H. Dale

22 September 1900 4	Everton	1–1	Liverpool	Liverpool
	McDonald 30'	Report	Raybould 46'	Stadium: Goodison Park; Attendance: 44,324; Referee: A. Scragg

29 September 1900 5	Liverpool	1–2	Sunderland	Liverpool
	Wilson 55'	Report	Millar 40'; Hogg 89'	Stadium: Anfield; Attendance: 20,000; Referee: J.B. Brodie

6 October 1900 6	Derby County	2–3	Liverpool	Derby
	Goodall 15' (pen.); Boag 24'	Report	Robertson 23', 25'; Walker 30'	Stadium: Baseball Ground; Attendance: 8,000; Referee: G.B. Capes

13 October 1900 7	Liverpool	2–1	Bolton Wanderers	Liverpool
	Satterthwaite; Cox 40'	Report	Bell 31'	Stadium: Anfield; Attendance: 12,000; Referee: L.W. Furness

20 October 1900 8	Notts County	3–0	Liverpool	Nottingham
	Ross 30'; Morris 70'; Bull 75'	Report		Stadium: Trent Bridge; Attendance: 18,000; Referee: W.J.P. Whitsed

27 October 1900 9	Liverpool	3–2	Preston North End	Liverpool
	Walker; Cox 80'; Raybould 85'	Report	Raisbeck 1' (o.g.); Pierce 45'	Stadium: Anfield; Attendance: 12,000; Referee: T. Helme

3 November 1900 10	Wolverhampton Wanderers	2–1	Liverpool	Wolverhampton
	Bowen 65', 89'	Report	Walker 55'	Stadium: Molineux Stadium; Attendance: 12,000; Referee: A. Scragg

10 November 1900 11	Liverpool	5–1	Aston Villa	Liverpool
	Raybould 5', 63'; McGuigan 15'; Walker 25', 65'	Report	Johnson 70'	Stadium: Anfield; Attendance: 18,000; Referee: F. Bye

17 November 1900 12	The Wednesday	3–2	Liverpool	Sheffield
	Crawshaw 15'; Wilson 17', 33'	Report	Raybould 3'; Raisbeck 37'	Stadium: Owlerton Stadium; Attendance: 10,000; Referee: T. Helme

24 November 1900 13	Newcastle United	1–1	Liverpool	Newcastle upon Tyne
	Laidlaw 5'	Report	Cox 15'	Stadium: St James' Park; Attendance: 17,000; Referee: A.G. Kingscott

1 December 1900 14	Liverpool	1–2	Sheffield United	Liverpool
	Satterthwaite 55'	Report	Needham 22'; Gilhooly 65'	Stadium: Anfield; Attendance: 15,000; Referee: A. Green

8 December 1900 15	Manchester City	3–4	Liverpool	Manchester
	Smith 9'; Cassidy 15', 15'	Report	Cox; McGuigan; Raybould 10'; Robertson 46'	Stadium: Hyde Road; Attendance: 20,000; Referee: T. Helme

15 December 1900 16	Liverpool	1–0	Bury	Liverpool
	Cox 82'	Report		Stadium: Anfield; Attendance: 14,000; Referee: F.T. Kirkham

22 December 1900 17	Nottingham Forest	0–0	Liverpool	Nottingham
		Report		Stadium: City Ground; Attendance: 6,000; Referee: J. Adams

25 December 1900 18	Liverpool	0–0	Derby County	Liverpool
		Report		Stadium: Anfield; Attendance: 18,000; Referee: R. Roberts

29 December 1900 19	Blackburn Rovers	3–1	Liverpool	Blackburn
	Dewhurst 1', 23'; Whittaker 10'	Report	Raybould 45'	Stadium: Ewood Park; Attendance: 8,000; Referee: C.C. Fallowfield

1 January 1901 20	Liverpool	3–1	Stoke	Liverpool
	McGuigan; Robertson 15'; Cox 50'	Report	Higginson 20'	Stadium: Anfield; Attendance: 15,000; Referee: J. Adams
Note: Stoke goal showing as Tinker Whitehouse in LFC History website , but Sam Higginson in Matthews, Tony (1994). The Encyclopaedia of Stoke City. Lion Press. ISBN 0-9524151-0-0.

19 January 1901 21	Liverpool	1–2	Everton	Liverpool
	Cox 37'	Report	Taylor 18', 62'	Stadium: Anfield; Attendance: 18,000; Referee: A. Scragg

16 February 1901 22	Bolton Wanderers	1–0	Liverpool	Bolton
	Bell 35'	Report		Stadium: Burnden Park; Attendance: 8,000; Referee: A.J. Barker

23 February 1901 23	Sunderland	0–1	Liverpool	Sunderland
		Report	Cox 62'	Stadium: Roker Park; Attendance: 11,249; Referee: J.H. Strawson

2 March 1901 24	Preston North End	2–2	Liverpool	Preston
	Becton 44', 67'	Report	Satterthwaite 20'; Raybould 62'	Stadium: Deepdale; Attendance: 1,500; Referee: T. Helme

9 March 1901 25	Liverpool	1–0	Wolverhampton Wanderers	Liverpool
	Raybould 85'	Report		Stadium: Anfield; Attendance: 15,000; Referee: Ditchfield

16 March 1901 26	Aston Villa	0–2	Liverpool	Aston
		Report	McGuigan 30'; Hunter 90'	Stadium: Villa Park; Attendance: 14,000; Referee: A.G. Kingscott

23 March 1901 27	Liverpool	1–1	The Wednesday	Liverpool
	Raybould 40'	Report	Spiksley 54'	Stadium: Anfield; Attendance: 12,000; Referee: G.F. Allwood

30 March 1901 28	Liverpool	3–0	Newcastle United	Liverpool
	Hunter 25', 87'; Raybould 65'	Report		Stadium: Anfield; Attendance: 10,000; Referee: F.T. Kirkham

8 April 1901 29	Liverpool	1–0	Notts County	Liverpool
	Raybould 75'	Report		Stadium: Anfield; Attendance: 15,000; Referee: A. Green

13 April 1901 30	Liverpool	3–1	Manchester City	Liverpool
	Robertson 5', 45'; Cox 6'	Report	Meredith 82'	Stadium: Anfield; Attendance: 14,000; Referee: R. Horrocks

20 April 1901 31	Bury	0–0	Liverpool	Bury
		Report		Stadium: Gigg Lane; Attendance: 8,000; Referee: F.T. Kirkham

22 April 1901 32	Sheffield United	0–2	Liverpool	Sheffield
		Report	Raybould 17'; Satterthwaite 20'	Stadium: Bramall Lane; Attendance: 6,000; Referee: J.C. Tillotson

27 April 1901 33	Liverpool	2–0	Nottingham Forest	Liverpool
	Cox 25'; Goldie 55'	Report		Stadium: Anfield; Attendance: 20,000; Referee: T. Armitt

29 April 1901 34	West Bromwich Albion	0–1	Liverpool	West Bromwich
		Report	Walker 20'	Stadium: The Hawthorns; Attendance: 4,000; Referee: Baynton

=== F.A. Cup ===
5 January 1901 Intermediate Round	West Ham United	0–1	Liverpool	London
		Report	Raybould 60'	Stadium: Memorial Grounds; Attendance: 6,000; Referee: A. Green

9 February 1901 1	Notts County	2–0	Liverpool	Nottingham
	Morris 22', 75'	Report	Robertson (red card) 60'	Stadium: Trent Bridge; Attendance: 15,000; Referee: F.H. King

=== Lancashire Senior Cup ===
1 October 1900	Liverpool	0–2	Burnley	Liverpool
		Report	Goal	Stadium: Anfield; Attendance: Unknown; Referee: Unknown
