= Satterthwaite (disambiguation) =

Satterthwaite is a small village situated in Grizedale, a valley in the Lake District, England.

Satterthwaite can also refer to:

== People ==
- Amy Satterthwaite (born 1986), New Zealand cricketer
- Charlie Satterthwaite (1877–1948), English football player
- Helen F. Satterthwaite (born 1928), American politician
- John Satterthwaite (born 1925), Church of England bishop whose dioceses were located outside England
- Joe Satterthwaite (born 1885, date of death unknown), English footballer
- Joseph C. Satterthwaite (1900–1990), American politician
- Linton Satterthwaite (1897–1978), American archaeologist and epigrapher specialising in the Maya
- Mark Satterthwaite (born 1945), American economist
- Phyllis Satterthwaite, British tennis player

== Law Case ==
- New Zealand Shipping Co. Ltd. v. A. M. Satterthwaite & Co. Ltd. or The Eurymedon, is a leading case on contract law which clarifies when a third party may seek the protection of an exclusion clause in a contract between two parties.

== Mathematics ==
- The Gibbard–Satterthwaite theorem, is a result about voting systems.
- The Myerson–Satterthwaite theorem is an important result in mechanism design and the economics of asymmetric information.
- The Welch–Satterthwaite equation is an equation in statistics relating to the degrees of freedom of a linear combination of independent sample variances.
