= General Stevenson (disambiguation) =

General Stevenson (1875–1961) was an English footballer. General Stevenson may also refer to:

- Carter L. Stevenson (1817–1888), Confederate States Army major general
- James Stevenson (East India Company officer) (died 1805), British East India Company major general
- John D. Stevenson (United States Air Force general) (1914–1995), U.S. Air Force general
- John Dunlap Stevenson (1821–1897), Union Army brigadier general and brevet major general
- John Rowlstone Stevenson (1908–1971), Australian Army major general
- Mitchell H. Stevenson (born 1952), U.S. Army lieutenant general
- Nathaniel Stevenson (1840–1911), British Army general
- Thomas G. Stevenson (1836–1864), Union Army brigadier general
