= James Laidlaw =

James Laidlaw may refer to:

- James Laidlaw (anthropologist) (born 1963), British anthropologist
- James Laidlaw (politician) (1822–1905), Canadian politician
- James Lees Laidlaw (1868–1932), American banker and philanthropist
- Jimmy Laidlaw (1873–?), Scottish footballer
