= John Nock =

John Nock may refer to:

- John Nock (footballer, born 1875), English footballer
- John Nock (footballer, born 1909), English footballer
