= Joseph Satterthwaite =

Joseph Satterthwaite is the name of:

- Joe Satterthwaite (1885–?), English footballer
- Joseph C. Satterthwaite (1900–1990), American politician
