= Donald McCallum =

Donald McCallum may refer to:

- Donald McCallum (footballer, born 1880), Scottish footballer
- Donald McCallum (footballer, born 1996), Scottish footballer
- Donald McCallum (engineer) (1922–2011), Scottish radar engineer and industrialist
