= Tommy Green (footballer, born 1876) =

English footballer (1876–1958)

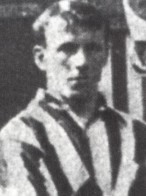
- Green, c. 1900s

Personal information
- Full name: Thomas Green
- Date of birth: 31 October 1876
- Place of birth: Bebington, England
- Date of death: 1958 (aged 81–82)
- Height: 5 ft 9 in (1.75 m)
- Position: Winger

Senior career*
Years	Team	Apps	(Gls)
1896–1897	Bromborough Pool		
1897–1899	Tranmere Rovers		
1899–1901	New Brighton Tower	7	(3)
1901–1903	Liverpool	7	(1)
1903–1904	Swindon Town	24	(2)
1904–1905	Stockport County	18	(12)
1905–1906	Middlesbrough	37	(9)
1906–1907	Queens Park Rangers	37	(8)
1907–1909	Stockport County	61	(12)
1909–1910	Exeter City	31	(8)
1910–1911	St Helens Town		
1911–1912	Rossendale United	46	(16)
1912–1913	Tranmere Rovers		
1913–1920	Borough of Wallasey		
1920–?	Port Sunlight		
Total		222	(55)
- * Club domestic league appearances and goals

Thomas Green (31 October 1876 – 1958) was an English footballer who played as a winger in the Football League for New Brighton Tower, Liverpool, Middlesbrough and Stockport County.

== Early life ==
Thomas Green was born on 31 October 1876 in Bebington, Cheshire.

== Career ==
Green started his career in non-League football with Bromborough Pool in 1896, before joining Tranmere Rovers the following year. He initially played in the reserve team before establishing himself in the first team towards the end of the 1897–98 season, with Tranmere finishing 12th of 14 in the Combination. The team improved their ranking in the 1898–99 Combination by finish third of 15, and Green's partnership with Jack Davies was described as "one of the most important factors in it" by the Birkenhead News.

Green signed for Second Division club New Brighton Tower in May 1899. He made his debut on 16 September in a 1–1 draw at home to Middlesbrough in the league, before scoring his first goal a week later in a 5–0 win at home to Birkenhead in the 1899–1900 FA Cup preliminary Round. He made five appearances and three goals in the 1899–1900 Second Division, in which New Brighton finished 10th of 18. Green made only two appearances in the 1900–01 Second Division, as New Brighton ranked in fourth place of 18. He requested that he be placed on the transfer list by New Brighton at the end of the season, although this was refused by a Football League committee, as they ruled that he had been offered a fair wage by the club.

Green signed for First Division club Liverpool in September 1901, but did not make his debut until 1 February 1902 in a 0–0 draw away to Bury in the league. He made three more appearances in the 1901–02 First Division, with Liverpool finishing 11th of 18. Green scored his only goal for Liverpool on 3 January 1903 in the second minute of his last appearance for the club, a 3–1 defeat away to Blackburn Rovers in the league. His opportunities in the team in the 1902–03 season were limited due to the form of Sam Raybould, and Green finished the 1902–03 First Division with three appearances and one goal, in which Liverpool ranked fifth of 18.

Green signed for Swindon Town in May 1903 and made his debut on 5 September in the first match of the 1903–04 Southern League Division One, a 2–0 defeat away to Bristol Rovers. Green scored his first goal for Swindon two days later in the opening five minutes of the team's next match, a 2–1 loss away to Brentford in the league. He was switched to outside right in November to accommodate the newly arrived Cornelius Hogan at centre forward – a correspondent to the Swindon Advertiser had suggested that his pace and cleverness made him better suited to that position, not believing him robust enough for centre-forward play; that newspaper reported that he needed to learn to cross on the run. Green was showing good form in that position, before an injury to his right knee that required specialist treatment in London was to restrict his senior appearances for the next few months. He spent February with Swindon's reserve team, and having finally returned to form, finished the season as a first-team regular. He made 24 league appearances and scored twice, as Swindon finished 10th of 18.

Green joined Lancashire Combination club Stockport County in 1904, following their failure to be re-elected into the Football League. He made his debut on 2 September in the first match of the 1904–05 Lancashire Combination, a 2–1 home win over Southport Central, in which he scored Stockport's opening goal. He established himself as a popular player with supporters and played regularly in the team at centre forward. Green signed for First Division club Middlesbrough on 8 February 1905 for a transfer fee of around £300, which Stockport agreed to reluctantly due to financial problems at the club. He had scored 12 goals in 18 appearances for Stockport by that point in the 1904–05 Lancashire Combination, which Stockport went on to finish as champions, ranking first of 18. He went straight into the Middlesbrough team, making his debut three days after signing in the place of Horace Astley in a 3–2 loss away to Manchester City in the league. He scored his first goals for Middlesbrough on 25 March, with a goal in each half of a 3–1 home win over Wolverhampton Wanderers. Green finished the 1904–05 First Division with three goals in 11 appearances, as Middlesbrough finished 15th of 18. He made 26 appearances and scored six goals in the 1905–06 First Division, in which Middlesbrough narrowly avoided relegation on goal average, ranking 18th of 20.

Green signed for Southern League Division One club Queens Park Rangers in May 1906. He made his debut on 1 September in their opening match of the 1906–07 Southern League Division One, a 1–1 draw away to Luton Town. Green assisted Ned Anderson's opening goal in the match, and the two were reported by The Sportsman to have "caught the eye for judicious work". Green scored his first goal on 17 November in the first half of a 5–0 home win over Northampton Town in the league. He finished the season with 8 goals in 37 appearances in the 1906–07 Southern League Division One, with QPR finishing 18th of 20. in which they finished 18th of 22.

Green rejoined Stockport County in June 1907, with the club now in the Second Division. He made his debut on 2 September in Stockport's 1–1 draw at home to Blackpool in the opening match of the 1907–08 Second Division. He scored Stockport's equalising goal late into the match, which was described as a "strong shot at 20 yards' range" by the Lancashire Daily Post. He continued to be popular with supporters in his second spell with Stockport, but this time regularly played outside right and had a less impressive scoring record. He finished the 1907–08 Second Division with seven goals in 30 appearances, with Stockport ranking 13th of 20. Green made 31 appearances and scored five goals in the 1908–09 Second Division, in which Stockport finished 18th of 20.

Green signed for Exeter City in July 1909, making his debut on 2 September in their opening match of the 1909–10 Southern League Division One, a 2–1 defeat at home to West Ham United. He scored his first goal on 6 November in a 1–1 draw at home to Watford in the league. Green made 31 appearances and scored 8 goals for Exeter in the 1909–10 Southern League Division One, in which they finished 18th of 22. He then had spells with St Helens Town, Rossendale United, Tranmere Rovers, Borough of Wallasey and Port Sunlight.

== Later life ==
Green died in 1958.

== Career statistics ==
Appearances and goals by club, season and competition
Club	Season	League			FA Cup		Total	
Club	Season	Division	Apps	Goals	Apps	Goals	Apps	Goals
New Brighton Tower	1899–1900	Second Division	5	3	2	1	7	4
New Brighton Tower	1900–01	Second Division	2	0	0	0	2	0
New Brighton Tower	Total		7	3	2	1	9	4
Liverpool	1901–02	First Division	4	0	0	0	4	0
Liverpool	1902–03	First Division	3	1	0	0	3	1
Liverpool	Total		7	1	0	0	7	1
Swindon Town	1903–04	Southern League Division One	24	2	3	2	27	4
Stockport County	1904–05	Lancashire Combination	18	12	5	4	23	16
Middlesbrough	1904–05	First Division	11	3	0	0	11	3
Middlesbrough	1905–06	First Division	26	6	5	0	31	6
Middlesbrough	Total		37	9	5	0	42	9
Queens Park Rangers	1906–07	Southern League Division One	37	8	2	0	39	8
Stockport County	1907–08	Second Division	30	7	1	0	31	7
Stockport County	1908–09	Second Division	31	5	3	0	34	5
Stockport County	Total		61	12	4	0	65	12
Exeter City	1909–10	Southern League Division One	31	8	4	0	35	8
Career total			222	55	25	7	247	62

== Honours ==
Stockport County

- Lancashire Combination: 1904–05
