= James Wilson (footballer, born 1882) =

Scottish footballer (1882–??)

Personal information
- Date of birth: 6 April 1882
- Place of birth: Colmonell, Scotland
- Position: Inside right

Senior career*
Years	Team	Apps	(Gls)
1898–1904	St Mirren	67	(12)
1904–1911	Preston North End	162	(32)

International career
1904	Scottish League XI	1	(0)
- * Club domestic league appearances and goals

James Wilson (born 6 April 1882) was a Scottish footballer who played for St Mirren and Preston North End, mainly as an inside right. While with St Mirren, he was selected once for the Scottish Football League XI, playing against the Irish League XI in 1904 a matter of weeks before he moved to England. He was a member of the Preston team which finished runners-up in the 1905–06 Football League, and was the club's top scorer in 1908–09. Wilson finished his career together with Jimmy McLean in summer 1911.

Born into a farming family in Colmonell and raised in Dundonald, South Ayrshire, James Wilson had two brothers who were also prominent footballers in England: Andrew was a forward with Sheffield Wednesday and David a wing half with Oldham Athletic (where a fourth brother, Alex, was also a reserve team member); both played for Scotland: Andrew gaining six caps, David one.
