= James Arnott (footballer) =

English footballer

Personal information
- Place of birth: England
- Position: Goalkeeper

Senior career*
Years	Team	Apps	(Gls)
1897–1900	Burnley	12	(0)
- * Club domestic league appearances and goals

James Arnott was an English professional footballer who played as a goalkeeper for Burnley in the late 1890s.

Arnott joined Football League Second Division side Burnley from local club Hapton in October 1897 and made his debut for the club on 7 March 1898 in the 6–3 win over Newton Heath at Turf Moor. The following season, he made eight league appearances as Burnley finished third in the First Division. He achieved his first senior clean sheet on 31 March 1899 in the 1–0 victory against Sheffield United. Arnott played his final match on 11 November 1899 in the 0–0 draw with Sheffield United, and left Burnley shortly afterwards.
