= William Bow =

Scottish footballer

Personal information
- Full name: William Bow
- Date of birth: 1878
- Place of birth: Falkirk, Scotland
- Date of death: 1929 (aged 50–51)
- Position: Inside forward

Senior career*
Years	Team	Apps	(Gls)
1900–1901	Broxburn		
1901–1902	St Bernard's		
1902–1904	Blackburn Rovers	20	(2)
1904–1905	Darwen		
1905–1907	Nelson		
1907–1908	Oswaldtwistle Rovers		
1908	Great Harwood		
Total		20	(2)
- * Club domestic league appearances and goals

William Bow (1878–1929) was a Scottish footballer who played in the Football League for Blackburn Rovers.
