= David A. Wilson =

English footballer

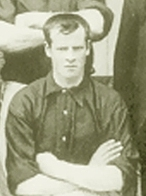

Personal information
- Date of birth: 1875
- Place of birth: England
- Position: Inside forward

Senior career*
Years	Team	Apps	(Gls)
1895–1899	East Benhar		
1899–1900	Liverpool	2	(0)
1900–1906	Airdrieonians	37	(13)
1906	Hamilton Academical	1	(0)
1906–1907	Albion Rovers	4	(0)
Total		44	(13)
- * Club domestic league appearances and goals

David A. Wilson (1875 – ?) was an English footballer who played as an inside forward in the Football League for Liverpool (from 1899 to 1900) and in Scottish football for Airdrieonians, Hamilton Academical and Albion Rovers. (Note: In the source, the record has been merged with that of another player of the same name who also had a short spell at Hamilton.)
