= John D. Stevenson (United States Air Force general) =

United States Air Force general

John D. Stevenson (July 3, 1914 – November 3, 1995) was a U.S. Air Force general.

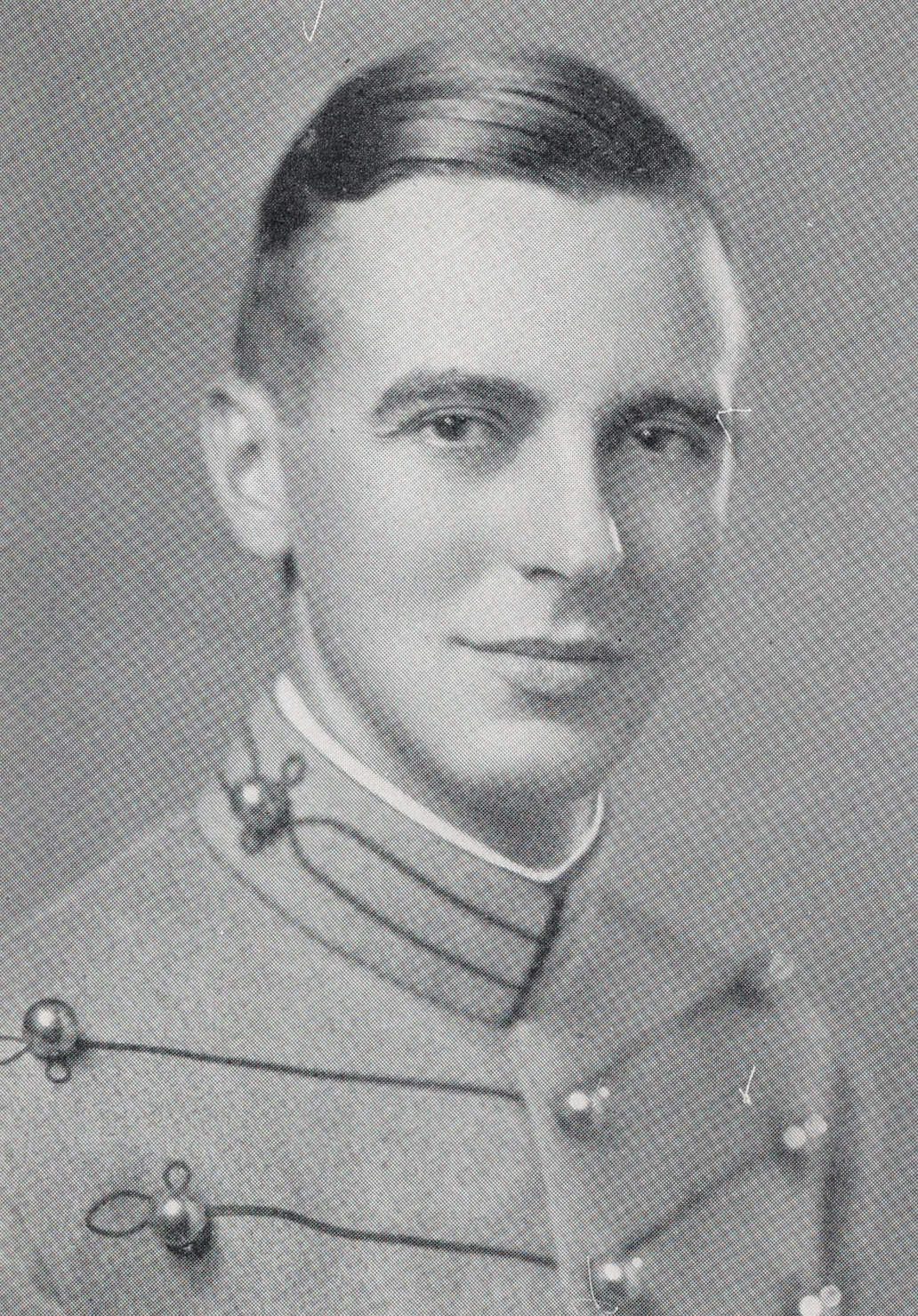
Stevenson as a West Point cadet c. 1937

A native of Laramie, Wyoming, he graduated from the United States Military Academy in 1937, ranked 15th in a class of 300. On graduation, he entered the Army Air Force Flying School, completing his training in October 1938.

He was serving in Puerto Rico in command of the 22nd Pursuit Squadron when Pearl Harbor was attacked. In June 1942, he was transferred to England where he served on the staff of General Eisenhower. In November 1942, he served in North Africa as a staff officer. In April 1943, he was named commander of the 27th Fighter Bomber Group. In August 1943, he was shot down and captured by the Germans. Following his return to the ZI in April 1945, he served as Assistant Chief of Staff; Operations; Tactical Air Command; IG for Airways and Air Communications Service; Chief of Plans Division for MATS; Chief Atomic Energy. He graduated from the Air War College in 1948. In February 1952, he was named commander of the newly activated 49th Air Division at Langley Air Force Base.

In 1966, he retired from the Air Force and became a NASA administrator. From 1967 until 1971, he was director of mission operations in the Office of Manned Space Flight.

His decorations include:

- Legion of Merit
- U.S. Distinguished Flying Cross
- Air Medal with two Oak Leaf Clusters
- Purple Heart with two Oak Leaf Clusters
- British Distinguished Flying Cross
