= Michael Kelly (footballer, born 1877) =

English footballer

Personal information
- Full name: Michael J. Kelly
- Date of birth: 1877
- Place of birth: Blackburn, England
- Date of death: Unknown
- Position: Winger

Senior career*
Years	Team	Apps	(Gls)
1895–1897	Clitheroe		
1897–1898	Ashton North End		
1898–1899	Bury	25	(7)
1899–1900	Reading		
1900–1901	Blackburn Rovers	3	(0)
1901–1902	Rossendale United	6	(3)
1902	Darwen		
1902	Padiham		
Total		28	(7)
- * Club domestic league appearances and goals

Michael J. Kelly (1877–unknown) was an English footballer who played in the Football League for Blackburn Rovers and Bury.
