= James Farquhar (footballer) =

Scottish footballer

James Farquhar (c. 1879 – ?) was a Scottish footballer who played for Sunderland as a half back.

== Club career ==
He made his Sunderland debut on 18 February 1899 against Sheffield Wednesday in a 1–0 win at Olive Grove. He was a part of the Sunderland team that won the 1902 English Football League Championship. Overall, at his time at the club, he made 188 league appearances scoring 18 goals.
