= Tommy Worton =

English footballer

Personal information
- Full name: Thomas Worton
- Date of birth: 1876
- Place of birth: Wolverhampton, England
- Position: Inside forward

Senior career*
Years	Team	Apps	(Gls)
1898–1901	Wolverhampton Wanderers	57	(12)
1901–1904	West Bromwich Albion	72	(23)
Total		129	(35)
- * Club domestic league appearances and goals

Thomas Worton (1876–unknown) was an English footballer who played in the Football League for West Bromwich Albion and Wolverhampton Wanderers.
