= Chippy Simmons =

English footballer

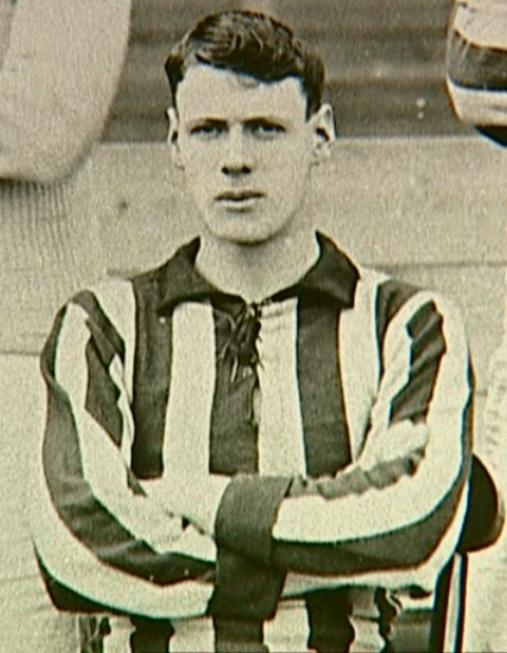

Personal information
- Full name: Charles Simmons
- Date of birth: 9 September 1878
- Place of birth: West Bromwich, England
- Date of death: 12 December 1937 (aged 59)
- Place of death: Wednesbury, England
- Position: Centre forward

Senior career*
Years	Team	Apps	(Gls)
- Trinity Victoria
- Oldbury Town
- Worcester Rovers
1898–1904	West Bromwich Albion	142	(57)
1904–1905	West Ham United	34	(8)
1905–1907	West Bromwich Albion	36	(18)
1907–1908	Chesterfield Town	32	(7)
- Wellington Town
- Royal Rovers (Canada)
- * Club domestic league appearances and goals

Charles "Chippy" Simmons (9 September 1878 – 12 December 1937) was an English footballer who played as a centre-forward.

He played in the Football League for West Bromwich Albion and Chesterfield Town.

== Biography ==
Simmons was born in West Bromwich and turned professional with West Bromwich Albion in April 1898. On 3 September 1900 Simmons became the first Albion player to score at The Hawthorns, when he equalised Derby County player Steve Bloomer's goal in a 1–1 draw. He moved to West Ham United for £700 in July 1904 and made 34 league apps scoring 8 goals (1 FA cup app, 0 goals), but returned to Albion for £600 just ten months later. He joined Chesterfield Town in March 1907 and went on to play for Wellington Town and Canadian side Royal Rovers. He died in Wednesbury in 1937. He became the top scorer in First Division 1901–02 by scoring 23 goals.
