= Jimmy McLean (footballer, born 1876) =

English footballer

Personal information
- Full name: James McLean
- Date of birth: 1876
- Place of birth: Stoke-upon-Trent, England
- Date of death: April 1914 (aged 37–38)
- Place of death: Sydney, Australia
- Positions: Wing half; inside forward

Youth career
- Sneyd

Senior career*
Years	Team	Apps	(Gls)
1896	Burslem Port Vale	1	(1)
1896–1898	Eastville Rovers		
1898–1899	Worcester City		
1899–1901	Walsall	59	(5)
1901–1903	West Bromwich Albion	57	(10)
1903–1911	Preston North End	185	(4)
Total		302	(20)
- * Club domestic league appearances and goals

James McLean (1876–1914) was an English footballer who played in the Football League for Preston North End, Walsall and West Bromwich Albion.

== Career ==
McLean played for Sneyd before joining Burslem Port Vale in the summer of 1896. He made his debut at inside-right in a 4–2 defeat at Dresden United in a Staffordshire Senior Cup preliminary round replay on 26 October 1896. He made his Midland Football League debut five days later, scoring in a 3–2 defeat at Wellingborough Town. Despite the goal this was to be his final appearance for the club.

He finished his career at Preston together with James Wilson in the summer of 1911. Around that time, he emigrated to Australia, where he played. He died in 1914.

== Career statistics ==
Appearances and goals by club, season and competition
Club	Season	League			FA Cup		Other		Total	
Club	Season	Division	Apps	Goals	Apps	Goals	Apps	Goals	Apps	Goals
Burslem Port Vale	1896–97	Midland Football League	1	1	0	0	1	0	2	1
Total			1	1	0	0	1	0	2	1
