= Lorenzo Evans =

English footballer

Personal information
- Date of birth: 6 March 1878
- Place of birth: Newton Heath, Manchester
- Date of death: 6 February 1945
- Place of death: Poulton-le-Fylde, Lancashire
- Position: Outside left

Lorenzo Evans (6 March 1878 – 6 February 1945) was an English professional footballer. An outside left, he played in the Football League for Blackburn Rovers, Glossop North End and Blackpool.

He later worked as an architect and surveyor.
