= Hapton F.C. =

Defunct football club in Hapton, Lancashire, England

- Full name: Hapton Football Club
- Founded: 1893
- Dissolved: 1900
- Ground: Lee's Meadow
- Secretary: T. Hodgson
Home colours

Hapton F.C. was an association football club from the village of Hapton, Lancashire, active in the 19th century.

== History ==
The club was founded in 1893. An earlier Hapton F.C. had played in the 1884–85 Lancashire Senior Cup, losing 2–1 to Golborne in the second round.

Hapton's first league was the Burnley and District League, finishing as runner-up in 1894–95, and in 1896 it joined the North-East Lancashire Combination.

The club's greatest honour was winning the 1896–97 Lancashire Junior Cup, in a major shock, as it was the only time a club from the North-East Combination won the tournament, and Hapton had to play eight matches just to reach the final, starting off in the first qualifying rounds. The semi-final, against Turton, had been niggly, the original match at Hapton ending in a draw, but the replay also being played there as Turton had fielded an ineligible player - before the replay Turton officials measured the pitch "amidst the derisive cheers of the Hapton supporters" in preparation for a futile protest. The final, against Skerton in front of 6,000 at Deepdale, had a remarkable ending. In injury time, with Skerton 2–1 to the good, a Hapton corner deflected off the referee - Mr Watson of Accrington - and went over the line; Mr Watson gave the goal, although under the laws in place at the time, the goal should not have counted, as it had not been touched by another player. The game went to extra-time, and in the second period, Hapton's Lomax bundled a rebound home to claim the cup for the underdogs. The triumph helped the club to return a £12 profit on income of £118.

The club joined the Football Association in August 1897. It entered the 1898–99 FA Cup qualifying rounds, but lost 5–0 away to South Shore in the preliminary round. The following season it lost 3–2 at home to Oswaldtwistle Rovers at the same stage, having led for most of the match, but being undone by a winner right at the end of extra-time.

Hapton finished one off the bottom of the North-East Lancashire Combination in 1899–1900, albeit it had also been ahead of two other clubs late in the season (Barnoldswick and Earby) who withdrew before completing their fixtures. It did not however enter the competition for the following season, and a 9–1 defeat to Chorley St George's in the first round of the Junior Cup at the start of 1901 appears to have been the club's last match of any note, future Junior Cup entries being made by Hapton Church.

== Colours ==
The club's regular colour was red; in the Junior Cup final, because of a clash with Skerton's colours, Hapton wore pale blue, while Skerton wore Preston North End's colours.

== Ground ==
The club played at Lee's Meadow.

== Notable players ==
- James Arnott, who joined Burnley in October 1897
