= Andy McGuigan =

Scottish footballer (1878–1948)

Personal information
- Full name: Andrew McGuigan
- Date of birth: 24 February 1878
- Place of birth: Newton Stewart, Scotland
- Date of death: 1948 (aged 69–70)
- Position: Forward

Youth career
- Newton Stewart

Senior career*
Years	Team	Apps	(Gls)
1898–1900	Hibernian	35	(18)
1900–1902	Liverpool	31	(14)
1902–1904	Middlesbrough	1	(0)
1904–1905	Brynn Central		
1905–1906	Southport Central	33	(13)
1906	Accrington Stanley		
1906–1907	Burslem Port Vale	0	(0)
1907–19??	Bristol City	0	(0)
19??–19??	Barrow		
1908–1910	Exeter City		
- * Club domestic league appearances and goals

Andrew McGuigan (24 February 1878 – 1948) was a Scottish professional footballer, described as "speedy and tricky".

He began his career with Hibernian before signing with Liverpool in 1900. With Liverpool, he won a First Division champions medal in 1900–01. He was sold to Middlesbrough in December 1902. He then struggled with injury and wound down his career in brief spells at Southport Central, Accrington Stanley, Burslem Port Vale, Bristol City, Barrow, and Exeter City. He was later on the board of directors at Liverpool.

== Career ==
=== Hibernian ===
McGuigan started his professional career in 1898 with Hibernian in Division One of the Scottish Football League, following a move from local side Newton Stewart (where he was playing when selected for an international trial match in 1897). He made his Hibs debut against Partick Thistle on 3 September, scoring in the 4–1 win. He went on to score seven goals in 19 games in the 1898–99 season. He was the club's top scorer in the 1899–1900 campaign, hitting 12 goals in 19 games. During his time at Easter Road, the club managed two top-four finishes within a few points of second place but some distance from the dominant Rangers.

=== Liverpool ===
He signed with Liverpool for the 1900–01 season and made his debut against Derby County on 6 October. He scored five goals in 14 First Division games, as the "Reds" were crowned champions of English football for the first time. He then scored nine goals in 18 league games in 1901–02; five of his goals came in one game at Anfield, in a 7–0 win over Stoke on 4 January 1902, the first time a Liverpool player accomplished such a feat in a competitive match. He scored 14 goals in 37 games in all competitions for Liverpool.

=== Later career ===
He was signed by Middlesbrough for a £300 fee in December 1902, but injury problems limited to just a single league appearance. He then spent a season with Brynn Central, scoring nearly 30 goals as the pivot of the club's forward line. He moved on to Southport Central, Accrington Stanley, Burslem Port Vale (without playing a game), Bristol City and Barrow. He joined Exeter City in the summer of 1908 as the club turned professional. He finished as the club's top-scorer with 16 Southern League goals. He retired the following season and spent time coaching in Bilbao, Spain. He returned to Liverpool as a scout.

== Style of play ==
McGuigan was a "speedy and tricky" forward that was described by the Lancashire Evening Post as having "capital control of the ball, and accurate feeding... his methods are characterised by sound judgment and artistic execution".

== Later life ==
He later became a club director at Liverpool, serving on the club's board when Liverpool won the championship two consecutive years (1921–22 and 1922–23).

== Career statistics ==
Appearances and goals by club, season and competition
Club	Season	League			National cup (Note: Includes Irish Cup, FA Cup)		Total	
Club	Season	Division	Apps	Goals	Apps	Goals	Apps	Goals
Hibernian	1898–99	Scottish Division One	17	6	2	1	19	7
Hibernian	1899–1900	Scottish Division One	18	12	1	0	19	12
Hibernian	Total		35	18	3	1	38	19
Liverpool	1900–01	First Division	13	5	2	0	15	5
Liverpool	1901–02	First Division	18	9	3	0	21	9
Liverpool	Total		31	14	5	0	36	14
Middlesbrough	1903–04	First Division	1	0	1	0	2	0
Southport Central	1905–06	Lancashire Combination Division One	33	13	1	1	34	13
Burslem Port Vale	1906–07	Second Division	0	0	0	0	0	0
Bristol City	1907–08	First Division	0	0	0	0	0	0

== Honours ==
Liverpool

- Football League First Division: 1900–01
