= Thomas Jackson (footballer, born 1876) =

English footballer

Personal information
- Full name: John Thomas Jackson
- Date of birth: 21 December 1876
- Place of birth: Padiham, England
- Date of death: 1954 (aged 77–78)
- Position: Centre forward

Senior career*
Years	Team	Apps	(Gls)
1896–1897	Padiham		
1897–1899	Blackburn Rovers	26	(10)
1899–1900	Glossop	3	(0)
1900–1907	Chorley		
1907	Glossop Central		
Total		29	(10)
- * Club domestic league appearances and goals

John Thomas Jackson (21 December 1876–1954) was an English footballer who played in the Football League for Blackburn Rovers and Glossop.
