= William Walker (footballer, born 1871) =

Scottish footballer (1871–1907)

Willie Walker
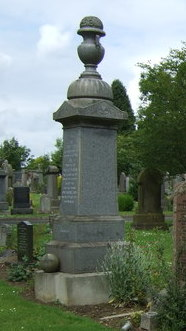
- Walker's memorial at Uphall Cemetery, erected with contributions from Leith Athletic F.C. and others

Personal information
- Full name: William Walker
- Date of birth: 13 November 1871
- Place of birth: Uphall, Scotland
- Date of death: 23 January 1907 (aged 35)
- Place of death: Edinburgh, Scotland
- Position: Inside right

Youth career
- Cardross Swifts

Senior career*
Years	Team	Apps	(Gls)
–	Broxburn Athletic		
–	Broxburn		
1893–1897	Leith Athletic	60	(27)
1897–1898	Liverpool	12	(3)
1898–1907	Leith Athletic	170	(44)
Total		242	(74)
- * Club domestic league appearances and goals

William Walker (13 November 1871 – 23 January 1907) was a Scottish footballer who played as an inside right.

He played for various sides, including Broxburn, Leith Athletic, and Liverpool in the 1897–98 season. He died aged 35 as a result of being kicked in the stomach during a match between Leith Athletic and Vale of Leven in Edinburgh.
