= Jack Morris (footballer) =

English footballer

Jack J. Morris (11 February 1878 – 1947) was an English footballer active at the turn of the 20th century. He made a total of 128 appearances in The Football League for Blackpool, Notts County and Bristol City.
