= Bill Raisbeck =

Scottish footballer (1875–1946)

Personal information
- Full name: William Raisbeck
- Date of birth: 22 December 1875
- Place of birth: Wallacestone, Scotland
- Date of death: 2 November 1946 (aged 70)
- Place of death: Taber, Alberta, Canada
- Height: 5 ft 11 in (1.80 m)
- Position: Half-back

Senior career*
Years	Team	Apps	(Gls)
?–1896	Larkhall Thistle		
1896	Hibernian	0	(0)
1896	Clyde	7	(1)
1896–1897	Sunderland	0	(0)
1897	Royal Albert		
1897–1898	Clyde	11	(1)
1898–1900	Sunderland	69	(6)
1901–1902	Derby County	3	(0)
1902–1904	New Brompton	56	(2)
1904–1905	Reading		
1905–1907	Falkirk	33	(1)
- * Club domestic league appearances and goals

William Raisbeck (22 December 1875 – 2 November 1946) was a Scottish professional association football player at the turn of the twentieth century.

== Career ==
Born in Wallacestone, Stirlingshire but raised in a mining community near Cambuslang in South Lanarkshire, Raisbeck began his career with Larkhall Thistle before going on to Hibernian (no league appearances) and Clyde. In 1896 he travelled south of the border to join Sunderland, but left without playing a match and returned to Scotland, where he played for Royal Albert and once again for Clyde, where he did play in several league matches.

In 1898 he joined Sunderland again, and this time made 69 appearances in the English Football League, scoring five goals. In 1901 he joined Derby County, but made only three appearances.

In 1902 he joined New Brompton of the Southern League, where he played for two seasons, making over 60 appearances. In 1904 he played for Reading, after which he returned to Scotland to play for Falkirk for the next two seasons.

== Personal life ==
In 1907, Raisbeck and other members of his family, including his younger brother Andrew who was also a footballer (Hibernian, Hull City), emigrated to Canada. He died in Alberta in 1946.

He was also the older brother of Scottish international footballer Alex Raisbeck (Hibernian, Liverpool, Partick Thistle, Scotland). A cousin of the family, Luke Raisbeck, played for West Ham United and Blackpool among others.
