= Albert Monks (footballer, born 1875) =

English footballer

Personal information
- Full name: Albert Monks
- Date of birth: 6 May 1875
- Place of birth: Ashton-under-Lyne, England
- Date of death: 1936 (aged 63–64)
- Position: Inside forward

Senior career*
Years	Team	Apps	(Gls)
1894–1895	Ashton Central		
1895–1896	Hurst Ramblers		
1896–1897	Hadfield		
1897–1899	Ashton North End		
1899–1900	Glossop	13	(1)
1900–1901	Stalybridge Rovers		
1901–1902	Bury	16	(7)
1902	Everton	0	(0)
1903–1904	Blackburn Rovers	24	(4)
1904	Nelson		
1905–1906	Swindon Town	15	(1)
1906	Stalybridge Rovers		
1906	Southport Central		
1907	Hyde		
1908	Salford United		
1909	Hurst		
1909	Hooley Hill		
1910	Hurst		
1910	Tonge		
Total		68	(13)
- * Club domestic league appearances and goals

Albert Monks (6 May 1875–1936) was an English footballer who played in the Football League for Blackburn Rovers, Bury and Glossop.
