= Joe Blythe =

English footballer

Personal information
- Date of birth: 2 July 1876
- Place of birth: Berwick-upon-Tweed, England
- Date of death: 20 May 1944 (aged 67)
- Place of death: Berwick-upon-Tweed, England
- Position: Half-back

Senior career*
Years	Team	Apps	(Gls)
- Blyth Spartans
–1899	Jarrow		
1899–1902	Everton	27	(1)
1902–1904	West Ham United	52	(0)
1904–1911	Millwall	341	(3)
1911–?	Watford		

Managerial career
- Blyth Spartans
- * Club domestic league appearances and goals

Joe Blythe (2 Jul 1876 – 20 May 1944) was an English footballer who played as a half-back for Blyth Spartans, Jarrow, Everton, West Ham United, Millwall and Watford.

== Footballing career ==
Born in Berwick-upon-Tweed, England, Blythe played for Blyth Spartans, Jarrow and Everton before moving to West Ham in 1902 and making his debut against Reading on 6 September 1902. Blythe missed only one game in his first season and played 23 games in his second and final season with The Hammers. He joined Millwall for the following season and won the London Challenge Cup with them in 1909. He made 341 appearances for Millwall before moving to Watford for the 1911-12 season.

== Managerial career ==
Blythe was manager of Blyth Spartans before the First World War.
