= Archibald Dunn =

Scottish footballer

Personal information
- Full name: Archibald Dunn
- Date of birth: 14 December 1876
- Place of birth: Bridgeton, Glasgow, Scotland
- Date of death: February 1943 (age 66)
- Height: 5 ft 8 in (1.73 m)
- Position: Wing half

Senior career*
Years	Team	Apps	(Gls)
1892–1893	Avenue Thistle		
1893–1898	Queen's 2nd Gordon Highlanders		
1898–1901	West Bromwich Albion	71	(2)
1901	Bristol Rovers		
1901–1902	Millwall Athletic		
1902–1904	Grimsby Town	45	(1)
1904–190?	Wellingborough		
- * Club domestic league appearances and goals

Archibald Dunn (14 December 1876 – February 1943) was a Scottish professional footballer who played as a wing half.
