= William Wilkinson (cricketer, born 1881) =

English cricketer and footballer

Personal information
- Full name: William Herbert Wilkinson
- Born: 12 March 1881; Thorpe Hesley, Yorkshire, England
- Died: 4 June 1961 (aged 80); Winson Green, Warwickshire, England
- Batting: Left-handed
- Bowling: Slow left arm orthodox

Domestic team information
- Years: Team
- 1903–1910: Yorkshire

Career statistics
Competition	First-class
Matches	127
Runs scored	3,912
Batting average	21.73
100s/50s	1/18
Top score	103
Balls bowled	1,961
Wickets	31
Bowling average	31.32
5 wickets in innings	0
10 wickets in match	0
Best bowling	4/23
Catches/stumpings	93/–
- Source: CricketArchive, 29 December 2009

William Wilkinson
Personal information
- Position: Wing half

Senior career*
Years	Team	Apps	(Gls)
1901–1908	Sheffield United	56	(7)
1909	Bolton Wanderers	–	(–)
- * Club domestic league appearances and goals

William Herbert Wilkinson (12 March 1881 – 4 June 1961) was an English first-class cricketer, who was also a footballer in the Football League First Division.

== Cricket career ==
Born in Thorpe Hesley, Yorkshire, England, Wilkinson was a first-class cricketer who played 127 matches between 1903 and 1910. He played for Yorkshire County Cricket Club from 1903 to 1910, and one match for the North of England in 1908. He also played for the Yorkshire Second XI from 1902 to 1912, and for R. W. Frank's XI in 1906.

A left-handed batsman, Wilkinson scored 3,912 runs at 21.73 with one century, a knock of 103 against Sussex. He took 31 wickets, bowling slow left arm orthodox spin, at 31.32, with a best of 4 for 23 against Oxford University. He also took 4 for 27 against Sussex.

== Football career ==
Wilkinson played between 1901 and 1908 as an inside forward for Sheffield United. His brother, Bernard, also played for United and served as team captain.

== Death ==
Wilkinson died in Winson Green, Warwickshire, England, in June 1961, aged 80.
