= Alexander Higgins (footballer, born 1870) =

English footballer

William Alexander "Sandy" Higgins (born 1870) was an English footballer who played as a full-back. Born in Smethwick, Staffordshire, he played for Manchester United, Albion Swifts, Birmingham St George's, Grimsby Town, Bristol City, Newcastle United and Middlesbrough.
