= Neil Logan =

Scottish footballer

Personal information
- Full name: Neil Logan
- Date of birth: 16 December 1875
- Place of birth: Blantyre, Scotland
- Date of death: 1949 (aged 77–78)
- Position: Centre half

Senior career*
Years	Team	Apps	(Gls)
1895–1896	Blantyre		
1896–1897	Rutherglen Glencairn		
1897–1898	Sheffield United	5	(4)
1898–1902	Swindon Town	98	(3)
1902–1903	Blackburn Rovers	22	(2)
1903–1908	Swindon Town	53	(1)
1908	Haydon Street Workmen		
Total		178	(10)
- * Club domestic league appearances and goals

Neil Logan (16 December 1875 – 1949) was a Scottish footballer who played in the Football League for Blackburn Rovers and Sheffield United.
