= Joe Lumsden =

English footballer (1874–1944)

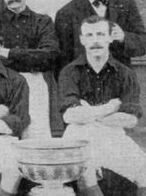

Personal information
- Date of birth: 21 August 1874
- Place of birth: Tanfield, England
- Date of death: 14 August 1944 (aged 69)
- Position: Forward

Senior career*
Years	Team	Apps	(Gls)
1893–1895	Howden Rangers		
1895–1896	Tow Law		
1896–1897	Burton Wanderers		
1897–1898	Liverpool	6	(2)
1898–1900	Glossop North End		
- * Club domestic league appearances and goals

Joe Lumsden (21 August 1874 – 14 August 1944) was an English footballer who played as a forward.

Born in County Durham, Lumsden began his career with local clubs Howden Rangers and Tow Law, before joining Burton Wanderers in 1896. He signed with Liverpool in November 1897, making eight appearances for the club in the First Division and the FA Cup. On his Liverpool debut, Lumsden scored a brace and assisted the other goal in a 3–2 win over Nottingham Forest. However, he failed to strike up a partnership with Harry Bradshaw, and was moved to the left wing. Lumsden finished his career with Glossop North End.
