= William Brimblecombe =

English footballer (1876–1917)

Personal information
- Full name: William Henry Brimblecombe
- Date of birth: 5 January 1876
- Place of birth: Burnley, England
- Date of death: 1917 (aged 40–41)
- Position: Winger

Senior career*
Years	Team	Apps	(Gls)
1894–1895	Burnley	0	(0)
1895–1896	Hapton		
1896–1897	Rossendale United		
1897	Bacup Borough		
1897–1900	Bury	57	(12)
1900	Accrington Stanley		
Total		57	(12)
- * Club domestic league appearances and goals

William Henry Brimblecombe (5 January 1876 – 1917) was an English footballer who played in the Football League for Bury.
