= John Brown (footballer, born 1876) =

Scottish footballer

John Brown (born c. 1876) was a Scottish footballer who played for Sunderland as a midfielder. He made his debut for Sunderland on 4 September 1897 against Sheffield Wednesday in a 1–0 win at Olive Grove. Overall, he made 33 league appearances scoring nine goals while at the club, spanning from 1897 to 1899.
