= Bobby Marshall (footballer, born 1876) =

Scottish footballer (1876–1962)

Personal information
- Full name: Robert Grant Marshall
- Date of birth: 1876
- Place of birth: Edinburgh, Scotland
- Date of death: 1962 (aged 85–86)
- Position: Outside right

Senior career*
Years	Team	Apps	(Gls)
1894–1897	Leith Athletic	37	(14)
1897–1899	Liverpool	21	(2)
1899–1904	Portsmouth	131	(19)
1904–1905	Brighton & Hove Albion		
1905–1906	St Bernard's	4	(1)
- * Club domestic league appearances and goals

Robert Grant Marshall (1876 – 1962) was a Scottish footballer who played as an outside-right, notably for Liverpool and Portsmouth.

Marshall started his career in his native Scotland with Leith Athletic. He left the club in 1897 to transfer to Liverpool, of the English First Division. Marshall struggled to establish himself as a regular at the club and, in 1899, transferred to Portsmouth. He went on to make 131 appearances, scoring 19 goals and helping the side win the Southern Football League in the 1901–02 season.

He was unrelated to John Marshall, who scored for Third Lanark in the 1889 Scottish Cup Final against Celtic.
