= Jimmy Laidlaw =

Scottish footballer

Personal information
- Full name: James A. Laidlaw
- Date of birth: 1873
- Place of birth: Scotland
- Position: Winger

Senior career*
Years	Team	Apps	(Gls)
1895–1896	Burnley	0	(0)
1896–1900	Leith Athletic		
1900–1901	Newcastle United	10	(3)
1901–1902	Woolwich Arsenal	3	(2)
Total		13	(5)
- * Club domestic league appearances and goals

James A. Laidlaw (20 November 1873–unknown) was a Scottish footballer who played in the Football League for Newcastle United and Woolwich Arsenal.
