= Peter Platt (footballer) =

English footballer (1883–1921)

Peter Platt (23 January 1883 – 1921) was an English footballer who played as a goalkeeper for Liverpool in The Football League. Platt started his career at Great Harwood as an amateur before he was signed by Blackburn Rovers F.C. He signed for Liverpool in 1902. He became first choice towards the end of the 1902–03 season and started the following as first choice as well. However, he lost his place to Ned Doig who became the club's new starting goalkeeper. He moved to Luton Town F.C. where he played 139 matches for the club from 1905 to 1909. He died at the age of 38 after an illness.
