= General Stevenson =

English footballer (1875–1961)

Personal information
- Date of birth: 1875
- Place of birth: Padiham, Burnley, England
- Date of death: 1961 (aged 85–86)
- Place of death: Burnley, England
- Position: Full back

Senior career*
Years	Team	Apps	(Gls)
1893–1895	Hapton		
1895–1898	Padiham		
1898–1900	Liverpool	23	(0)
1900–1902	Barnsley	54	
1902–1903	Wellingborough		
1903–1910	Millwall Athletic		
1912–1913	Accrington Stanley		
- * Club domestic league appearances and goals

General Stevenson (1875–1961) was an English footballer who played as a right back, notably for Liverpool and Millwall.

Born in Padiham, west of Burnley, Stevenson began his career in 1893 with the amateur side Hapton. He moved onto Padiham two years later before Liverpool bought him in August 1898. Stevenson debuted for Liverpool in November, away to Nottingham Forest, but made just 23 appearances in the two seasons he spent with the club. He left in 1900 for Barnsley, playing 54 times until transferring to Millwall in 1903. Stevenson established himself as a popular regular for Millwall, becoming team captain and making 318 appearances, scoring nine goals.

Stevenson guided the club to three titles: the London League in 1904 and the Western League in 1908 and 1909. Additionally, Stevenson won the Southern Professional Charity Cup in 1904. His benefit match against Northampton Town in 1909 attracted a crowd of 10,000. He became a pub landlord in retirement. His son, Arthur Stevenson, was a professional rugby league footballer for Wigan. and footballer for Sheffield United and Middlesbrough.
