= Arnie Whittaker =

English footballer

Personal information
- Full name: Arnold Whittaker
- Date of birth: 9 July 1879
- Place of birth: Blackburn, England
- Date of death: 1955 (aged 75–76)
- Position: Winger

Senior career*
Years	Team	Apps	(Gls)
1897–1898	Queen's Park (Blackburn)		
1898–1899	Accrington Stanley		
1899–1908	Blackburn Rovers	250	(57)
1908–1909	Accrington Stanley		
1909–1910	Bury	0	(0)
Total		250	(57)
- * Club domestic league appearances and goals

Arnold Whittaker (9 July 1879–1955) was an English footballer who played in the Football League for Blackburn Rovers.
