= Donald McCallum (footballer, born 1880) =

Scottish footballer

Donald McCallum (born 1880) was a Scottish footballer who played as a defender.
