= Joe Satterthwaite =

English footballer

Personal information
- Full name: Joseph Satterthwaite
- Date of birth: 1885
- Place of birth: Cockermouth, Cumberland, England
- Position: Forward

Senior career*
Years	Team	Apps	(Gls)
- Workington
1906–1908	Woolwich Arsenal	5	(1)
1908–1909	Grimsby Town		
- * Club domestic league appearances and goals

Joe Satterthwaite (born 1885, date of death unknown) was an English footballer.

Born in Cockermouth, Satterthwaite started his career at Workington before moving south to join his brother Charlie at Woolwich Arsenal in December 1906. Joe was the less successful of the two brothers; he had to wait nearly fifteen months for his debut, which finally came on 21 March 1908, against Manchester United.

In total, Satterthwaite played five times for Arsenal, scoring one goal. In two of those league games, he starred with his brother Charlie, making them only one of three pairs of brothers to play together for Arsenal.

Arsenal signed Sam Raybould in the summer of 1908, and Satterthwaite was forced out of the side as a result; he left Arsenal to join Grimsby Town in November 1908.
