= Alex Maconnachie =

Scottish Association footballer

Personal information
- Full name: Alexander Jackson Maconnachie
- Date of birth: 13 May 1876
- Place of birth: Glasgow, Scotland
- Date of death: 1956 (aged 79–80)
- Position: Inside forward

Senior career*
Years	Team	Apps	(Gls)
1896–1897	Glasgow Ashfield		
1897–1898	Derby County	23	(9)
1898–1901	Notts County	76	(26)
1901–1902	Third Lanark	18	(6)
1902–1903	Ripley Athletic		
1903–1904	Newton Rovers		
1905–1906	Ilkeston United		
1906–1908	Alfreton Town		
1908	Tibshelf Colliery		
Total		99	(35)
- * Club domestic league appearances and goals

Alexander Jackson Maconnachie (13 May 1876 – 1956) was a Scottish footballer who played in the Football League for Derby County and Notts County.
