= John Davies (footballer, born 1881) =

English footballer

Personal information
- Date of birth: 1 July 1881
- Place of birth: Liverpool, England
- Position: Forward

Senior career*
Years	Team	Apps	(Gls)
1900–1902	Liverpool	9	(0)
1903	Blackpool	1	(0)
- * Club domestic league appearances and goals

John Davies (born 1 July 1881) was an English professional footballer. A forward, he was on the books of Liverpool and Blackpool.

== Career ==
Davies began his career with one of his hometown clubs, Liverpool. He made his debut for the Reds on 9 March 1901. He made nine Football League and one FA Cup appearances for the Anfield club.

In 1903, he moved a short distance up the coast to join Blackpool. He made one League appearance for the Tangerines, in a 2–0 home defeat to Barnsley on 12 September 1903.
