= Thomas John Hunter =

Scottish footballer (1881–1928)

Thomas John Hunter (1881–1928) was a Scottish footballer, who played as a defender for Liverpool and Preston North End.
