= John Nock (footballer, born 1875) =

English footballer

John F Nock (born 1875) was an English footballer.

He played for West Bromwich Swifts, Halesowen Town, West Bromwich Albion, Langley Richmond, and Brierley Hill Alliance.
