= Andrew McCowie =

Scottish footballer (1876–1957)

Personal information
- Full name: Andrew McCowie
- Date of birth: 6 January 1876
- Place of birth: Old Monkland, Scotland
- Date of death: 15 November 1957 (aged 81)
- Place of death: Cambuslang, Scotland
- Height: 5 ft 4 in (1.63 m)
- Position: Inside forward

Senior career*
Years	Team	Apps	(Gls)
1894–1896	Cambuslang Hibernian		
1896–1899	Liverpool	33	(11)
1899–1900	Woolwich Arsenal	28	(7)
1900–1901	Middlesbrough	17	(5)
1901–1902	Chesterfield Town	17	(7)
- * Club domestic league appearances and goals

Andrew McCowie (6 January 1876 – 15 November 1957) was a Scottish footballer who played as an inside forward in the English Football League for Liverpool, Woolwich Arsenal, Middlesbrough and Chesterfield Town.

== Career ==
McCowie was born in Old Monkland, Lanarkshire, in 1876. He played amateur (Junior) football for local Cambuslang Hibernian, from where he signed for Football League First Division club Liverpool in 1896. He became a fixture in the Liverpool side, playing 19 matches in the 1897–98 Football League season. The following season, he scored five goals in 12 matches as Liverpool finished runners-up to Aston Villa.

In 1899, McCowie dropped down to the Second Division to join Woolwich Arsenal. Playing mainly at inside left, McCowie scored seven goals in 28 league appearances, and also played five matches in the FA Cup. He moved to Middlesbrough early in the 1900–01 season, and spent the following season with another Second Division club, Chesterfield Town. McCowie badly injured a knee during a match against Newton Heath in March 1902, and never played league football again.

McCowie died in Cambuslang, Lanarkshire, on 15 November 1957, at the age of 81.
