= Billy Ball =

English footballer

Personal information
- Full name: William Henry Ball
- Date of birth: 11 April 1876
- Place of birth: West Derby, Liverpool, England
- Date of death: February 1929 (aged 52)
- Position: Full-back

Senior career*
Years	Team	Apps	(Gls)
?-?	Liverpool South End	?	(?)
?-?	Rock Ferry	?	(?)
1897–1898	Blackburn Rovers	17	(0)
1898–1899	Everton	0	(0)
1899–1901	Notts County	65	(2)
1901–1902	Blackburn Rovers	3	(0)
1902–1903	Manchester United	4	(0)
- * Club domestic league appearances and goals

William Henry Ball (11 April 1876 – February 1929) was an English footballer who played as a full-back. Born in West Derby, Liverpool, he played for Liverpool South End, Rock Ferry, Blackburn Rovers, Everton, Notts County and Manchester United.
