= Hugh Morgan (footballer, born 1869) =

Scottish footballer (1869–1938)

Personal information
- Date of birth: 20 September 1869
- Place of birth: Longriggend, Scotland
- Date of death: 30 June 1938 (aged 68)
- Position: Inside left

Senior career*
Years	Team	Apps	(Gls)
- Longriggend Wanderers
1896–1898	St Mirren	34	(5)
1898–1900	Liverpool	59	(15)
1900–1903	Blackburn Rovers		
1903–1904	Dundee	18	(4)
1904–1905	St Mirren	4	(0)

International career
1898	Scottish Football League XI	1	(1)
1898–1899	Scotland	2	(0)
- * Club domestic league appearances and goals

Hugh Morgan (20 September 1869 – 30 June 1938) was a Scottish footballer who played mainly as an inside left.

Morgan was born in Lanarkshire, and played for Liverpool from 1898 to 1900; he was the club's top scorer during the 1898–99 season. 1899–1900 proved to be his final year at Anfield and he finished his Liverpool career with 18 goals from 68 league and cup appearances. He started and finished his senior career at St Mirren, and also played for Blackburn Rovers in England and Dundee in Scotland.
