= Alex Raisbeck =

Scottish footballer & manager (1878–1949)

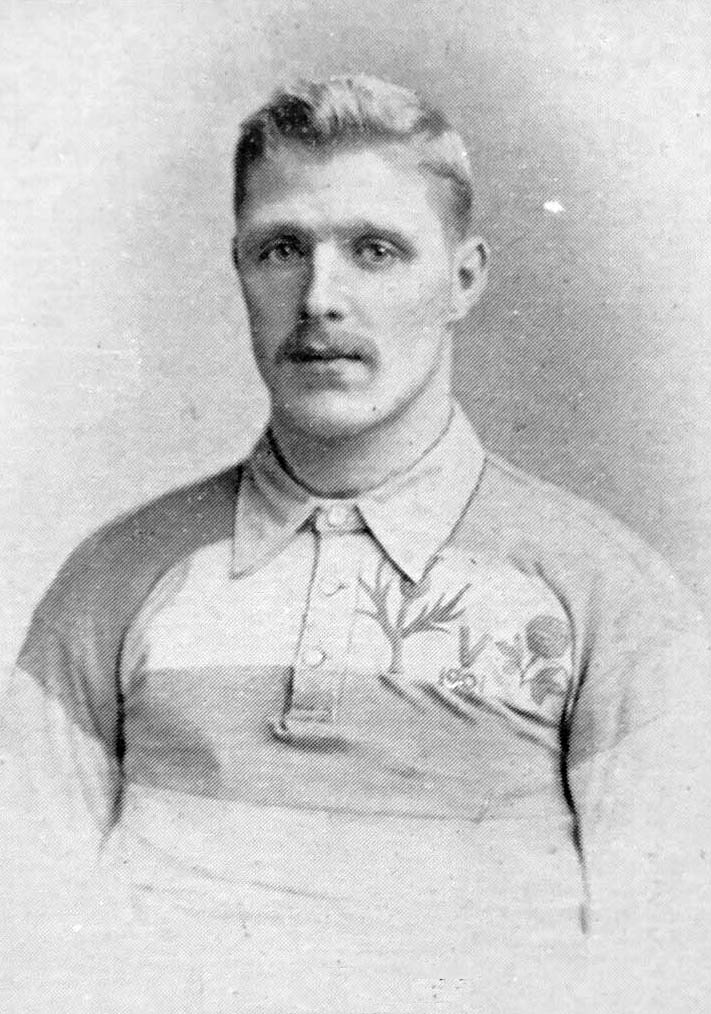
- Raisbeck in Scotland colours (yellow and pink), c. 1901

Personal information
- Full name: Alexander Galloway Raisbeck
- Date of birth: 26 December 1878
- Place of birth: Wallacestone, Scotland
- Date of death: 12 March 1949 (aged 70)
- Place of death: Liverpool, England
- Height: 5 ft 10 in (1.78 m)
- Position: Defender

Senior career*
Years	Team	Apps	(Gls)
1894–1896	Larkhall Thistle		
1896–1898	Hibernian	25	(3)
1898	Stoke	4	(0)
1898–1909	Liverpool	312	(19)
1909–1914	Partick Thistle	113	(7)
Total		454	(29)

International career
1897–1912	Scottish League XI	3	(0)
1900–1907	Scotland	8	(0)

Managerial career
- 1914–1917: Hamilton Academical
- 1921–1929: Bristol City
- 1930–1936: Halifax Town
- 1936–1938: Chester
- 1938–1939: Bath City
- * Club domestic league appearances and goals

Alexander Galloway Raisbeck (26 December 1878 – 12 March 1949) was a Scottish professional football player and manager. After playing junior football for Larkhall Thistle, he was signed by Hibernian where he made his professional debut at the age of 17. Despite playing only ten matches in his first season, he was chosen to represent a Scottish League XI in a match against their Irish counterparts.

In 1898, he joined English First Division side Stoke on a short term deal at the end of the 1897–98 season, playing in four league matches and four Football League test matches to help the club avoid relegation. His form attracted attention from other clubs and he signed for Liverpool in May 1898. He quickly established himself in the first-team and was appointed club captain after two seasons at the age of 21, leading the side to their first ever league title in 1901. Liverpool were relegated in 1904 and Raisbeck subsequently cancelled his plans to leave the club to help them win promotion back to the First Division at the first attempt, winning the Second Division title in 1905.

Returning to the First Division for the 1905–06 season, he was part of the side that won the league title on their return. He remained with Liverpool until 1909, making over 300 appearances during an eleven-year spell, when mounting injuries and homesickness led him to seek a return to his native Scotland, eventually signing for Partick Thistle. He captained Thistle for five seasons before undergoing an operation to cure potential appendicitis that led to his retirement from playing in 1914.

During his career, Raisbeck also represented the Scotland national team on nine occasions between 1900 and 1907, although a match against England in which 25 fans died in a stand collapse was later discounted. Following his retirement, Raisbeck managed Hamilton Academical, Bristol City, Halifax Town, Chester and Bath City.

== Early life ==
Raisbeck was born in the village of Wallacestone near Polmont, Stirlingshire on Boxing Day, 1878. However, his family moved from the village to Slamannan before eventually settling in South Lanarkshire, living in a house near Cambuslang built on the site of a former infectious disease hospital.

His parents, Luke and Jean, had fourteen children, although only eight lived to adulthood. At age twelve, Raisbeck was given the choice of picking a line of work and decided to follow his father and older brothers into the local colliery to work as a coal miner. He would start work in the pit at six in the morning and would not return to the surface until at least five in the afternoon each day.

== Club career ==
=== Scotland ===
After playing for a youth team sponsored by a local church, Raisbeck joined Larkhall Thistle at the age of thirteen and was placed in the club's third team. However, after a single season, he was promoted to the first-team and started playing in the unfamiliar outside right position. He later commented on his belief that the club's selection committee "must have noticed my extraordinary tendency to wander into the middle of the field" and he eventually switched to playing as a defender.

Two of his brothers, Willie and Andrew, were also part of the Larkhall Junior side and the trio helped the side to win their first trophy since the club was founded. His performances were brought to the attention of Hibernian player Joe Murphy, known commonly as Judge as he wore a wig, who visited Raisbeck's family home to try to convince him to join the club. At the time, Raisbeck had actually given up on playing football due to a knee injury but was eager to leave his mining job and signed for the club on 30 July 1896. Despite looking to leave the mining profession, Raisbeck later commented on his desire to learn the trade, stating footballers "who have no trade will have to turn their hands to menial labour, [...] the skilled trades will be able to command the standard rate of wages."

Raisbeck made his professional debut for Hibernian less than two months after signing, playing in a 2–2 draw with Abercorn on 12 September 1896, and scored his first goal for the club in the reverse fixture against Abercorn in a 9–0 victory. He made ten appearances in all competitions during the season, helping Hibs to second place, and impressed selectors enough to be called up to the Scottish League XI as a reserve player for a match against their Irish counterparts. However, Alex Keillor later withdrew from the squad which allowed Raisbeck to start the match played at Solitude.

At the age of seventeen, Raisbeck travelled to Aberdour with the Hibernian squad for a training camp. During a dinner, he rushed to finish his soup during a heated discussion and swallowed a small bone that became lodged in his throat; players and coaches made frantic attempts to help Raisbeck as he struggled to breathe and began to lose consciousness before club trainer Paddy Canon was able to hit him hard enough on the back to dislodge the bone. In his second season at Hibernian, he missed just two league matches as Hibernian finished in third place.

=== Stoke ===
At the end of the 1897–98 season, Raisbeck and Hibs teammate Jack Kennedy joined Stoke on a short term deal for two months. English clubs would frequently bring in Scottish players temporarily to bolster their squad in the final matches of the season. He played four league matches for the club as they finished bottom of the Football League First Division and were entered into Football League test matches, a four team mini-league where the bottom two clubs in the First Division and the top two clubs in the Second Division played each other once with the top two playing in the First Division the following season. He played in all four test matches as Stoke finished top of the mini-league, although all four teams were allowed into the First Division as the Football League decided to expand the number of teams.

=== Liverpool ===
Stoke hoped to sign Raisbeck on a permanent basis and made an appointment with manager Horace Austerberry to discuss terms. However, Austerberry failed to arrive for the meeting and Raisbeck later met Liverpool manager Tom Watson at the home of the Hibernian chairman. Watson quickly made him an offer to join Liverpool and the transfer was completed on 6 May 1898. He was welcomed to the club with a Lancashire hotpot dinner, a tradition for Liverpool to initiate new players. One of several Scottish players in the squad, Raisbeck commented that he was "welcomed with open arms" and "felt at home right away" and became particularly good friends with fellow Scot John Walker.

After a twelve week training camp near Blackpool, he made his debut in a First Division match against Sheffield Wednesday on 3 September 1898. Liverpool reached the semi-final of the FA Cup in his first season at the club, playing a four game tie against Sheffield United. Liverpool had led 2–1 and 4–2 in the original tie and first replay before drawing both matches after conceding late goals and a second replay was abandoned with Liverpool leading 1–0 after Sheffield fans ran onto the pitch on more than one occasion. Liverpool would eventually lose 1–0 in a fourth match and Raisbeck would be called into a hearing by a disciplinary panel after Liverpool players " severely jostled" the referee at the end of the match having been aggrieved at his decisions. The referee believed Raisbeck had witnessed the incident and asked him to name the players responsible but Raisbeck refused, later stating "I did not think any of our players had had anything to do with the demonstration". Along with teammates Walker and William Goldie, he was reported by the referee over the incident but was later cleared of any wrongdoing. In the league, Liverpool finished as runners-up to Aston Villa after losing their final match of the season.

After two seasons at Anfield, Raisbeck was appointed club captain and led Liverpool to their first ever league title in 1900–01. They claimed the title after defeating West Bromwich Albion in the final game of the season. Following their victory, the team were cheered off at Birmingham Snow Hill railway station by West Brom fans before being greeted by around 50,000 fans upon their return to Liverpool Central railway station. In April 1901, the Football League introduced a £4 weekly maximum wage for footballers which severely impacted Liverpool who were seen as one of the higher paying teams in England. To try and ensure they could pay their players extra money, they would assign players jobs within the club that they could be paid for. Raisbeck himself was employed as a bill inspector, his job being to monitor public notice boards to check whether they were correctly advertising the club's fixtures.

Three years after the club won the league title, they suffered relegation to the Second Division. Raisbeck had considered leaving Liverpool at the start of the 1903–04 season but changed his mind when they were relegated, stating "I simply could not leave my club in its day of disaster." He remained with the club and helped them win promotion back to the First Division after a single season after recording a record points total, with only goalkeeper Ned Doig making more appearances during the course of the season. On their return to the First Division, the Liverpool board decided to form the club into a limited company. When the players were informed of the decision by manager Watson during a training camp in The Midlands, several senior players, including Raisbeck, decided to invest in shares of the club with ten of the fifteen players at the camp choosing to purchase shares.

In their first season back in the First Division, Raisbeck enjoyed his most successful campaign with the club as he helped them to lift the league title, the Sheriff of London Charity Shield and the Liverpool Senior Cup. In the FA Cup, Liverpool were defeated by local rivals Everton in the semi-finals. Prior to the match, as captain, Raisbeck had met with the club's directors and pushed for the inclusion of Sam Raybould in the starting line-up which was agreed after it was confirmed that he had sufficiently recovered from injury. However, some players later met with the directors and convinced them to drop Raybould and gave the directors the impression that Raisbeck was in agreement with this decision. The directors relented and the team was rearranged without Raisbeck's knowledge. He would later comment on the changes which left several players out of position for the match, stating " our forwards were all out of tune and they did little that was right. We lost, but I still feel it was an error of judgement which deprived Liverpool of competing in the final."

As a reward for winning the First Division title, the Liverpool squad were sent to Paris for a team holiday where they met swimmer John Arthur Jarvis following his victory in a race in the Seine. In his later years with Liverpool, mounting injuries began to take their toll on Raisbeck's body and his appearances for the club steadily decreased each season. During the 1908–09 season, he developed a knee injury that kept him out of the first-team for four months and the extended time away from the club led him to become homesick and he eventually informed the club of his wish to return to Scotland. The club's board were initially unwilling to allow their captain to leave but relented when he told them it was for health reasons. He played his final match for the club on 30 April 1909, a 1–0 victory over Newcastle United that saw Liverpool avoid relegation. During his time at Anfield, he made 341 appearances in all competitions, scoring 19 goals.

=== Partick Thistle ===
Raisbeck's teammate Maurice Parry was out of contract at Liverpool at the end of the 1908–09 season and was in talks with Scottish side Partick Thistle over a potential move. Thistle club secretary George Easton, a friend of Raisbeck, approached him for his opinion on Parry and during their conversation he remarked to Easton over his desire to move. Easton quickly contacted Liverpool and the transfer was completed soon after for a fee of £500. The team had finished bottom of the Scottish First Division the previous season but were due to move into their new ground Firhill and Raisbeck and Parry were part of several signings brought in to boost the club's fortunes.

He was appointed club captain on his arrival and went on to make over 100 appearances for the club during a five-year spell. In his final season at Partick, Raisbeck sustained a blow to the abdomen during a league match against Dundee but played on after an initial wave of pain. However, in the dressing room after the match he experienced more pain and the club doctor advised that the injury was not serious but could lead to appendicitis. He played on for several matches but grew uneasy over the increased pain after matches and eventually sought further advice from a professor who advised him to undergo surgery, which took place on Christmas Day 1913 in Glasgow. The injury ruled him out of his benefit match and he never played a competitive match for Partick again.

== International career ==
Having represented the Scottish Football League XI, Raisbeck made his senior international debut for Scotland on 17 April 1900 in a 4–1 victory over England. On 5 April 1902, he played in a match against England that was later declared void following the 1902 Ibrox disaster in which 25 people died when a stand at the stadium collapsed. Raisbeck later recalled the moment he heard the stand give way, believing initially that the crowd had attempted to storm the pitch. The match was temporarily halted and the teams returned to the dressing rooms where some of the injured spectators were being treated. Describing the scene, Raisbeck commented "I shall never forget the scenes inside. Dead bodies and groaning men were lying on the seats where only a short time ago the Scottish players had stripped. Even some of the players' clothing was requisitioned for bandages." The match later resumed but was not counted by either the English or Scottish Football Associations in official statistics.

He went on to win a total of eight caps, all but one coming in matches against England.

== Managerial career ==
In March 1914, Raisbeck met an official working for Hamilton Academical who informed him that the club were looking to employ their first manager. He enquired about taking the job and was eventually hired. He spent three years in charge of the club before changing roles to a director for a further three and a half years.

On 28 December 1921, Raisbeck was appointed manager of Second Division side Bristol City, but was unable to avoid relegation to the Third Division South in his first season. The following year, he led the team to promotion back into the Second Division by winning the Third Division South titles. His success with Bristol saw him named as one of the candidates to take over as Liverpool manager from David Ashworth but the post was eventually given to Matt McQueen. Bristol suffered relegation again in the 1923–24 season and, despite returning to the Second Division three years later, he resigned from his post in June 1929.

After a six-year spell with Halifax Town, he took over the manager's role at Chester in 1936, after being chosen from over 100 applicants, as the permanent replacement for Charlie Hewitt. In July 1938, Raisbeck was appointed manager of Southern Football League side Bath City, however the outbreak of World War II in 1939 led all competitive football to be suspended and he left his position at the club. He later returned to Liverpool following the end of the war, working as a scout until his death in 1949.

== Personal life ==
Raisbeck fathered fourteen children during his life. During World War II, six of Raisbeck's sons served in the armed forces, four of them as officers. He died in Liverpool on 12 March 1949 at the age of 70, leaving £276 and 18 shillings in his will.

Two of his brothers were also footballers: Bill's clubs included Sunderland and Falkirk, while Andrew appeared for Hibernian and was a reserve at Liverpool, then played for Hull City. Both emigrated to Canada in 1907 along with other family members. A cousin of the family, Luke Raisbeck, played for West Ham United and Blackpool among others.

== Career statistics ==
=== Club ===
Club	Season	League			FA Cup		Other (Note: Includes Football League test matches and Sheriff of London Charity Shield matches.)		Total	
Club	Season	Division	Apps	Goals	Apps	Goals	Apps	Goals	Apps	Goals
Hibernian	1896–97	Scottish Division One	9	1	1	0	—		10	1
Hibernian	1897–98	Scottish Division One	16	2	4	1	—		20	3
Hibernian	Total		25	3	5	1	0	0	30	3
Stoke	1897–98	First Division	4	0	0	0	4	1	8	1
Liverpool	1898–99	First Division	32	1	6	1	—		38	2
Liverpool	1899–1900	First Division	32	4	4	0	—		38	4
Liverpool	1900–01	First Division	31	1	2	0	—		33	1
Liverpool	1901–02	First Division	26	0	3	1	—		29	1
Liverpool	1902–03	First Division	27	1	1	0	—		28	1
Liverpool	1903–04	First Division	30	1	1	0	—		31	1
Liverpool	1904–05	Second Division	33	2	2	0	—		35	2
Liverpool	1905–06	First Division	36	1	4	0	1	0	41	1
Liverpool	1906–07	First Division	27	4	1	0	—		28	4
Liverpool	1907–08	First Division	23	2	3	0	—		26	2
Liverpool	1908–09	First Division	15	2	1	0	—		16	2
Liverpool	Total		312	19	28	2	0	0	341	21
Career total			341	22	33	2	5	1	379	25

=== International ===
National team	Year	Apps	Goals
Scotland	1900	1	0
Scotland	1901	1	0
Scotland	1902	1	0
Scotland	1903	2	0
Scotland	1904	1	0
Scotland	1906	1	0
Scotland	1907	1	0
Total		8	0

=== Managerial statistics ===
Managerial record by team and tenure (Note: Statistics unavailable where columns are left empty.)
Team	From	To	Record					Ref
Team	From	To	P	W	D	L	Win %	Ref
Hamilton Academical	1914	1917						
Bristol City	December 1921	June 1929	336	143	80	113	42.6	
Halifax Town	June 1930	May 1936						
Chester	May 1936	April 1938	86	38	21	27	44.2	
Bath City	June 1938	1939						
Total			422	181	101	140	42.9	—

== Honours ==
As a player: Liverpool

- Football League First Division winner: 1900–01, 1905–06
- Football League Second Division winner: 1904–05
- Sheriff of London Charity Shield winner: 1906

Hibernian

- Scottish League runner-up: 1896–97

As a manager:

Bristol City

- Football League Division Three (South) Champions 1923, 1927

== See also ==
- List of Scotland national football team captains
- List of Scottish football families
