= Charlie Satterthwaite =

English footballer (1877–1948)

Personal information
- Full name: Charles Oliver Satterthwaite
- Date of birth: 2 March 1877
- Place of birth: Cockermouth, England
- Date of death: 25 May 1948 (aged 71)
- Place of death: Workington, England
- Position: Forward

Youth career
- Black Diamonds
- Workington

Senior career*
Years	Team	Apps	(Gls)
1896–1897	Bury	4	(2)
1897–1899	Burton Swifts	8	(0)
1899–1902	Liverpool	46	(12)
1902–1903	New Brompton	30	(12)
1903–1904	West Ham United	32	(13)
1904–1910	Woolwich Arsenal	129	(45)
- * Club domestic league appearances and goals

Charles Oliver Satterthwaite (2 March 1877 – 25 May 1948) was an English footballer who played as a forward in the Football League for Bury, Burton Swifts, Liverpool and Woolwich Arsenal.

== Career ==
Born in Cockermouth, Cumberland, Satterthwaite played as a youth for local sides Black Diamonds and Workington before he joined Football League side Bury in 1896. Satterthwaite then moved to Burton Swifts a year later. As a striker known for his powerful shooting, he made enough of a name for himself at Burton to be signed by Liverpool in 1899.

He made his Liverpool debut away to Nottingham Forest on 16 December 1899, and scored on his Anfield debut against Glossop North End on 23 December. He continued to play for Liverpool that season, scoring five goals in 18 matches, and scored five in 22 matches the following season as Liverpool won the 1900–01 First Division title. However, after losing his regular place within the side early in the 1901–02 season, he moved on to Southern League football, first with New Brompton and then, at the close of the 1902–03 season, to West Ham United.

After a season at the Irons, scoring 18 goals in 36 matches, Satterthwaite joined Woolwich Arsenal in the summer of 1904, with Arsenal having just been promoted to the First Division. Satterthwaite made his debut in Arsenal's first top-flight match, away to Newcastle United on 3 September 1904; Arsenal lost 3–0. On 24 September 1904, Satterthwaite scored Arsenal's first goal in the top flight, in a 2–0 win over Wolverhampton Wanderers.

Satterthwaite was a first-team regular for Woolwich Arsenal for the next three seasons; although the newly promoted club were unable to challenge for the First Division title, they made a strong showing in the FA Cup, reaching the semi-finals in 1905–06 and 1906–07. Satterthwaite was Arsenal's top scorer in both the 1904–05 and 1906–07 seasons with 11 and 19 goals, respectively. However, his age was catching up with him and between 1907 and 1910 he played fewer first-team matches. Nevertheless, upon his retirement in the summer of 1910 at the age of 33, he had played 141 matches for Arsenal, scoring 48 goals.

== Personal life ==
Satterthwaite served as a corporal in the Royal Fusiliers during the First World War. He died in 1948, aged 71. His brother, Joe Satterthwaite, also played for Woolwich Arsenal; they were the first pair of brothers to do so.
