= Bill Perkins (footballer, born 1876) =

English footballer (1876–1940)

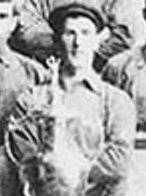

Personal information
- Full name: William Henry Perkins
- Date of birth: 26 January 1876
- Place of birth: Wellingborough, England
- Date of death: c. 1940 (aged 63–64)
- Place of death: Rushden, England
- Position: Goalkeeper

Youth career
- 1892–1894: Wellingborough Trinity

Senior career*
| Years | Team | Apps | (Gls) |
| 1894–1898 | Kettering Town | | |
| 1898–1899 | Luton Town | | |
| 1899–1903 | Liverpool | 107 | (0) |
| 1903–1906 | Northampton Town | 101 | (0) |
| Total | | 208 | (0) |
- * Club domestic league appearances and goals

William Perkins (26 January 1876 - c. 1940) was an English football goalkeeper who notably played for Liverpool in the late 19th and early 20th centuries.

== Life and playing career ==
Perkins played for Kettering and Luton Town before being signed by Liverpool on 25 March 1899, making his senior debut on 3 April 1899 in a Football League Division One match against Newcastle at Anfield, a game that the Reds won 3–2.

Perkins became the Reds number 1 when he took over from Matt McQueen, who had often played in outfield positions. Harry Storer started the first 11 games during the 1899–1900 season but Perkins took over and remained first choice until 1903 when he shared the duties with Peter Platt. Perkins was an ever present between the sticks when Liverpool won their first ever Football League First Division title in 1900–01.

After leaving Liverpool he joined Northampton Town of the Southern League.
