= Tommy Robertson =

Scottish footballer (1876–1941)

Personal information
- Full name: Thomas Robertson
- Date of birth: 17 October 1876
- Place of birth: East Benhar (Fauldhouse), Scotland
- Date of death: 13 August 1941 (aged 64)
- Place of death: Harthill, Scotland
- Height: 5 ft 7 in (1.70 m)
- Position: Outside left

Youth career
- East Benhar Heatherbell
- Motherwell
- Fauldhouse

Senior career*
Years	Team	Apps	(Gls)
1896–1898	Hearts	25	(18)
1898–1902	Liverpool	126	(32)
1902	Hearts	3	(0)
1902–1903	Dundee	13	(1)
1903	Manchester United	3	(0)
1905–?	Bathgate		

International career
1898	Scotland	1	(1)
- * Club domestic league appearances and goals

Thomas Robertson (17 October 1876 – 13 August 1941) was a Scottish footballer who played as an outside left. He was part of the Heart of Midlothian team that won the Scottish league title in 1897. He also played for Liverpool between 1898 and 1902, helping them to the Football League title in 1901.

== Life and playing career ==
Born in Scotland, Robertson played for East Benhar Heatherbell, Motherwell, Fauldhouse and Hearts – it is reported that the Edinburgh club took him on after an impressive performance making up their numbers in a reserve game at Fauldhouse. He went on to win the Scottish League title with Hearts in 1897.

Robertson was signed along with John Walker for £350 by Liverpool manager Tom Watson in March 1898. He made his debut in a Football League Division One against Sheffield Wednesday on 11 April 1898, scoring his first goal in the same match.

The winger had a very successful time at Anfield missing just a single game in his first two seasons at the club, he scored 19 goals, a respected figure for his position. Robertson was ever present in the 1900–01 season, as the Reds went on to win their first league title.

Robertson left Liverpool at the end of the following season after making a further 25 appearances, returning to Edinburgh and Hearts. He also went on to play for Dundee, Manchester United (one of the very few players to have played for both bitter rivals at each end of the East Lancs Road) and Bathgate.

Robertson received one cap for Scotland, playing against Ireland in a British Championship match on 26 March 1898 at Solitude, Belfast; he also managed to find the net in a 3–0 victory for Scotland. In both 1900 and 1901 he took part in the Home Scots v Anglo-Scots trial match (alongside William Robertson and Tom Robertson in the first and up against Jacky Robertson in the second – all no relation), but this did not lead to any further international appearances.

== Honours ==
=== Club ===
Hearts

- 1896–97 Scottish Division One

Liverpool

- Football League First Division: 1900–01
