= Charlie Wilson (footballer, born 1877) =

English footballer (1877–?)

Personal information
- Date of birth: February 1877
- Place of birth: Stockport, England
- Date of death: Unknown
- Position: Wing half

Senior career*
Years	Team	Apps	(Gls)
1895–1897	Stockport County		
1897–1905	Liverpool	84	(3)
- * Club domestic league appearances and goals

Charlie Wilson (born February 1877, in Stockport) was an English footballer who played for Liverpool and Stockport County. He won the League Title with Liverpool in 1901, but was forced to retire through injury four years later. He remained at Anfield in various scouting and coaching roles up until the start of World War II.
