= John Walker (footballer, born 1873) =

Scottish footballer (1873–1937)

Johnny Walker
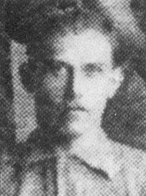

Personal information
- Date of birth: 24 August 1873
- Place of birth: Shotts, Scotland
- Date of death: 17 February 1937 (aged 63)
- Place of death: Louise, Manitoba, Canada
- Height: 5 ft 8 1/2 in (1.74 m)
- Position: Inside forward

Youth career
- –1893: Armadale

Senior career*
Years	Team	Apps	(Gls)
1893–1898	Heart of Midlothian	82	(31)
1898–1902	Liverpool	109	(29)
1902–1905	Rangers	50	(24)
1905–1906	Morton	28	(6)
Total		269	(90)

International career
1895–1904	Scotland	5	(3)
1896–1904	Scottish League XI	5	(0)
- * Club domestic league appearances and goals

John Walker (24 August 1873 – 17 February 1937) was a Scottish footballer who played for Armadale, Heart of Midlothian, Liverpool, Rangers and Morton in the 1890s and 1900s. He won national titles in Scotland and England, and represented both Scotland and the Scottish League XI.

== Playing career ==
=== Club ===
Born in Shotts, North Lanarkshire, Walker played for local team Armadale before being recruited by leading club Hearts, making his league debut for the Edinburgh club on 18 February 1893. He played four full seasons with Hearts, winning two League Championships and one Scottish Cup, and was nearing the end of a fifth campaign when he was signed for Liverpool by manager Tom Watson along with teammate Tommy Robertson for £350 on 30 March 1898. He made his Reds debut in a Football League Division One fixture on 11 April 1898.

Walker only missed two games during his first full season, scoring 12 goals in 38 games, a decent return for an inside forward. He was a regular member of the Anfield club's first league championship win in 1901, and scored the winning goal against West Bromwich Albion on the final day of the season to secure the title.

Walker played another 18 times for Liverpool in 1901–02 before returning to Scotland to join Rangers, who had just won a fourth successive domestic title but were also facing financial troubles due to the reconstruction work required on their stadium after the recent 1902 Ibrox disaster. He scored at a rate of nearly a goal every two league games over his three seasons with the Glasgow club, and appeared in two further Scottish Cup finals. In 1905 he moved on to play for Morton, however he was there for only a short time before suffering a serious knee injury which ended his playing career.

=== International ===
Walker played five times for Scotland. (Note: In the Scottish Football Association's website profile, Walker's record also includes the statistics for Jock Walker who gained 9 caps / 0 goals between 1911 and 1913.) He made his debut in an 1895 British Home Championship match against Ireland, scoring two goals in the 3–1 victory at Celtic Park. He also represented the Scottish League XI five times, while he was with Hearts and Rangers.

== Later life and death ==
In 1910, Walker moved to Canada to become an engineer with Manitoba Telephones. He eventually enlisted for service in World War I (although was initially rejected due to his injured leg), joining the Canadian Military Engineers in 1916 and spending most of the conflict attached to the Canadian Signal Corps. After the war he returned to his telecoms job in Manitoba. He died in 1937 from an accident while cutting wood.

== Honours ==
Heart of Midlothian

- Scottish Football League: 1894–95, 1896–97
- Scottish Cup: 1895–96

Liverpool

- Football League Championship: 1900–01

Rangers

- Scottish Cup: 1902–03
  - Runners-up: 1903–04
