= Goldie (given name) =

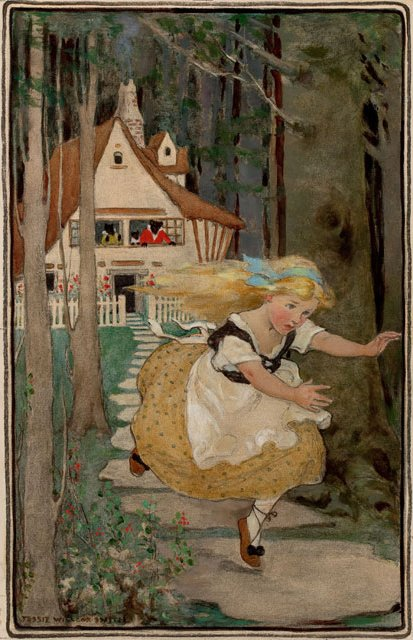
- Goldilocks and the Three Bears by Jessie Willcox Smith, 1916.
- Gender: Primarily female
- Language: English

Origin
- Meaning: gold

Other names
- Related names: Argolda, Gaulda, Gold, Golda, Goldah, Golde, Goldea, Goldean, Goldeana, Goldee, Golden, Goldena, Goldene, Goldey, Goldi, Goldia, Goldina, Goldine, Golds, Goldsmith, Goldsworthy, Goldwin, Goldwyn, Goldy, Goldye, Marigold.

Goldie is a nickname or given name used in reference to an informal English diminutive word for gold or an English version of the Yiddish name Golda or Golde, also meaning gold. It was often used as a pet name for a girl with blonde hair. It is also used as a nickname for formal names such as Marigold. It has a “vintage vibe” for some parents who have considered it. Other commentators note that the name has risen in use for girls along with other names of a similar style that all exude cuteness and promote enjoyment, perhaps in reaction to serious times. The English expression good as gold is often used to describe people who act virtuously and, in the case of children, are well-behaved.

== Cultural influences ==
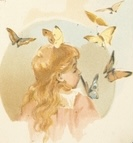
An illustration from Sweet Girl Goldie by Lizbeth B. Humphrey, c. 1884

Names given in reference to gold such as Golda and Golde were popular for Yiddish-speaking Jews in Eastern Europe and also began to be used more widely in the United States after immigrants from that cultural group arrived there in large numbers between 1880 and 1925. Americans named Golda or Golde often were called Goldie. The name Goldie has also been widely used in the Anglosphere for other cultural groups, often inspired by literary, film, television, or popular culture references such as Sweet Girl Goldie: A Wonder Story of Butterfly Time, an 1884 butterfly-shaped children's book by American author and illustrator Lizbeth Bullock Humphrey about a little girl named Goldie who frees her uncle's butterfly collection; Little Goldie, or the Child of the Camp, an 1893 play by Charles O. Willard about a girl who turns out to be a mining heiress; Goldie’s Inheritance: A Story of the Siege of Atlanta, a 1903 historical novel by Louisa M. Whitney, based on the true story of her sister who helped Union soldiers escape from a Confederate prison during the American Civil War; and Goldie Green, a 1922 American film about Goldie, a 19-year-old theater manager who supports her parents and siblings and chooses to marry the penniless man she loves instead of a wealthy attorney. Goldie Griffith (1893–1976) was an American bronco rider in Buffalo Bill's Wild West Show whose 1913 marriage in the middle of a performance at Madison Square Garden received media coverage. Later influences included American country singer Goldie Hill (1933–2005), who had a 1953 hit song called I Let the Stars Get in My Eyes, and American actress Goldie Hawn (born 1945), whose popularity in the 1970s and 1980s also increased interest in the name.

== Usage ==
The name was among the one thousand most used names for girls in the United States between 1880 and 1940, then declined in use. It has recently increased in usage again and has been among the one thousand most used names for newborn American girls since 2021. It was also among the top 1,000 names for American boys at different points between 1891 and 1908. It has also been among the top 1,000 names for newborn girls in Canada since 2021. The name has also been among the top 1,000 names for newborn girls in England and Wales since 2021.

== Women ==
- Goldie Alexander (1936–2020), Australian author
- Goldie Boutilier (born 1985), Canadian singer-songwriter, model and DJ
- Goldie Brangman-Dumpson (1920–2020), African-American nurse and educator
- Goldie "Red" Burns (1925–2013), Canadian-born American educator
- Goldie Cheung, American actress
- Goldie Colwell (1889–1982), American film actress
- Goldie Ghamari (born 1985), Canadian politician
- Goldie Goldbloom (born 1964), Australian novelist
- Goldie Griffith (1893–1976), American bronco rider
- Goldie Harvey (1981–2013), Nigerian singer
- Goldie Hawn (born 1945), American actress
- Goldie Hershon (1941–2020), Canadian human rights activist
- Goldie Hill (1933–2005), American singer
- Goldie Hoffman (1921–2008), American operatic mezzo-soprano and academic teacher
- Goldie Milgram (born 1955), American rabbi
- Goldie Morgentaler (born 1950), Canadian translator
- Goldie Sayers (born 1982), British track and field athlete
- Goldie Semple (1952–2009), Canadian actress
- Goldie Steinberg (1900–2015), American supercentenarian
- Goldie Taylor (born 1968), American author
- Goldie Watson (1909–1994), American teacher and city official

== Men ==
- Goldie Behl (born 1975), Indian filmmaker
- Goldie Cephus (1898–1983), African-American baseball outfielder
- Goldie Collins (1901–1982), Australian rules footballer
- Goldie "Red" Davis, American baseball player
- Goldsworthy "Goldie" Dickinson (1862–1932), British political scientist
- A. T. Goldie Gardner (1890–1958), English racing car driver
- Goldie Goldthorpe (born 1953), Canadian ice hockey player
- Goldie Holt (1902–1991), American professional baseball player
- Goldie Loc, American musician
- Clifford "Goldie" Price (born 1965), English music producer and DJ
- Goldie Rapp (1892–1966), American professional baseball player
- Goldie Sellers (1942–2020), American football player
- Goldie Thomas (1885–1972), Australian cricketer

== Stage name ==
- Goldie Anand (1934–2004), Indian filmmaker
- Goldie Ray (1966–2022), American professional wrestler, actress, and businesswoman
- Goldie Rogers (1950–2012), ring name of Canadian professional wrestler David Sherwin

== Fictional characters ==
- Goldilocks, often called Goldie, from the fairy tale "Goldilocks and the Three Bears"
- Goldie, a little girl in the 1884 children's book Sweet Girl Goldie: A Wonder Story of Butterfly Time, an 1884 butterfly-shaped children's book by American author Lizbeth Bullock Humphrey
- Little Goldie, a character in the 1893 play Little Goldie, or the Child of the Camp, by Charles O. Willard
- Goldie's Inheritance: A Story of the Siege of Atlanta, a 1903 historical novel by Louisa M. Whitney
- Goldie, a baby gargoyle in The Sandman comic book by Neil Gaiman
- Goldie, a character played by Jean Harlow in the 1931 American film Goldie
- Goldie, a character in the graphic novel Sin City.
- Goldie, the title character of the 1922 American film Goldie Green
- Goldie, a character in the Disney Junior show Goldie & Bear
- Goldie Gold, a teenage heiress in the 1981 American animated television series Goldie Gold and Action Jack
- Goldie LaFarge, a character played by Lili Damita in the 1933 American comedy film Goldie Gets Along
- Goldie Luxe, from the toy line Lalaloopsy
- Goldie the Sunshine Fairy, from the book series Rainbow Magic
- Goldie McQueen, a character in the British soap opera Hollyoaks
- Goldie O'Gilt, duck character from DuckTales (1987 TV series), DuckTales (2017 TV series), and the comic series Uncle Scrooge.
- Goldie O'Keefe, a hippie character on the 1960s American television program The Smothers Brothers Comedy Hour
- Marigold "Goldie" Vance, the main character of the comic book series Goldie Vance
- Goldie, the title character of the Apple TV+ animated series Goldie by Emily Brundige

== See also ==
- Golda (disambiguation)
- Goldie (disambiguation), for people known by the nickname "Goldie"
- Goldy Gopher, mascot of the University of Minnesota
- Goldie (nickname)
- Goldie (surname)
