= Goldie (surname) =

Goldie is a surname. Notable people with the surname include:

- Alanna Goldie (born 1994), Canadian fencer
- Alexander Goldie (1896–1918), Scottish footballer
- Alfred Goldie (1920–2005), English mathematician
- Annabel Goldie (born 1950), Scottish politician
- Archie Goldie (1874–1953), Scottish footballer
- C. F. Goldie (1870–1947), New Zealand artist famous for his paintings of early Maori
- Charles Goldie (cricketer) (1826–1886), English clergyman and cricketer, father of John
- Dan Goldie (born 1963), American tennis player
- David Goldie (politician) (1842–1926), Mayor of Auckland City and Member of Parliament in New Zealand, father of C. F. Goldie
- David Goldie (priest) (1946–2002), priest in the Church of England
- Edward Goldie (1856–1921), English ecclesiastical architect, son of George Goldie
- George Goldie (architect) (1828–1887), English ecclesiastical architect
- George Taubman Goldie (1846–1925), European explorer
- Grace Wyndham Goldie (1900–1986), BBC producer
- Jim Goldie (born 1940), Scottish professional footballer
- John Goldie (1849–1896), British rower
- John Goldie (botanist) (1793–1886), Scottish-born botanist
- John Francis Goldie (1870 – 1955) Methodist missionary
- Malcolm Goldie (1883–?), Scottish footballer, coach at the Massachusetts Institute of Technology
- Michael Goldie (1932–2013), British actor
- Noel Goldie (1882–1964), British Member of Parliament
- Peter Goldie (1946–2011), British philosopher
- Rosemary Goldie (1916–2010), Australian Catholic theologian
- William Goldie (1878–1952), Scottish footballer, brother of Archie
