= Marigold =

Marigold may refer to:

- Marigold (color), a yellow-orange color

It may also refer to:

== Plants ==
- In the genus Calendula:
  - Common marigold, Calendula officinalis (also called pot marigold, ruddles, or Scotch marigold)
- In the genus Tagetes:
  - African marigold or Aztec marigold, Tagetes erecta
  - French marigold, Tagetes patula
  - Mexican marigold, Tagetes lucida
  - Signet marigold, Tagetes tenuifolia
- Cape marigold (disambiguation), referring to several species
- Desert marigold, Baileya multiradiata
- Marsh marigold, Caltha palustris
- Corn marigold, Glebionis segetum
- Tree marigold, Tithonia diversifolia

== Arts and media ==
=== Film and television ===
- Marigold (1938 film), a British film
- Marigold (2007 film), a Bollywood romantic comedy
- Marigold (2024 film), a Kannada thriller
- Marigold Gregson, a character on the British drama series Downton Abbey
- Character Winston Spencer Churchill in the British television series In Sickness and in Health, nicknamed "Marigold"

=== Music ===
- Marigold (band), a Swedish indie-pop band
- Marigold (Mari Hamada album), 2002
- Marigold (Pinegrove album), or the title track, 2020
- "Marigold" (Aimyon song), 2018
- "Marigold" (Dave Grohl song), 1992
- "Marigold", a song from the album Bloom by Caligula's Horse
- "Marigold", a song from the album The Caitiff Choir by It Dies Today
- "Marigold", a piano piece by Billy Mayerl
- "Marigold", a song from the album Millionaires and Teddy Bears by Kevin Coyne
- "Marigold", a song by The Ocean Blue
- "Marigold", a song from the album Periphery III: Select Difficulty by Periphery
- "Marigold", a song from the album Air for Free by Relient K
- "Marigold", a song by Sugarplum Fairy
- "Messiah Complex III: Marigold", a song from the album Virus by Haken

=== Other media ===
- "Marigolds" (short story), by Eugenia Collier
- Dream Star Fighting Marigold, referred to simply as "Marigold"; a Japanese women's professional wrestling promotion founded in 2024
- Marigold Farmer, a character in the webcomic Questionable Content

== People ==
- Marigold (given name)
- Marigold Linton (born 1936), Native American cognitive psychologist
- Marigold Southey (born 1928), an Australian philanthropist who served as Lieutenant-Governor of Victoria from 2001 to 2006

== Places ==
- Marigold, Illinois, an unincorporated community
- Marigold mine, a gold mine in Valmy, Nevada

== Ships ==
- HMS Marigold, various ships of the British Royal Navy
- HMT Marigold, a trawler requisitioned by the Royal Navy in the Second World War; see List of requisitioned trawlers of the Royal Navy (WWII)
- USS Marigold (1863), used by the Union Navy during the American Civil War
- USAHS Marigold, a US Army hospital ship during World War II
- USLHT Marigold, a 1890 lighthouse tender which served on the Great Lakes

== Other ==
- Marigold (color), a yellow-orange color
- Operation Marigold, a secret attempt to reach a compromise solution to the Vietnam War
- Marigold, a Japanese joshi wrestling promotion
- Marigold (rubber gloves)
