= Golda =

Golda is a term of which the various forms stem from Proto-Germanic gulþą "gold", and may refer to:

== Geography ==
- Golda, the original name of Gouda, South Holland, Netherlands
- Golda, the earliest known name for the river Gouwe in the Netherlands
- Ramat Golda neighborhood in Haifa, Israel
- Sderot Golda Meir (Route 436 (Israel–Palestine)), regional arterial road in Israel and the West Bank

== People ==
Golda (Yiddish: גאָלדע or גאָלדאַ, Hebrew: גוֹלְדָה) is a Yiddish-language female name. Notable people with this name include:

- Mascha Kaléko (1907–1975), born Gołda Małka Aufen, German-language poet
- Olga Bancic (1912–1944), born Golda Bancic, Jewish Romanian communist and member of the French Resistance during World War II
- Golda Fried (born 1972), novelist, writer, and poet
- Golda Gorbman (1887–1959), spouse of Kliment Voroshilov
- Golda Glickman, better known as Roxana Sand or Roxanne Carmine, erotic dancer and fan dancer
- Abigail Golda Hoffman (born 1947), Canadian track and field athlete
- Lea Golda Holterman (born 1976), Israeli photographer
- Golda Krolik (1892–1985), Detroit activist and organizer
- Golda Lishansky, better known as Rachel Yanait Ben-Zvi (1886–1979), Israeli author and educator, and a leading Labor Zionist
- Golda Madden (1886–1960), American actress
- Golda Marcus (born 1983), swimmer from El Salvador
- Golda Meir (1898–1978), fourth Prime Minister of Israel
- Golda Rosheuvel (born 1970), Guyanese-British actress and singer
- Mary Golda Ross (1908–2008), Native American female engineer
- Golda Selzer (1910–1999), academic and pathologist at Groote Schuur Hospital, and co-founder of SHAWCO
- Golda Schultz (born 1983), South African operatic soprano
- Gołda Stawarowska, woman in the Warsaw Ghetto boy photograph
- Gołda Tencer (born 1949), Polish actress and singer
- Ireneusz Golda (born 1955), Polish athlete
- Natalie Golda (born 1981), Olympic water polo player

== Other ==
- Golda (film), 2023 film starring Helen Mirren as Golda Meir
- A Woman Called Golda, 1982 American film, starring Ingrid Bergman as Golda Meir
- Golda's Balcony, play by William Gibson
- Golda's Balcony, 2019 American film
- Bust of Golda Meir, outdoor bronze sculpture in New York City
- Goldaş, Turkish jewellery fabricator
- Golda chingri, Bangladesh and India for Macrobrachium rosenbergii

== See also ==
- Goldie (disambiguation)
- Goldy (disambiguation)
- Gulda (disambiguation)
