= Marigold (given name) =

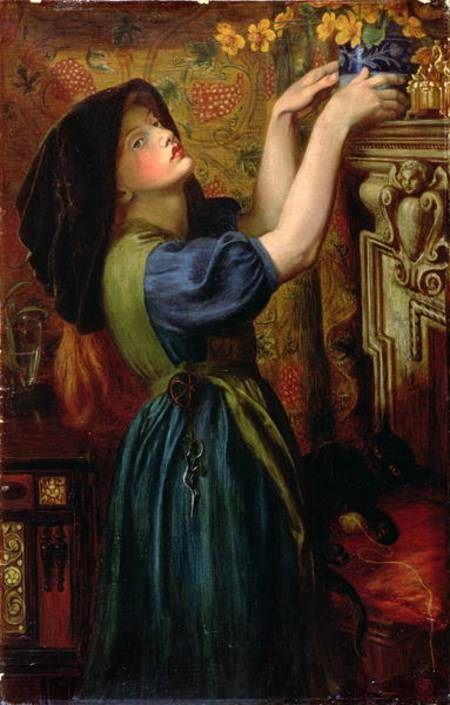
- "Marigolds" by Dante Gabriel Rossetti (1873)
- Gender: Feminine

Origin
- Origin: English
- Meaning: marigold

Other names
- Nickname: Goldie
- Related names: Mary

Marigold is an English name taken from the common name used for flowers from different genera such as Calendula or Tagetes, among others.

The flower name is derived from Mary's gold and was used in reference to the Virgin Mary. Marigolds are often incorporated into "Mary gardens" that are planted with flowers associated with Mary.

The name came into use along with other flower and plant names that became popular for girls in English-speaking countries in the 1800s and early 1900s. It has recently increased in usage in part due to a child character on the popular TV series Downton Abbey. It has ranked among the top 1,000 names used for newborn girls in both the United States and Canada since 2021.

== Notable people ==
- Marigold Churchill (1918–1921), daughter of Winston Churchill
- Marigold Linton (born 1936), American cognitive psychologist and member of the Morongo Band of Cahuilla Mission Indians
- Marigold Santos (born 1981), Filipino-Canadian artist
- Marigold "Goldie" Semple (1952–2009), Canadian actress
- Marigold Southey, (born 1928), Australian philanthropist, served as Lieutenant-Governor of Victoria from 2001 to 2006

== See also ==
- Marigold (disambiguation)
