= Goldie (disambiguation) =

Goldie (born 1965) is a British musician (real name Clifford Price).

Goldie may also refer to:

== People and fictional characters ==
- Goldie (given name), including a list of people and fictional characters
- Goldie (surname), a list of people
- Goldie (nickname), a list of people

=== Stage name or ring name ===
- Goldie Hill (1933–2005), American country music singer
- Genya Ravan, lead singer of Goldie and the Gingerbreads
- Goldie Ray, later stage name for Ursula Hayden (born 1966)
- Goldie Rogers, ring name of former professional wrestler David Sherwin (1950–2012)
- Goldie Semple (1952–2009), Canadian actress

== In entertainment ==
- Goldie (band), a British band
- "Goldie" (song), a 2012 single by ASAP Rocky
- Goldie, Dickey Betts' 1957 Gibson Les Paul Goldtop guitar
- Goldie (DC Comics), a comic book character in Neil Gaiman's The Sandman
- Goldie (film) (1931), starring Spencer Tracy
- Goldie Wilson and Goldie Wilson III, characters from the movies Back to the Future and Back to the Future Part II
- Goldie, a character in the children's movie Rock-a-Doodle
- Goldie O'Gilt, a Disney character in the Donald Duck universe
- Goldie Foxx, animated keyboardist of the virtual band Studio Killers

== Other uses ==
- Cape Goldie, a cape in Antarctica
- Goldie (Cambridge University Boat Club), Cambridge University Boat Club's reserve crew
- Goldie (dog), one of the "pets" on the British children's TV series Blue Peter
- Goldie (eagle), that made a famous escape from the London Zoo in 1965
- Callanthias legras, a fish also known as the goldie and African splendid perch
- Goldie (restaurant), Philadelphia chain by chef Michael Solomonov

== See also ==
- Golde Flami, Argentine actress
- Golden (disambiguation)
- Goldy (disambiguation)
- John Senhouse Goldie-Taubman, Manx politician
- Goldee's Barbecue, restaurant in Fort Worth, Texas
