= Goulburn (disambiguation) =

Goulburn is a city in New South Wales, Australia.

Goulburn may refer also refer to:

== Australia ==
- Goulburn Airport, New South Wales
- Goulburn Islands, in Northern Territory
- Goulburn River, Victoria
- Goulburn River (New South Wales)
- Goulburn Street, Sydney
- Goulburn Valley, Victoria
- Electoral district of Goulburn, New South Wales
- Electoral district of Goulburn (Victoria)
- Parish of Goulburn, New South Wales
- Shire of Goulburn, Victoria
- Goulburn railway station

== Other uses ==
- Goulburn (Mars)
- Goulburn (surname)
- HMAS Goulburn, a 1940 Bathurst-class corvette

== See also ==
- Goulburn Watsford (1859–1951), Australian cricketer
