= John Goldie =

John Goldie may refer to:

- John Goldie (philosopher) (1717–1811), friend of the poet Robert Burns
- John Goldie (botanist) (1793–1886), Scottish-born botanist and author
- John Goldie (barrister) (1849–1896), English rower and barrister
- Jack Goldie (John Wyllie Goldie, 1889–1958), Scottish footballer
- John Goldie (rugby league), rugby player for the Carluke Tigers
