= Lucie Chan =

Canadian artist

Lucie Chan (born 1975) is a visual artist born in Guyana, who is now based in Canada. Her artwork employs various techniques including large-scale drawings-based installation and animation focusing on such themes as cultural confusion, the transient nature of human connections, and shape-shifting identity.

== Biography ==
Chan was born in Georgetown, Guyana and later moved to Halifax, Nova Scotia in Canada. Chan believes that she doesn't feel attached to any one culture, as she lived in Guyana then Canada, and is part of Chinese, Black, East Indian and Portuguese cultures. Chan received a Bachelor of Fine Arts from the Alberta College of Art and Design and a Master of Fine Arts from the Nova Scotia College of Art and Design in 2001. She lives and works in Halifax, Novia Scotia, where she is Associate Professor of Drawing in the Division of Art at Nova Scotia College of Art and Design since 2023. Previously she held the position of Associate Professor at Emily Carr University of Art and Design.

== Awards ==
Chan received the VIVA Award as one of the three distinguished individuals working in the field of visual arts in 2020.

She was a nominee for the Sobey Art Award in 2010.

== Exhibitions ==
=== Solo exhibitions ===
- 2022 - To Be Free, Everything You Most Hate and Fear (The Blue Building Gallery, Halifax, Nova Scotia)
- 2022 – How to be 57 (Oxygen Art Centre, Nelson, BC)
- 2020 – To Be Free, Everything You Most Hate and Fear (Centre A, Vancouver, BC)
- 2018 – How to Be 57 (Kitchener Waterloo Art Gallery, Kitchener, Ontario)
- 2007 – Lucie Chan: Between, and in tears, Art Gallery of Nova Scotia.
- 2006 – tears, and in Between (Foreman Art Gallery of Bishop's University, Sherbrooke, Quebec)
- 2002 – Something to Carry (Mount Saint Vincent Art Gallery, Halifax, Nova Scotia)
- 2001 – Mek Back Shaky Baby Mek Back (Anna Leonowens Gallery, Nova Scotia College of Art and Design, Halifax, Nova Scotia)

=== Group exhibitions ===
From July 2023 to January 2024, Chan created a large-scale sketchbook project The Library of Continuous Image-Making in collaboration local community members of all ages. The project was located in the BMO Learning Centre. It invites visitors to co-developed the assorted handmade sketchbooks with mixed media art supplies which transformed images into multi-layered hybrid visuals.

Chan was one of the eight artists presented by The Blue Building Gallery at Art Toronto 2023.

Chan and Marigold Santos collaborated to create the artist exhibition Attachments, which was shown at the Richmond Art Gallery in 2014. Her works were part of Assemble in Art Gallery of Sudbury in 2016.

Lucie Chan work was exhibited in a 3-person exhibition Drawn Positions: Geographies and Communities at the National Gallery of Canada in 2008.

== Curatorship ==
Lucie Chan was one of the curators of 2017 Nocturne Festival, held annually in Nova Scotia.
