= Charles Goldie =

Charles Goldie may refer to:

- C. F. Goldie (Charles Frederick Goldie, 1870–1947), New Zealand artist
- Charles Goldie (cricketer) (1826–1886), English clergyman and cricketer
