= Goldy =

Goldy may refer to:

== People ==
=== Nickname or given name ===
- Paul Goldschmidt (born 1987), American baseball first baseman
- Goldy Goldstein (1904–1948), American football player
- Dalvir Singh Khangura (born 1982), Indian politician
- Goldy Notay, British-Canadian film actress

=== Surname ===
- Craig Goldy (born 1961), American musician
- Faith Goldy (born 1989), Canadian far-right, white nationalist political commentator
- Jagdeep Kamboj Goldy, Indian 21st century politician
- Luv Kumar Goldy, Indian 21st century politician
- Purnal Goldy (1937-2009), American baseball player

=== Stage name ===
- Hannah Goldy, American mixed martial artist Hannah Eliza Goldschmidt (born 1992)
- Goldy Locks, American musician Moon Shadow (born 1979)
- Goldy McJohn, Canadian keyboard player John Raymond Goadsby (1945–2017)
- Goldy (rapper), American rapper Mhisani Miller (born 1969)

== Fictional characters and mascots ==
- Goldy Gopher, University of Minnesota mascot
- Goldy, a recurring character in the American 1950s television series Yancy Derringer
- Goldy, a character in the film A Rage in Harlem

== See also ==
- Golda (disambiguation)
- Goldie (disambiguation)
- Gulda (disambiguation)
