= Jack Goldie =

Scottish footballer

Personal information
- Full name: John Wyllie Goldie
- Date of birth: 10 October 1889
- Place of birth: Hurlford, Scotland
- Date of death: 26 February 1958 (aged 68)
- Place of death: Middlesex, England
- Height: 5 ft 7 in (1.70 m)
- Positions: Centre half; right half

Senior career*
Years	Team	Apps	(Gls)
- Hurlford Thistle
1908–1911	Fulham	31	(0)
1911–1912	Glossop		
1912–1920	Bury		
1916–1917	→ Kilmarnock (loan)	69	(2)
1919	→ Kilmarnock (loan)	11	(0)
1920–1923	Kilmarnock	92	(3)
1922	→ Clyde (loan)	0	(0)
- * Club domestic league appearances and goals

John Wyllie Goldie (10 October 1889 – 26 February 1958) was a Scottish footballer who played as a centre half or right half.

He began his career with junior club Hurlford Thistle before moving to England with Fulham of the Football League Second Division, where he briefly played alongside older brother Bill (another brother, Archie, was also a professional). A move to Glossop in 1911 led to move playing time, and he soon moved on to Bury. During World War I, when official English competitions were halted but the Scottish Football League continued, Goldie was loaned to Kilmarnock. At that time there were also two other locally-born players named Goldie at Killie, Alex and George, who were brothers but not closely related to Jack's family. (Note: The 'John Litster files' list 11 appearances made in the 1918–19 season as having been made by winger George Goldie, but the FitbaStats website attributes these to Jack, and its itemised match reports indicate the relevant player was deployed at centre half.)

He returned to Bury when the English league restarted in 1919–20, then signed for Kilmarnock on a permanent basis. In 1922 he was loaned to Clyde purely to play in the Glasgow Cup final. His career was brought to an end in 1923 (although he was already 33 by that stage) when he was implicated in a match fixing scandal from three years earlier when it was found Bury had accepted payments from Coventry City to prevent the latter's relegation, and Goldie was banned for life along with several others.

== See also ==
- Match fixing in English football
