= Goldie Boathouse =

Boathouse of the Cambridge University Boat Club

Coordinates: 52°12′40.27″N 0°7′50.92″E

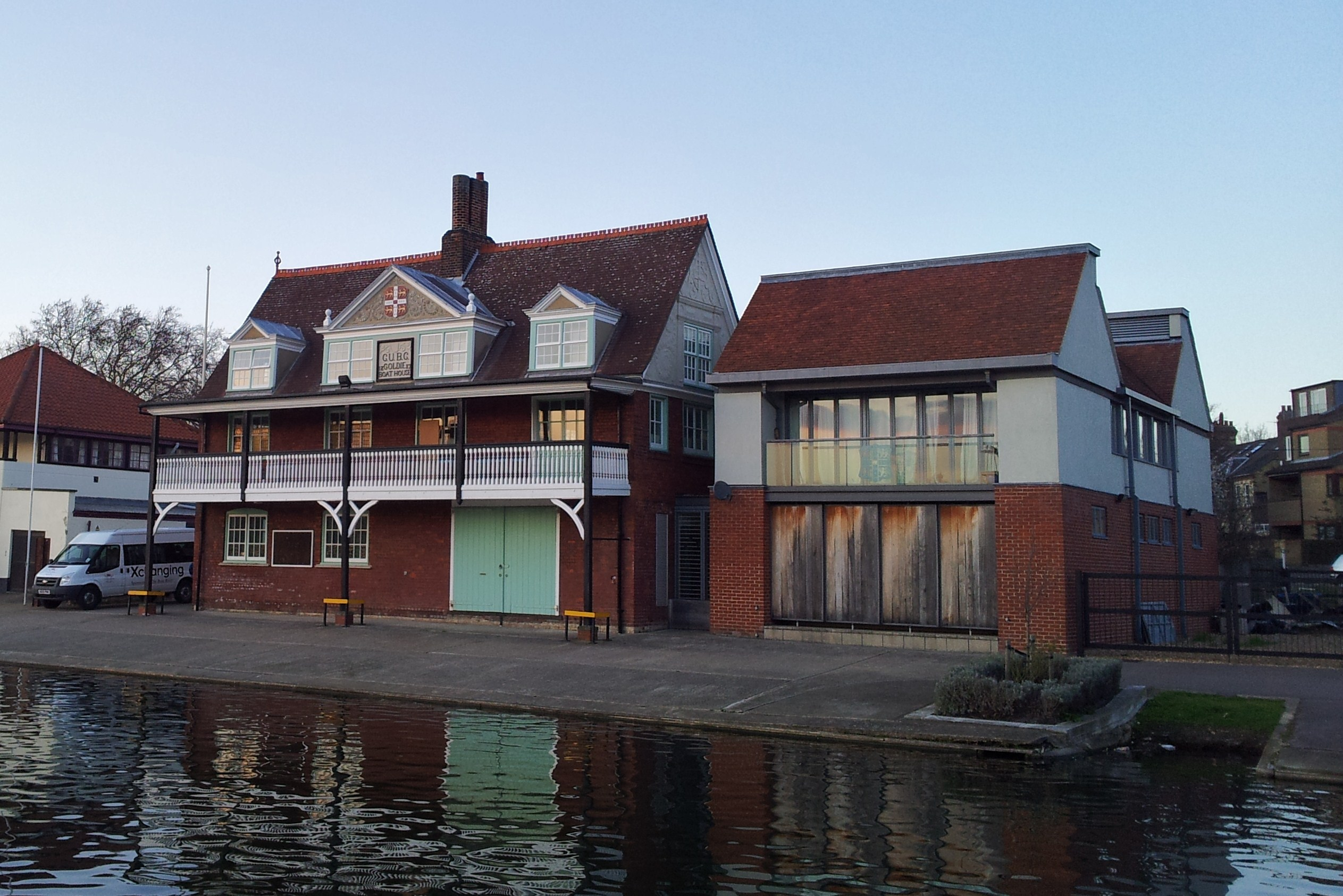
Goldie Boathouse at the University of Cambridge

Goldie Boathouse is the fitness and administrative base of Cambridge University Boat Club (CUBC), located on the River Cam in Cambridge, England. It was originally the University boathouse and was named after CUBC's President J. H. D. Goldie, who also gave his name to the University's second crew.

The boathouse was formerly used for the storage of boats. This is no longer the case, and the area that used to be the boat bays has now been converted to a gymnasium where ergometer and weight training takes place. The administrative offices and a physiotherapy treatment centre are also based there, as is the Club's Sports Science Research and Development programme. The boathouse includes a rowing tank for indoor training on water.

The boathouse is the oldest extant boathouse in Cambridge, built in 1882, and is listed Grade II on the National Heritage List for England.
