= Lizbeth B. Humphrey =

American illustrator

Elizabeth B. Humphrey
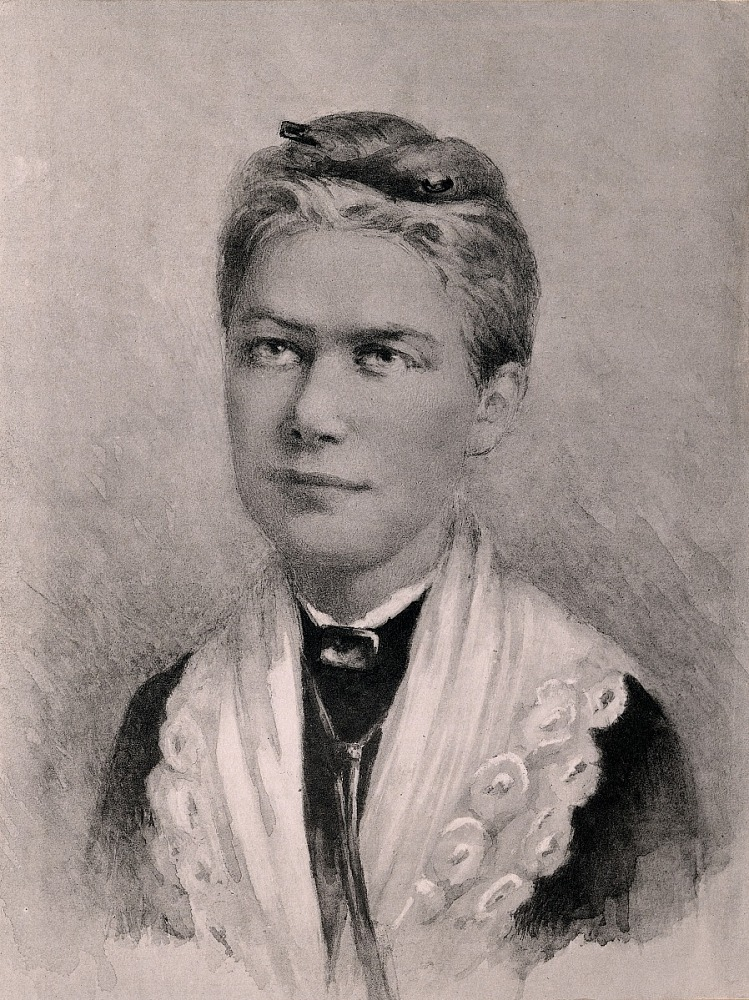
- Drawing of Humphrey by Mary J. Jacques
- Born: 1841; Hopedale, Massachusetts
- Died: April 3, 1889; Hamilton, Bermuda

Elizabeth Bullock Humphrey (May 13, 1841–April 1889), also credited as Lizbeth, Lizzie, or L. B. Humphrey, was an American illustrator active in the 19th century. Humphrey and other women from Cooper Union are considered some of the first women to receive recognition as illustrators in the United States.

After attending Cooper Union, Humphrey illustrated for various magazines and books, including both children's and general magazines. She designed greeting cards, gift books, and other paper goods for publishers L. Prang and Company—where she was a staff illustrator—and Lee and Shepard. After her death, Prang published a memorial book of her artwork.

== Early life and work ==
Humphrey was born on May 13, 1841, in Millbury or Hopedale, Massachusetts. Her mother was Almira B. Humphrey and her father was William H. Humphrey. Her ancestors were a part of the early settlers of Barrington, Rhode Island. She had an adopted sister named Marjorie. In 1849, her family moved to Hopedale, Massachusetts, where Humphrey continued to live for the majority of her life.

In the 1860s, Humphrey studied drawing and painting at Cooper Union in New York City. She used the newly developed technique of photogravure in her artwork, building her illustration style off of it. According to the book Art Work: Women Artists and Democracy in Mid-Nineteenth-Century New York, she "became a trendsetter for the publishing industry" due to her use of the technique. Along with several other Cooper Union students from the 1870s, Humphrey became one of the first women to "achieve recognition" as an illustrator in the United States.

== Career ==
In 1869, four of her illustrations were included in the book Beyond the Mississippi by Albert D. Richardson, including drawings of Colorado, Nebraska, Texas, and Utah.

In the 1870s and onward, Humphrey made accompanying illustrations for various magazines and books. Her illustrations were included in the children's magazines Wide Awake, Oliver Optic's Magazine, and St. Nicholas. She illustrated the frontispiece of the book Sally Williams, the Mountain Girl (c. 1872). Her illustrations for the book Wild Flowers and Where They Grow were first printed in Wide Awake magazine, before being reprinted in book form around 1882. According to the Chicago Tribune in 1885, Humphrey was "well known by the excellence of her magazine illustrations".

In the 1880s, Humphrey worked as an illustrator on the staff of L. Prang and Company (L. Prang & Co.). While working for the company, her art was published as chromolithograph prints in gift books and greeting cards. She also created holiday cards for Prang, including Christmas, Easter, and Valentine's Day cards. She created a folding calendar for the publisher in 1887, titled "The Meeting of the Months". In the 1880s, Prang also published an American literature series of high-end cards based on designs by Humphrey.

Humphrey also illustrated for the publisher Lee and Shepard, creating works for their series of holiday poems as well as their books. In 1880, they published New Songs for Little People with woodcut illustrations by Humphrey, and Mrs. Follen's Little Songs, designed in the same style. Around 1883, they printed her illustrations in the book Abide With Me. Around 1888, they published a series of "petite" books, which included two books illustrated by Humphrey: Oh, Why Should the Spirit of Mortal be Proud? and The Breaking Waves Dash High.

She also made books for the publisher D. Lothrop & Co.; around 1881, the gift book The Old Oaken Bucket was published by the company. It included illustrations by Humphrey along with a musical ballad. Around 1883, they published The Poet and the Children, a collection of poetry that included illustrations by Humphrey and others.

In 1884, she published Sweet Girl Goldie: A Wonder Story of Butterfly Time, a butterfly-shaped children's book about a little girl named Goldie who frees her uncle's butterfly collection. Also around 1884, Humphrey moved to Boston, Massachusetts. In 1885, one of her illustrated cards was shown in an exhibit of Christmas cards at the Art Institute of Chicago.

== Death ==
Humphrey died unexpectedly of "consumption" around April 3 or 6, 1889 in Hamilton, Bermuda. A week later, her funeral was held in Hopedale, Massachusetts at the Unitarian Church. Representatives from both Lee and Shepard and L. Prang & Co. attended the funeral.

After her death that year, L. Prang & Co. announced that the last of her works made for the company would be published during the winter holidays. Prang & Co. also created and published a memorial book of her work, titled Child Life: A Souvenir of Lizbeth B. Humphrey. The book contained colored prints of her illustrations, as well as a portrait drawing of Humphrey, sketched by Mary J. Jacques.

== Works ==
- The Mountain Girl (c. 1872), by Mrs. E. D. Cheney
- Abide with Me (1877), by Henry Francis Lyte, engraved by John Andrew & Son
- New Songs for Little People (1880), by Mary E. Anderson
- Little Songs (1880), by Eliza Lee Follen
- Home, Sweet Home (1880), original poetry by John Howard Payne
- The Old Oaken Bucket (c. 1881)
- Wild Flowers and Where They Grow (c. 1882) by Amanda Bartlett Harris
- Merry Thoughts (1882), by M. Jacques
- Ring Out, Wild Bells (1882), by Alfred Tennyson, as part of Lee and Shepard's "Golden Floral" series
- He Giveth His Beloved Sleep (1882), by Elizabeth Barrett Browning, as part of Lee and Shepard's "Golden Floral" series
- The Poet and the Children (c. 1883), compiled by Matthew Henry Lothrop
- Sweet Girl Goldie: A Wonder Story of Butterfly Time (1884)
- Oh, Why Should the Spirit of Mortal be Proud? (c. 1888), by William Knox
- The Breaking Waves Dash High (c. 1888), by Felicia Hemans

== Gallery of illustrations ==
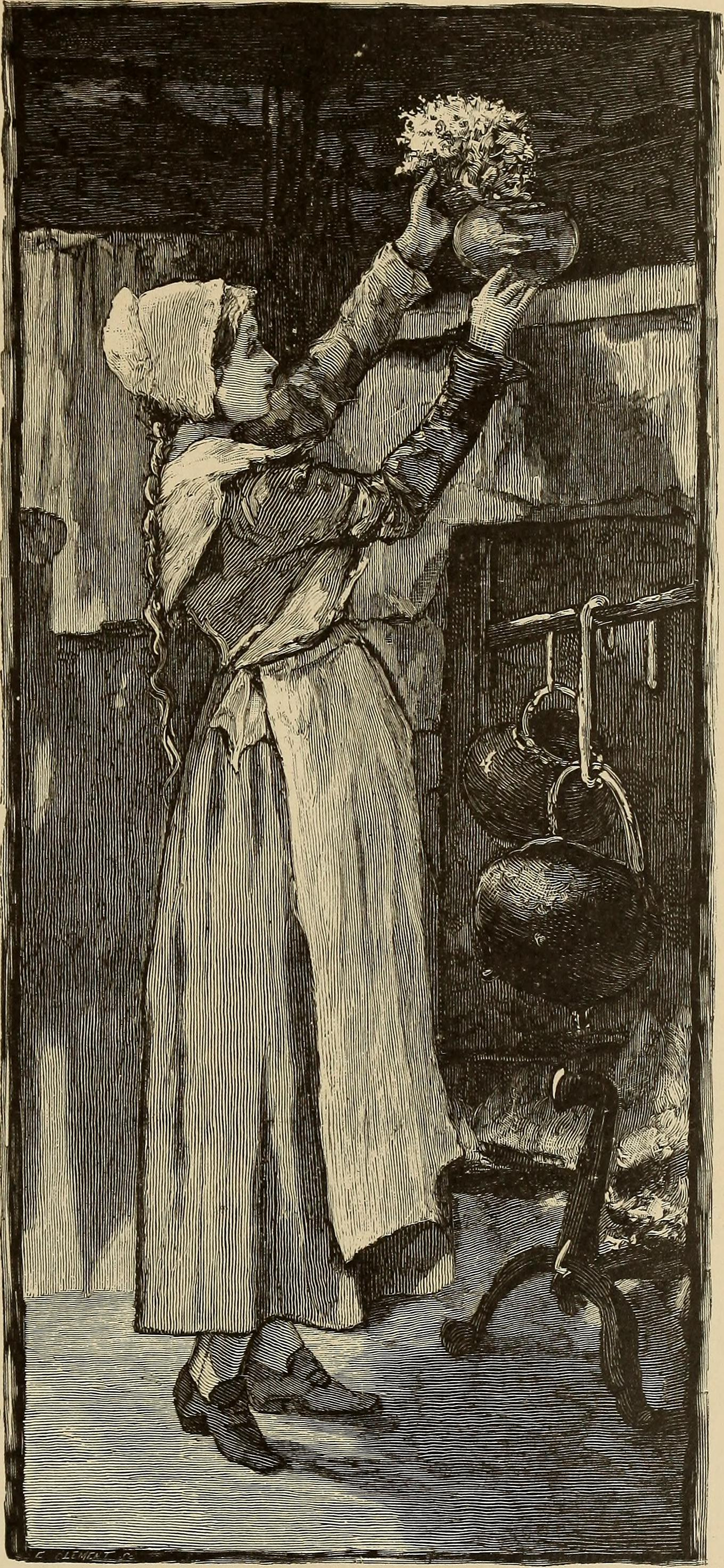
"A Pilgrim Daughter", from Amanda Bartlett Harris' book Wild Flowers and Where They Grow

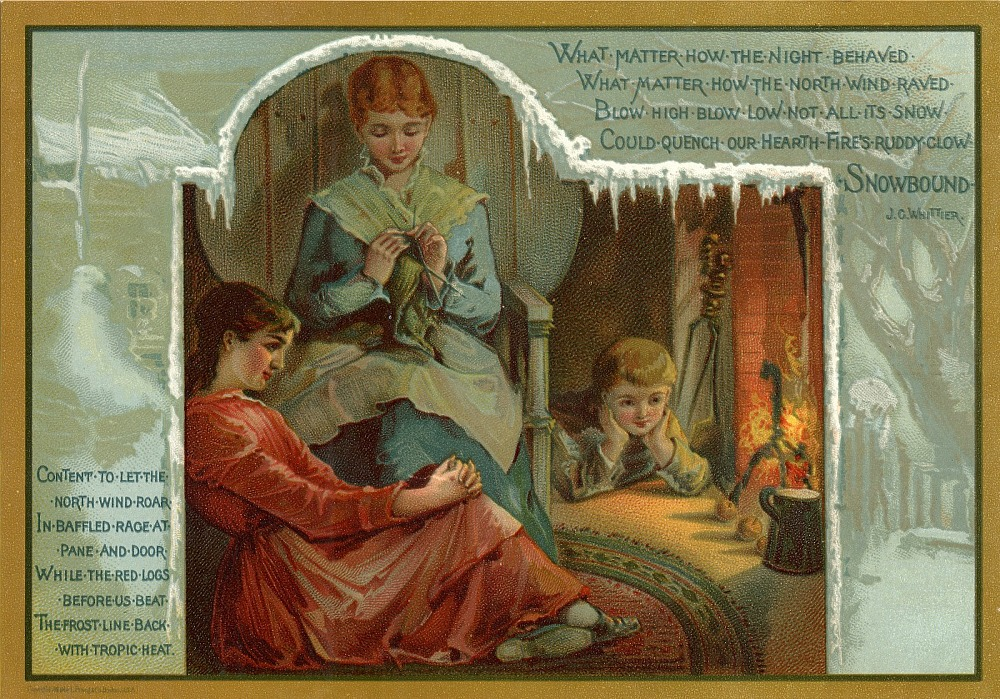
Christmas card published by L. Prang and Company

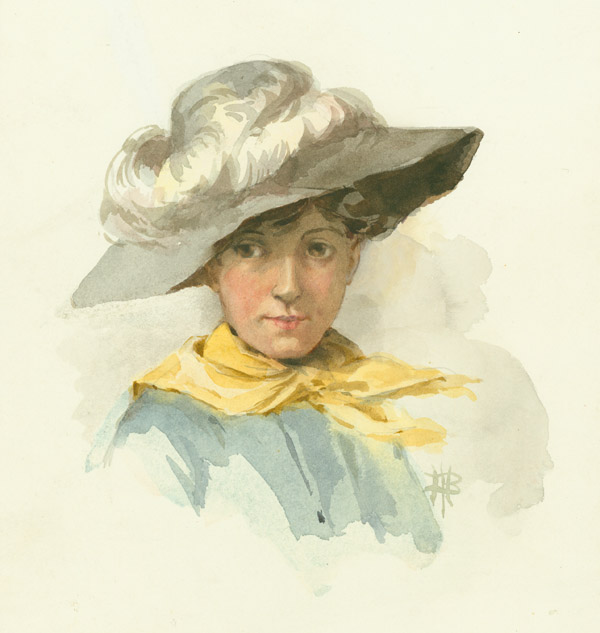
Watercolor painting sent in a letter to "Rev. Dr. C.H. Strickland"

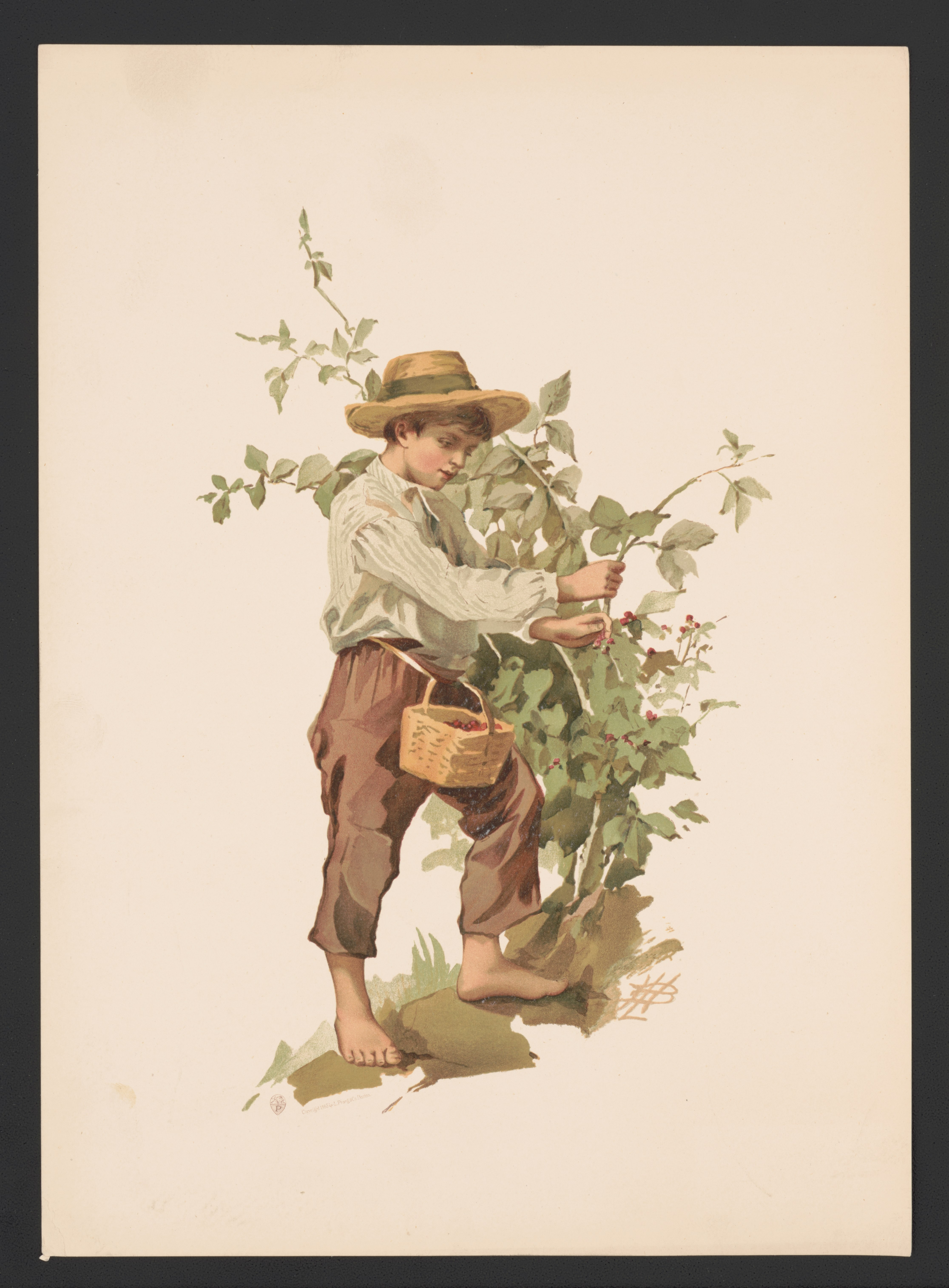
Chromolithograph print of a study
