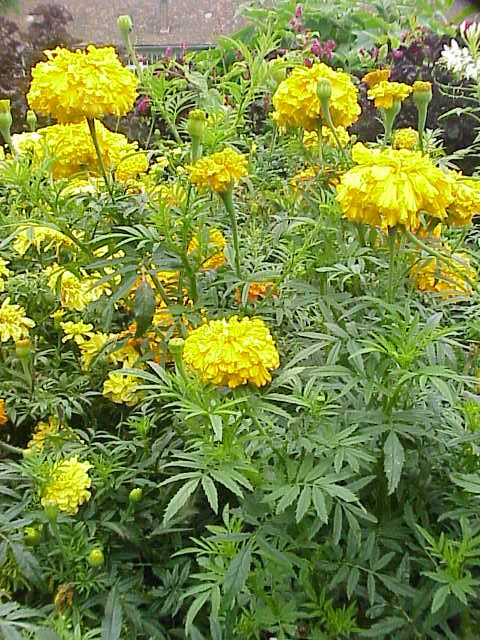

Scientific classification
- Kingdom: Plantae
- Clade: Tracheophytes
- Clade: Angiosperms
- Clade: Eudicots
- Clade: Asterids
- Order: Asterales
- Family: Asteraceae
- Genus: Tagetes
- Species: T. erecta

Binomial name
- Tagetes erecta L.

Synonyms
- List: Tagetes corymbosa Sweet; Tagetes ernstii H.Rob. & Nicolson; Tagetes excelsa Soule; Tagetes heterocarpha Rydb.; Tagetes major Gaertn.; Tagetes patula L.; Tagetes remotiflora Kunze; Tagetes tenuifolia Millsp.

= Tagetes erecta =

Species of flowering plant

Tagetes erecta, the Aztec marigold, Mexican marigold, big marigold, cempaxochitl or cempasúchil, is a species of flowering plant in the genus Tagetes native to Mexico and Central America. Despite being native to the Americas, it is often called the African marigold. In Mexico, this plant is found in the wild in the states of México, Michoacán, Puebla, Veracruz and Guerrero.

This plant reaches heights of between 20 and 90 cm (7.9 and 35.4 in). The Aztecs gathered the wild plant as well as cultivating it for medicinal, ceremonial and decorative purposes; it was introduced to Europe after the Spanish conquest of the Aztec Empire and colonization and became widely cultivated commercially with many cultivars in use as ornamental plants, and for the cut-flower trade.

Some authorities regard Tagetes patula (the French marigold) as a synonym of Tagetes erecta.

== Names ==
The Spanish name cempazúchitl (or cempasúchil) comes from the Nahuatl cempohualxochitl ("twenty flower") – 20 (cempohualli) is the base of the Aztec vigesimal counting system, consequently a symbol of completion including in life reflected in measurements like their calendrical daycount. The English name marigold comes from their petals' arrangement resembling Calendula officinalis, also called "Mary's gold" or "marigold".

In Thai, it is called ดาวเรือง daao reuaang meaning "glittering star".

== Description ==
It is a herbaceous annual or perennial plant whose height ranges from 30 to 110 cm. The root is cylindrical, pivoting, with a fibrous and shallow branching system. The stem is striated, sometimes ridged, smooth or slightly with villi, cylindrical, oval and herbaceous to slightly woody, with resin channels in the bark, which are aromatic when squeezed. Opposite leaves at the bottom alternate at the top, up to 20 cm long, pinnate, composed of 11 to 17 leaflets, lanceolate to linear-lanceolate, up to 5 cm long and 1.5 cm wide, acute to acuminate, serrated to sub-holders, the lower ones of each leaf frequently setiform (in the form of threads), the superiors are sometimes completely setiform; with abundant round glands.

The main characteristic of the flowers is that they are grouped in small heads or in solitary inflorescences, on peduncles up to 15 cm long, they are liguladas of yellow colors to red. In the flowers of the disc: 150 to 250 in the simple heads, in the doubles it shows different degrees of transformation in ligules, yellow to orange corollas, of 8 to 10 mm in length. The fruits and seeds are: linear achenes 7 to 10 mm long, smooth or slightly covered with stiff hairs at the corners. It has a long flowering period extending throughout the summer and fall. It reproduces easily by seeds.

== Distribution and habitat ==
Although native to Mexico, they are also found in the countries of Central America and the Caribbean: Belize, Bolivia, Colombia, Costa Rica, Cuba, Ecuador, El Salvador, Guatemala, Guyana, Honduras, Jamaica, Nicaragua, Panama, Puerto Rico, the Dominican Republic and Venezuela.

In their wild form they are found in the Balsas basin and western Mexico and live in diverse types of ecosystems, such as tropical deciduous forests, thorny forests, cloud forests and pine-oak forests. In the wild, it is found as a getaway in heavily disturbed places at altitudes of 800–2300 m.

As an introduced species (cultivated) it can be found in China, India, Zambia, Zimbabwe, South Africa and Australia.

== History ==
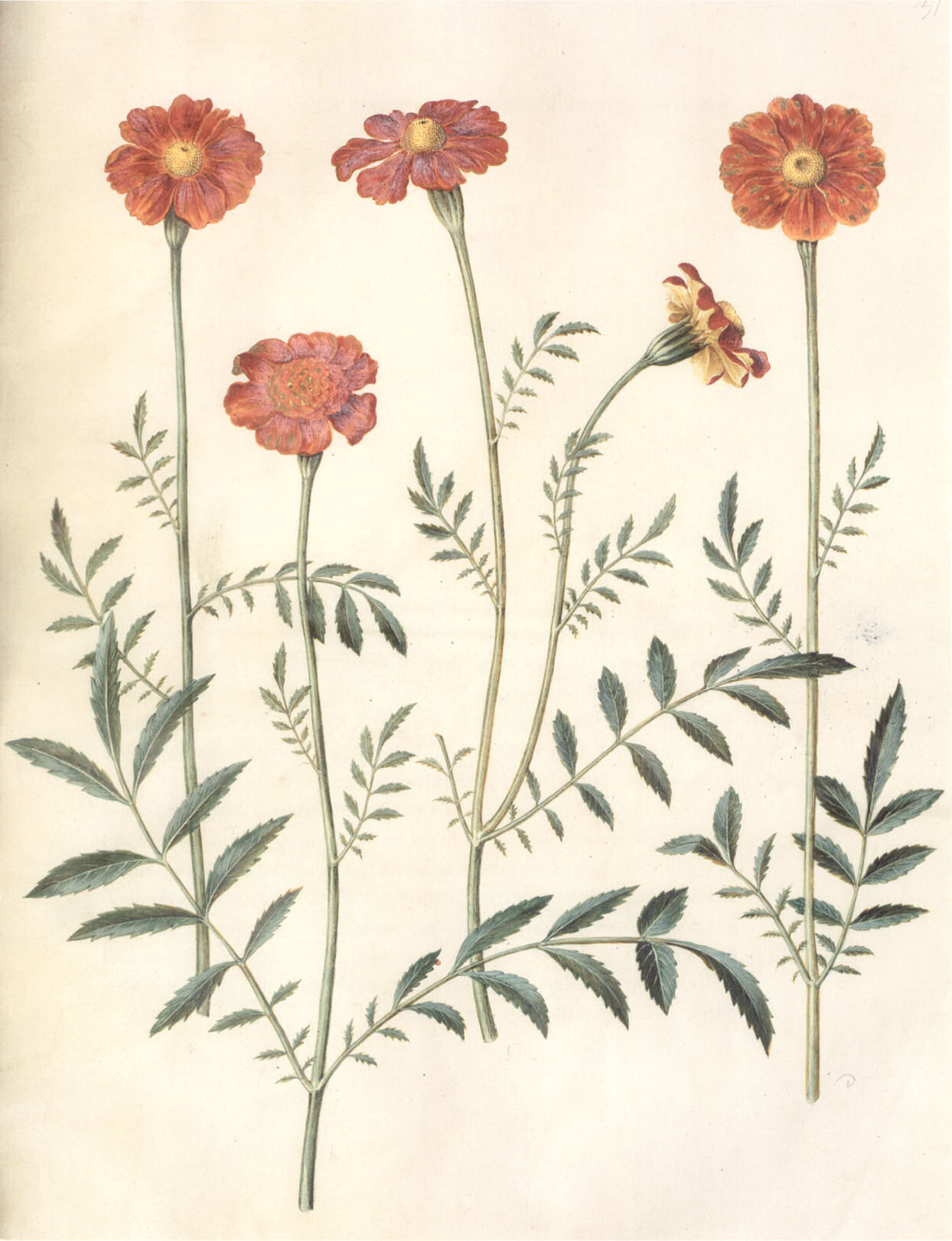
Botanical illustration.

The archaeological record of the use of Tagetes erecta among pre-Hispanic civilizations is not as abundant as in the case of other species of the same family. For example, it has been possible to establish the ceremonial use among the Mexica of T. lucida as an aromatic plant, which they called yauhtli, through the chemical analysis of the incense burners found in the remains of the Templo Mayor in Mexico City. The Nahuatl term cempoalxóchitl, was used to refer to several species of flowers, which includes T. erecta, T. lucida, T. patula, T. lunulata, T. tenuifolia, T. peduncularis and T. elongata. This complicates the differentiation of one species and another when such a term is used, however, it appears that T. erecta was primarily named by this term.

The identification of T. erecta as some flowers represented in Aztec art, such as those seen in the Coyolxauhqui monolith, as part of the goddess's headdress, has been proposed as a symbol of her sovereignty or her death. They are part of the necklace that a plant deity wears in a vase found in the Templo Mayor, although it could also be T. patula. With the arrival of the Spaniards in Mexico, the documentary record of the ceremonial and medicinal use of T. erecta increased in which the flower is described by Bernardino de Sahagún as:

These flowers are called Cempoalxóchitl; they are yellow and of good smell, and wide and beautiful, that they are born, and others that sow them in the orchards; They are in two ways, some they call females Cempoalxóchitl and they are big and beautiful, and others that are called Cempoalxóchitl males are not so beautiful or so big.

Sahagún also describes, in the same work, that the plant had a role in the rituals of the religious Mexica festival in the month of Teculhuitontli, where the goddess of salt Huixtocíhuatl, whose color was yellow, was celebrated and who offered herself as sacrifice a woman. In the work of the physician Francisco Hernández, it is described that the name cempoalxóchitl received at least seven types of flowers, noting that the term properly described the largest of them and that the Spaniards called it carnation of Indian, also lists its medical properties.

== Cultivation ==
It is widely cultivated and there are many cultivars used in gardening as an ornamental plant. The cultivar 'Inca Orange' has gained the Royal Horticultural Society's Award of Garden Merit.

In Mexico, it is used in the festivities of the Day of the Dead, to decorate altars and tombs; hence the name "flower of the dead". However, since antiquity it is also used for food and medicinal purposes.

== Uses ==
=== Rituals ===
The meaning of the flower's name to the Aztecs makes the cempasúchil symbolic and used in the Día de Muertos celebration every 2 November in Mexico, it is also called the flor de muertos ("flower of the dead"). Water infused with its fragrant essential oil is used to wash corpses in Honduras, and the flower is still commonly planted in cemeteries.

=== Medicine ===
Since prehispanic times, this plant has been used for medicinal purposes. The Cherokee used it as a skin wash and for yellow dye. The pigments of the erect tagetes are due to the presence of carotenoids, of which the main one is lutein, which is associated with the prevention of the development of age-related eye diseases such as cataracts and macular degeneration. The most intense orange tones of the flowers are related to a higher content of carotenoids, especially xanthophyll. Some studies indicate the effectiveness of the latter in the prevention of coronary artery disease, heart attacks, immune response, old age and cancer. In some regions of Mexico it is used in digestive ailments, such as stomach pain, as well as diarrhea, colic, liver problems, bile, vomiting, and indigestion. The plant also has a history of use against intestinal parasites and worms with one study indicating that it has a different mechanism than the anthelmintic drug levamisole. Other uses include respiratory diseases such as colds, flu, bronchitis and nasal congestion as well as gynecological problems.

Antioxidant activity has been discovered in the essential oil of this plant although less than that of α-Tocopherol, possibly attributable to the presence of camphor and methyl eugenol. It is most effective against the nematode species Pratylenchus penetrans.

=== Culinary ===
The ray florets have been used in lettuce salads and other foods to add colour and flavour. The flowers are rich in carotenoids, and are thus used to make food and feed pigments. The dried flower petals, ground to a powder, are used in poultry feed to ensure a good colouration of egg yolks and broiler skin, especially in the absence of well-pigmented yellow maize in the feed. This is still in use today, but now usually in the form of an extract which may have advantages of lower transport and storage cost, better stability and better utilization. It is also used to enhance colouring in crustaceans, such as the Pacific white shrimp (Litopenaeus vannamei).

=== Essential oils ===
The essential oil of the flower contains antioxidants. It may be added to perfumes to infuse an apple scent into them.

=== Dye ===
It is used as a natural dye on textiles.

== Gallery ==
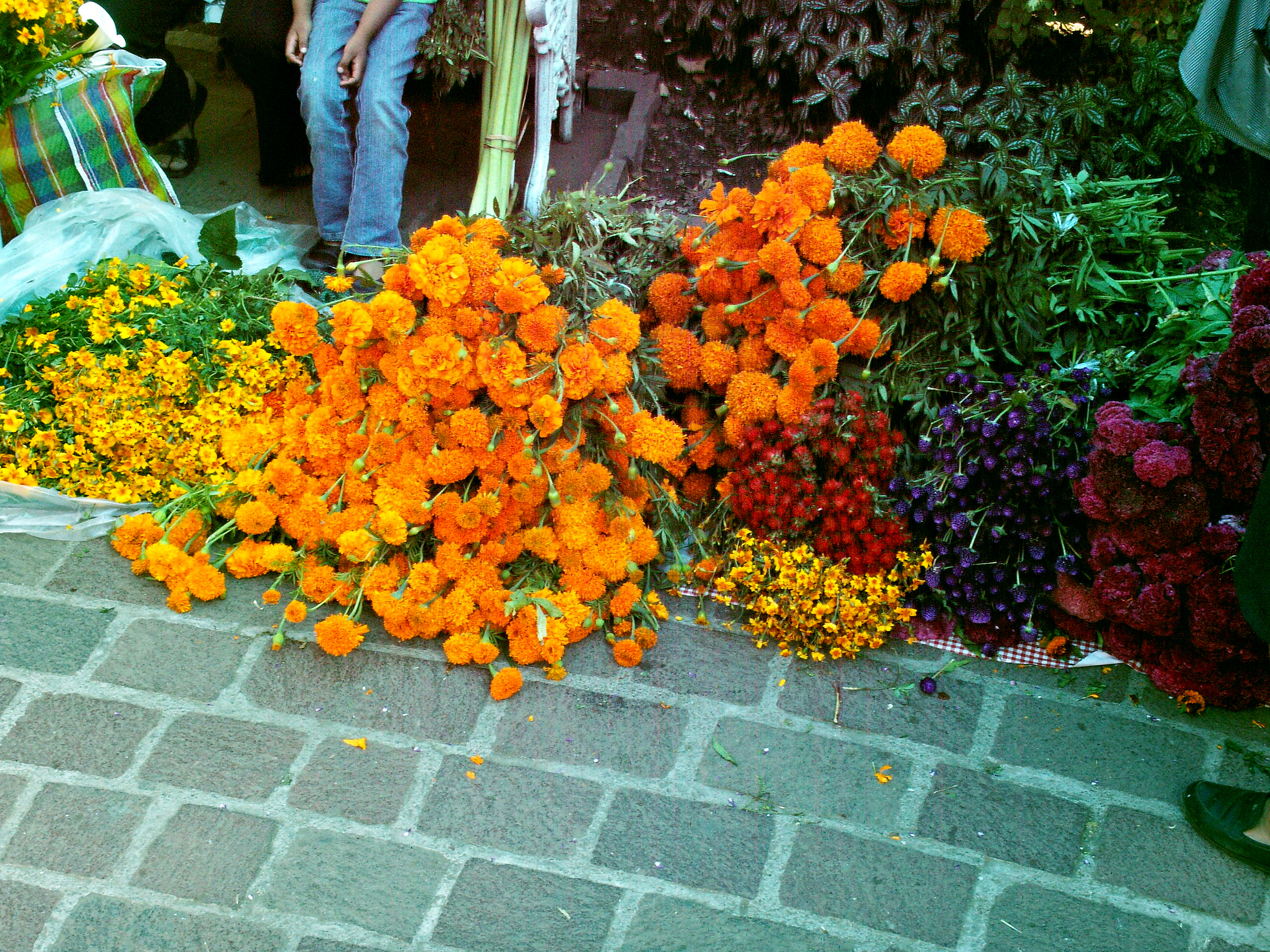
Mexican marigolds (orange, center) in Tepoztlán, Morelos

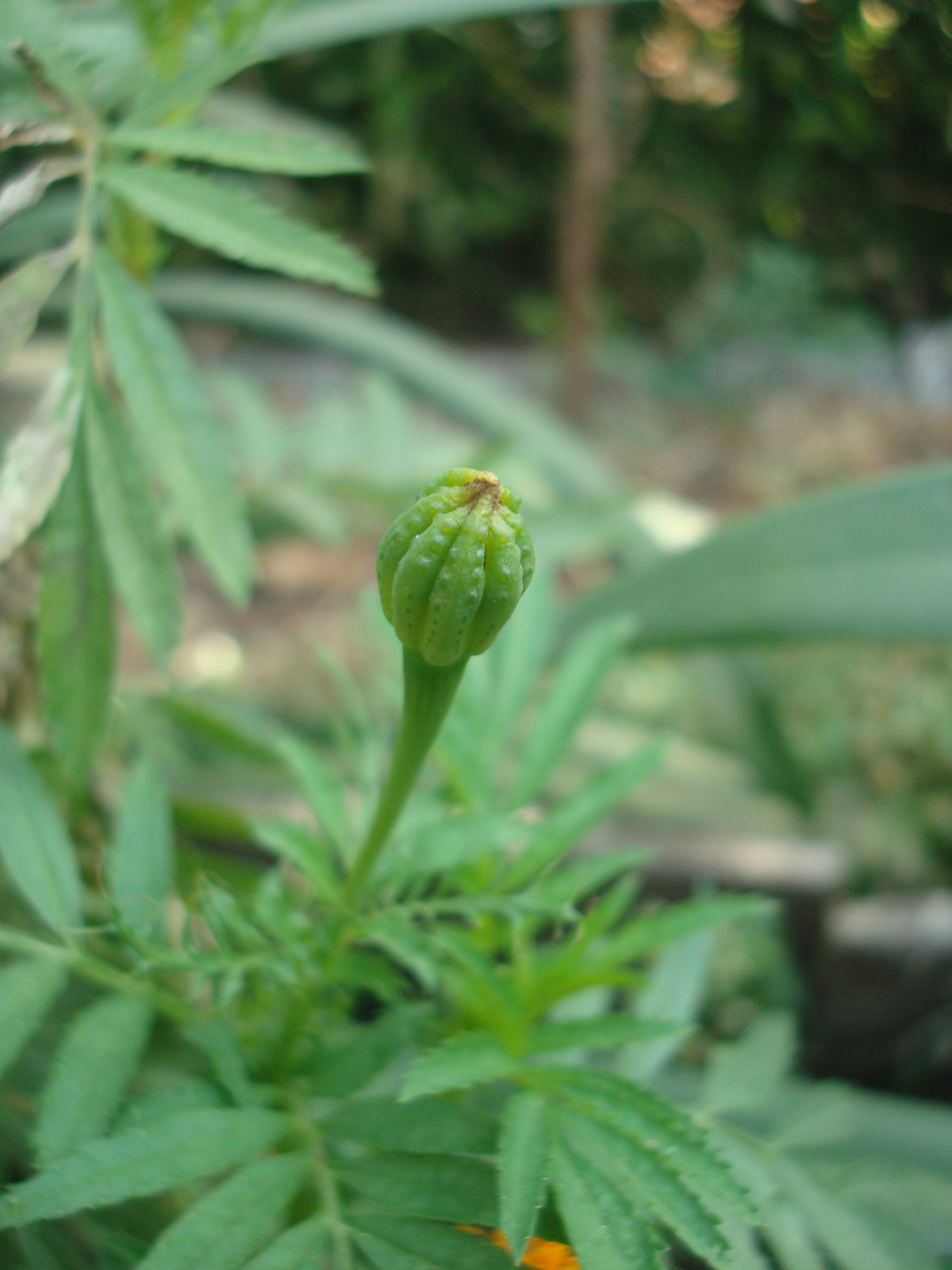
Bud of Tagetes erecta in India

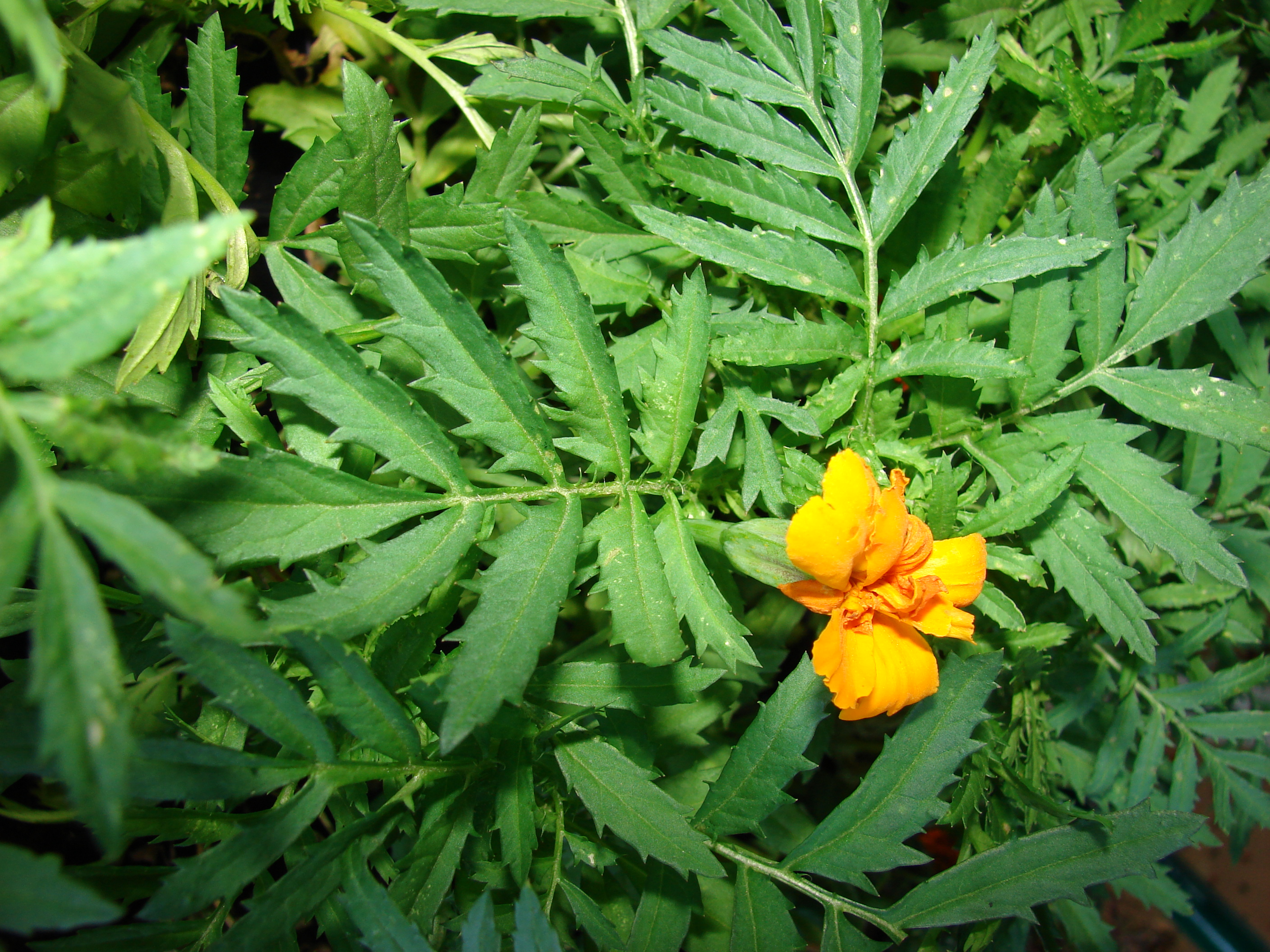
Flower

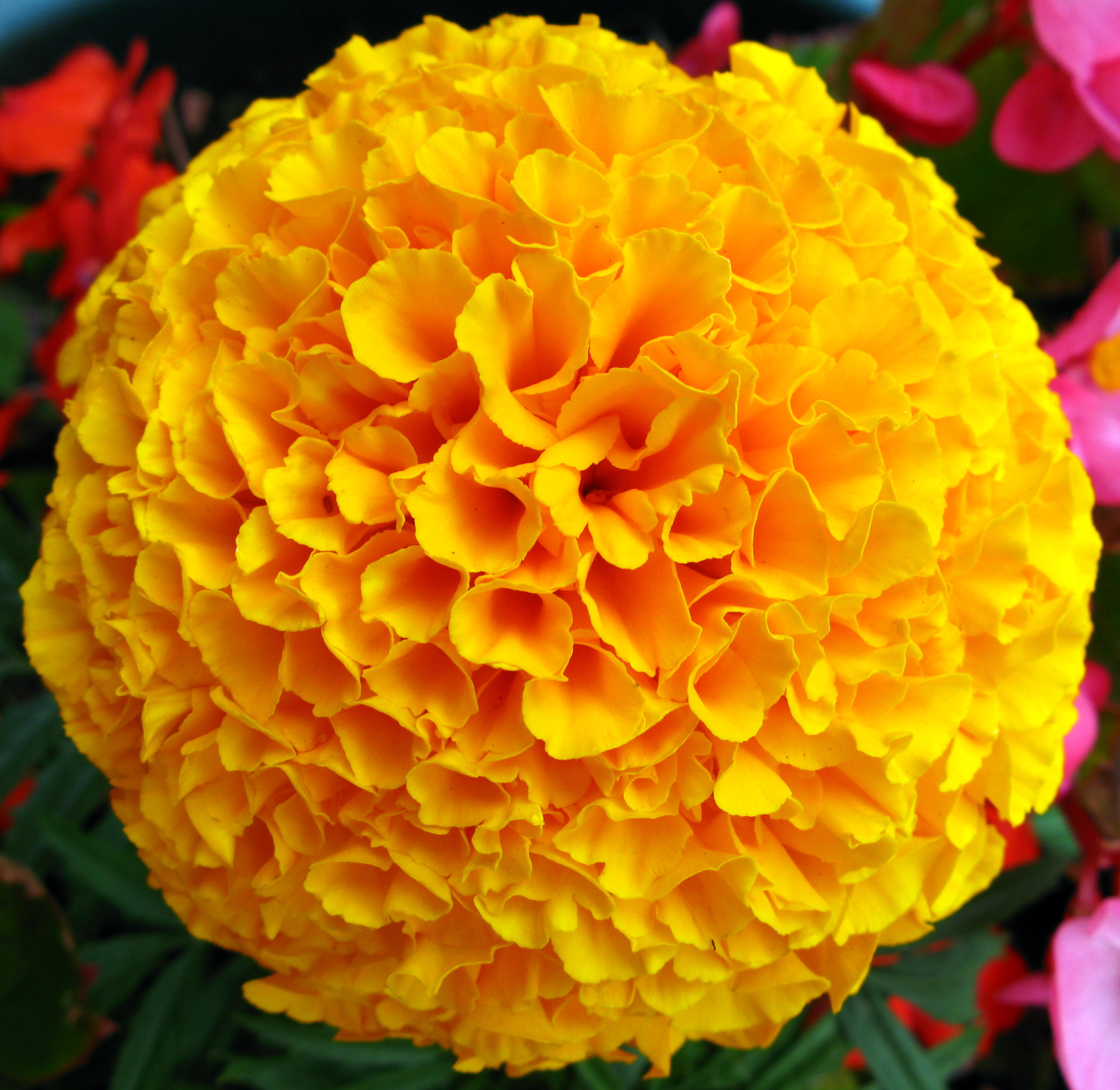
French marigold flower

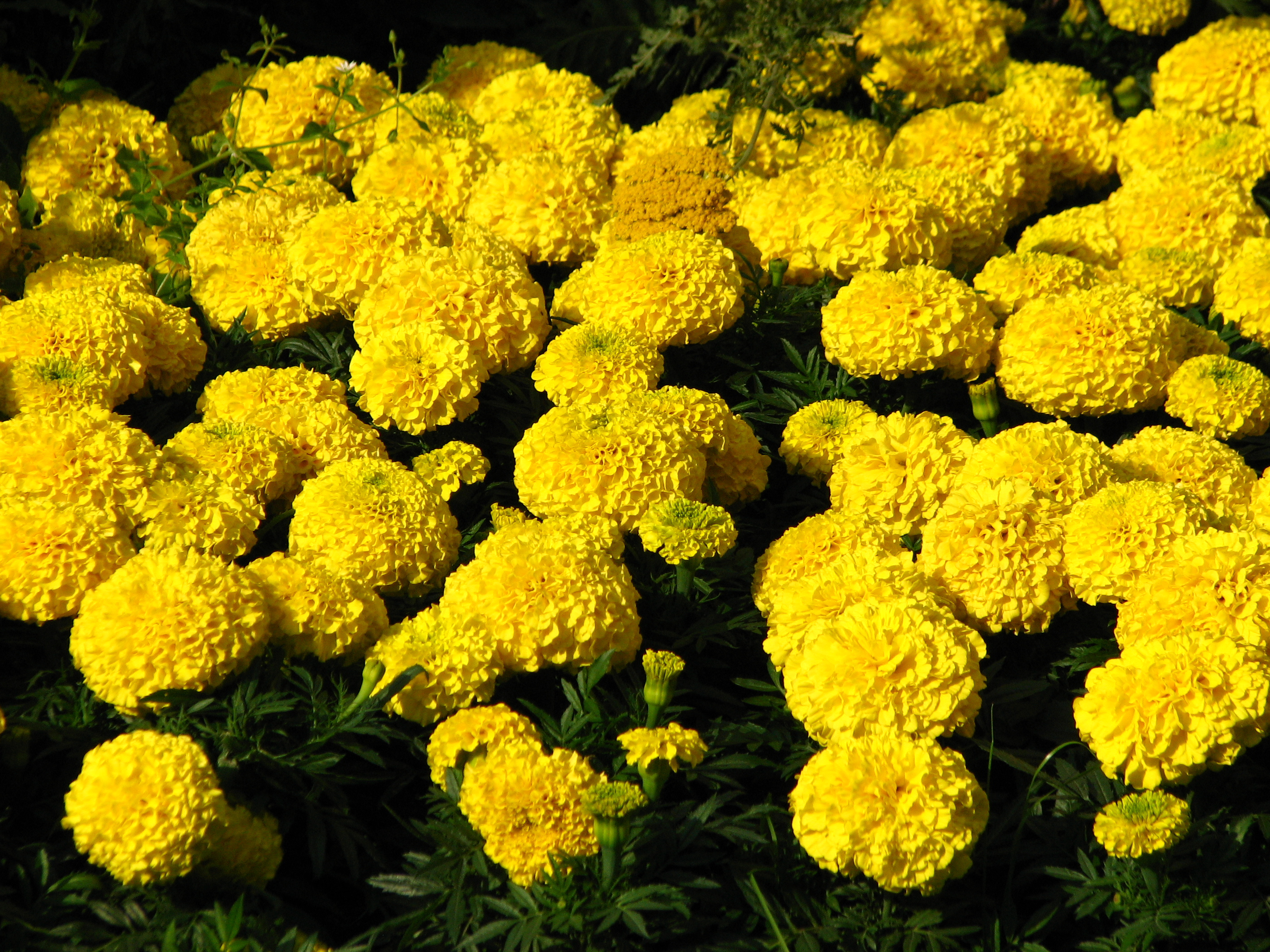
Flowerbed

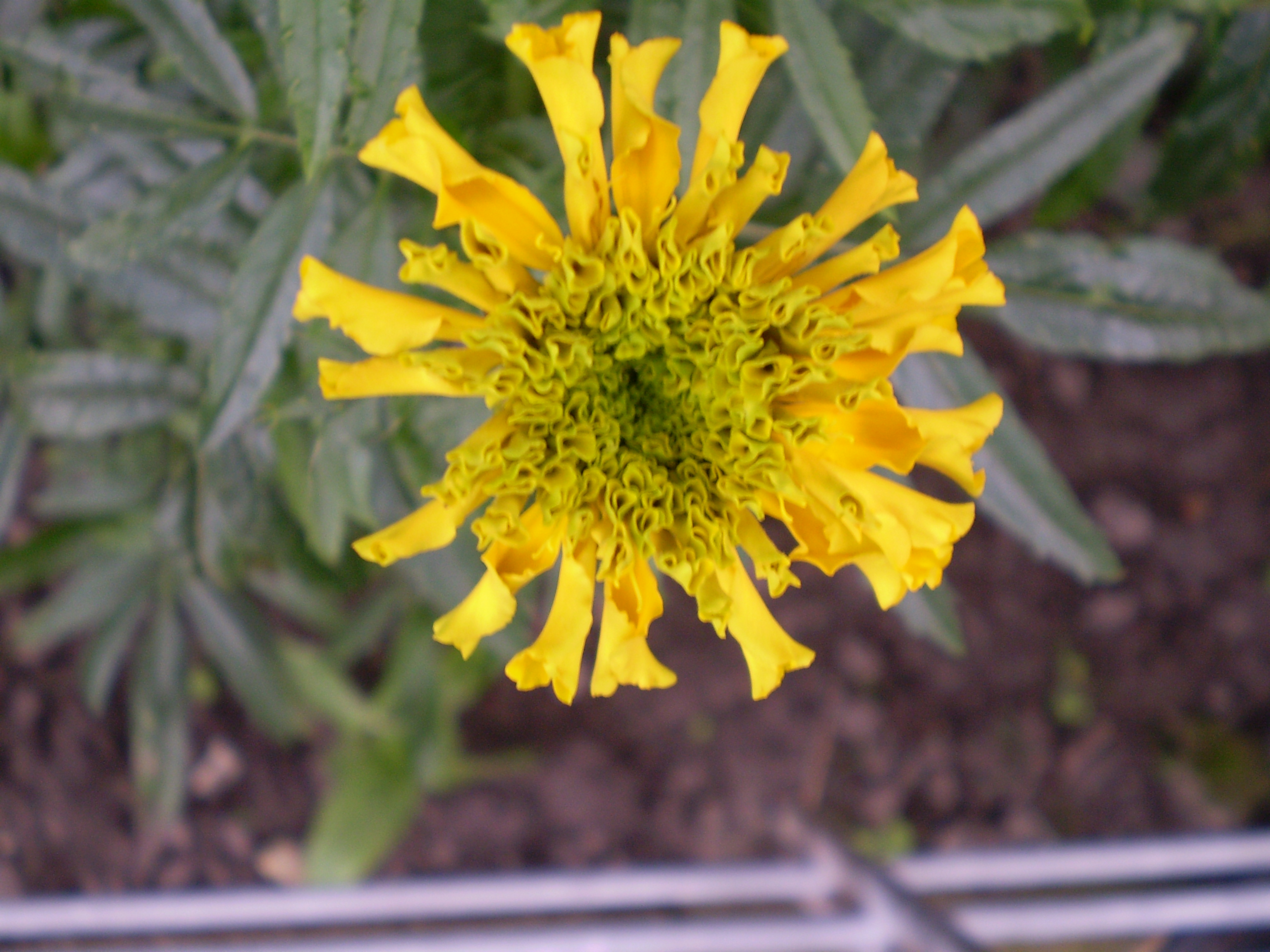
Sprouting flowers

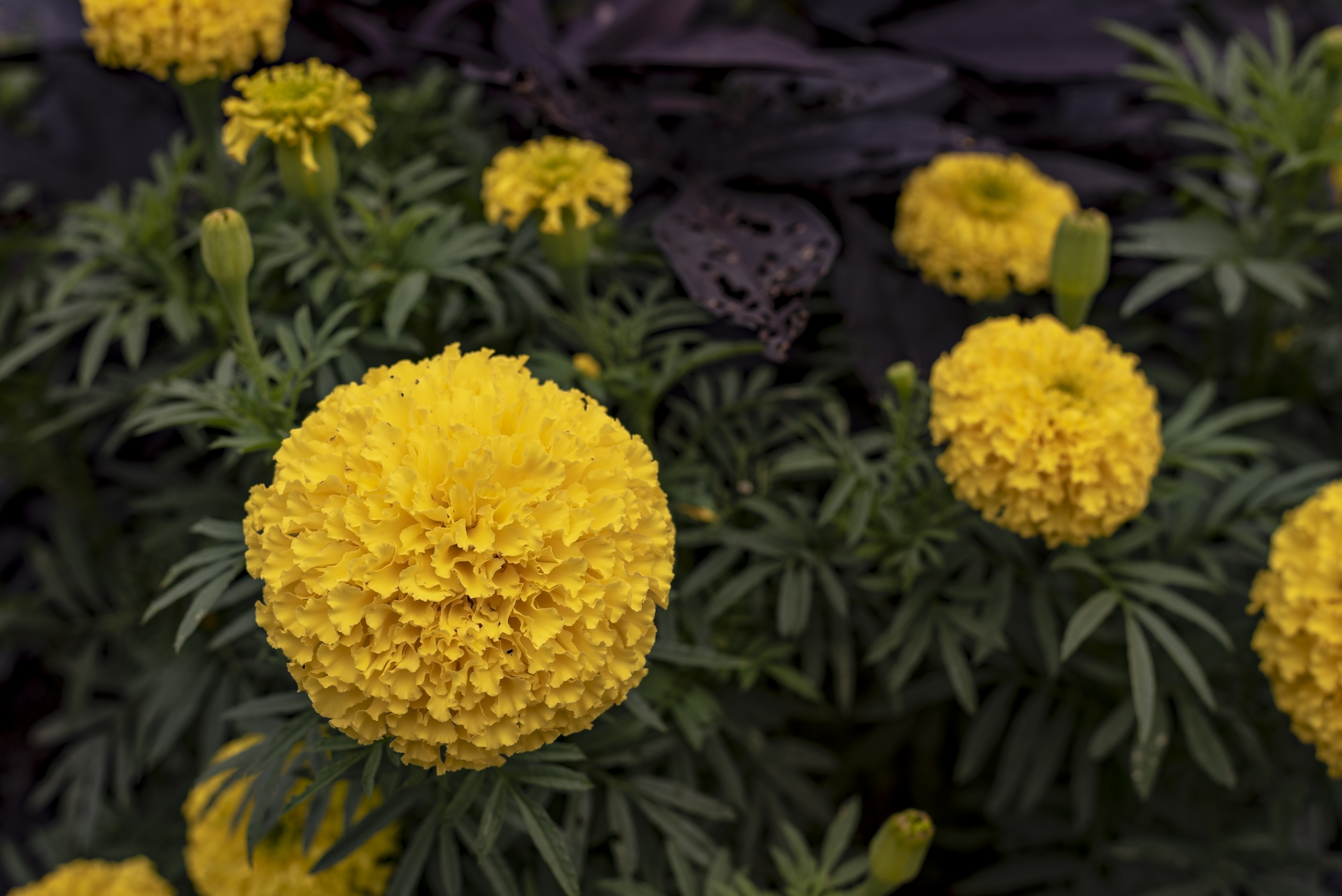
Flower
