= Goulburn (surname) =

Goulburn is a surname, and may refer to:

- Edward Goulburn (MP) (1787–1868), British politician
- Frederick Goulburn (1788–1837), British army officer and politician; brother of Henry and uncle of Meyrick
- Goldie Thomas (full name Mesac William Goulburn Thomas, 1885–1972), Australian cricketer
- Henry Goulburn (1784–1856), British politician and slave owner; brother of Frederick and uncle of Meyrick
- Meyrick Goulburn (1818–1897), English churchman, dean, and headmaster; nephew of Frederick and Henry
- Murray Bourchier (diplomat) (full name Murray Goulburn Madden Bourchier, 1925–1981), Australian public servant and diplomat
