= Lea Golda Holterman =

Israeli photographer

- Born: לאה גולדה הולטרמן; 1976 (age 49–50); Haifa, Israel
- Known for: photography
- Website: leagoldaholterman.carbonmade.com

Lea Golda Holterman (Hebrew: לאה גולדה הולטרמן) is an Israeli photographer.

== Biography ==
Lea Golda Holterman was born in Haifa. She graduated from Department of Photography of Bezalel Academy of Art and Design in Jerusalem in 2007. Holterman made commercial photographs for magazines and newspapers, including Haaretz and Vogue She is mostly known for her Orthodox Eros photography series, in which she depicted several portraits of young Jewish males on the edge of adulthood.

== Exhibitions ==
Lea Golda Holterman had solo exhibitions in Israel, France, Germany, UK and USA, including Museum of Israeli Art in Ramat Gan and Dada Post gallery in Berlin. She received an honour to have a solo exhibition during Photography Festival in 2010 as 2009 year winner. She participated in several group exhibitions, including Herzliya Museum of Contemporary Art, Tel Aviv Museum of Art, Haifa Museum of Art, Petah Tikva Museum of Art. Holterman's works were presented during Athens Photo Festival in 2016.

== Awards ==
Holterman was a Photo Folio Review and Gallery award winner for her Orthodox Eros series at Photography Festival in Arles and received Hasselblad 100 Photographers award.
