= Marigold (band) =

Swedish indie-pop band

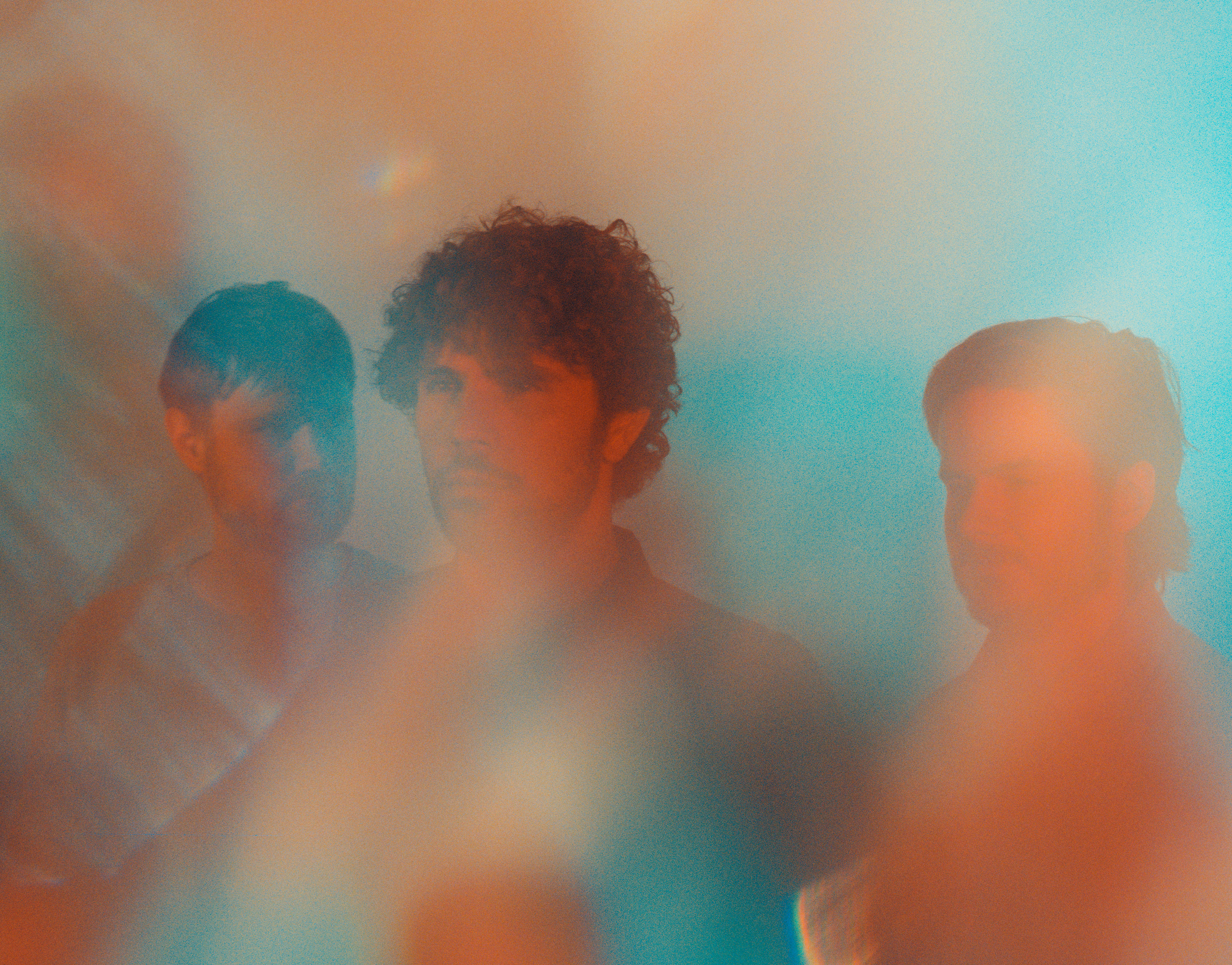
- Marigold 2018

Background information
- Origin: Borlänge, Sweden
- Genres: Electronic pop, Indie-pop, pop
- Years active: 2010-
- Members: Daniel Wallsten; Johan Nordin; Viktor Olsson
- Past members: Rasmus Hååg
- Website: www.marigold.nu

Marigold is a Swedish music indie-pop band from Borlänge and Falun consisting of Daniel Wallsten on vocals and guitar, Johan Nordin on keyboard and Viktor Olsson on drums.

== History ==
Marigold was founded in Borlänge in 2010 and have since then been playing at the SXSW festival in Austin, Texas, Sofar Sounds, Tv4's Nyhetsmorgon. The Peace & Love festival among others. The band released their first album Vagabond in 2011 and their second album Allt kommer bli bra (= everything is going to be fine), which took 4,5 years to finish, in 2015. Their third album "Devenu Noir" was released in 2016.

During the summer of 2018, the band was on a tour called "A 2018 Random Pop-Up Caravan Tour". On the tour the band brought their own portable stage to perform on random spots and locations in Europe.

== Discography ==
=== Albums ===
- 2011 – Vagabond
- 2013 – OCH SÅ KOM REGNET (EP)
- 2015 – Allt kommer bli bra
- 2016 – Devenu Noir

=== Singles ===
- 2011 – "Vagabond"
- 2011 – "You and I Know"
- 2011 – "(Jul) I Vår Familj"
- 2014 - "Allt kommer bli bra"
- 2014 - "Last days of disco"
- 2015 - "Can´t touch me"
- 2016 - "Kalahari"
- 2016 - "All that we have become"
- 2017 - "The Love"
- 2018 - "Revolution"
- 2018 - "Spiralen"
- 2018 - "Capable Of"
- 2019 - "Void"

=== Articles ===
- Nolltvå – Melankoliskt med Marigold
- Dalarnas Tidningar – Marigold firar debuten
- Dala-Demokraten – Organiskt, skitigt, elektroniskt
