= Goldie Watson =

American teacher and city official (1909–1994)

Goldie Watson in 1948

Goldie Watson (1909–1994) was a Philadelphia teacher and city official. During the red scare, she was fired by the School District of Philadelphia over her association with a Communist Party-affiliated teachers' union and later won her job back through a Supreme Court challenge. In 1969, mayor James Tate appointed her the fourth administrator of the Model Cities Program in Philadelphia. She was later appointed Deputy Mayor by Frank Rizzo, becoming the first Black woman to hold that post.

== Early life and teaching career ==
Watson was born in South Carolina on 8 November 1909. Her father was a carpenter. Watson's family moved to North Philadelphia when she was young. Watson taught at Martha Washington Elementary School in Mill Creek at a time when many Philadelphia teachers were involved in organizing the city's first labor union in the profession – Local 192 of the American Federation of Teachers. The AFT began investigating the leadership of its New York and Philadelphia locals in 1939, and it expelled the Philadelphia chapter from the national union in 1941 over the communist sympathies of its membership. On 17 February 1954, Watson was called before the House Unamerican Activities Committee and questioned over her affiliation with the Communist Party. Watson refused to answer questions about her political affiliations on the basis on the First Amendment, rather than the more commonly invoked Fifth Amendment. Watson wrote to W.E.B. Du Bois, hoping that he would attend her hearing and draw attention to the case, but he was unable to do so. She appealed her firing to the Supreme Court and was awarded her job back along with $17,000 in back pay in 1961.

== Model Cities administrator ==
Watson was head of the "Housewives for Johnson" organization in Philadelphia during the 1964 presidential election. She campaigned for Mayor James Tate and was awarded a job as deputy commissioner in the Department of Records in 1967. In March 1969, Watson was appointed the fourth administrator of the Model Cities Program in Philadelphia. As an administrator, she clashed with the Area Wide Council (AWC), a group of 500 North Philadelphia leaders who sought to establish democratic control over the program. Because her appointment coincided with the election of Richard Nixon, who drastically altered federal antipoverty programs, she was able to consign the AWC to an advisory role and strengthen top-down control over the program. Under her leadership, the program was heavily criticized for its inefficiency. By 1973, the program had spent $700,000 to rehab 19 homes and had lent only $20,000 of the $6 million available for economic development. According to the Department of Housing and Urban Development, the program mismanaged $21 million of its $80 million in funding. In 1973, she faced an investigation for awarding a printing contract to her business partner Raymond Steth, who subcontracted the work and approved payments for work ahead of its completion, which violated city regulations. Watson's mismanagement of the Model Cities program led HUD to threaten to withdraw all funding from Philadelphia unless significant changes were made. As a result, mayor Frank Rizzo ordered the Philadelphia Industrial Development Corporation to reorganize the program, and it was ultimately discontinued in 1974.

== Deputy Mayor ==
Though Rizzo admonished Watson for her conduct as a Model Cities administrator, investigations found that she had done nothing illegal and she retained her position. In February 1974 she was appointed deputy mayor, becoming the highest ranking African American in the Rizzo administration and the first woman deputy mayor in Philadelphia history. Philadelphia Daily News columnist Chuck Stone said that Rizzo chose to appoint her to such a high position because his political career was in jeopardy and he was increasingly unpopular, particularly with Philadelphia's Black community. Watson faced another scandal in 1979 when a former aide was convicted of perjury for saying that she had not told workers in a publicly funded anti-poverty program to do work on Watson's home. Watson, though associated with the scandal, was never accused of any wrongdoing.

== Later life and death ==
Watson left public office along with Mayor Rizzo in 1981. She made a rare public appearance at a Clinton-Gore fundraiser for African American women in 1994, and died on 31 May 1994 at Chestnut Hill Hospital at the age of 84.
