= Goldie (nickname) =

Goldie or Goldy is a nickname of:

- George Cochrane (ice hockey) (1881–1952), Canadian ice hockey player
- Goldie Ghamari (born 1985), Canadian politician
- Goldie Goldthorpe (born 1953), Canadian retired ice hockey player
- Goldie Sayers (born 1982), British javelin thrower
- Goldie Thomas (1885–1972), Australian cricketer
