= Bust of Golda Meir =

Bronze sculpture in Manhattan, New York

Golda Meir
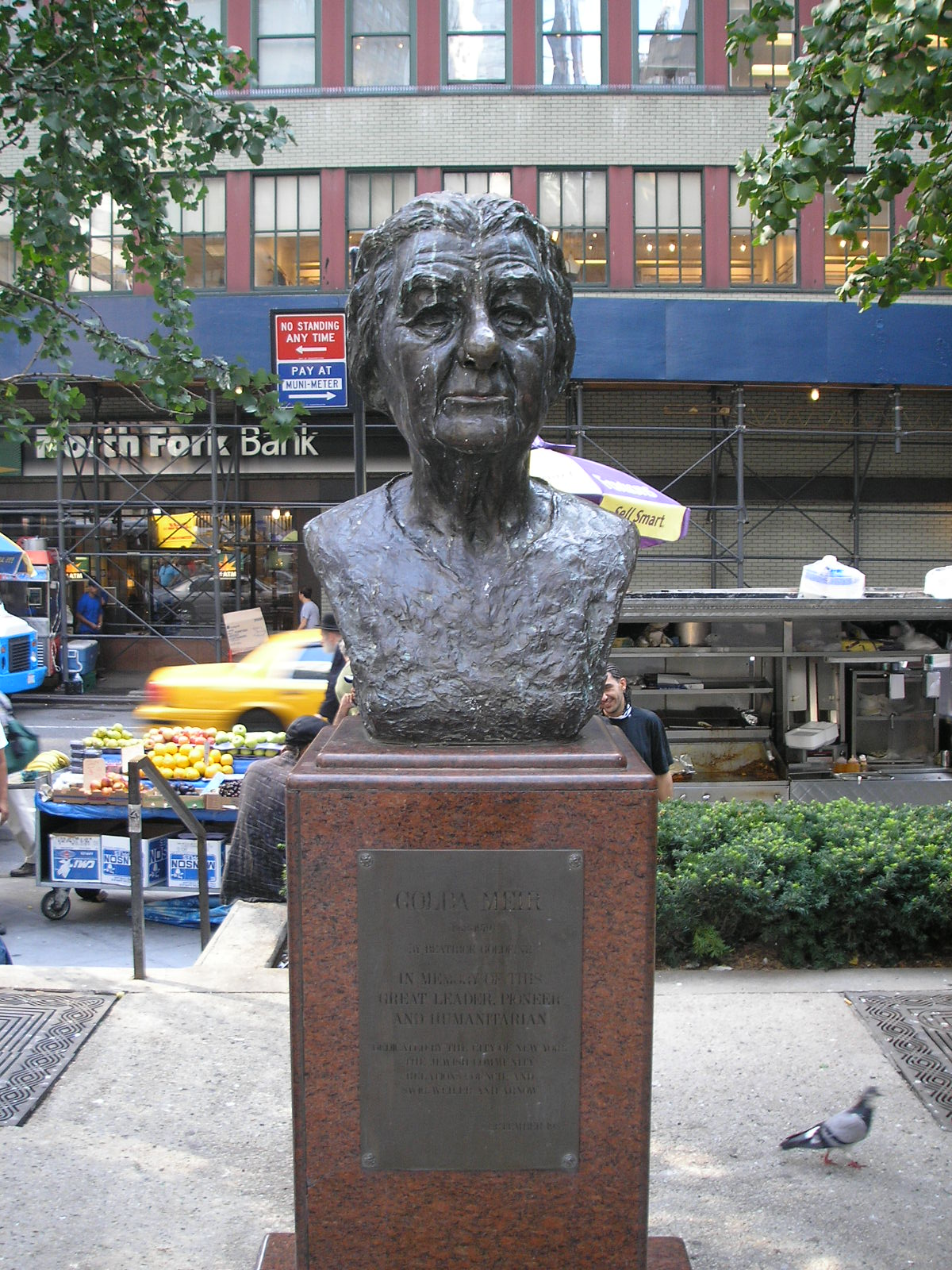
- The sculpture in 2007
- Artist: Beatrice Goldfine
- Type: Sculpture
- Medium: Bronze
- Subject: Golda Meir
- Location: New York City, New York, United States; 40°45′13.9″N 73°59′14.7″W

Golda Meir is an outdoor bronze sculpture of former Israeli prime minister Golda Meir. The sculpture is located at Golda Meir Square near Broadway and 39th Street in the Garment District of Manhattan, New York. It was unveiled in 1984. It is one of only five statues of women in New York City as of 2016.

There has been discussion of the statue in the wake of attempts to rehabilitate Meir's reputation in the US, amid more recent criticism.
