= Goldie Griffith =

American performer (1893–1976)

Goldie Griffith Cameron
- Born: Goldie Griffith; September 30, 1893; Chicago, Illinois, U.S.
- Died: January 6, 1976 (aged 82); Boulder, Colorado, U.S.
- Resting place: Green Mountain Cemetery, Boulder, Boulder County, Colorado, U.S.

Goldie Griffith Cameron (September 30, 1893 – January 6, 1976) was an American performer.

Born in Illinois, she was the daughter of John Thomas Griffith, a traveling medicine show entertainer, and Alice Crites Griffith, who had also been an entertainer. She became a boxer and wrestler in Blanche Whitney's Athletic Show and later a bronco rider in Buffalo Bill's Wild West Show. Newspapers recounted how she once rode her horse up the steps of Grant's Tomb in New York City during a parade. One cowboy called her "the gol darndest gal whoever sat leather." Others called her a "heller in skirts".

Her 1913 marriage to Hiram Joseph "Harry" Sterling, wearing a cherry red sheepskin wedding dress, took place during the middle of a performance before a crowd of 8,000 people at New York's Madison Square Garden. She was given away by Buffalo Bill Cody. Her fellow performers celebrated by riding in circles around the couple, whooping, yipping, firing guns and throwing rice and old shoes. The couple had one son. A few years later, she discovered Sterling was a bigamist who was wanted for murder in Texas. She pointed a gun at Sterling and fired several shots, all of which missed. She was arrested and was still yelling how much she wanted to kill him as she was taken to the police station.

At one point, she was also a stunt rider in American western films in California. She was also the first female applicant to the San Francisco Police Department. She later married a second time, in 1924, to Tim Cameron. They later divorced. She moved in 1922 to Boulder County, Colorado, where she became a rancher, trained dogs for World War II, and owned three popular restaurants between 1945 and 1959. She was frequently interviewed by local media and was a well-known citizen of the area.
