= Cape marigold =

Cape marigold is a common name for several plants and may refer to:

- Arctotheca calendula
- Castalis tragus
- Dimorphotheca spp.
