= Jim Goldie =

Scottish footballer

Personal information
- Full name: James Goldie
- Date of birth: 29 June 1940 (age 86)
- Place of birth: Denny, Stirlingshire, Scotland
- Height: 6 ft 0 in (1.83 m)
- Position: Inside forward

Youth career
- Gairdoch United

Senior career*
Years	Team	Apps	(Gls)
1958–1959	Falkirk	4	(0)
1959–1960	Dundee United	0	(0)
1960–1961	Bo'ness United		
1961–1962	Kilsyth Rangers		
1962–1963	Luton Town	7	(2)
1963–1964	York City	22	(7)
1964–	Poole Town		
Total		33	(9)
- * Club domestic league appearances and goals

James Goldie (born 29 June 1940) is a Scottish former professional footballer who played as a striker in the Football League for Luton Town and York City.
