= Archie Goldie =

Scottish footballer (1874–1953)

Personal information
- Full name: Archibald Goldie
- Date of birth: 5 January 1874
- Place of birth: Hurlford, Scotland
- Date of death: 7 April 1953 (aged 79)
- Place of death: Bordesley Green, England
- Position: Right back

Senior career*
Years	Team	Apps	(Gls)
1892–1895	Clyde	18	(1)
1895–1900	Liverpool	126	(1)
1900	Bootle		
1900–1901	New Brighton Tower	34	(0)
1901–1904	Small Heath	77	(0)
1904–1905	Crewe Alexandra		
- * Club domestic league appearances and goals

Archibald Goldie (5 January 1874 – 7 April 1953) was a Scottish footballer who played as a right back for Liverpool, New Brighton Tower and Small Heath in the Football League in the 1890s and 1900s.

== Life and playing career ==
Born in Hurlford, Ayrshire, Scotland, Goldie played for Clyde before being signed by Liverpool manager John McKenna in June 1895. Goldie, a full-back, was added to the squad that had been relegated to the Second Division at the end of the 1894–95 season; making his debut on 28 September 1895 he helped the club return to the First Division at the first time of asking. He made 22 appearances from the 28 games in the promotion season, then missed just one match as the Anfield club achieved a fifth place upon their return to the top flight.

Goldie's only goal came on 17 October 1896 during the same season but his goal wasn't enough to prevent Liverpool losing 4–3 to Sunderland at Roker Park. He became a regular in the team and was to be joined by his younger brother Bill who too signed from Clyde (another Goldie brother, Jack, was also a footballer, and so was Archie's son Alex).

Goldie left Liverpool in 1900, moving to New Brighton Tower; he later went on to play for Small Heath (who became Birmingham in 1905 then Birmingham City in 1945).

== Honours ==
Liverpool

- Football League Second Division: 1895–96 season
