= Goldaş =

Turkish jewelry fabricator and retailer

Goldaş A.Ş.
- Type: Anonim Şirket
- Traded as: BİST: GOLDS
- Industry: Jewellery
- Founded: 1993; 33 years ago
- Headquarters: Istanbul, Turkey
- Key people: Hasan Yalınkaya (Chairman); Sedat Yalınkaya (CEO)
- Products: Jewellery, assayed precious metal cards and licensed brand goods
- Website: www.goldas.com

Goldaş or Goldaş Jewellery is a Turkish jewellery fabricator and retail sales company. Goldaş markets its product offerings under multiple brand names, including Goldas, Assortie, SilverD’sign, WeddingD’sign, Danthel, Chip Gold, and Chip Silver.

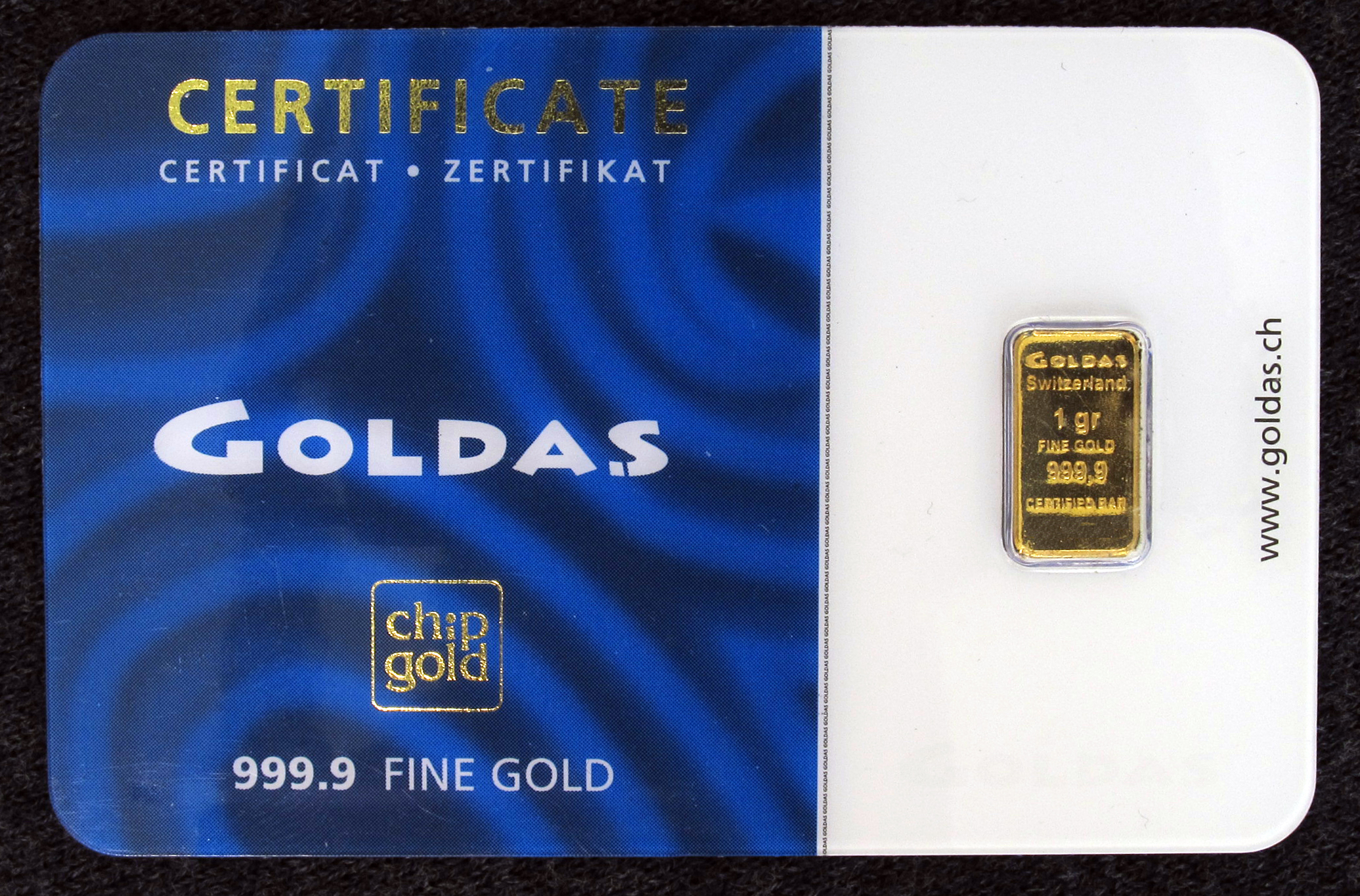
Chip gold bullion bar

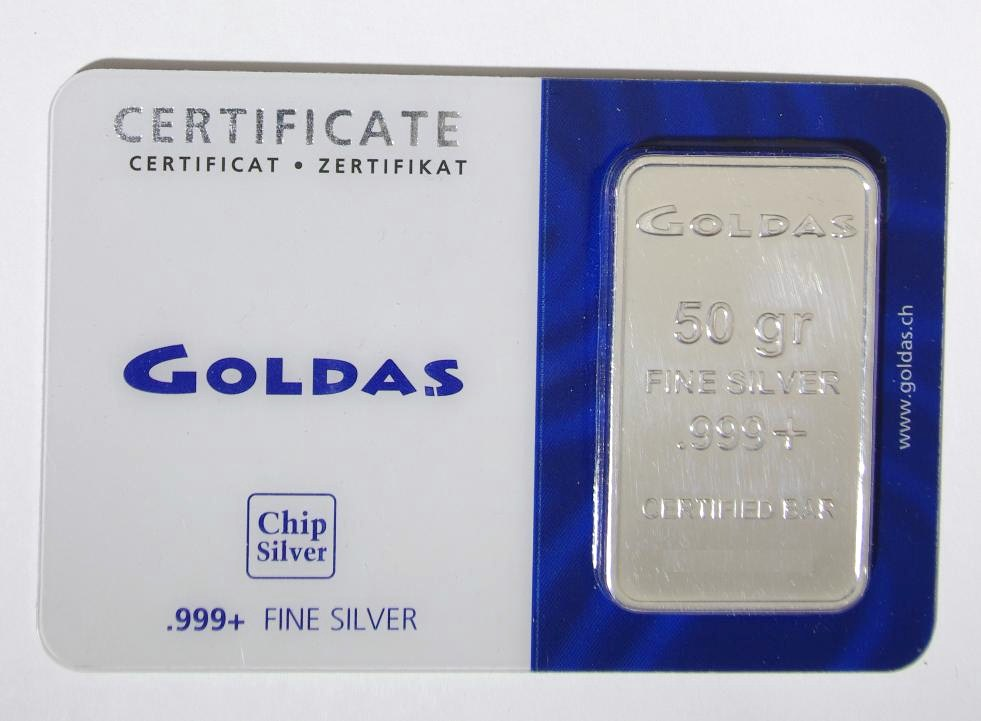
Chip silver bullion bar

== History ==
Goldaş Jewellery was founded in Istanbul, Turkey in 1993 by the Yalınkaya Group. In 1997, Goldaş was reorganized as a subsidiary of a new subsidiary Goldart Holding under a new company Yalınkaya Holding A.Ş. (Note: For the date of company reorganization, see www.yalinkaya.com Corporate Milestones Retrieved 2011-01-05 For structure of new company, see Arslaner, S. (n.d.). Corporate Social Responsibility And Initial Public Offerings [PowerPoint Slides]. 10. www.britishcouncil.org Retrieved 2011-01-05.) From 1998 to 2008, Goldaş saw rapid growth as a company as measured by a 5,609% increase or $955 million in its turnover and was recognized by CNBC-e Business Magazine as first among Turkey's 100 fastest growing companies.

On January 22, 2009, and January 23, 2009, Goldart Holding bought 1.6 million shares of public stock to increase its stake to 55.5% or 80 million shares of Goldaş. After the stock appreciated by 59% in three months time, Goldart Holding sold 11.4 million shares of Goldaş for 14.14 million Turkish liras to three investment funds: Regulus Emerging Market Fund, Neos Emerging Capital Investment, and Porrima Investment.

=== Financial disputes ===
Goldaş has been involved in several major financial disputes since 2008. In March 2008, Société Générale filed suit against Goldaş for not returning a large consignment of gold. In September 2009, Bank of Nova Scotia and Commerzbank filed suits against Goldaş for US$10.9 million and US$11.1 million, respectively. In April 2013, a judgment from the Bakırköy Commercial Court of First Instance in Istanbul had been made in favor of Commerzbank to force the bankruptcy of Goldaş; they announced their plans to appeal the verdict while still engaged with Bank of Nova Scotia in the Istanbul Anatolia Commercial Court of First Instance. Later that year, Turkey's High Court of Appeals effectively reversed the bankruptcy judgment of the lower Turkish court by heeding Goldaş's request for adjudication under British law before subjugation under Turkish bankruptcy law.
