= Goulburn Watsford =

Australian cricketer

Personal information
- Full name: Goulburn Watsford
- Born: 1 July 1859; Goulburn, Colony of New South Wales
- Died: 16 May 1951 (aged 91); Melbourne, Australia
- Role: Batsman/occasional wicket-keeper

Domestic team information
- Years: Team
- 1882/83: South Australia
- 1885/86: Victoria

Career statistics
Competition	First-class
Matches	2
Runs scored	22
Batting average	5.50
100s/50s	–/–
Top score	10
Balls bowled	–
Wickets	–
Bowling average	–
5 wickets in innings	–
10 wickets in match	–
Best bowling	–
Catches/stumpings	–/–
- Source: Cricinfo, 24 July 2015

Goulburn Watsford (1 July 1859 – 16 May 1951) was an Australian cricketer. He played one first-class cricket match for South Australia in 1882/83 and one match for Victoria in 1886.

== See also ==
- List of South Australian representative cricketers
- List of Victoria first-class cricketers
