= Gulda =

Gulda may refer to:

- Friedrich Gulda (1930–2000), Austrian pianist and composer
- Rico Gulda (born 1968), Austrian pianist and conductor, son of Friedrich Gulda

== See also ==
- Golda (disambiguation)
