= Amanda Bartlett Harris =

American author and literary critic

- Born: August 15, 1824; Warner, New Hampshire, U.S.
- Died: January 13, 1917 (aged 82); Warner, New Hampshire, U.S.

Amanda Bartlett Harris (August 15, 1824 – January 13, 1917) was an American author and literary critic best known for her work in children's, educational, and nature literature.

== Early life and family ==
Amanda Bartlett Harris was born in Warner, New Hampshire, as the second child of attorney Harrison Gray Harris and Mary (Bartlett) Harris. She had an elder brother, John A. Harris, born in 1823; a younger sister, Mary B. Harris, born in 1838; and a younger brother, Henry L. Harris, born in 1840. Only the younger brother, Henry, ever married. She had other siblings, but their names have not been identified. Her father, Harrison, studied law with his brother, Judge John Harris, of Hopkinton, New Hampshire, and was admitted to the bar in 1815. In Warner, he held some public offices and over the years transitioned his pursuits to agriculture. Both Harrison and his eldest son, John A., were influential members in the Masonic Order.

== Career ==
Harris began writing at a young age. However, she put her aspirations on pause when her mother died in 1843 and she was left with the responsibilities of raising her four younger siblings and keeping the house for her father. She still wrote but did not do so for publication or under her own name until her father's death in 1875. However, under the pen names Venetia and Ada Grey in 1844 and 1848, respectively, she achieved some success, publishing in a New Hampshire newspaper under the former and in a publication under the latter. Her work was entitled "The Elder Sister" and is a story about a young girl whose mother died, presumably an idealized story of her situation raising her younger siblings. She also used the pseudonym "Kirkland" when writing in the Christian Union.

Family records indicate that the first work she published in her own name was entitled "The Gypsy Queen" in the American Union in 1849, but this particular article has yet to be recovered. However, from 1876 to 1893, she published prolifically, totaling over 150 works and 10 books, mostly for the Lothrop Company in Boston. Her stories were mainly published in Wide Awake, edited by Ella and Charles Pratt, who later became Warner residents themselves. This publication later became known as St. Nicholas Magazine, in which Harris continued to publish works. Her 1880 book How We Went Birds' Nesting included drawings by G.F. Barnes and was "elegantly printed." Her book of biographical sketches, Pleasant Authors for Young Folks (1883), was written about in the Detroit Free Press, who said, "It is written in a pleasant, instructive vein, for young readers." Old School Days (1886) was a "Book of the Week" in The Nation in June 1886. Harris also worked as a book reviewer for The Literary World starting in 1874.

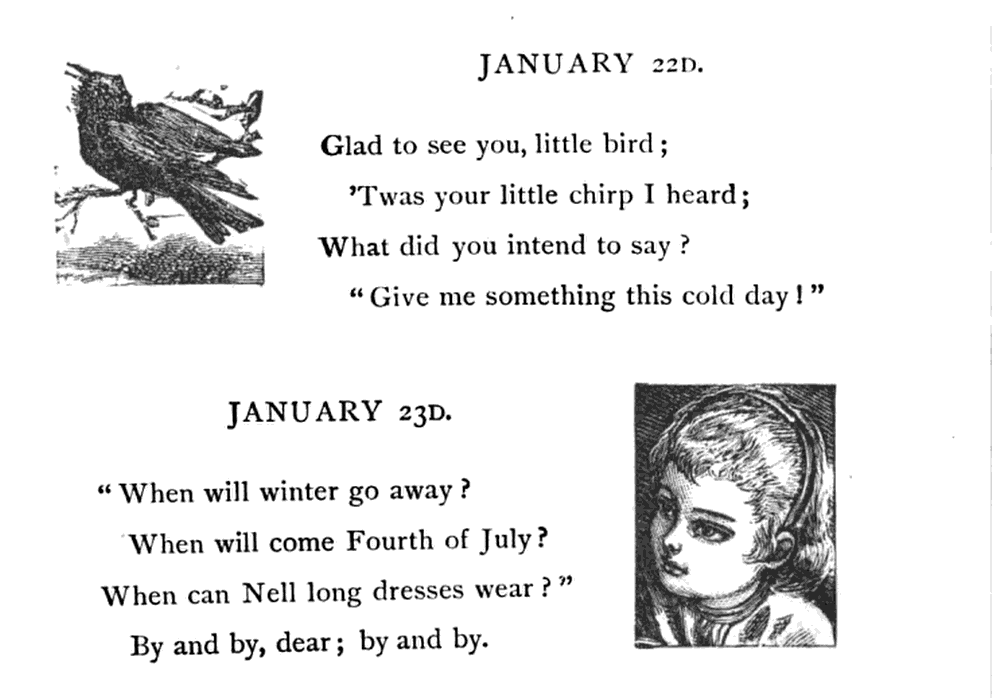
Excerpt from Little Folks' Every Day Book, Rhymes and Illustrations for Every Day (published 1881)

During her career, Harris published dozens of works in a range of publications.

== Personal life ==
Harris spent her entire life in Warner, New Hampshire, and would eventually die there at the age of 92, in 1917. Her funeral took place at her home, drawing "a large attendance from Concord and surrounding towns and with many remembrances of flowers from her former associates in literary work." She was buried in Warner, New Hampshire.

== Selected publications ==
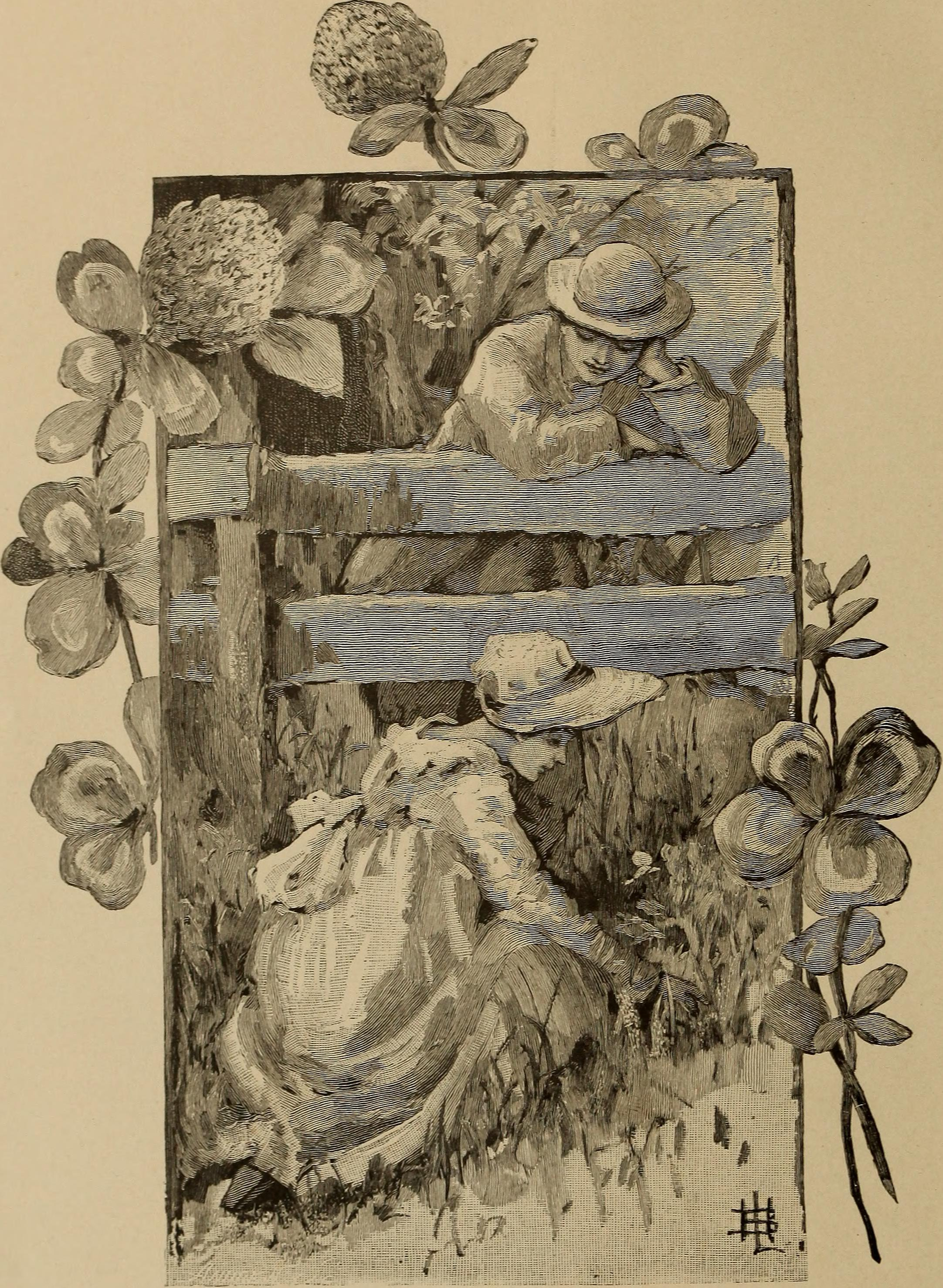
Illustration on the inside of the cover of Wildflowers and Where They Grow (published 1882)

=== Major works ===
- How We Went Birds' Nesting: Field, Wood and Meadow Rambles. illustrated by George Foster Barnes. Boston: D. Lothrop & Company. 1880. OCLC 894197080.
- Little Folks' Every Day Book, Rhymes and Illustrations for Every Day. Boston: D. Lothrop & Company. 1881. OCLC 13465698.
- Wildflowers and Where They Grow. illustrated by Lizbeth Bullock Humphrey. Boston: D. Lothrop & Company. 1882. OCLC 8562245.
- Dooryard Folks; and, A Winter Garden. Boston: D. Lothrop & Company. 1883. OCLC 1379571.
- Pleasant Authors for Young Folks. Boston: D. Lothrop & Company. 1884. OCLC 64432115.

More of her works can be found online. Many of her short stories were published in the aforementioned St. Nicholas Magazine, which can be found online in the Baldwin Library of Historical Children's Literature.
