= William Goldie =

Scottish footballer (1878–1952)

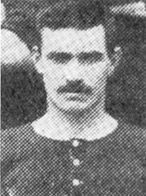

Personal information
- Full name: William Glover Goldie
- Date of birth: 22 January 1878
- Place of birth: Hurlford, Scotland
- Date of death: 3 February 1952 (aged 74)
- Place of death: Hurlford, Scotland
- Height: 5 ft 7 in (1.70 m)
- Position: Left half

Senior career*
Years	Team	Apps	(Gls)
1895–1897	Hurlford Thistle		
1897	Clyde		
1897–1903	Liverpool	158	(6)
1904–1908	Fulham	156	(5)
1908–1911	Leicester Fosse	82	(2)
- * Club domestic league appearances and goals

William Glover Goldie (22 January 1878 – 3 February 1952) was a footballer who played for Liverpool in the late 19th and early 20th centuries, helping them to a Football League Championship.

== Life and playing career ==
Born in Hurlford, Ayrshire, Scotland, Goldie played for Hurlford Thistle and Clyde before being signed by Liverpool manager John McKenna on 25 November 1897.

He made his debut in a Football League Division One match on 2 April 1898 joining his brother, Archie, in the team. The siblings went on to appear together 44 more times before Archie moved to New Brighton Tower in 1900. Bill carried on as a regular in the Reds' first team, not missing a match in the next three years. During this spell Goldie helped the Anfield club to their first English league title in 1901. Goldie scored a total of six goals in his time at Liverpool, his first coming on 3 September 1898.

He left Anfield in January 1904 (although he played his last match in April 1903, thereafter serving a ban for accepting illegal enhanced payments from prospective employers Portsmouth along with John Glover and Sam Raybould), going on to play for Fulham for four years (where he briefly played alongside another brother, Jack) and Leicester Fosse for three.

== Honours ==
Liverpool

- Football League: 1900–01

Fulham

- Southern League: 1905–06, 1906–07
