= Golde =

Golde is a surname. Notable people with the surname include:

- Adam Golde (died 1395/6), English politician
- Franne Golde, American singer and songwriter
- Roger Golde (died 1429), English politician
- Silva Golde (1955–2013), Latvian politician and educator

== Other uses ==
- Golde, the wife of Tevye, protagonist of Fiddler on the Roof

== See also ==
- Gold (disambiguation)
