= Charles Goldie (cricketer) =

English clergyman and cricketer

Charles Dashwood Goldie (26 March 1825 – 11 January 1886) was an English clergyman who played first-class cricket for Cambridge University fleetingly in 1846.

Goldie was born in Paris, France and baptised on 25 April 1825 in St Marylebone Parish Church, London. He was admitted to St John's College, Cambridge in 1843.

Goldie graduated from Cambridge University in 1847 with a Bachelor of Arts degree and was ordained as a priest in the Church of England. He was priest in charge at High Toynton, Lincolnshire in 1851 and then from 1852 to 1866 he had the same position at St Thomas's Church, Colnbrook, Buckinghamshire. He was vicar of St Ives (then in Huntingdonshire) from 1866 until his death there in 1886. Goldie's tenure at St Ives was controversial and his "ritualistic proceedings" alienated many of the congregation; he also attempted to impose church rates and was consistently and successfully opposed on that and on his candidates for the post of churchwarden in "stormy" parish meetings that attracted hundreds of people.

Goldie's first-class cricket career was accidental. In the 1846 University Match between Cambridge University and Oxford University, held at Oxford, the Cambridge batsman John Walker did not appear for the match; the Cambridge team batted one man short in the first innings, but Goldie was co-opted to bat at No 11 in the second innings, and scored one run.

Goldie married Harriet Nicol, the daughter of a Bengal Army colonel, in 1848; among their children was John Goldie, who won fame in rowing at Cambridge and at Henley and after whom the Goldie second string Cambridge University rowing team is named.
