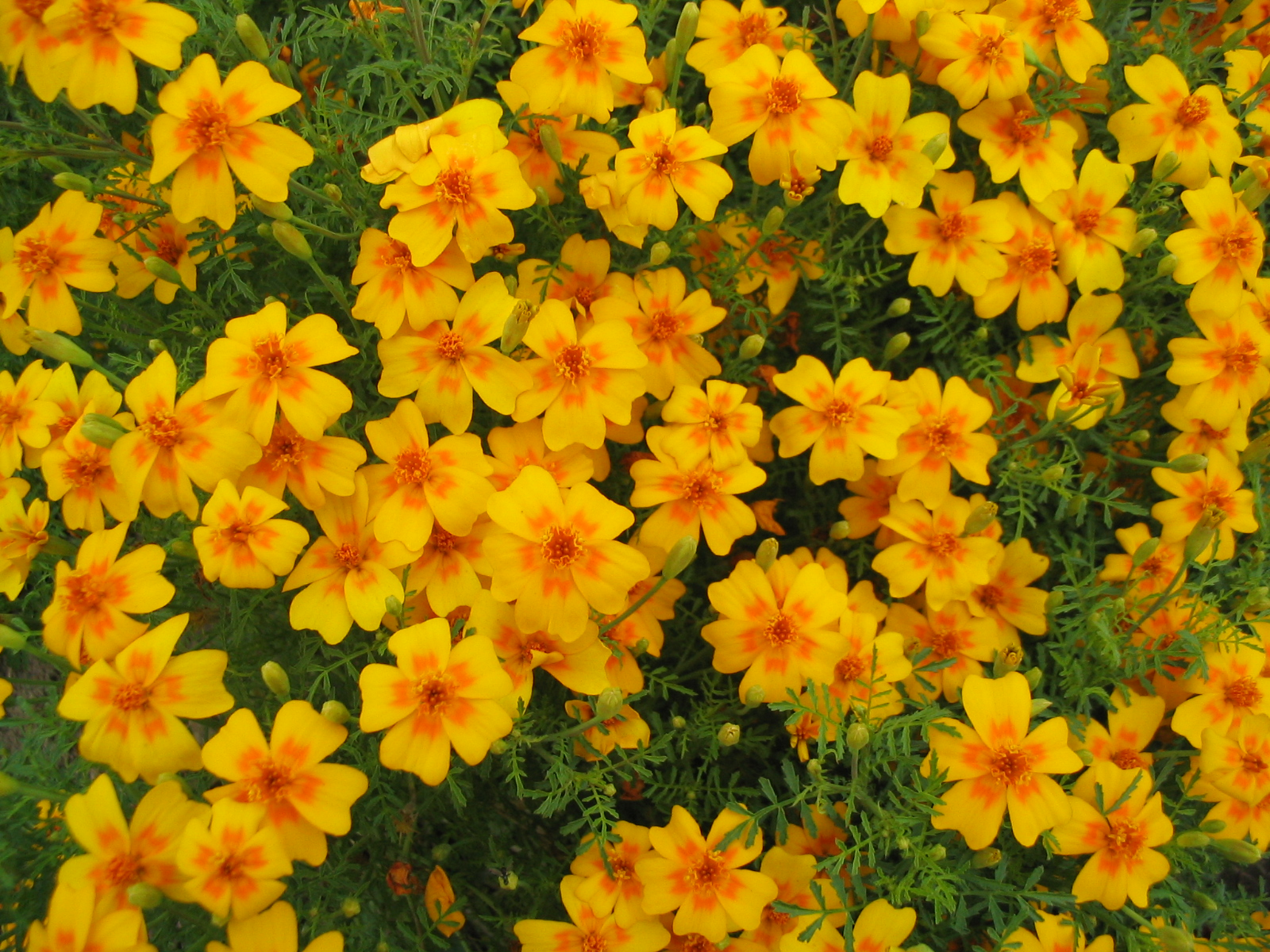

Scientific classification
- Kingdom: Plantae
- Clade: Tracheophytes
- Clade: Angiosperms
- Clade: Eudicots
- Clade: Asterids
- Order: Asterales
- Family: Asteraceae
- Genus: Tagetes
- Species: T. tenuifolia

Binomial name
- Tagetes tenuifolia Cav. 1793 not Kunth 1818 nor Millsp.

Synonyms
- Tagetes jaliscensis var. minor Greenm.; Tagetes macroglossa Pol.; Tagetes oligocephala DC.; Tagetes peduncularis Cav.

= Tagetes tenuifolia =

Species of flowering plant

Tagetes tenuifolia, the signet marigold, golden marigold or lemon marigold, is a North American species of the wild marigold in the family Asteraceae.

== Description ==
Tagetes tenuifolia is an annual herb sometimes reaching as much as 50 cm (20 in) tall. Leaves are less than 3 cm (1 1/4 in) long, deeply divided into many small parts. The plant produces many small bright yellow flower heads in a flat-topped array, each head with five ray florets and 7–9 disc florets.

== Distribution and habitat ==
The species is widespread across most of Mexico as well as Central America, Colombia, and Peru.

== Uses ==
=== Culinary ===
The plant's edible flowers can be used as a garnish because of its lemon-like flavor.

=== Gardening ===
Marigolds are regarded as one of the easiest plants to grow. They are very hardy, and may survive minor frosts. The plant is well suited to a mostly sunny position, and fairly well draining soil. Overly fertile soil may cause the plants to become bushy and produce less flowers. Marigolds come in a variety of colours, but mostly yellows and oranges, flowering in the middle of summer. They can be planted outside when there is risk of frost. They can be purchased from most nurseries, and seeds are readily available in stores. It is often used as a companion plant for its insect-repelling properties.

=== Traditional medicine ===
Traditionally, the plants were decocted and used as a treatment for snakebites in Mexico, and the leaves were used as medicine for bruises in Peru. Tagetes tenuifolia could also be used as treatments for stomach flu in terms of indigestion, constipation, and infant diarrhea.

=== Other ===
Some species of Tagetes possess a characteristic scent, which repels insects such as mosquitoes, small animals and smaller, burrowing insects. Tagetes tenuifolia is one of these and is often planted near small creeks or puddle prone areas to repel bugs, especially mosquitoes. It was also found that the Tagetes tenuifolia contains thiophene which is a biocidal compound that acts as a natural pesticide to control nematodes in the field.
