= Alexander Goldie =

Scottish footballer (1896–1918)

Personal information
- Date of birth: 15 November 1896
- Place of birth: Hurlford, Scotland
- Date of death: 6 November 1918 (aged 21)

Senior career*
Years	Team	Apps	(Gls)
- Saltcoat Vics
- Hurlford
1917–1918	Kilmarnock	34	(16)
- * Club domestic league appearances and goals

Alexander Goldie (15 November 1896 – 6 November 1918) was a Scottish professional footballer who played in the Scottish Football League for Kilmarnock.

== Personal life ==
Goldie was recorded as living at Mauchline Road, Riccarton, Ayrshire with his parents and two brothers in the 1901 census. He died of Spanish flu on 6 November 1918 aged 21.

== Career statistics ==
Appearances and goals by club, season and competition
Club	Season	Division	League		Scottish Cup		Total	
Club	Season	Division	Apps	Goals	Apps	Goals	Apps	Goals
Kilmarnock	1917–18	Scottish Division One	11	7	0	0	11	7
Kilmarnock	1918–19	Scottish Division One	23	9	0	0	23	9
Club career total			34	16	0	0	34	16
