= Marigold Santos =

Filipinx-Canadian artist

- Born: Manila, Philippines
- Education: University of Calgary, Concordia University
- marigoldsantos.com

Marigold Santos is a Filipino-Canadian interdisciplinary artist based in Calgary and Montreal. Her practice includes the following mediums; drawing, painting, printmaking, sculpture, tattooing and sound.

== Early life and education ==
Santos was born in the Manila, Philippines. She immigrated to Canada with her family in 1988; living in Scarborough before moving to Calgary. She has Bachelor of Fine Arts in Printmaking from the University of Calgary. In 2008 she moved to Montreal to study at Concordia University graduating with a Master of Fine Arts in 2011.

== Career ==
Santos is known for work that examines the lived experience of immigration through themes of identity and culture. Her early childhood experience of immigrating provided a starting point for her work which investigates the interrelated notions of "home" and the multiplicities of identity in constant evolution, ultimately exploring the potentialities of transformation. She combines childhood memories of the Philippines and the Canadian Prairies in the late 1980s. Western pop-culture and Filipino folktales along with the geographical differences of the land form the basis of her work, placing emphasis on the relationship between identity and the physical landscape. In addition to her mixed media work, Santos is a tattoo artist who interprets her heritage through drawings of folklore from the Philippines. In 2021 she was profiled as part of RBC's Emerging Artists program.

== Select exhibitions ==
- Black Mirror - Hamilton Artists Inc., Hamilton, Ontario (2015)
- Unsettling Imaginaires, A Space Gallery, Toronto, Ontario (2017) Group Exhibition with Kuh Del Rosaio, Julius Poncele Manapul and Leslie Supnet. Curated by Marissa Largo
- Relations: Diaspora and Painting, Fondation PHI, Montréal, Quebec (2020), group exhibition
- shroud tinikling - Southern Alberta Art Gallery, Lethbridge, Alberta (2023)
- UNEARTHLY, UPRISING - Klondike Institute of Art & Culture - Dawson City, Yukon (2013)
- Coven Ring - The Khyber, Halifax, Nova Scotia (2012)
- Efflorescence / The Way We Wake - Fondation PHI, Montréal, Quebec (2024) Duo exhibition with artist Rajni Perera
