= John Goldie (barrister) =

English barrister and rower

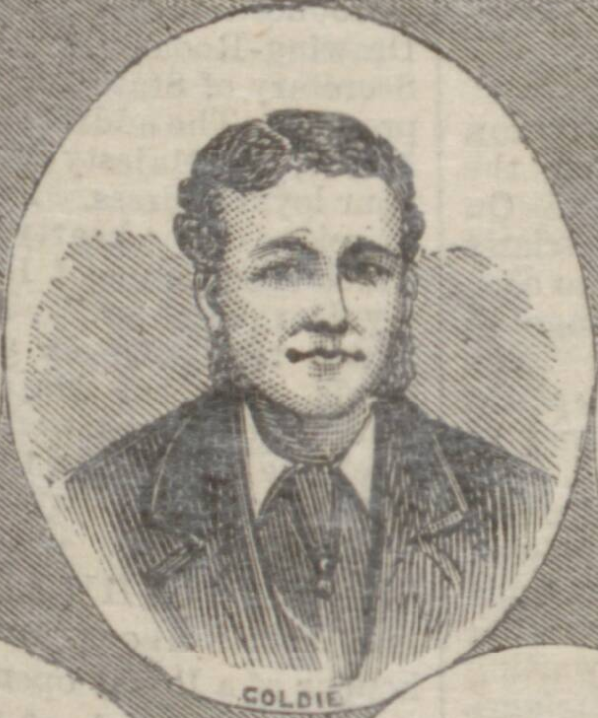
- Born: John Haviland Dashwood Goldie; 18 March 1849; Horncastle, Lincolnshire
- Died: 12 April 1896 (aged 47); St Leonards-on-Sea
- Citizenship: British
- Education: Eton College; St John's College, Cambridge
- Occupation: Barrister
- Known for: President of Cambridge University Boat Club; Captain of Leander Club
- Spouse(s): Grace Miriam Watson (m. 1874–1883) (her death); Ethel Maude Gregson (1886-1896, his death)
- Father: Rev. Charles Dashwood Goldie

John Haviland Dashwood Goldie (18 March 1849 – 12 April 1896) was an English rower, and barrister. He was the Cambridge University Boat Club President between 1870 and 1872, won the Colquhoun Sculls in 1870 and captained Leander Club between 1873 and 1876. He was known by his middle name of "Dashwood" by his family and close friends.

Goldie was the son of Rev. Charles Dashwood Goldie, vicar of St Ives, Cambridgeshire for twenty years. He was educated at Eton and St John's College, Cambridge. Goldie was treasurer of the Pitt Club at Cambridge. He became a barrister.

Goldie captained St Ives Rowing Club in 1869 and won the Colquhoun Sculls in 1870. He stroked the Cambridge crew in the Boat Race in the 1869, 1870, 1871 and 1872 races. Cambridge's victory in 1870 ended Oxford's nine consecutive years of victories and Cambridge won again in 1871 and 1872. He captained Leander from 1873 to 1876 and stroked Leander when they won the Grand Challenge Cup in 1875. He went on to serve as the Leander treasurer from 1882 to 1895. He also umpired at Henley Royal Regatta.

Goldie died at St Leonards-on-Sea aged only 47. He was buried in Richmond Old Burial Ground. The second Cambridge boat is named "Goldie" after him and his name was given to the Goldie Boathouse, used by the university crews.

Goldie married Grace Miriam Watson in 1874. They lived at Richmond and had a daughter and son Claude Goldie who was also a rower. Grace died in 1883 and he married again in 1886 to Ethel Maude Gregson.

== Works ==
- G. G. T. Treherne and J. H. D. Goldie Record of the University Boat Race 1829-1880 and of the Commemoration Dinner 1881 London: Wm Spottiswoode, 1883

== See also ==
- List of Cambridge University Boat Race crews
