= Goldie Thomas =

Australian cricketer

Personal information
- Full name: Mesac William Goulburn Thomas
- Born: 30 April 1885; Australia
- Died: 30 December 1972 (aged 87); Australia
- Source: Cricket Archive, 3 February 2017

Mesac William Goulburn "Goldie" Thomas (30 April 1885 – 30 December 1972) was an Australian cricketer. He played two first-class matches for New South Wales in 1909/10.

== See also ==
- List of New South Wales representative cricketers
