= Goldie Semple =

Canadian actress (1952–2009)

- Born: Marigold Ann Semple; 11 December 1952; Richmond, British Columbia, Canada
- Died: 9 December 2009 (aged 56); Niagara-on-the-Lake, Ontario, Canada
- Occupation: Actress
- Years active: 1986–2009
- Spouse: Lorne Kennedy

Goldie Semple (11 December 1952 – 9 December 2009) was a Canadian actress.

Semple was born Marigold Ann Semple in Richmond, British Columbia. She studied at the University of British Columbia where she graduated with a Bachelor of Fine Arts degree. She continued drama studies at the Bristol Old Vic Theatre School.

Semple's stage work included performances with the Alberta Theatre Projects, Canadian Stage Company, Manitoba Theatre Centre, Shaw Festival, Stratford Shakespeare Festival, Tarragon Theatre and Vancouver Playhouse Theatre Company. She occasionally appeared on television series such as Queer as Folk and Street Legal. Among Semple's performances at the Shaw Festival were the title roles in Camille and Candida in, respectively, 1981–82 and 1983; The Magic Fire in 2006, The Cassilis Engagement in 2007 and Desirée in A Little Night Music in 2008. At the Stratford Festival, her notable performances included Kate in The Taming of the Shrew in 1988, Beatrice in Much Ado About Nothing in 1991, and Cleopatra in Antony and Cleopatra.

During her last eight years, Semple was treated for breast cancer. Her final performances were for the Shaw Festival's production of Noël Coward's Brief Encounters in the 2009 season. The comedy consists of a trio of one-act plays with Semple playing Dolly, Clara and Clare Wedderburn. Her performance was widely praised by critics. After this and a family vacation in Venice, her health deteriorated due to the metastasis of her cancer. Semple died at her residence in Niagara-on-the-Lake, Ontario, aged 56, on 9 December 2009.
