= 1896–97 Liverpool F.C. season =

English football club season

Liverpool
1896–97 season
- Manager: Tom Watson
- First Division: 5th
- FA Cup: Semi-finals
- Top goalscorer: League: George Allan (15); All: George Allan (17)
- Average home league attendance: 12,400 (League)
Home colours	Away colours

The 1896–97 season was the fifth season in Liverpool F.C.'s existence, and was their fourth year in The Football League, in which they competed in the first division. The season covers the period from 1 July 1896 to 30 June 1897.

Liverpool played their first ever game in red shirts and white shorts in a 2–1 away win against The Wednesday on 1 September 1896, this was also new manager Tom Watson's first game in charge.

Liverpool won the Bass Charity Vase after a 1–0 win against Burton Wanderers on 21 April.

== Squad statistics ==
=== Appearances and goals ===
No.	Pos	Nat	Player	Total		Division 1		F.A. Cup	
No.	Pos	Nat	Player	Apps	Goals	Apps	Goals	Apps	Goals
	FW	(Scotland) SCO	George Allan	34	19	29	17	5	2
	FW	(England) ENG	Frank Becton	25	6	20	5	5	1
	MF	(England) ENG	Harry Bradshaw	28	5	25	5	3	0
	DF	(Scotland) SCO	Tom Cleghorn	22	1	17	0	5	1
	GK	(Northern Ireland) NIR	Willie Donnelly	8	0	6	0	2	0
	DF	(Scotland) SCO	Billy Dunlop	7	0	5	0	2	0
	FW	(England) ENG	Fred Geary	11	2	8	2	3	0
	DF	(Scotland) SCO	Archie Goldie	34	1	29	1	5	0
	FW	(Scotland) SCO	David Hannah	4	4	3	3	1	1
	DF	(England) ENG	Johnny Holmes	13	0	13	0	0	0
	GK	(England) ENG	Charlie Jowett	1	0	1	0	0	0
	DF	(Scotland) SCO	John McCartney	35	0	30	0	5	0
	FW	(Scotland) SCO	Andy McCowie	2	0	2	0	0	0
	DF	(Scotland) SCO	Joe McQue	9	0	8	0	1	0
	GK	(Scotland) SCO	Matt McQueen	1	0	1	0	0	0
	MF	(Scotland) SCO	Malcolm McVean	25	4	23	3	2	1
	FW	(Scotland) SCO	Willie Michael	23	4	19	4	4	0
	DF	(Scotland) SCO	Bobby Neill	26	3	22	2	4	1
	FW	(Scotland) SCO	Jimmy Ross	23	3	21	2	2	1
	GK	(England) ENG	Harry Storer	26	0	23	0	3	0
	DF	(Scotland) SCO	Tom Wilkie	28	0	25	0	3	0

== Table ==
Pos	Team	Pld	W	D	L	GF	GA	GAv	Pts
3	Derby County	30	16	4	10	70	50	1.400	36
4	Preston North End	30	11	12	7	55	40	1.375	34
5	Liverpool	30	12	9	9	46	38	1.211	33
6	The Wednesday	30	10	11	9	42	37	1.135	31
7	Everton	30	14	3	13	62	57	1.088	31

Source: World Football
Rules for classification: 1) Points; 2) Goal average; 3) Goals scored

== Competitions ==
=== League Division 1 ===
1 September 1896 1	The Wednesday	1–2	Liverpool	Sheffield
	Davis 18'	Report	Allan 13', 44'	Stadium: Olive Grove; Attendance: 2,000

5 September 1896 2	Blackburn Rovers	1–0	Liverpool	Blackburn
	Stuart 80'	Report		Stadium: Ewood Park; Attendance: 6,000

7 September 1896 3	Liverpool	0–2	Bolton Wanderers	Liverpool
		Report	Nicoll 47'; Jack 75'	Stadium: Anfield; Attendance: 15,000

12 September 1896 4	Liverpool	2–0	Derby County	Liverpool
	Methven 25' (o.g.); Bradshaw 44'	Report		Stadium: Anfield; Attendance: 10,000

19 September 1896 5	Bury	1–2	Liverpool	Bury
	Barbour 89'	Report	McVean 35'; Allan 65'	Stadium: Gigg Lane; Attendance: 4,000

26 September 1896 6	Liverpool	0–0	West Bromwich Albion	Liverpool
		Report		Stadium: Anfield; Attendance: 15,000

3 October 1896 7	Everton	2–1	Liverpool	Liverpool
	Milward 11'; Hartley 13'	Report	Ross 51'	Stadium: Goodison Park; Attendance: 40,000

10 October 1896 8	Liverpool	3–0	Nottingham Forest	Liverpool
	Michael 38'; McVean 81'; Bradshaw 88'	Report		Stadium: Anfield; Attendance: 8,000

17 October 1896 9	Sunderland	4–3	Liverpool	Sunderland
	Hannah 2', 44'; Hamilton 15', 76'	Report	Goldie 72'; Gow 85' (o.g.); Allan 88'	Stadium: Newcastle Road; Attendance: 7,000

19 October 1896 10	Sheffield United	1–1	Liverpool	Sheffield
	Henderson 14'	Report	Bradshaw 75'	Stadium: Bramall Lane; Attendance: 6,500

24 October 1896 11	Liverpool	4–0	Blackburn Rovers	Liverpool
	Allan 25', 68'; Ross 35'; Michael 75'	Report		Stadium: Anfield; Attendance: 10,000

31 October 1896 12	West Bromwich Albion	0–1	Liverpool	West Bromwich
		Report	Allan 1'	Stadium: Stoney Lane; Attendance: 5,000

7 November 1896 13	Liverpool	3–0	Sunderland	Liverpool
	Hannah 36', 48', 55'	Report		Stadium: Anfield; Attendance: 10,000

14 November 1896 14	Preston North End	1–1	Liverpool	Preston
	Brown 25'	Report	Michael 53'	Stadium: Deepdale; Attendance: 8,000

21 November 1896 15	Liverpool	0–0	Everton	Liverpool
		Report		Stadium: Anfield; Attendance: 30,000

28 November 1896 16	Nottingham Forest	2–0	Liverpool	Nottingham
	Forman 7'; Spencer 35'	Report		Stadium: Town Ground; Attendance: 5,000

12 December 1896 17	Liverpool	3–1	Bury	Liverpool
	McVean 20'; Allan 30', 75'	Report	Plant 47'	Stadium: Anfield; Attendance: 7,000

19 December 1896 18	Derby County	3–2	Liverpool	Derby
	Miller 30'; Bloomer 35'; Stevenson 85'	Report	Bradshaw 25'; Neill 60'	Stadium: Baseball Ground; Attendance: 10,000

25 December 1896 19	Liverpool	3–3	Aston Villa	Liverpool
	Becton 8', 58' (pen.); Allan 30'	Report	Cowan 33'; Wheldon 40'; Athersmith 83'	Stadium: Anfield; Attendance: 15,000

26 December 1896 20	Burnley	4–1	Liverpool	Burnley
	Toman 1'; Bowes 35', 45'; Chambers 72'	Report	Becton 12'	Stadium: Turf Moor; Attendance: 7,000

1 January 1897 21	Bolton Wanderers	1–4	Liverpool	Bolton
	Jack 90'	Report	Allan 37', 40' (?); Geary	Stadium: Burnden Park; Attendance: 20,000

2 January 1897 22	Liverpool	0–0	Sheffield United	Liverpool
		Report		Stadium: Anfield; Attendance: 10,000

9 January 1897 23	Wolverhampton Wanderers	1–2	Liverpool	Wolverhampton
	McMain 5'	Report	Allan 15'; Geary 70'	Stadium: Molineux Stadium; Attendance: 3,000

16 January 1897 24	Liverpool	1–0	Stoke City	Liverpool
	Allan 30'	Report		Stadium: Anfield; Attendance: 10,000

6 February 1897 25	Stoke	6–1	Liverpool	Stoke-on-Trent
	Hingerty; Schofield 25', 58'; Maxwell 43'; Hill 65', 65'	Report	Allan 40'	Stadium: Victoria Ground; Attendance: 8,000

4 March 1897 26	Liverpool	3–0	Wolverhampton Wanderers	Liverpool
	Becton 25'; Bradshaw 30'; Allan 52'	Report		Stadium: Anfield; Attendance: 4,000

13 March 1897 27	Aston Villa	0–0	Liverpool	Birmingham
		Report		Stadium: Wellington Road (Perry Barr); Attendance: 18,000

27 March 1897 28	Liverpool	1–2	Burnley	Liverpool
	Neill 35'	Report	Toman 27'; Brown 30'	Stadium: Anfield; Attendance: 7,000

3 April 1897 29	Liverpool	2–2	The Wednesday	Liverpool
	Michael 70'; Becton 82'	Report	Brady 25'; Davis 55'	Stadium: Anfield; Attendance: 6,000

10 April 1897 30	Liverpool	0–0	Preston North End	Liverpool
		Report		Stadium: Anfield; Attendance: 12,000

=== F.A. Cup ===
30 January 1897 1	Liverpool	4–3	Burton Swifts	Liverpool
	Hannah 5'; Allan 19'; Cleghorn 70'; Ross 85'	Report	Dewey 15'; Wyllie 25'; Evans 55'	Stadium: Anfield; Attendance: 4,000

13 February 1897 2	West Bromwich Albion	1–2	Liverpool	West Bromwich
	Watson 85'	Report	McVean 5'; Neill 24'	Stadium: Stoney Lane; Attendance: 16,000

27 February 1897 3	Liverpool	1–1	Nottingham Forest	Liverpool
	Becton 37'	Report	McInnes 15'	Stadium: Anfield; Attendance: 15,000

3 March 1897 3	Nottingham Forest	0–1	Liverpool	Nottingham
		Report	Allan	Stadium: Town Ground; Attendance: 10,000

20 March 1897 SF	Aston Villa	3–0	Liverpool	Sheffield
	Cowan 35', 55'; Athersmith 75'	Report		Stadium: Bramall Lane; Attendance: 30,000; Referee: A. Scragg

=== Lancashire Senior Cup ===
5 December 1896 1	Liverpool	9–0	Fleetwood Rangers	Liverpool
	Allan; Becton; McQue ? (o.g.)	Report		Stadium: Anfield; Attendance: 1,000

23 January 1897 2	Liverpool	2–2	Bolton Wanderers	Liverpool
	Geary 20'; Bradshaw 88'	Report	Goal	Stadium: Anfield; Attendance: 12,000

15 February 1897 2	Bolton Wanderers	2–0	Liverpool	Bolton
	Goal	Report		Stadium: Burnden Park; Attendance: 6,000

=== Testimonials ===
12 April 1897	Liverpool	1–1	Burnley	Liverpool
	Holmes	Report	Goal	Stadium: Anfield; Referee: J. McGill
Note: Testimonial for Malcolm McVean

=== Bass Charity Vase ===
7 April 1897 SF	Walsall	0–1	Liverpool	Burton upon Trent
		Report	Neill	Stadium: Peel Croft

21 April 1897 F	Burton Wanderers	0–1	Liverpool	Burton upon Trent
		Report	Allan 75'	Stadium: Peel Croft

=== Friendlies ===
20 February 1897	Birmingham	5–1	Liverpool	Birmingham
	Goal	Report	Becton	Stadium: Muntz Street

6 March 1897	Liverpool	2–1	Heart of Midlothian	Liverpool
	Michael; Becton 10'	Report	Goal	Stadium: Anfield; Attendance: 3,500

13 April 1897	Oldham County	3–1	Liverpool	Oldham
	Goal	Report	Michael 89'	Stadium: Boundary Park; Attendance: 2,000

19 April 1897	Everton	2–1	Liverpool	Liverpool
	Goal	Report	Bradshaw	Stadium: Goodison Park; Attendance: 10,000

20 April 1897	Liverpool	1–0	Cliftonville	Liverpool
	Worrall	Report		Stadium: Anfield; Referee: J.McGill

24 April 1897	Heart of Midlothian	3–0	Liverpool	Edinburgh
	Goal	Report		Stadium: Tynecastle Stadium; Attendance: 5,000

26 April 1897	East Stirlingshire	2–2	Liverpool	Bainsford
	Goal	Report	Geary; Bradshaw	Stadium: Merchiston Park; Attendance: 2,500

28 April 1897	Victoria United	0–1	Liverpool	Aberdeen
		Report	Becton	Stadium: Torry; Attendance: 2,000

29 April 1897	Dundee	4–0	Liverpool	Dundee
	Goal	Report		Stadium: Carolina Port

30 April 1897	Wishaw Thistle	3–4	Liverpool	Wishaw
	Goal	Report	Goal	Stadium: Old Public Park; Attendance: 2,000
