= 1895–96 Liverpool F.C. season =

English football club season

Liverpool
1895–96 season
- Manager: John McKenna
- Second Division: 1st (promoted)
- FA Cup: Second round
- Top goalscorer: George Allan (25)
| Home colours | Away colours |

The 1895–96 season was the 4th season in Liverpool F.C.'s existence, and was their third year in The Football League, in which they competed in the Second Division. The season covers the period from 1 July 1895 to 30 June 1896. Liverpool won the second division title and got promoted to the first division after winning two and drawing one of four test matches, which were played at home and away against Small Heath and West Bromwich Albion.

Liverpool scored 106 league goals in 30 games, a record total for a league season which still stands.

== Squad statistics ==
=== Appearances and goals ===
| No. | Pos | Nat | Player | Total | | Division 2 | | F.A. Cup | | Test Matches | |
| No. | Pos | Nat | Player | Apps | Goals | Apps | Goals | Apps | Goals | Apps | Goals |
|---|---|---|---|---|---|---|---|---|---|---|---|
| | FW | (Scotland) SCO | George Allan | 26 | 29 | 20 | 25 | 2 | 1 | 4 | 3 |
| | DF | (Scotland) SCO | Barney Battles | 5 | 0 | 2 | 0 | 0 | 0 | 3 | 0 |
| | FW | (England) ENG | Frank Becton | 30 | 18 | 24 | 17 | 2 | 1 | 4 | 0 |
| | MF | (England) ENG | Harry Bradshaw | 32 | 15 | 26 | 12 | 2 | 1 | 4 | 2 |
| | MF | (England) ENG | Ben Bull | 1 | 1 | 1 | 1 | 0 | 0 | 0 | 0 |
| | DF | (Scotland) SCO | Tom Cleghorn | 7 | 0 | 3 | 0 | 0 | 0 | 4 | 0 |
| | DF | (Scotland) SCO | John Curran | 6 | 0 | 6 | 0 | 0 | 0 | 0 | 0 |
| | DF | (Scotland) SCO | Billy Dunlop | 12 | 0 | 12 | 0 | 0 | 0 | 0 | 0 |
| | FW | (England) ENG | Fred Geary | 22 | 11 | 19 | 11 | 2 | 0 | 1 | 0 |
| | DF | (Scotland) SCO | Archie Goldie | 28 | 0 | 22 | 0 | 2 | 0 | 4 | 0 |
| | FW | (Scotland) SCO | David Hannah | 11 | 3 | 11 | 3 | 0 | 0 | 0 | 0 |
| | DF | (England) ENG | Johnny Holmes | 19 | 0 | 17 | 0 | 2 | 0 | 0 | 0 |
| | FW | (England) ENG | Bill Keech | 6 | 0 | 6 | 0 | 0 | 0 | 0 | 0 |
| | DF | (Scotland) SCO | John McCartney | 28 | 2 | 22 | 1 | 2 | 0 | 4 | 1 |
| | DF | (Scotland) SCO | John McLean | 8 | 0 | 8 | 0 | 0 | 0 | 0 | 0 |
| | DF | (Scotland) SCO | Joe McQue | 32 | 5 | 26 | 5 | 2 | 0 | 4 | 0 |
| | GK | (Scotland) SCO | Matt McQueen | 22 | 0 | 22 | 0 | 0 | 0 | 0 | 0 |
| | MF | (Scotland) SCO | Malcolm McVean | 27 | 7 | 24 | 7 | 0 | 0 | 3 | 0 |
| | FW | (Scotland) SCO | Jimmy Ross | 31 | 24 | 25 | 23 | 2 | 1 | 4 | 0 |
| | GK | (England) ENG | Harry Storer | 17 | 0 | 11 | 0 | 2 | 0 | 4 | 0 |
| | GK | (England) ENG | John Whitehead | 2 | 0 | 2 | 0 | 0 | 0 | 0 | 0 |
| | DF | (Scotland) SCO | Tom Wilkie | 24 | 1 | 21 | 1 | 2 | 0 | 1 | 0 |

== Table ==
| Pos | Team | Pld | W | D | L | GF | GA | GAv | Pts | Qualification or relegation |
|---|---|---|---|---|---|---|---|---|---|---|
| 1 | Liverpool (C, O, P) | 30 | 22 | 2 | 6 | 106 | 32 | 3.313 | 46 | Qualification for test matches |
| 2 | Manchester City | 30 | 21 | 4 | 5 | 63 | 38 | 1.658 | 46 | Qualification for test matches |
| 3 | Grimsby Town | 30 | 20 | 2 | 8 | 82 | 38 | 2.158 | 42 | |
| 4 | Burton Wanderers | 30 | 19 | 4 | 7 | 69 | 40 | 1.725 | 42 | |
| 5 | Newcastle United | 30 | 16 | 2 | 12 | 73 | 50 | 1.460 | 34 | |

Rules for classification: 1) Points; 2) Goal average; 3) Goals scored
(C) Champions; (O) Play-off winners; (P) Promoted

== Competitions ==
Win Draw Loss

=== League Division 2 ===
| 7 September 1895 1 | Notts County | 2–3 | Liverpool | Nottingham |
| | Allsopp 70'; Calderhead 84' | Report | Ross 7'; McQue 32'; Bradshaw 40' | Stadium: Town Ground; Attendance: 8,000 |

| 14 September 1895 2 | Liverpool | 5–1 | Newcastle United | Liverpool |
| | Ross 1', 15', ?'; Becton 6'; Bradshaw | Report | Logan 47' | Stadium: Anfield; Attendance: 7,000 |

| 21 September 1895 3 | Loughborough | 2–4 | Liverpool | Loughborough |
| | Swift; Middleton | Report | Ross 25'; Allan 40'; Hannah 42', ? ' | Stadium: Athletic Ground; Attendance: 3,500 |

| 28 September 1895 4 | Liverpool | 5–1 | Burslem Port Vale | Liverpool |
| | Allan ?', 5', 80', 88 ' Hannah 50' | Report | Mason 55' | Stadium: Anfield; Attendance: 3,000 |

| 30 September 1895 5 | Liverpool | 4–1 | Burton Wanderers | Liverpool |
| | Bradshaw 5', ?'; Becton ?', ?' | Report | Garfield 85' | Stadium: Anfield; Attendance: 3,000 |

| 5 October 1895 6 | Newcastle United | 1–0 | Liverpool | Newcastle upon Tyne |
| | Wardrope 18' | Report | | Stadium: St James' Park; Attendance: 10,000 |

| 7 October 1895 7 | Liverpool | 6–1 | Crewe Alexandra | Liverpool |
| | Allan 5', ?'; Ross 21', ?'; Geary ?', ? ' | Report | Burgoyne 89' | Stadium: Anfield; Attendance: 3,000 |

| 12 October 1895 8 | Liverpool | 7–1 | Newton Heath | Liverpool |
| | Becton 7', ?'; Bradshaw 22', ?'; Geary 30', 55'; Ross 87' | Report | Cassidy 40' | Stadium: Anfield; Attendance: 10,000 |

| 19 October 1895 9 | Grimsby Town | 1–0 | Liverpool | Grimsby |
| | Gray 15' | Report | | Stadium: Abbey Park; Attendance: 5,000 |

| 21 October 1895 10 | Burslem Port Vale | 5–4 | Liverpool | Stoke-on-Trent |
| | Evans; Beckett; Black; Downie; Mason 46 ' | Report | Becton 15', ?', ?'; Bradshaw | Stadium: Athletic Ground; Attendance: 1,000 |

| 26 October 1895 11 | Liverpool | 3–0 | Notts County | Liverpool |
| | Geary; Bradshaw; Ross | Report | | Stadium: Anfield; Attendance: 6,000 |

| 2 November 1895 12 | Newton Heath | 5–2 | Liverpool | Manchester |
| | Clarkin; Peters; Smith | Report | Becton; Ross | Stadium: Bank Street; Attendance: 9,000 |

| 9 November 1895 13 | Liverpool | 3–1 | Leicester Fosse | Liverpool |
| | Geary; Wilkie | Report | Bishop | Stadium: Anfield; Attendance: 4,500; Referee: L.W. Furniss |

| 16 November 1895 14 | Woolwich Arsenal | 0–2 | Liverpool | London |
| | | Report | Geary; Bradshaw | Stadium: Manor Ground; Attendance: 10,000 |

| 23 November 1895 15 | Liverpool | 0–0 | Darwen | Liverpool |
| | | Report | Haddow (red card) | Stadium: Anfield; Attendance: 4,000 |

| 30 November 1895 16 | Leicester Fosse | 2–0 | Liverpool | Leicester |
| | Davies; McArthur | Report | | Stadium: Filbert Street; Attendance: 8,000 |

| 7 December 1895 17 | Liverpool | 1–0 | Loughborough | Liverpool |
| | Becton 75' | Report | | Stadium: Anfield; Attendance: 1,000 |

| 14 December 1895 18 | Darwen | 0–4 | Liverpool | Darwen |
| | | Report | McVean; McQue; Geary | Stadium: Barley Bank; Attendance: 3,000 |

| 21 December 1895 19 | Lincoln City | 0–1 | Liverpool | Lincoln |
| | | Report | Allan 35' | Stadium: Sincil Bank; Attendance: 3,000 |

| 1 January 1896 20 | Liverpool | 3–1 | Manchester City | Liverpool |
| | Ross 50', 85'; McVean 54' | Report | Rowan 89' | Stadium: Anfield; Attendance: 20,000 |

| 4 January 1896 21 | Rotherham Town | 0–5 | Liverpool | Rotherham |
| | | Report | Allan; Ross; Bradshaw | Stadium: Clifton Grove; Attendance: 2,000 |

| 11 January 1896 22 | Liverpool | 3–0 | Woolwich Arsenal | Liverpool |
| | McQue; Ross | Report | | Stadium: Anfield; Attendance: 5,000 |

| 25 January 1896 23 | Liverpool | 6–1 | Lincoln City | Liverpool |
| | Bull; Ross; Becton; Geary; Allan | Report | Gillespie | Stadium: Anfield; Attendance: 4,000 |

| 18 February 1896 24 | Liverpool | 10–1 | Rotherham Town | Liverpool |
| | McVean; Ross; Becton; Allan | Report | Cutts | Stadium: Anfield; Attendance: 2,000 |

| 22 February 1896 25 | Liverpool | 3–1 | Grimsby Town | Liverpool |
| | Becton; Allan | Report | Gray | Stadium: Anfield; Attendance: 7,000 |

| 29 February 1896 26 | Burton Swifts | 0–7 | Liverpool | Burton upon Trent |
| | | Report | Becton; McCartney; Ross | Stadium: Peel Croft; Attendance: 3,000 |

| 7 March 1896 27 | Burton Wanderers | 2–1 | Liverpool | Burton upon Trent |
| | Devey 14'; Garfield 85' | Report | Allan 19' | Stadium: Derby Turn; Attendance: 2,000 |

| 21 March 1896 28 | Liverpool | 6–1 | Burton Swifts | Liverpool |
| | Allan; Bradshaw; McQue; Ross | Report | Charlie Willatt | Stadium: Anfield; Attendance: 4,000 |

| 28 March 1896 29 | Crewe Alexandra | 0–7 | Liverpool | Crewe |
| | | Report | McVean; Allan; McQue; Becton | Stadium: Nantwich Road; Attendance: 3,000 |

| 3 April 1896 30 | Manchester City | 1–1 | Liverpool | Manchester |
| | Morris 15' | Report | Allan 81' | Stadium: Hyde Road; Attendance: 25,000 |

=== F.A. Cup ===
| 1 February 1896 1 | Liverpool | 4–1 | Millwall Athletic | Liverpool |
| | Ross 20'; Becton 40'; Allan 50'; Bradshaw 70' | Report | Geddes 44' | Stadium: Anfield; Attendance: 10,000 |

| 15 February 1896 2 | Wolverhampton Wanderers | 2–0 | Liverpool | Wolverhampton |
| | Harry Wood 25'; Billy Owen 30' (pen.) | Report | | Stadium: Molineux Stadium; Attendance: 15,000 |

=== Test Matches ===
| 18 April 1896 | Liverpool | 4–0 | Small Heath | Liverpool |
| | Allan; McCartney; Bradshaw | Report | | Stadium: Anfield; Attendance: 20,000 |

| 20 April 1896 | Small Heath | 0–0 | Liverpool | Birmingham |
| | | Report | | Stadium: Coventry Road; Attendance: 5,000 |

| 25 April 1896 | Liverpool | 2–0 | West Bromwich Albion | Liverpool |
| | Bradshaw 30'; Allan 61' | Report | | Stadium: Anfield; Attendance: 20,000 |

| 27 April 1896 | West Bromwich Albion | 2–0 | Liverpool | West Bromwich |
| | Williams 60' (pen.); Richards 65' | Report | | Stadium: Stoney Lane; Attendance: 15,000 |

=== Lancashire Senior Cup ===
| 18 January 1896 1 | Blackburn Rovers | 2–1 | Liverpool | Blackburn |
| | Goal | Report | Allan 55' | Stadium: Ewood Park; Attendance: 7,000 |

=== Testimonials ===
| 23 September 1895 | Liverpool | 0–3 | England International XI | Liverpool |
| | | Report | Harry Hammond | Stadium: Anfield; Attendance: 4,000 |
Note: Testimonial for Matt McQueen.

| 4 November 1895 | Preston North End | 2–1 | Liverpool | Preston |
| | Goal | Report | Ross | Stadium: Deepdale; Attendance: 2,000 |
Note: Testimonial for Bob Holmes.

| 2 December 1895 | Wrexham & District | 0–5 | Liverpool | Wrexham |
| | | Report | Keech; Holmes; Becton | Stadium: Racecourse Ground; Attendance: Unknown; Referee: R.T. Gough |
Note: Testimonial for Arthur Lea (Wrexham's secretary).

| 6 April 1896 | Liverpool | 4–3 | Burnley | Liverpool |
| | Bradshaw; Geary; Clarke | Report | Goal | Stadium: Anfield; Attendance: 5,000; Referee: Roche |
Note: Testimonial for Joe McQue.

=== Friendlies ===
| 3 September 1895 | Liverpool | 2–0 | Celtic | Liverpool |
| | Allan 10'; Becton | Report | Morrison (red card) | Stadium: Anfield; Attendance: 5,000; Referee: J. Lewis |

| 9 September 1895 | The Wednesday | 4–2 | Liverpool | Sheffield |
| | Bell; Davis; Callaghan | Report | Allan 4 ' Bradshaw 88 ' | Stadium: Olive Grove; Attendance: 1,500; Referee: J. Fox |

| 16 September 1895 | Liverpool | 0–2 | Derby County | Liverpool |
| | | Report | Goal | Stadium: Anfield; Attendance: 2,000 |

| 11 November 1895 | Liverpool | 5–1 | Irish International XI | Liverpool |
| | Becton ?', 47'; Bradshaw; Ross; Geary 46' | Report | Goal | Stadium: Anfield; Attendance: Unknown |

| 25 December 1895 | Bolton Wanderers | 0–0 | Liverpool | Bolton |
| | | Report | | Stadium: Burnden Park; Attendance: 4,000 |

| 26 December 1895 | Blackburn Rovers | 0–1 | Liverpool | Blackburn |
| | | Report | Ross 90 ' | Stadium: Ewood Park; Attendance: 3,000 |

| 8 February 1896 | Preston North End | 3–2 | Liverpool | Preston |
| | Goal | Report | Ross; McCartney 30 ' | Stadium: Deepdale; Attendance: 1,000 |

| 14 March 1896 | Liverpool | 5–1 | West Bromwich Albion | Liverpool |
| | Becton; Bradshaw; McVean; Ross | Report | Goal | Stadium: Anfield; Attendance: 4,700 |

| 8 April 1896 | Liverpool | 1–0 | The Wednesday | Liverpool |
| | Clarke | Report | | Stadium: Anfield; Attendance: 1,000 |

| 11 April 1896 | Burnley | 3–3 | Liverpool | Burnley |
| | Goal | Report | Hannah; McVean; Clarke | Stadium: Turf Moor; Attendance: 1,500 |

| 29 April 1896 | Northwich Victoria | 1–1 | Liverpool | Northwich |
| | Goal | Report | Geary | Stadium: Drill Field; Attendance: Unknown |

| 30 April 1896 | Southport Central | 1–0 | Liverpool | Southport |
| | Goal | Report | | Stadium: Ash Street; Attendance: Unknown |
