= 1894–95 Liverpool F.C. season =

English football club season

Liverpool
1894–95 season
- Manager: William Barclay & John McKenna
- First Division: 16th (relegated)
- FA Cup: Second round
- Top goalscorer: Harry Bradshaw (18)
Home colours	Away colours

The 1894–95 season was the third season in Liverpool F.C.'s existence, and was their second year in The Football League, in which they competed in the First Division for the first time. The season covers the period from 1 July 1894 to 30 June 1895.

== Squad statistics ==
=== Appearances and goals ===
No.	Pos	Nat	Player	Total		Division 1		F.A. Cup		Test Match	
No.	Pos	Nat	Player	Apps	Goals	Apps	Goals	Apps	Goals	Apps	Goals
	FW	(England) ENG	Frank Becton	5	4	5	4	0	0	0	0
	MF	(England) ENG	Harry Bradshaw	34	18	30	17	3	1	1	0
	DF	(Scotland) SCO	James Cameron	4	0	4	0	0	0	0	0
	FW	(Scotland) SCO	James Cleland	1	0	0	0	0	0	1	0
	DF	(Scotland) SCO	John Curran	18	0	14	0	3	0	1	0
	MF	(Scotland) SCO	John Drummond	18	1	14	0	3	1	1	0
	DF	(Scotland) SCO	Billy Dunlop	5	0	4	0	0	0	1	0
	FW	(Scotland) SCO	John Givens	5	0	5	0	0	0	0	0
	MF	(Scotland) SCO	Patrick Gordon	5	1	5	1	0	0	0	0
	DF	(Scotland) SCO	Andrew Hannah	16	0	16	0	0	0	0	0
	FW	(Scotland) SCO	David Hannah	18	6	17	6	1	0	0	0
	FW	(Scotland) SCO	Hugh Henderson	2	0	2	0	0	0	0	0
	MF	(Scotland) SCO	Neil Kerr	12	3	12	3	0	0	0	0
	MF	(Scotland) SCO	James McBride	5	0	5	0	0	0	0	0
	GK	(Scotland) SCO	William McCann	17	0	15	0	2	0	0	0
	DF	(Scotland) SCO	John McCartney	31	0	28	0	3	0	0	0
	DF	(Scotland) SCO	Duncan McLean	26	0	24	0	2	0	0	0
	DF	(Scotland) SCO	John McLean	21	0	18	0	2	0	1	0
	DF	(Scotland) SCO	Joe McQue	32	1	29	1	3	0	0	0
	MF	(Scotland) SCO	Hugh McQueen	14	3	12	2	2	1	0	0
	GK	(Scotland) SCO	Matt McQueen	27	0	23	0	3	0	1	0
	MF	(Scotland) SCO	Malcolm McVean	24	7	20	5	3	2	1	0
	DF	(Scotland) SCO	Bobby Neill	1	0	0	0	0	0	1	0
	FW	(Scotland) SCO	Jimmy Ross	31	12	27	12	3	0	1	0
	GK	(England) ENG	John Whitehead	1	0	0	0	0	0	1	0
	FW	(England) ENG	Albert Worgan	1	0	1	0	0	0	0	0

== Table ==
Pos	Team	Pld	W	D	L	GF	GA	GAv	Pts	Relegation
12	Small Heath	30	9	7	14	50	74	0.676	25	
13	West Bromwich Albion	30	10	4	16	51	66	0.773	24	
14	Stoke (O)	30	9	6	15	50	67	0.746	24	Qualification for test matches
15	Derby County (O)	30	7	9	14	45	68	0.662	23	Qualification for test matches
16	Liverpool (R)	30	7	8	15	51	70	0.729	22	Qualification for test matches

Source: World Football
Rules for classification: 1) Points; 2) Goal average; 3) Goals scored
(O) Play-off winners; (R) Relegated

== Competitions ==
Win Draw Loss

=== League Division 1 ===
1 September 1894 1	Blackburn Rovers	1–1	Liverpool	Blackburn
	Hall 75'	Report	Bradshaw 25'	Stadium: Ewood Park; Attendance: 12,000

3 September 1894 2	Burnley	3–3	Liverpool	Burnley
	Crabtree 40'; Hill 46'; Egan 50'	Report	Gordon 10'; Bradshaw 48'; McQueen 75'	Stadium: Turf Moor; Attendance: 10,000

8 September 1894 3	Liverpool	1–2	Aston Villa	Liverpool
	Bradshaw 20'	Report	Smith 75'; Chatt 85'	Stadium: Anfield; Attendance: 20,000

13 September 1894 4	Liverpool	1–2	Bolton Wanderers	Liverpool
	Ross 40'	Report	Cassidy 2'; Tannahill 48'	Stadium: Anfield; Attendance: 6,000

15 September 1894 5	West Bromwich Albion	5–0	Liverpool	West Bromwich
	Richards; McLeod; Hutchinson; Williams (pen.); Bassett 12'	Report		Stadium: Stoney Lane; Attendance: 6,000

22 September 1894 6	Liverpool	2–2	Blackburn Rovers	Liverpool
	McVean 49'; McQueen 54'	Report	Stuart; Whitehead	Stadium: Anfield; Attendance: 14,000

29 September 1894 7	Wolverhampton Wanderers	3–1	Liverpool	Wolverhampton
	Wood; Reynolds 15'; Black 25'	Report	Ross (pen.)	Stadium: Molineux Stadium; Attendance: 5,000

6 October 1894 8	Liverpool	2–2	Sheffield United	Liverpool
	Kerr 25'; Bradshaw 44'	Report	Hammond 35'; Yates 89'	Stadium: Anfield; Attendance: 8,000

13 October 1894 9	Everton	3–0	Liverpool	Liverpool
	McInness 10'; Latta 60'; Bell 88'	Report		Stadium: Goodison Park; Attendance: 25,000

20 October 1894 10	Liverpool	2–0	Stoke City	Liverpool
	Ross 42', 50'	Report		Stadium: Anfield

27 October 1894 11	Aston Villa	5–0	Liverpool	Birmingham
	Dorrell; Cowan; Hodgetts; Reynolds (pen.)	Report		Stadium: Wellington Road; Attendance: 4,000

3 November 1894 12	Liverpool	0–3	Burnley	Liverpool
		Report	Nicol 25'; Turnbull 55'; Livingstone 80'	Stadium: Anfield; Attendance: 6,000

10 November 1894 13	Stoke City	3–1	Liverpool	Stoke-on-Trent
	Sandland 30', 70'; Schofield 80'	Report	Kerr 75'	Stadium: Victoria Ground; Attendance: 3,000

17 November 1894 14	Liverpool	2–2	Everton	Liverpool
	Hannah 55'; Ross 90' (pen.)	Report	Kelso 30' (pen.); Latta 85'	Stadium: Anfield; Attendance: 30,000

24 November 1894 15	Sunderland	3–2	Liverpool	Sunderland
	J. Hannah 75'; Campbell 77'; Gillespie 80'	Report	McVean 35'; D. Hannah 45'	Stadium: Newcastle Road; Attendance: 8,000

1 December 1894 16	Liverpool	3–3	Wolverhampton Wanderers	Liverpool
	Bradshaw 2'; McVean 80'	Report	Baugh; Reynolds	Stadium: Anfield; Attendance: 7,000

8 December 1894 17	Sheffield United	2–2	Liverpool	Sheffield
	Hammond 80', 84'	Report	Bradshaw 5', 65'	Stadium: Bramall Lane; Attendance: 10,000

15 December 1894 18	Liverpool	3–1	Small Heath	Liverpool
	Bradshaw 15', 30'; Hannah 55'	Report	Mobley 10'	Stadium: Anfield; Attendance: 3,000

25 December 1894 19	Bolton Wanderers	1–0	Liverpool	Bolton
	Settle 5'	Report		Stadium: Pike's Lane; Attendance: 8,000

29 December 1894 20	Small Heath	3–0	Liverpool	Birmingham
	Walton; Mobley; Lewis	Report		Stadium: Muntz Street; Attendance: 5,000

1 January 1895 21	Liverpool	4–0	West Bromwich Albion	Liverpool
	Bradshaw 57', 76'; Ross 81'; Hannah 84'	Report		Stadium: Anfield

5 January 1895 22	The Wednesday	5–0	Liverpool	Sheffield
	Spiksley 10', 70'; Woolhouse 28', 30'; Brandon 73'	Report		Stadium: Olive Grove; Attendance: 6,000

9 January 1895 23	Derby County	0–1	Liverpool	Derby
		Report	Ross 44'	Stadium: County Ground; Attendance: 6,000

12 January 1895 24	Liverpool	5–0	Nottingham Forest	Liverpool
	McVean 15', 17'; Ross 44'; McQue 65'; Hannah 87'	Report		Stadium: Anfield; Attendance: 5,000

2 March 1895 25	Liverpool	5–1	Derby County	Liverpool
	Bradshaw 5'; Kerr 20'; Ross; Hannah	Report	Goodall	Stadium: Anfield; Attendance: 12,000

25 March 1895 26	Liverpool	2–3	Sunderland	Liverpool
	Ross 45'; Becton 70'	Report	Campbell 10', 65'; Miller/Millar 88'	Stadium: Anfield; Attendance: 20,000

30 March 1895 27	Liverpool	4–2	The Wednesday	Liverpool
	Bradshaw 3', 88'; Becton 6', 60'	Report	Priestley; Brash	Stadium: Anfield; Attendance: 5,000

6 April 1895 28	Nottingham Forest	3–0	Liverpool	Nottingham
	Carnelly 2', 18'; McInnes 15'	Report		Stadium: Town Ground; Attendance: 4,000

12 April 1895 29	Preston North End	2–2	Liverpool	Preston
	Sanders 15'; McQueen 25' (o.g.)	Report	Ross 47'; Becton 75'	Stadium: Deepdale; Attendance: 10,000

20 April 1895 30	Liverpool	2–5	Preston North End	Liverpool
	Bradshaw 12', 84'	Report	Cunningham 10'; Pierce 20', 50'; Smith 40'; Henderson 55'	Stadium: Anfield; Attendance: 14,000

=== F.A. Cup ===
2 February 1895 1	Barnsley St Peters	1–1	Liverpool	Barnsley
	Cutts 80'	Report	McVean 25'	Stadium: Oakwell; Attendance: 4,000

11 February 1895 1	Liverpool	4–0	Barnsley St Peters	Liverpool
	Bradshaw 15'; Drummond 40'; M. McQueen 42'; H. McQueen 60'	Report		Stadium: Anfield; Attendance: 4,000

16 February 1895 2	Liverpool	0–2	Nottingham Forest	Liverpool
		Report	Stewart 10'; McInnes 40'	Stadium: Anfield; Attendance: 5,000

=== Test Match ===
Liverpool lost 1-0 to Bury on 27 April and were relegated back to the second division.

27 April 1895	Bury	1–0	Liverpool	Blackburn
	Millar 32'; Montgomery (red card) 76'	Report		Stadium: Ewood Park; Attendance: 5,000

=== Lancashire Senior Cup ===
19 January 1895	Burnley	0–4	Liverpool	Burnley
		Report	Ross 7'; Espie 20' (o.g.); Bradshaw 37', 47'	Stadium: Turf Moor; Attendance: 5,000

9 February 1895	Liverpool	2–1	Blackburn Rovers	Liverpool
	Ross 25'; Bradshaw 40'	Report	Goal	Stadium: Anfield; Attendance: 12,000

9 March 1895 SF	Everton	1–0	Liverpool	Liverpool
	Goal	Report		Stadium: Goodison Park; Attendance: 28,000

=== Liverpool Senior Cup ===
18 March 1895 SF	Liverpool	5–2	Chester City	Liverpool
	Bradshaw; McCartney; Kerr; Hannah	Report	Charlie Spencer; Dunlop (o.g)	Stadium: Anfield; Attendance: 5,000

29 April 1895 F	Everton	3–0	Liverpool	Liverpool
	Goal	Report		Stadium: Goodison Park; Attendance: 4,000

=== Palatine League ===
26 January 1895	Newton Heath	3–0	Liverpool	Manchester
	Goal	Report		Stadium: Bank Street; Attendance: 3,500

16 March 1895	Liverpool	1–1	Newton Heath	Liverpool
	McQueen	Report	Goal	Stadium: Anfield; Attendance: 5,000

1 April 1895	Bolton Wanderers	7–2	Liverpool	Bolton
	Goal	Report	Ross; Drummond 8'	Stadium: Pike's Lane; Attendance: Unknown

=== Friendlies ===
27 November 1894	Darwen	4–3	Liverpool	Darwen
	Goal	Report	Ross; McQueen 41'	Stadium: Barley Bank; Attendance: Unknown

26 December 1894	Everton	2–1	Liverpool	Liverpool
	Goal	Report	Bradshaw 20'	Stadium: Goodison Park; Attendance: 20,000

23 February 1895	Cortinthians	5–2	Liverpool	Leyton
	Goal	Report	Bradshaw	Stadium: Leyton; Attendance: 5,000

25 February 1895	Woolwich Arsenal	4–3	Liverpool	London
	Goal	Report	Bradshaw; Kerr; Ross	Stadium: Nightingale Lane; Attendance: 1,500

13 April 1895	Liverpool	2–2	Cortinthians	Liverpool
	Ross; Kerr 45'	Report	Goal	Stadium: Anfield; Attendance: 2,000

15 April 1895	Liverpool	1–1	Everton	Liverpool
	Ross	Report	Goal	Stadium: Anfield; Attendance: 12,000
