= List of Liverpool F.C. records and statistics =

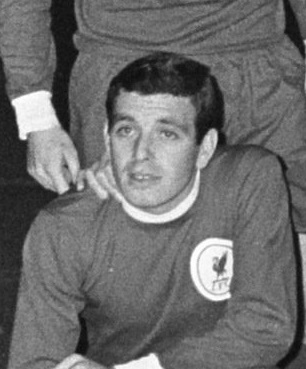
Ian Callaghan holds the record for the most appearances made for Liverpool with 857.

Liverpool Football Club is an English professional association football club based in Liverpool, Merseyside, who currently play in the Premier League. They have played at their current home ground, Anfield, since their foundation in 1892. Liverpool joined the Football League in 1894, and were founding members of the Premier League in 1992.

This list encompasses the major honours won by Liverpool, records set by the club, their managers and their players. The player records section includes details of the club's leading goalscorers and those who have made the most appearances in first-team competitions. It also records notable achievements by Liverpool players on the international stage, and the highest transfer fees paid and received by the club. Attendance records at Anfield are also included in the list.

The club have won 20 top-flight titles, and also hold the record for the most European Cup victories by an English team, winning the competition six times. The club's record appearance maker is Ian Callaghan, who made 857 appearances between 1958 and 1978. Ian Rush is the club's record goalscorer, scoring 346 goals in total.

All statistics are correct as of 26 August 2025.

== Honours ==
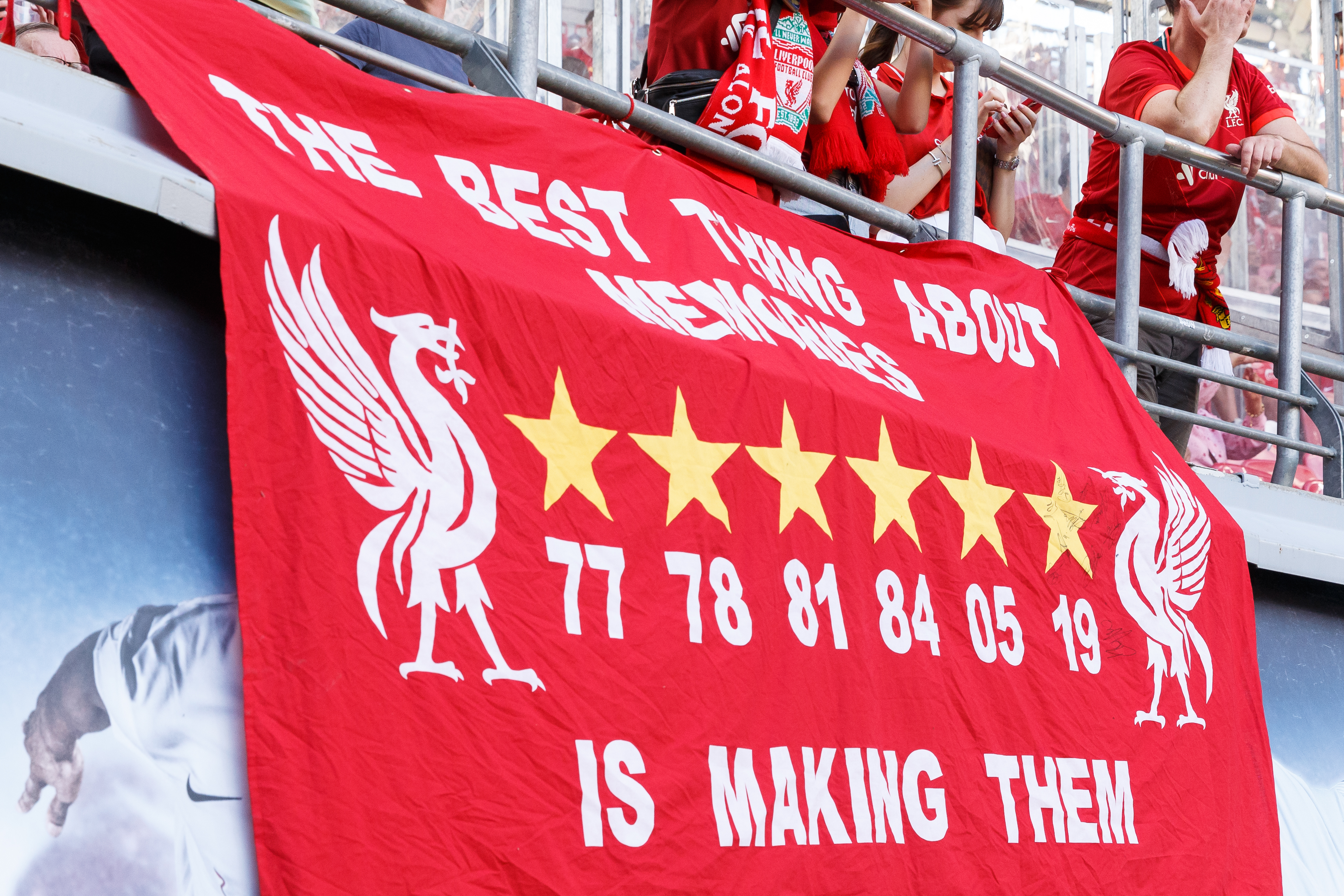
Liverpool fans' banner dedicated to the club's six European Cup wins.

Liverpool have won honours both domestically and in European cup competitions. They have won the English League title for a joint-record 20 times, the League Cup a record ten times and an English record of six European Cups. In their first season, 1892–93, they won the Lancashire League title and the Liverpool District Cup, and their most recent success came in 2025, when they won their twentieth League title.

Liverpool F.C. honours
Honour	No.	Years
Football League First Division/Premier League	20	1900–01, 1905–06, 1921–22, 1922–23, 1946–47, 1963–64, 1965–66, 1972–73, 1975–76, 1976–77, 1978–79, 1979–80, 1981–82, 1982–83, 1983–84, 1985–86, 1987–88, 1989–90, 2019–20, 2024–25
Football League Second Division	4	1893–94, 1895–96, 1904–05, 1961–62
FA Cup	8	1965, 1974, 1986, 1989, 1992, 2001, 2006, 2022
League Cup	10	1981, 1982, 1983, 1984, 1995, 2001, 2003, 2012, 2022, 2024
FA Community/Charity Shield (Note: Between 1949 and 1993 the Community Shield was usually shared if the game was drawn.)	16	1964*, 1965*, 1966, 1974, 1976, 1977*, 1979, 1980, 1982, 1986*, 1988, 1989, 1990*, 2001, 2006, 2022 (* shared)
Sheriff of London Charity Shield	1	1906
Football League Super Cup	1	1985–86
European Cup/UEFA Champions League	6	1977, 1978, 1981, 1984, 2005, 2019
UEFA Cup	3	1973, 1976, 2001
European/UEFA Super Cup	4	1977, 2001, 2005, 2019
FIFA Club World Cup	1	2019

== Player records ==
=== Appearances ===
- Most appearances in all competitions: Ian Callaghan, 857
- Most league appearances: Ian Callaghan, 640
- Most FA Cup appearances: Ian Callaghan, 79
- Most League Cup appearances: Ian Rush, 78
- Most continental appearances: Jamie Carragher, 150
- Youngest first-team player: Jerome Sinclair, 16 years and 6 days (against West Bromwich Albion, 26 September 2012)
- Youngest player to start a first-team match: Rio Ngumoha, 16 years and 135 days (against Accrington Stanley, 11 January 2025)
- Youngest player to reach 100 appearances: Michael Owen. 19 years and 363 days.
- Oldest first-team player: Ned Doig, 41 years and 165 days (against Newcastle United, 11 April 1908)
- Oldest debutant: Ned Doig, 37 years and 307 days (against Burton United, 1 September 1904)
- Most consecutive appearances: Phil Neal, 417 (23 October 1976 – 24 September 1983)
- Most seasons playing every minute of every league and cup game: Phil Neal, 9 (from 1976–77 to 1983–84)
- Longest-serving player: Elisha Scott, 21 years and 52 days (1913–1934)
- Most red cards while playing for Liverpool: Steven Gerrard, 7

=== Most appearances ===
Competitive, professional matches only, appearances as substitute in brackets.

Players with most appearances for Liverpool F.C.
Rank	Player	Years	League (Note: Includes the Football League and the Premier League.)	FA Cup	League Cup	Other (Note: The "Other" column includes goals and appearances (including those as a substitute) in UEFA Champions League, UEFA Europa League, UEFA Cup Winners Cup, UEFA Super Cup, FA Community Shield, Intercontinental Cup, FIFA Club World Cup, Football League Centenary Trophy and Football League Super Cup matches.)	Total
1	(England) Ian Callaghan	1960–1978	640 (4)	79 (2)	42 (7)	96 (1)	857 (14)
2	(England) Jamie Carragher	1996–2013	508 (24)	40 (1)	35 (7)	152 (3)	737 (35)
3	(England) Steven Gerrard	1998–2015	504 (39)	42 (5)	30 (5)	134 (14)	710 (63)
4	(England) Ray Clemence	1967–1981	470 (0)	54 (0)	55 (0)	86 (0)	665 (0)
4	(England) Emlyn Hughes	1967–1979	474 (0)	62 (0)	46 (0)	83 (0)	665 (0)
6	(Wales) Ian Rush	1980–1987; 1988–1996	469 (22)	61 (5)	78 (0)	52 (3)	660 (30)
7	(England) Phil Neal	1974–1985	455 (2)	45 (0)	66 (0)	81 (0)	650 (2)
8	(England) Tommy Smith	1962–1978	467 (0)	52 (0)	30 (0)	89 (1)	638 (1)
9	(Zimbabwe) Bruce Grobbelaar	1981–1994	440 (0)	62 (0)	70 (0)	56 (0)	628 (0)
10	(Scotland) Alan Hansen	1977–1991	434 (0)	58 (1)	68 (0)	60 (1)	620 (2)

=== Goalscorers ===
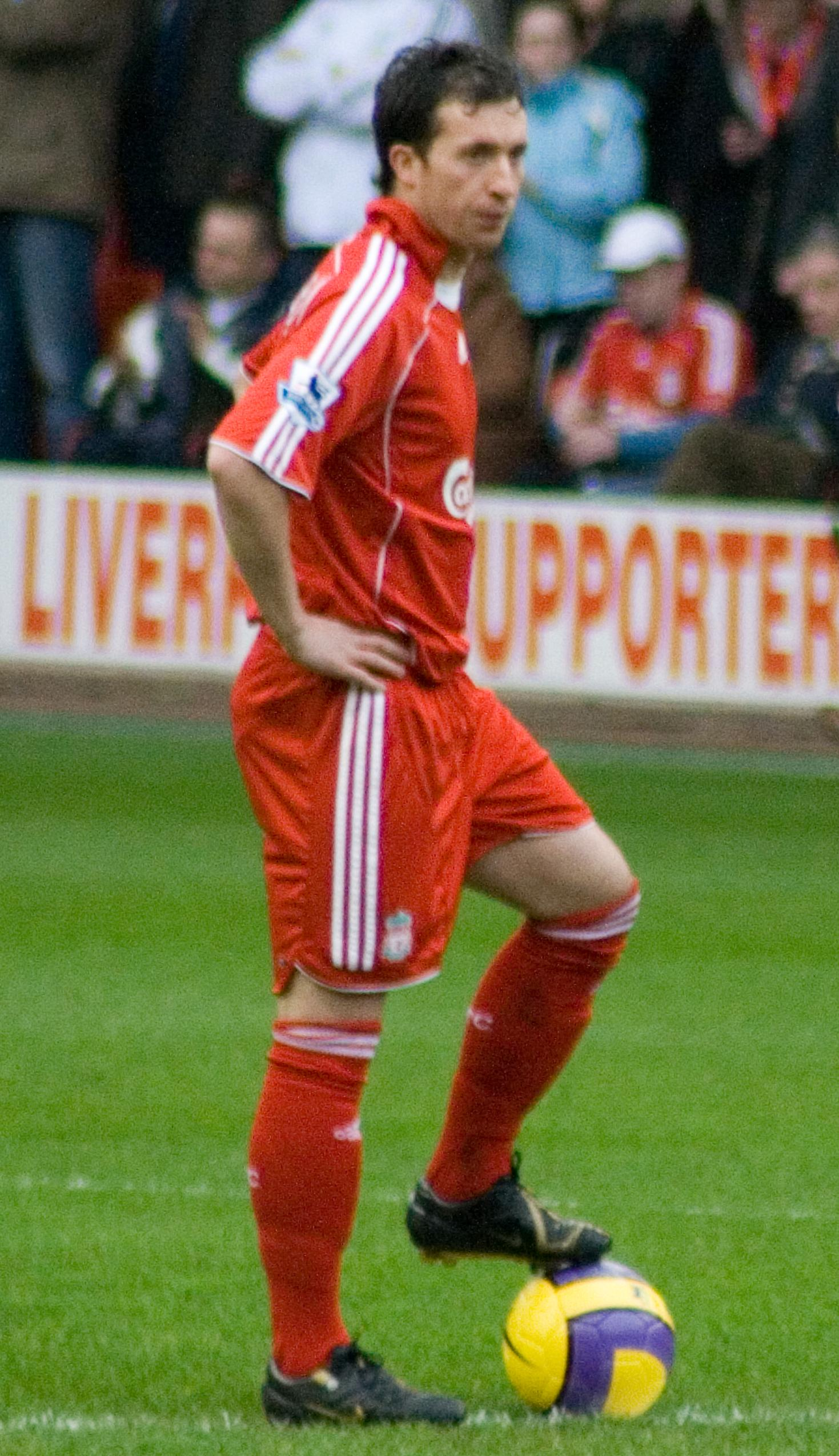
Robbie Fowler, who scored the fastest hat-trick in Liverpool's history.

- Most goals in all competitions: Ian Rush, 346
- Most league goals: Roger Hunt, 244
- Most FA Cup goals: Ian Rush, 39
- Most League Cup goals: Ian Rush, 48
- Most continental goals: Mohamed Salah, 51
- First player to score for Liverpool: Malcolm McVean (against Rotherham Town, 1 September 1892)
- Most goals in a season: Ian Rush, 47 (in the 1983–84 season)
- Most goals in a debut season: Mohamed Salah, 44 (in the 2017–18 season)
- Most league goals in a season: Roger Hunt, 41 (in the 1961–62 season)
- Most goals in a season by a Liverpool player in the Premier League era: Mohamed Salah, 44 (in the 2017–18 season)
- Most top-flight league goals in a season: Gordon Hodgson, 36 (in the 1930–31 season)
- Most continental goals in a season: Mohamed Salah and Roberto Firmino, 11 (in the 2017–18 season)
- Most hat-tricks in a season: Roger Hunt, 5 (in the 1961–62 season)
- Most games scored in during a single campaign: Mohamed Salah, 34 (in the 2017–18 season)
- Most different goalscorers in a season: 22 (in the 2015–16 season)
- Most hat-tricks: Gordon Hodgson, 17
- Most consecutive games where a player has scored: Mohamed Salah, 10 (28 August 2021 to 24 October 2021)
- Most consecutive home games from the start of a season where a player has scored: Mohamed Salah, 6 (19 August 2023 to 12 November 2023).
- Fastest goal scored in a match: Paul Walsh, 14 seconds, (against West Ham United, 27 August 1984)
- Fastest hat-trick: Robbie Fowler, 4 minutes, 33 seconds, (against Arsenal, 28 August 1994)
- Highest-scoring substitute: David Fairclough, 18
- Most penalties scored: Steven Gerrard, 47
- Most consecutive games a player has scored for Liverpool at Anfield: Mohamed Salah, 9 (13 February 2023 to 6 May 2023)
- Most seasons with at least 30 goals in all competitions in Liverpool history: 5 (Roger Hunt, Ian Rush, Mohamed Salah)
- Most consecutive seasons with at least 20 goals in all competitions: Mohamed Salah, 8 (2017–18 to 2024–25)
- Most games for an outfield player without scoring: Ephraim Longworth, 371
- Youngest goalscorer: Rio Ngumoha, 16 years, 361 days (against Newcastle United, 25 August 2025)
- Oldest goalscorer: Billy Liddell, 38 years, 55 days (against Stoke City, 5 March 1960)

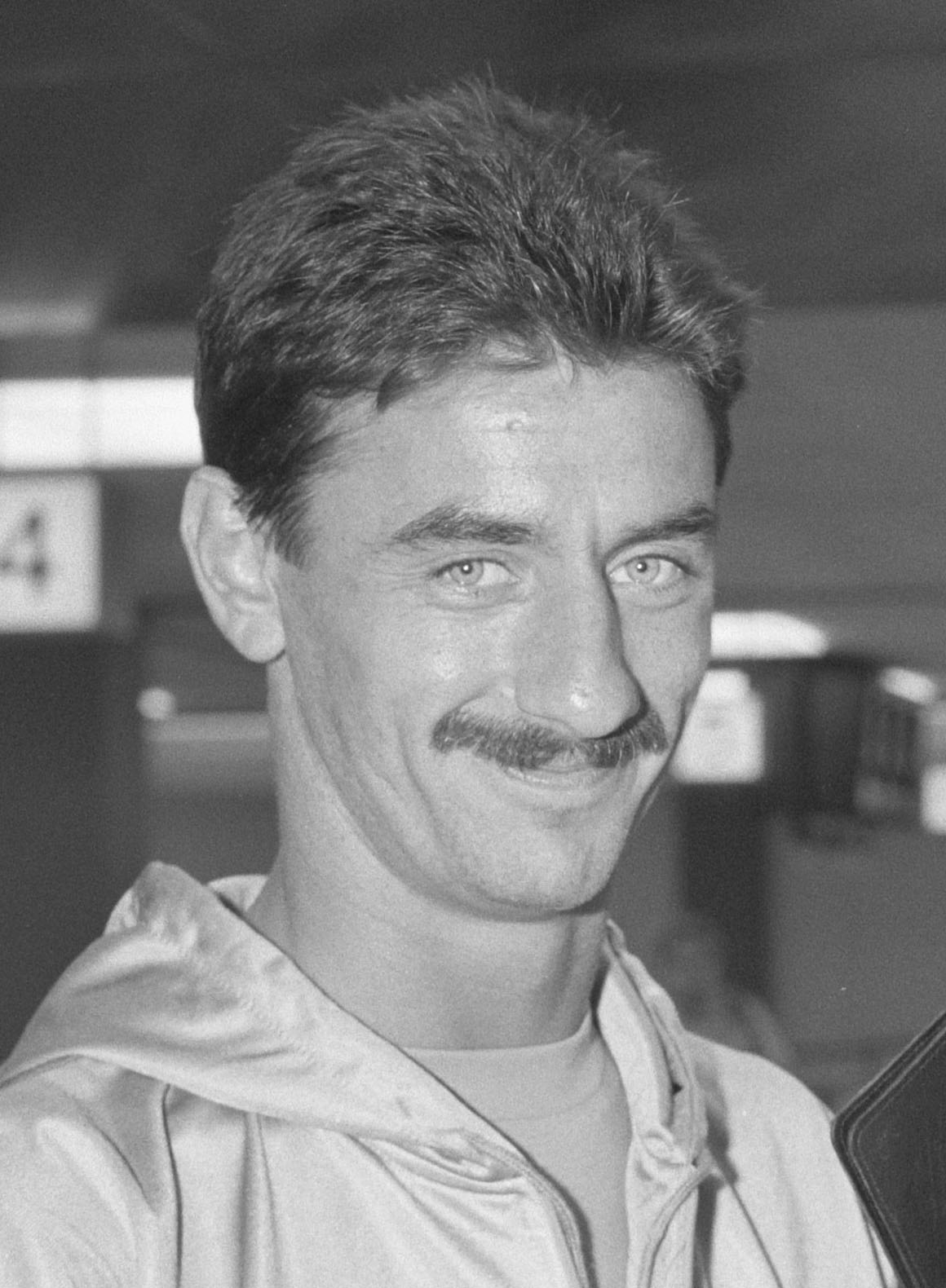
Ian Rush is Liverpool's all-time record goalscorer.

=== Top goalscorers ===
Competitive, professional matches only. Matches played (including as a substitute) appear in brackets.

Top goalscorers for Liverpool F.C.
Rank	Player	Years	League	FA Cup	League Cup	Other	Total
1	(Wales) Ian Rush	1980–1987; 1988–1996	229 (469)	39 (61)	48 (78)	30 (52)	346 (660)
2	(England) Roger Hunt	1958–1969	244 (404)	18 (44)	5 (10)	18 (34)	285 (492)
3	(Egypt) Mohamed Salah	2017–2026	191 (315)	8 (15)	4 (11)	54 (100)	257 (442)
4	(England) Gordon Hodgson	1925–1936	233 (358)	8 (19)	0 (0)	0 (0)	241 (377)
5	(Scotland) Billy Liddell	1938–1961	215 (498)	13 (46)	0 (0)	0 (0)	228 (534)
6	(England) Steven Gerrard	1998–2015	120 (504)	15 (42)	9 (30)	42 (134)	186 (710)
7	(England) Robbie Fowler	1993–2001; 2006–2007	128 (266)	12 (24)	29 (35)	14 (44)	183 (369)
8	(Scotland) Kenny Dalglish	1977–1990	118 (355)	13 (37)	27 (59)	14 (64)	172 (515)
9	(England) Michael Owen	1996–2004	118 (216)	8 (15)	9 (14)	23 (52)	158 (297)
10	(England) Harry Chambers	1915–1928	135 (315)	16 (28)	0 (0)	0 (1)	151 (339)

=== International ===
- First capped player: Frank Becton, for England on 29 March 1897
- Most international caps while being a Liverpool player: Steven Gerrard, 114 for England
- Most international goals while being a Liverpool player: Mohamed Salah, 37 for Egypt.

==== FIFA World Cup ====
- First Liverpool player to appear at a World Cup: Laurie Hughes for England, at 1950 FIFA World Cup
- Most World Cup appearances while a Liverpool player: Steven Gerrard, 12 for England in 2006, 2010 and 2014
- Most World Cup goals while being a Liverpool player: Michael Owen, 4 for England in 1998 and 2002
- First World Cup winners: Roger Hunt, Ian Callaghan and Gerry Byrne, in 1966 with England
- First non-British player to appear in a World Cup final: Dietmar Hamann, with Germany, in 2002
- Non-British World Cup winners:
  - Fernando Torres and Pepe Reina, with Spain in 2010
  - Alexis Mac Allister, with Argentina in 2022
  - Víctor Muñoz, with Spain in 2026

UEFA European Championship

- UEFA European Championship winners while playing for Liverpool:
  - Fernando Torres, Pepe Reina, Xabi Alonso and Álvaro Arbeloa, with Spain in 2008.

Copa America

- Copa America winners while playing for Liverpool:
  - Luis Suárez, with Uruguay in 2011.
  - Alisson and Roberto Firmino, with Brazil in 2019.
  - Alexis Mac Allister, with Argentina in 2024.

Africa Cup of Nations

- Africa Cup of Nations winners while playing for Liverpool:
  - Rigobert Song with Cameroon in 2000.
  - Kolo Touré with Ivory Coast in 2015.
  - Sadio Mané with Senegal in 2022.

OFC Nations Cup

- Oceanic Nations Cup winners while playing for Liverpool:
  - Harry Kewell with Australia in 2004.

== Transfers ==
For consistency, fees in the record transfer tables below are all sourced from BBC Sport's contemporary reports of each transfer.

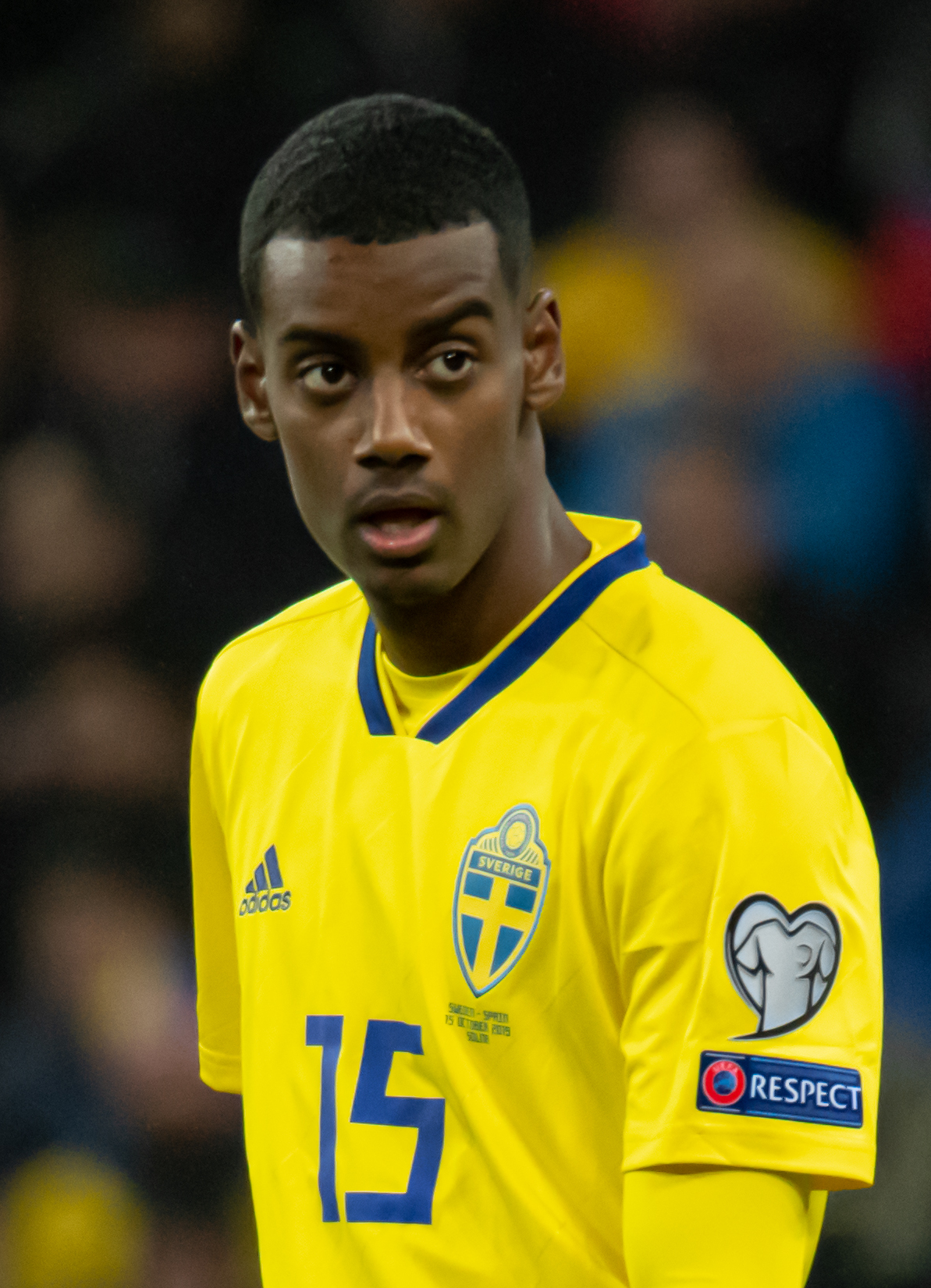
Alexander Isak is Liverpool's record signing.

=== Record transfer fees paid ===
Record transfer fees paid by Liverpool F.C.
Rank	Player:	From:	Fee:	Date:	Ref.
1	(Sweden) Alexander Isak	(England) Newcastle United	£125 million	1 September 2025	
2	(France) Bradley Barcola	(France) Paris Saint Germain	£123 million	31 August 2026	
3	(Germany) Florian Wirtz	(Germany) Bayer Leverkusen	£116 million	20 June 2025	
4	(Netherlands) Virgil van Dijk	(England) Southampton	£75 million	1 January 2018	
5	(France) Hugo Ekitike	(Germany) Eintracht Frankfurt	£69 million	23 July 2025	

=== Record transfer fees received ===
Record transfer fees received by Liverpool F.C.
Rank	Player	To	Fee	Date	Ref.
1	(Brazil) Philippe Coutinho	(Spain) Barcelona	£145 million	6 January 2018	
2	(Uruguay) Luis Suárez	(Spain) Barcelona	£75 million	11 July 2014	
3	(Colombia) Luis Díaz	(Germany) Bayern Munich	£65.5 million	30 July 2025	
4	(Spain) Fernando Torres	(England) Chelsea	£50 million	31 January 2011	
5	(England) Raheem Sterling	(England) Manchester City	£49 million	20 July 2015	

== Managerial records ==
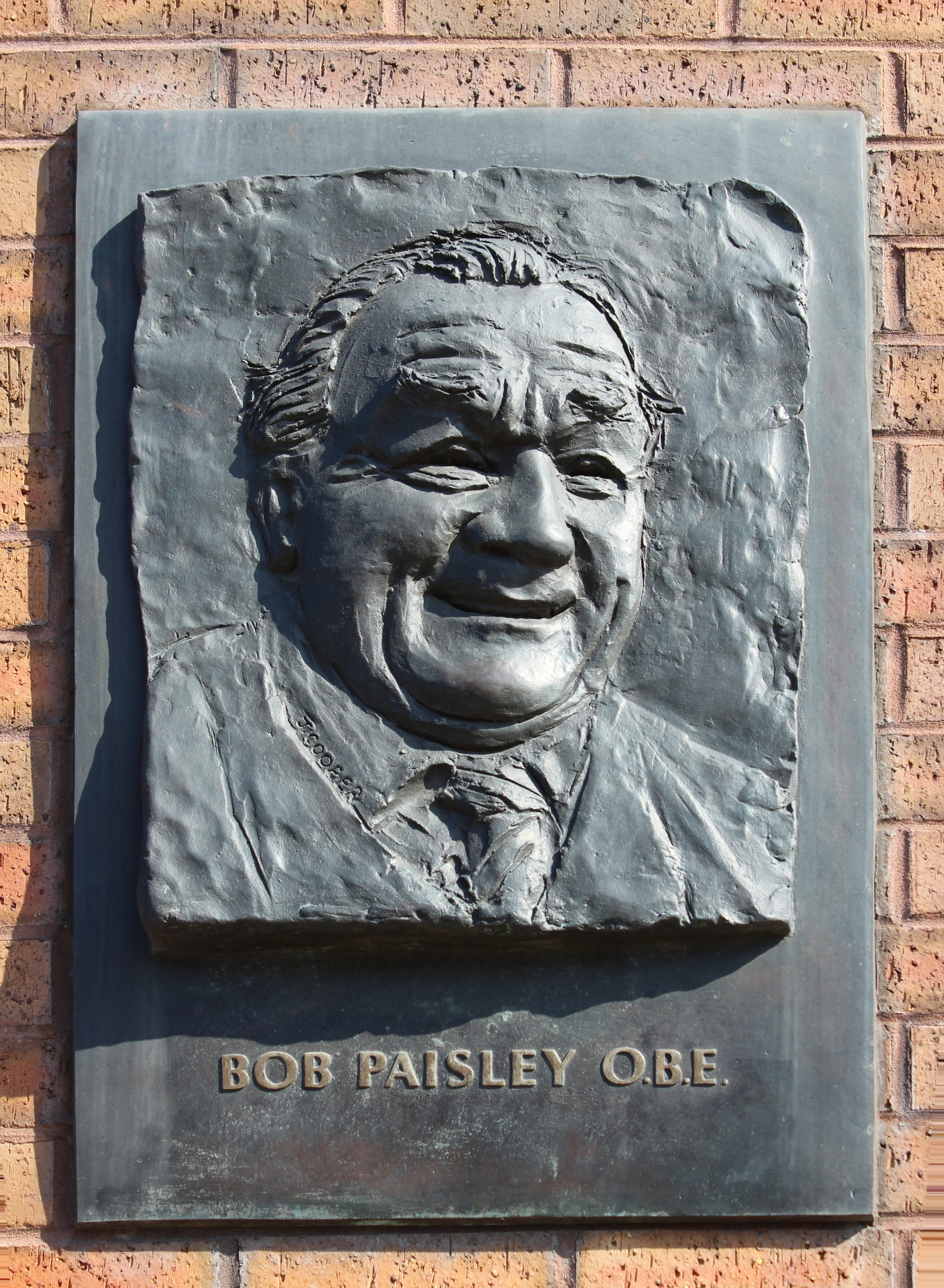
Bob Paisley is Liverpool's most successful manager of all time.

- First managers: William Edward Barclay and John McKenna, from 15 February 1892 to 16 August 1896
- Longest-serving manager by time: Tom Watson, from 17 August 1896 to 6 May 1915 (18 years, 262 days)
- Longest-serving manager by matches: Bill Shankly managed the club for 783 matches over a period of 14 years and seven months, from December 1959 to July 1974
- Most matches managed: 783, Bill Shankly
- Most matches won as manager: 407, Bill Shankly
- Most matches lost as a manager: 272, Tom Watson
- Most goals scored under a manager: 1,307, Bill Shankly
- Most goals conceded under a manager: 1,056, Tom Watson
- Most successful manager: Bob Paisley, won 20 trophies with the club

== Club records ==
=== Matches ===
==== Firsts ====
- First match: Liverpool 7–1 Rotherham Town, a friendly match, 1 September 1892
- First Lancashire League match: Liverpool 8–0 Higher Walton, 3 September 1892
- First Football League match: Liverpool 2–0 Middlesbrough Ironopolis, Second Division, 2 September 1893
- First FA Cup match: Liverpool 4–0 Nantwich Town, first qualifying round, 15 October 1892
- First League Cup match: Liverpool 1–1 Luton Town, second round, 19 October 1960
- First European match: Liverpool 5–0 KR Reykjavik, European Cup, first round, 17 August 1964

==== Wins ====
- Record win: 11–0 against Strømsgodset in the European Cup Winners' Cup, 17 September 1974
- Record league wins: 10–1 against Rotherham Town in the Second Division, 18 February 1896, 9–0 against Crystal Palace in the First Division, 12 September 1989 and 9–0 against Bournemouth in the Premier League, 27 August 2022
- Record home league win: 9–0 against Crystal Palace in First Division, 12 September 1989 and 9–0 against Bournemouth in the Premier League, 27 August 2022
- Record away league win: 7–0 against Crystal Palace in Premier League, 19 December 2020
- Record FA Cup win: 9–0 against Newtown in the second qualifying round, 29 October 1892
- Record League Cup win: 10–0 against Fulham in the second round, first leg, 23 September 1986
- Most league wins in a season:

38 games: 32 wins (in the 2019–20 season)

- Fewest league wins in a season: 7 wins from 30 games (in the 1894–95 season)
- Most home wins in a season (all competitions): 22 (in the 2000–01, 2018–19 and 2019–20 seasons
- Most league wins away from home in a season: 14 (in the 2019–20 season)

==== Defeats ====
- Record defeat: 1–9 against Birmingham City in Second Division, 11 December 1954
- Record defeat at Anfield: 0–6 against Sunderland in First Division, 19 April 1930
- Record-scoring defeat: 2–9 against Newcastle United in First Division, 1 January 1934
- Record Premier League defeat: 1–6 against Stoke City, 24 May 2015, 0–5 against Manchester City, 9 September 2017, 2–7 against Aston Villa, 4 October 2020
- Record FA Cup defeat: 0–5 against Bolton Wanderers in fourth round, first leg, 26 January 1946
- Record League Cup defeat: 0–5 against Aston Villa in quarter-finals, 17 December 2019
- Most league defeats in a season: 23 defeats from 42 games (in the 1953–54 season)
- Fewest defeats in a season: Unbeaten in the 28-game 1893–94 season

==== Record consecutive results ====
- Record consecutive wins: 11 (18 February – 11 April 1989, and 15 March – 7 May 2006)
- Record consecutive league wins: 18 (27 October 2019 – 24 February 2020)
- Record consecutive league wins from start of season: 8 (in the 1990–91 and 2019–20 seasons)
- Record consecutive defeats: 9 (29 April – 14 October 1899)
- Record consecutive league matches without a defeat: 44 (12 January 2019 – 24 February 2020)
- Record consecutive home league wins: 24 (9 February 2019 – 5 July 2020)
- Record consecutive draws: 6 (19 February – 19 March 1975)
- Record consecutive home matches without defeat: 85 (7 February 1978 – 31 January 1981)
- Record consecutive home league matches without defeat: 68 (7 May 2017 – 17 January 2021)
- Record consecutive matches in which Liverpool have scored a goal: 34 (19 April 2021 – 22 December 2021)
- Record consecutive matches without conceding a goal: 11 (29 October – 18 December 2005)
- Record consecutive home league defeats: 6 (21 January – 7 March 2021)

=== Goals ===
- Most goals scored in a season: 147 during the 2021–22 season.
- Most league goals scored in a season: 106 in 30 games (in the 1895–96 season, Second Division)
- Most top-flight goals scored in a season: 101 in 38 games (in the 2013–14 season, Premier League)
- Fewest league goals scored in a season: 42 in 34 games (in the 1901–02 season, First Division) and 42 in 42 games (in the 1970–71 season, First Division)
- Most league goals conceded in a season: 97 in 42 games (in the 1953–54 season, First Division)
- Fewest league goals conceded in a season: 16 in 42 games (in the 1978–79 season, First Division)
- Most consecutive league matches with a Liverpool goal: 44 (21 September 2024 to 9 November 2025)
- Most consecutive league matches with a Liverpool goal since the start of a season: 27 (in the 2019–20 season)
- Most consecutive away league matches with a Liverpool goal: 26 (27 April 2024 to 9 November 2025)

=== Points ===
- Most points in a season:

Two points for a win: 68 (in 42 games in 1978–79, First Division)
Three points for a win: 99 points in 38 games in 2019–20, Premier League)

- Fewest points in a season:

Two points for a win: 22 (in 30 games in 1894–95, First Division)
Three points for a win: 52 (in 38 games in 2011–12, Premier League)

=== Attendances ===
- Record highest home attendance: 61,905 (against Wolverhampton Wanderers in the 1951–52 FA Cup) (Note: Attendance against Wolves also represents the record highest FA Cup attendance.)
- Highest league home attendance: 60,420 (against Ipswich Town, Premier League in the 2024-25 season)
- Highest League Cup home attendance: 60,214 (against Chelsea, in the 2026–27 season)
- Highest European home attendance: 59,916 (against Real Madrid, UEFA Champions League Group Phase, in the 2025-26 season)
- Record lowest home attendance: 1,000 (against Loughborough, Second Division in the 1895–96 season) (Note: Attendance against Loughborough also represents the record lowest league attendance.)
- Lowest FA Cup home attendance: 4,000 (against Newtown, in the 1892–93 season)
- Lowest League Cup home attendance: 9,902 (against Brentford in the 1983–84 season)
- Lowest European home attendance: 12,021 (against Dundalk in the 1982–83 season)

An attendance of 95,446 was recorded for Liverpool's pre-season friendly against Melbourne Victory in July 2013 at the Melbourne Cricket Ground, Australia; the largest ever crowd for a football match in Victoria at the time, as well as the highest in Liverpool's history In July 2018, Liverpool bested this attendance with a 101,254 strong crowd at Michigan Stadium in a game against Manchester United in the 2018 International Champions Cup

== Bibliography ==
- Kelly, Stephen F. (1988). The Official Illustrated History of Liverpool FC: You'll Never Walk Alone. London: Queen Anne Press. ISBN 0-356-19594-5.
- Pead, Brian (1986). Liverpool A Complete Record. Breedon Books. ISBN 0-907969-15-1.
- Rollin, Jack and Glenda (2006). Sky Sports Football Yearbook 2006–2007. Headline. ISBN 0-7553-1526-X.
