= List of Liverpool F.C. managers =

Andoni Iraola is Liverpool's current head manager, serving from June 2026.

Liverpool Football Club is an English association football club based in Liverpool, Merseyside. Liverpool won the First Division title for the first time in 1901; overall, the club has won 20 league titles, along with eight FA Cups and ten League Cups. They have also been crowned champions of European football on six occasions by winning the European Cup/UEFA Champions League in 1977, 1978, 1981, 1984, 2005 and 2019. The club was one of 22 members of the Premier League when it was founded in 1992.

Liverpool have had 23 full-time managers. The most successful person to manage Liverpool is Bob Paisley, who won six Football League titles, six Charity Shields, three Football League Cups, three European Cups, one UEFA Super Cup and one UEFA Cup in his nine-year reign as manager. The club's longest-serving manager was Tom Watson, who managed the club from 1896 to 1915, totalling 19 years. Kenny Dalglish is one of 2 men to have managed the club twice. He first managed Liverpool from 1985 to February 1991, and then from January 2011 to June 2012.

This chronological list comprises all those who have held the position of manager of the first team of Liverpool since their foundation in 1892. Each manager's entry includes his dates of tenure and the club's overall competitive record (in terms of matches won, drawn and lost), honours won and significant achievements while under his care. Caretaker managers are included, where known, as well as those who have been in permanent charge.

== Managerial history ==
=== 1892–1959 ===
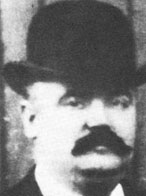
Tom Watson (1859–1915), Liverpool's longest-serving manager who managed the club from 1896 to 1915, totalling 19 years

The first Liverpool managers, William Edward Barclay and John McKenna, were appointed in 1892. Barclay acted as secretary-manager, overseeing the administrative side of the club, while McKenna took charge of matters on the field. The two worked in tandem as Liverpool won promotion from the Lancashire League in the club's first season. However, in 1896, McKenna appointed Tom Watson as manager. He went on to win two Football League championships. As the First World War broke out, Watson was embarking on his nineteenth season in charge at Anfield. It was to be his last, because he died in May 1915, aged 56. David Ashworth was appointed manager when football resumed after the War. Ashworth won one league title, but left for Oldham Athletic soon after this. He was replaced in February 1923 by a Liverpool director, Matt McQueen, who won one league title for the club. However, this marked the beginning of a barren spell spanning more than 20 years before Liverpool finally regained the title in 1947 under the stewardship of George Kay. Kay also led Liverpool to the FA Cup Final in 1950, but lost the game 2–0 to Arsenal. He retired the following year, owing to ill-health. The next manager, Don Welsh became the first Liverpool manager to be sacked after leading the club to relegation in 1954. His successor, Phil Taylor, also failed to win a trophy or gain promotion back to the top flight during his reign as boss.

=== 1959–1991 ===
On 1 December 1959, Bill Shankly was appointed manager, beginning a fifteen-year spell as manager that brought three league titles, two FA Cups and a first European trophy, the UEFA Cup, to Anfield. Shankly's reign as manager is famous for the establishment of the Anfield boot room as the location for his tactical discussions with his coaches. When he was not managing the club, Shankly was usually at his typewriter, personally replying to the letters which arrived at Melwood. Shankly even called some supporters at home to discuss the previous day's game, while the accounts of him providing tickets for fans are endless. When Shankly retired in 1974, he was replaced by his assistant, Bob Paisley. During the next nine seasons, Paisley proceeded to win six league titles and three European Cups to become the most successful manager in the history of the club. When Paisley retired in 1983, his assistant Joe Fagan took over, and continued the Boot Room tradition, and winning a treble of League, European Cup and League Cup in his first season. He again guided Liverpool to a European Cup Final, but the match was overshadowed by the Heysel Stadium disaster, and he retired soon after. Striker Kenny Dalglish was then made the club's first player-manager and in his first season in charge, Dalglish led the club to a League and FA Cup double. After that great first season, Dalglish led Liverpool to a further two league titles and another FA Cup. However, the Hillsborough disaster overshadowed his reign; it was one of the reasons for Dalglish resigning on 22 February 1991.

=== 1991–2015 ===
First-team coach Ronnie Moran took charge of team affairs for several weeks before Graeme Souness was named as Dalglish's successor. Under Souness, Liverpool won the FA Cup in 1992, but nothing else. He made way for Roy Evans, who also won just one trophy, the League Cup, before Gérard Houllier was appointed joint manager with Evans in 1998. This arrangement lasted only 18 games before Evans resigned, leaving Houllier—Liverpool's first non-British manager—in sole charge. Houllier won nothing until a cup treble in 2001, consisting of the FA Cup, League Cup and UEFA Cup. Houllier underwent major heart surgery during the 2001–02 season, but the squad was unaffected and managed to hold on to a second-place finish. Although Phil Thompson stepped in as temporary manager while Houllier was recovering from heart surgery, the matches played under Thompson are included in Houllier's record. Another League Cup was won in 2003, but this was to be Houllier's last trophy as Liverpool manager as he and the club parted by mutual consent at the end of the 2003–04 season, to be replaced by Valencia manager, Rafael Benítez.

In Benítez's first season in charge, Liverpool reached the UEFA Champions League Final, where they beat A.C. Milan on penalties, after the match finished 3–3 after extra time. The following season, Liverpool reached the FA Cup Final, where they beat West Ham United, again on penalties after a 3–3 draw. Benítez again guided Liverpool to a Champions League Final in 2007, but this time A.C. Milan beat them 2–1. On 3 June 2010, Benitez paid the price for a disappointing 2009–10 season when Liverpool announced he had left the club by mutual consent after six years in charge. Benitez, who was one year into a five-year contract, finalised his departure after agreeing a severance payment. Benitez's assistant Sammy Lee took over the reins at Liverpool until Managing director Christian Purslow and former manager Kenny Dalglish found a replacement. On 1 July 2010, former Fulham boss Roy Hodgson was confirmed as the new manager. After a poor tenure, which included Liverpool being 18th after 6 games, and only one away win during Hodgson's time in charge, Hodgson was sacked on 8 January 2011 and was replaced by former manager Kenny Dalglish the day before a 3rd Round FA Cup game against Manchester United. Dalglish signed a three-year contract as permanent manager in May, but was sacked a year later. Although the 2011–12 season ended with a poor 8th-place finish in the Premier League, Dalglish guided Liverpool to two Cup finals at Wembley, ending in a loss to Chelsea. He was replaced by Brendan Rodgers on 1 June 2012.

Rodgers led them in the 2013–14 season to a surprise title challenge, however Liverpool ended the league season in second place, despite scoring 101 goals, the club's most since the 1895–96 season and the third-highest in Premier League history. Rodgers was the first Liverpool manager to win the LMA Manager of The Year Award. However, he was the first manager of the club since 1959 not to win a major trophy in his first three years at the helm, and on 4 October 2015, he was sacked.

=== 2015–present ===
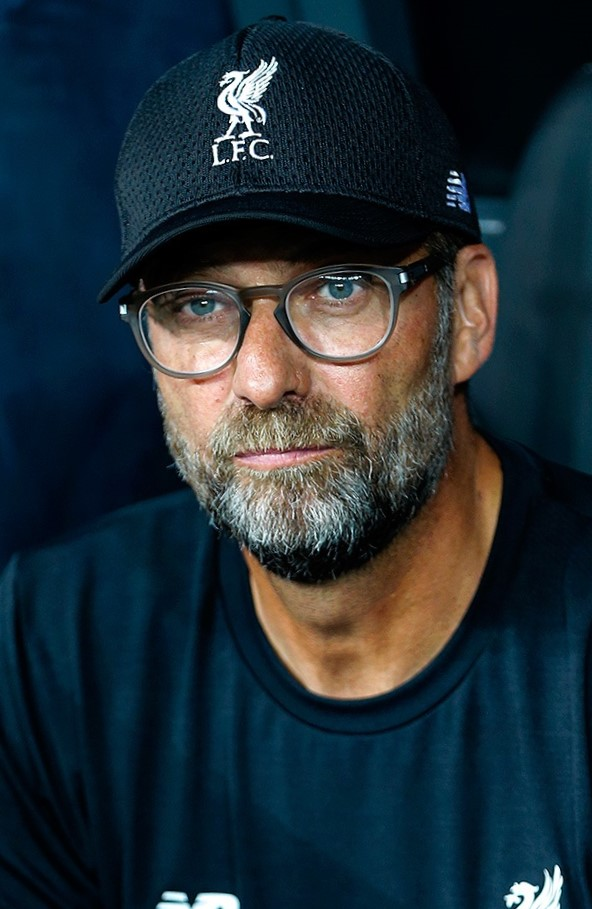
Jürgen Klopp was Liverpool's manager from 2015 until 2024.

On 8 October 2015, Brendan Rodgers was replaced by former Borussia Dortmund manager Jürgen Klopp. Klopp made an instant impact on the club and guided them to a League Cup Final and a surprise Europa League final in his first season at the club. During their Europa League campaign, he beat both English rivals Manchester United and his former club Borussia Dortmund en route to the final. However, they lost the League Cup Final to Manchester City via penalty shoot-out and they lost 1–3 to Spanish side Sevilla in the Europa League Final. They also finished 8th in the league, meaning they wouldn't qualify for European competition for the 2016–17 season. On 8 June 2016, Klopp and his coaching staff signed six-year contract extensions that ran until 2022. Klopp guided the club to a fourth-place finish in the 2016–17 season, qualifying them for the 2017–18 UEFA Champions League qualifying play-offs, where they beat German club, TSG 1899 Hoffenheim 6–3 on aggregate in a two-legged play-off to reach the group stage. Klopp led the team to finish top of their group and beat eventual English champions, Manchester City, and Italian club Roma in the knockout phase en route to the 2018 UEFA Champions League Final. Unfortunately for Liverpool, they lost 1–3 to Spanish giants Real Madrid.

During the 2018–19 season, Klopp guided Liverpool to their sixth Champions League triumph with a 2–0 win over fellow English club, Tottenham Hotspur, and also guided the club to a second-place finish in the league. At the start of the 2019–20 season, Klopp's Liverpool side played against Manchester City in the FA Community Shield and against Chelsea in the UEFA Super Cup. Both matches went into penalty shoot-outs, with Liverpool losing the former and winning the latter. Later in December, Klopp also guided Liverpool to their first ever FIFA club World Cup trophy, making it 3 trophies in 2019. In the 2019–20 season, Klopp secured Liverpool's first Premier League title and first top-flight title since 1990 by finishing on the most points in their history (99 points). The season was notable both for Liverpool's huge points lead over the rest of the league and for its interruption by the COVID-19 shutdown, meaning Liverpool won the Premier League at both the earliest (7 games to go) and the latest time ever (June). On 26 January 2024, the club released a statement, sharing Klopp's announcement that he would step down as Liverpool manager at the end of the current season (2023–24).

Arne Slot was announced as the head manager ahead of the 2024–25 season. Slot went on to guide Liverpool to the EFL Cup final where they lost out to Newcastle United before securing the Premier League title in April 2025 to equal Manchester United's record of 20 league title wins and also making Slot the first Dutch manager to win the Premier League and the fifth in history to win it in their debut season. Slot was sacked as Liverpool manager after almost two years in charge on 30 May 2026, following the conclusion of the disappointing 2025–26 season.

On 4 June 2026, Andoni Iraola was appointed head manager ahead of the 2026–27 season.

== Key ==
Key to record:

- Pld = Matches played
- W = Matches won
- D = Matches drawn
- L = Matches lost
- GF = Goals for / scored
- GA = Goals against / conceded
- Win % = Win ratio

Key to honours:

- L1 = Football League First Division/Premier League
- L2 = Football League Second Division/Lancashire League
- FA = FA Cup
- LC = Football League Cup
- CS = FA Community Shield
- EC = European Cup/UEFA Champions League
- UC = UEFA Cup
- US = UEFA Super Cup
- WC = Intercontinental Cup/FIFA Club World Cup

== Managers ==
Information correct as of 8 November 2026. Only competitive matches are counted.

Key
*	Caretaker manager

Liverpool F.C. managers
Manager	Nat.	From	To	Record							Honours										Ref.
Manager	Nat.	From	To	Pld	W	D	L	GF	GA	Win%	L1	L2	FA	LC	CS	EC	UC	US	WC	Total	Ref.
William Edward Barclay	IRE	15 March 1892	1 August 1895	91	52	17	22	221	118	57.14	0	1	0	0	0	0	0	0	0	1	
John McKenna	IRE	1 August 1895	27 July 1896	36	25	3	8	116	37	69.44	0	1	0	0	0	0	0	0	0	1	
Tom Watson	ENG	17 August 1896	6 May 1915	742	329	141	272	1,226	1,056	44.34	2	1	0	0	0	0	0	0	0	3	
George Patterson (Note: George Patterson served two terms as manager. His cumulative managerial statistics read as – Record (P384 W144 D87 L153 F688 A726 W%37.50) – Honours (L10 L20 FA0 LC0 CS0 EC0 UC0 US0 WC0 Total0).)	ENG	14 September 1918	17 December 1919	18	7	2	9	23	26	38.89	0	0	0	0	0	0	0	0	0	0	
David Ashworth	ENG	17 December 1919	12 February 1923	139	70	40	29	220	118	50.36	1	0	0	0	0	0	0	0	0	1	
Matt McQueen	SCO	13 February 1923	15 February 1928	229	93	60	76	354	307	40.61	1	0	0	0	0	0	0	0	0	1	
George Patterson	ENG	1 March 1928	6 August 1936	366	137	85	144	688	726	37.43	0	0	0	0	0	0	0	0	0	0	
George Kay	ENG	6 August 1936	30 January 1951	357	142	93	122	545	508	39.78	1	0	0	0	0	0	0	0	0	1	
Don Welsh	ENG	5 March 1951	4 May 1956	232	81	58	93	387	423	34.91	0	0	0	0	0	0	0	0	0	0	
Phil Taylor	ENG	14 May 1956	17 November 1959	150	76	32	42	294	211	50.67	0	0	0	0	0	0	0	0	0	0	
Bill Shankly	SCO	1 December 1959	12 July 1974	783	407	198	178	1,307	766	51.98	3	1	2	0	3	0	1	0	0	10	
Bob Paisley	ENG	26 August 1974	1 July 1983	535	308	131	96	955	406	57.57	6	0	0	3	6	3	1	1	0	20	
Joe Fagan	ENG	2 July 1983	29 May 1985	131	71	36	24	225	97	54.20	1	0	0	1	0	1	0	0	0	3	
Kenny Dalglish (Note: Kenny Dalglish served two terms as manager. His cumulative managerial statistics read as – Record (P381 W222 D95 L64 F847 A406 W%58.27) – Honours (L13 L20 FA2 LC1 CS4 EC0 UC0 US0 WC0 Total10).)	SCO	30 May 1985	21 February 1991	307	187	78	42	732	332	60.91	3	0	2	0	4	0	0	0	0	9	
Ronnie Moran^{*}	ENG	22 February 1991	15 April 1991	10	4	1	5	20	16	40.00	0	0	0	0	0	0	0	0	0	0	
Graeme Souness (Note: Souness underwent heart surgery in April 1992, and Ronnie Moran took charge of the team until the 1992 FA Cup Final.)	SCO	16 April 1991	28 January 1994	157	66	45	46	248	186	42.04	0	0	1	0	0	0	0	0	0	1	
Roy Evans	ENG	31 January 1994	12 November 1998	226	117	56	53	375	216	51.77	0	0	0	1	0	0	0	0	0	1	
Roy Evans Gérard Houllier	ENG; FRA	16 July 1998	12 November 1998	18	7	6	5	33	20	38.89	0	0	0	0	0	0	0	0	0	0	
Gérard Houllier (Note: Houllier was absent from October 2001 to February 2002, due to illness. During this time, Phil Thompson stepped in as temporary manager (P33 W16 D12 L5). These matches are included in Houllier's record.)	FRA	16 July 1998	24 May 2004	307	160	73	74	516	298	52.12	0	0	1	2	1	0	1	1	0	6	
Rafael Benítez	ESP	16 June 2004	3 June 2010	350	194	77	79	585	302	55.43	0	0	1	0	1	1	0	1	0	4	
Roy Hodgson	ENG	1 July 2010	8 January 2011	31	13	9	9	41	33	41.94	0	0	0	0	0	0	0	0	0	0	
Kenny Dalglish	SCO	8 January 2011	16 May 2012	74	35	17	22	115	74	47.30	0	0	0	1	0	0	0	0	0	1	
Brendan Rodgers	NIR	1 June 2012	4 October 2015	166	83	41	42	293	201	50.00	0	0	0	0	0	0	0	0	0	0	
Jürgen Klopp	GER	8 October 2015	31 May 2024	491	299	109	83	1,035	502	60.90	1	0	1	2	1	1	0	1	1	8	
Arne Slot	NED	1 June 2024	30 May 2026	113	66	19	28	219	129	58.41	1	0	0	0	0	0	0	0	0	1	
Andoni Iraola	ESP	4 June 2026	present	16	10	3	3	32	22	62.50	0	0	0	0	0	0	0	0	0	0	

== Bibliography ==
- Liversedge, Stan (1991). Liverpool:The Official Centenary History. Hamlyn Publishing Group Ltd. ISBN 0-600-57308-7.
- Pead, Brian (1986). Liverpool A Complete Record. Derby: Breedon Books Sport. ISBN 0-907969-15-1.
