= Haddow (surname) =

Haddow is a surname, of Scottish origin. Notable people with the surname include:

- Alex Haddow (born 1982), English footballer
- Alexander John Haddow (1912–1978), Scottish entomologist
- David Haddow (1869–?), Scottish footballer
- Donald Haddow (born 1970), Canadian swimmer
- George Haddow (1833–1919), Canadian politician
- James Haddow (1872–1943), Scottish footballer
- Johnny Haddow, Scottish footballer and manager
- Kris Haddow, Scottish writer
- Ross Haddow (1896–1973), businessman and politician from Glasgow
- William Martin Haddow (1865–1945), Scottish socialist
