= William McCann =

William McCann may refer to:

- William McCann (politician) (1879–1961), Australian politician
- Bill McCann (1892–1957), Australian soldier and barrister
- Billy McCann (1919–2002), American college basketball coach
- Sam McCann (William McCann, born 1969), American politician
- William McCann (footballer), Scottish footballer

== See also ==
- McCann (surname)
