= Frederick Spencer =

Frederick Spencer may refer to:

- Frederick Spencer, 4th Earl Spencer, British naval commander, courtier, and Whig politician
- Frederick Randolph Spencer, American portrait painter
- Fred Spencer (footballer), English footballer
- Freddie Spencer, American motorcycle racer

== See also ==
- Fred Spencer, American animator
