= James Cameron (footballer) =

Scottish footballer

Personal information
- Date of birth: 1868
- Date of death: 1934 (aged 65–66)
- Position: Defender

Senior career*
Years	Team	Apps	(Gls)
1894-1895	Liverpool	4	(0)
- Rangers
- Glasgow Perthshire
- Linthouse
- Pollokshields Athletic
- * Club domestic league appearances and goals

James Cameron (1868 – 1934) was a Scottish footballer who played as a defender. He made four appearances for Liverpool in the Football League First Division during the 1894–95 season. His clubs in Scotland included Rangers, Glasgow Perthshire, Linthouse and Pollokshields Athletic. At representative level, he played once for the Scottish Football Alliance XI against the rival Scottish Football League in 1892.
