= Ben Bull =

English footballer

Personal information
- Date of birth: May 1873
- Place of birth: Leicester, England
- Place of death: England
- Position: Midfielder

Senior career*
Years	Team	Apps	(Gls)
1896	Liverpool	1	(1)
- * Club domestic league appearances and goals

Ben Bull (born May 1873) was an English footballer who played as a midfielder. Bull made one appearance for Liverpool during his career, where he replaced regular winger Malcolm McVean for a match against Lincoln City and the second goal in a 6–1 victory. He made no further appearances for the club when McVean returned.
