= Willie Donnelly (footballer) =

Irish footballer (1872–1934)

Personal information
- Date of birth: 1872
- Place of birth: Magherafelt, Ireland
- Date of death: 1934 (aged 61–62)
- Place of death: Goalkeeper

Youth career
- St Mungo

Senior career*
Years	Team	Apps	(Gls)
- Vale of Clyde
1893–1895	Hibernian	21	(0)
1895–1896	Clyde	17	(0)
1896–1898	Liverpool	6	(0)
1898–1900	Clyde	20	(0)
1900–1901	Celtic	3	(0)
1901–1902	Belfast Celtic		
- * Club domestic league appearances and goals

William Donnelly (1872–1934) (Note: Some sources give Donnelly's death as August 1948, others as December 1934) was an Irish footballer who played as a goalkeeper for Vale of Clyde, Hibernian, Clyde, Celtic, Belfast Celtic and Liverpool during the 1890s and early 1900s.

Born in Magherafelt and raised in Scotland, he played for a number of Scottish teams and gained a reputation as an expert in stopping penalties before signing for Liverpool from Clyde in May 1896. He was the club's second-choice goalkeeper behind Harry Storer during the 1896–97 Football League season and had a run in the side after Storer was injured, becoming the second Irishman to play for Liverpool.

Returning to Clyde in 1898, Donnelly had joined Celtic by the 1900–01 Scottish Football League season and was a back-up option again, this time to Dan McArthur. He left Scotland for Belfast Celtic in mid-1901.
