= Harry Storer Sr. =

English cricketer and footballer (1870–1908)

Harry Storer
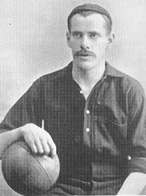

Personal information
- Born: 24 July 1870; Ripley, Derbyshire, England
- Died: 25 April 1908 (aged 37); Holloway, Derbyshire, England
- Batting: Right-handed
- Relatives: Bill Storer (brother); Harry Storer Jr. (son)

Domestic team information
- Years: Team
- 1895: Derbyshire
- FC debut: 19 June 1895 Derbyshire v Warwickshire
- Last FC: 11 July 1895 Derbyshire v Nottinghamshire

Career statistics
Competition	First-class
Matches	6
Runs scored	92
Batting average	10.22
100s/50s	0/0
Top score	35
Balls bowled	25
Wickets	0
Bowling average	–
5 wickets in innings	–
10 wickets in match	–
Best bowling	–
Catches/stumpings	3/–
- Source: CricketArchive, March 2012

Harry Storer (24 July 1870 – 25 April 1908) was an English football goalkeeper who played for Arsenal and Liverpool, and a cricketer who played first-class cricket for Derbyshire in 1895.

== Life and playing career ==
Storer was born at Ripley, Derbyshire, the son of John Storer, an engine smith, and his wife Elizabeth. In 1881 the family were living at Butterley Hill.

=== Football ===
Storer played for Ripley Town, Derby Midland, Derby County reserves, Gainsborough Trinity and Loughborough, before joining Woolwich Arsenal in May 1894. He made his debut against Lincoln City on 1 September 1894 and immediately became first choice goalkeeper. He only missed two matches of Arsenal's 1894–95 Second Division campaign, and was the first Arsenal player to win representative honours after he was selected for a Football League XI in 1895. He was first choice at the start of the next season as well, until he was suspended by the club for a disciplinary issue in November 1895. In all he played 41 league and cup matches for the London side.

Now unwanted by Arsenal, Storer was signed by Liverpool's manager John McKenna and William Barclay in December 1895. Storer made his debut on 1 January 1896 in a 3–1 win over Man City at Anfield. He kept the goalkeeping shirt for the remaining 11 games conceding just 8 goals as Liverpool regained their spot back in the top tier of English football. Storer then had a long run in the first team, missing just 7 of the Reds' 87 fixtures, he was eventually replaced by the versatile Matt McQueen for two matches and then William Perkins for the final five games of the 1898–99 season. Storer then became Perkins' understudy and apart from an 11 match spell in 1899 he never played for the club again although he didn't leave until 1901.

=== Cricket ===
Storer played six first-class matches for Derbyshire during the 1895 season. He was a right-handed batsman and played 10 innings in 6 first-class matches, with a top score of 35 and an average of 10.22. He bowled 25 balls without taking a first-class wicket.

== Death ==
Storer died at Holloway, Derbyshire at the age of 37, from tuberculosis.

Storer's brother William was also a footballer and cricketer, playing six Tests for England. His son Harry junior, who also played both football and cricket, became an England international and football manager.

== Career details ==
As a footballer

- Arsenal (1894–1895): 41 appearances, 0 goals
- Liverpool (1896–1901): 121 appearances, 0 goals – Football League Second Division winner's medal (1896)

As a cricketer

- Derbyshire (1895) – 6 matches

== See also ==
- List of English cricket and football players
