= Bill Keech =

English footballer (1872–1948)

Personal information
- Full name: William Keech
- Date of birth: 30 April 1872
- Place of birth: Irthlingborough, England
- Date of death: 6 September 1948 (aged 76)
- Place of death: Paddington, England
- Position(s): Centre forward; right half

Senior career*
Years	Team	Apps	(Gls)
1888	Irthlingborough Revellers		
1889	Irthlingborough		
- Finedon
- Kettering Hawks
1892	Wellingborough		
1893	Irthlingborough Wanderers		
- Kettering
1894–1895	Barnsley St. Peter's		
1895–1897	Liverpool	6	(0)
1897	Barnsley St. Peter's		
1897–1898	Blackpool	16	(0)
1898–1899	Leicester Fosse	15	(5)
1899	→ Loughborough (loan)	13	(6)
1899–1902	Queens Park Rangers	69	(6)
1902–1903	Brentford	19	(0)
	Small Heath	0	(0)
- Kensal Rise United
- * Club domestic league appearances and goals

William Keech (30 April 1872 – 6 September 1948) was an English professional footballer who played as a centre forward or right half in the Football League for Blackpool, Leicester Fosse, Loughborough and Liverpool. After his retirement he returned to one of his former clubs, Queens Park Rangers, as a trainer.

== Career statistics ==
Appearances and goals by club, season and competition
Club	Season	League			FA Cup		Other		Total	
Club	Season	Division	Apps	Goals	Apps	Goals	Apps	Goals	Apps	Goals
Liverpool	1895–96	Second Division	6	0	0	0	—		6	0
Leicester Fosse	1897–98	Second Division	9	3	—		—		9	3
Leicester Fosse	1898–99	Second Division	6	2	0	0	—		6	2
Leicester Fosse	Total		15	5	0	0	—		15	5
Queens Park Rangers	1899–00	Southern League First Division	24	2	10	3	—		34	5
Queens Park Rangers	1900–01	Southern League First Division	14	1	3	0	—		17	1
Queens Park Rangers	1901–02	Southern League First Division	17	0	3	0	—		20	0
Queens Park Rangers	Total		55	3	16	3	—		71	6
Brentford	1902–03	Southern League First Division	20	0	1	0	1 (Note: Appearance in Southern League promotion-relegation test match)	0	22	0
Career total			41	5	1	0	1	0	43	5
