= George Allan (footballer, born 1875) =

Scottish footballer (1875–1899)

Personal information
- Full name: George Horsburgh Allan
- Date of birth: 23 August 1875
- Place of birth: Linlithgow, Scotland
- Date of death: 17 October 1899 (aged 24)
- Place of death: Elie, Fife, Scotland
- Position: Forward

Youth career
- 1891–1893: Broxburn Shamrock

Senior career*
Years	Team	Apps	(Gls)
1893–1894	Bo'ness		
1894–1895	Leith Athletic		
1895–1897	Liverpool	49	(41)
1897–1898	Celtic	17	(15)
1898–1899	Liverpool	30	(8)

International career
1897	Scotland	1	(0)
- * Club domestic league appearances and goals

George Horsburgh Allan (23 August 1875 – 17 October 1899) was a Scottish footballer, who played as a forward for Liverpool, Celtic and Scotland in the late 19th century.

== Life and playing career ==
Born in Linlithgow, Allan played for Vale of Avon, Linlithgow Athletic, Broxburn Shamrock and Leith Athletic before being signed by Liverpool manager John McKenna and William Barclay in September 1895. The 20-year-old Allan made an impact for Liverpool after making his debut in a Football League Second Division match a 5–1 home thumping of Newcastle United on 14 September 1895, scoring his first goal for the club seven days later on 21 September against Loughborough Town at the Athletic Ground. This sparked an impressive goals per game run for the rest of the 1895–96 promotion season: he bagged 25 league goals from just 20 appearances, averaging 1.25 goals per games. Allan scored a further three goals in the promotion Test matches (the equivalent of today's play-offs) helping the Anfield club regain their spot in the top flight of English football.

Allan moved to Celtic in May 1897 where he carried on his goalscoring exploits, hitting 15 goals in 17 games to help the club win the Scottish league. He returned to Liverpool a year later when new manager Tom Watson re-signed him in April 1898. Allan scored 58 goals in only 96 appearances during his two spells at Anfield, an average of a goal every 1.65 games.

He made his only Scotland appearance on 3 April 1897, in a 2–1 victory against England at Crystal Palace; he was the first Liverpool player to appear for the country, whose governing body had excluded English-based players from squads until 1896.

Allan was a prolific goalscorer who could have gone on to be one of the all-time greats, but his life was cut short when he contracted tuberculosis in 1899 during his second spell at Liverpool; he was forced to give up playing and died of the condition on 17 October of that year.

== Career details ==
As a player:

- Liverpool FC (1895-1897 & 1898-1899): 96 appearances, 58 goals - Football League Second Division winner's medal (1896)
- Scotland (1897): 1 appearance
