= Bob Gray (footballer, born 1872) =

Scottish footballer

Personal information
- Date of birth: 27 February 1872
- Place of birth: Stirling, Scotland
- Date of death: 20 March 1926 (aged 54)
- Height: 5 ft 10 in (1.78 m)
- Position: Winger

Senior career*
Years	Team	Apps	(Gls)
1891–1894	King's Park		
1894–1895	Aston Villa	0	(0)
1895–1898	Grimsby Town	69	(25)
1898–1899	Bedminster		
1899–1900	Middlesbrough	2	(0)
1900–190?	Luton Town		
- * Club domestic league appearances and goals

Robert S. M. Gray (27 February 1872 – 20 March 1926) was a Scottish professional footballer who played as a winger.
