= William McCann (footballer) =

Scottish footballer

William McCann was a Scottish footballer who played as a goalkeeper. McCann was the first choice goalkeeper for Liverpool during the first half of the 1894–95 season. After conceding 11 goals in 3 games he was replaced as the keeper by Matt McQueen, he was restored to first choice keeper in a 4–0 win over West Bromwich Albion F.C. He made his last appearance for the club in February 1895 and left the club soon afterwards.
