= Willie Michael =

Scottish footballer (1874–1938)

Personal information
- Full name: William Michael
- Date of birth: 1874
- Place of birth: Wishaw, Scotland
- Date of death: 1938 (aged 63–64)
- Place of death: Scotland
- Positions: Centre forward; inside left

Youth career
- 1890–1893: Wishaw Thistle

Senior career*
Years	Team	Apps	(Gls)
1893–1896	Heart of Midlothian	44	(24)
1896–1897	Liverpool	19	(5)
1897–1900	Heart of Midlothian	41	(32)
1900–1901	Bristol City		
1901	Wishaw Thistle		
1901–02	Falkirk		
1902–03	Wishaw Thistle		
1903–1904	Motherwell	0	(0)

International career
1899	Scottish Football League XI	1	(0)
- * Club domestic league appearances and goals

William Michael was a Scottish professional footballer who played for Heart of Midlothian between 1893 and 1900, interspersed by a one-season spell with Liverpool.

Michael was the top scorer in the Scottish League Division One in the 1899–1900 season, scoring 15 goals. He played for the Scottish Football League XI once, in February 1899.
