= Jasper Reynolds =

English footballer

Personal information
- Full name: Charles Reynolds
- Date of birth: 1873
- Place of birth: Wolverhampton, England
- Position: Winger

Senior career*
Years	Team	Apps	(Gls)
1893–1894	Church Taverners		
1894–1895	Wolverhampton Wanderers	14	(5)
1895	Berwick Rangers (Worcester)		
1896	Banbury		
Total		14	(5)
- * Club domestic league appearances and goals

Charles Reynolds (1873 – after 1895) was an English footballer who played in the Football League for Wolverhampton Wanderers.
