= Neil Kerr =

Scottish footballer (1871–1901)

Personal information
- Full name: Neil Kerr
- Date of birth: 13 April 1871
- Place of birth: Bowling, Scotland
- Date of death: 2 December 1901 (aged 30)
- Place of death: Bowling, Scotland
- Height: 5 ft 8 in (1.73 m)
- Positions: Outside right; centre forward

Senior career*
Years	Team	Apps	(Gls)
1888–1890	Bowling		
1890	Cowlairs		
1890–1894	Rangers	58	(20)
1894–1895	Liverpool	12	(3)
1895–1896	Nottingham Forest	1	(0)
1896	Clyde	0	(0)
1896–1897	Falkirk		
1897–1898	Rangers	1	(0)
- * Club domestic league appearances and goals

Neil Kerr (13 April 1871 – 2 December 1901) was a Scottish footballer who played mainly as an outside right, for clubs including Rangers and Liverpool.

He played for both clubs in their first seasons in the respective top divisions, featuring in every fixture for Rangers plus the championship play-off as they shared the 1890–91 Scottish Football League title with Dumbarton. (Note: Some records also state that he played in the SFL for Dumbarton in that season, but scheduling makes this very unlikely. A player named of that name contracted to Cowlairs is recorded as featuring for a 'Glasgow North-Eastern' regional selection against Dumbartonshire (Neil Kerr's home region) in April 1890; this is possibly the source of confusion.) He also won the Glasgow Cup with the Light Blues in 1893. He later re-joined the Govan club after spells with Liverpool, Nottingham Forest and non-league Falkirk, but was only a reserve in his second spell and featured in just four competitive matches, albeit one of these was in the semi-final second replay of the 1897–98 Scottish Cup, helping Rangers reach the final which they went on to win.

At representative level, Kerr took part in a Scotland national team trial match in March 1892, and in November of that year was selected for the Glasgow FA's annual challenge match against Sheffield.

He was the sole survivor of a yachting accident on the Firth of Clyde in 1896 in which two other men drowned, but died from gastritis in 1901 at the age of 30.
