= Stephen F. Kelly =

British writer

Stephen F. Kelly is an English author and broadcaster, born in Liverpool, England in June 1946 and educated at Park High Grammar School for Boys Birkenhead. He is the author of many books, mostly on football and in particular on Liverpool Football Club. He has written a number of biographies of football managers including Bill Shankly, Sir Alex Ferguson, Kenny Dalglish and Gerard Houllier as well as an oral history of Liverpool Football Club. He was one of the first writers in Britain to explore sport through oral history, not only with The Kop but also with his oral history of Manchester United Football Club, Red Voices, and a further book on Liverpool, The Bootroom Boys. His other books include a novel, Mr Shankly's Photograph, which tells the story of a young boy growing up in Liverpool during the 1960s with a fascination for Liverpool Football Club, the Cavern and The Beatles. His study of life in Britain during the 1950s, You've Never Had It So Good, was published in April 2012. His most recent book, British Soldiers of the Korean War: In Their Own Words, is an oral history of the Korean War between 1950–53 and is published by the History Press. He was appointed Honorary Visiting professor at the University of Chester in 2012.

After leaving Park High School in Birkenhead he worked at the Cammell Laird shipyard for six years in Birkenhead as an apprentice draughtsman. He was heavily involved with the YMCA in Birkenhead and was a leading member of their drama group. This led to him acquiring an interest in drama. His trade union activities at Cammell Laird where he led an apprentices' strike honed an interest in left-wing politics. As a result, he was awarded the David Kitson scholarship from his union DATA to study at Ruskin College, Oxford. At Ruskin he studied with social historian Raphael Samuel and David Selbourne. After Ruskin he spent three years studying government at the London School of Economics, where he received a B.SC(econ) degree. He was then employed as a political journalist on Tribune before joining Granada Television in Manchester as a researcher. He later became a producer. His credits at Granada include World In Action, Union Power, Reports Politics, Hypotheticals and Union World. He worked closely with Gus Macdonald and Steve Morrison. He left Granada in 1988 to pursue a career as a writer. His first book, You'll Never Walk Alone, was published in 1987 and was a top ten bestseller. His biography of Bill Shankly was in the top ten bestseller charts for some weeks and was nominated for various prizes. In 1995 he was appointed Fellow in Media at the University of Huddersfield. In 2003, he set up Britain's first ever degree in sports journalism. He later set up and became Director of their Centre for Oral History Research. He also holds a PhD from Huddersfield. Has written for many newspapers and journals including The Guardian, The Times, The Independent, The Scotsman, Scotland On Sunday, Private Eye. Kelly is the author of more than 20 books on sport, politics and oral history. He is currently involved in an oral history of Granada Television (www.granadaland.org) where he has been involved in recording the memories of more than 100 former employees of the company. He has been a judge for the Royal Television Society and is a former Visiting Professor in History at Manchester Metropolitan University. He is currently Honorary Visiting Professor in Media at the University of Chester.

== Publications ==
- Forever Everton: Official Illustrated History of Everton F.C., Macdonalds (1987)
- You'll Never Walk Alone: Official Illustrated History of Liverpool Football Club, Macdonalds (1987)
- Back Page Football: A Century of Newspaper Coverage, Macdonalds (1988)
- Idle Hands, Clenched Fists: Depression in a Shipyard Town, Spokesman Books (1988)
- Back Page United, Macdonalds (1991)
- Boot Room Boys, Collins Willow (1991)
- Kelly, Stephen F. (1991). Victorian Lakeland Photographers. Shrewsbury: Swann Hill Press. ISBN 1853102334.
- A Game of Two Halves: Matches, the Teams, the Players, the Managers, the Fans, the Pain, the Poetry of Football (1992)
- Liverpool in Europe (1992)
- Graeme Souness: A Soccer Revolutionary (1994)
- The Highbury Encyclopedia: A-Z of Arsenal FC, Mainstream (1994)
- Back Page Football, Macdonalds (1995)
- Not Just a Game: Best Football Writing of the Season (1995)
- The Pick of the Season: Best of British Football Writing (1996)
- It's Much More Important Than That: Bill Shankly, the biography (1997)
- The Pick of the Season: Best of British Football Writing (1997)
- Fergie: Biography of Alex Ferguson, Headline, (1998)
- The Anfield Encyclopedia: An A-Z of Liverpool FC (1998)
- The Hamlyn Illustrated History of Liverpool, 1892-1998 (1998)
- Red Voices: United from the Terraces, Headline (1999)
- Forty Years of "Coronation Street", Macmillan (2000)
- The Old Trafford Encyclopedia: A-Z of Manchester United (2000)
- Mr. Shankly's Photograph, Robson Books (2002)
- Gerard Houllier: The Liverpool Revolution, Virgin Books (2003)
- Dalglish, Headline (2004)
- The Kop, Virgin Books (2005)
- You've Never Had It So Good: Recollections of Life in the 1950s, The History Press (2012)
- British Soldiers of the Korean War: In Their Own Words, The History Press (2013)
- How The Beatles Rocked the World, Pen and Sword Books (2024)
