= Ben Garfield =

English footballer

Personal information
- Full name: Benjamin Garfield
- Date of birth: 4 April 1871
- Place of birth: Higham Ferrers, England
- Date of death: April–June 1958 (aged 87)
- Place of death: Manchester, England
- Height: 5 ft 7 in (1.70 m)
- Position: Outside left

Senior career*
Years	Team	Apps	(Gls)
- Finedon
- Kettering Town
1894–1895	Burton Wanderers	59	(27)
1896–1901	West Bromwich Albion	109	(34)
1901–1905	Brighton & Hove Albion	38	(13)
1905–1906	Tunbridge Wells Rangers		

International career
1898	England	1	(0)
- * Club domestic league appearances and goals

Benjamin Garfield (4 April 1871 – mid-1958) was an English footballer who played at outside left. Garfield played for Finedon, Kettering Town, Burton Wanderers, West Bromwich Albion, Brighton & Hove Albion, Tunbridge Wells Rangers and England.

== Biography ==
Garfield was born in Higham Ferrers, Northamptonshire. In 1898 he won his only England cap, appearing in a 3–2 victory over Ireland in Belfast.
