= Charlie Henderson =

English footballer

Personal information
- Full name: Charles Joe Henderson
- Date of birth: April 1870
- Place of birth: Durham, County Durham, England
- Position: Inside forward

Senior career*
Years	Team	Apps	(Gls)
1890–1891	Darlington		
1891–1892	South Bank		
1892–1893	Grimsby Town	12	(0)
1893–1894	Leith Athletic		
1894–1895	Bolton Wanderers	28	(14)
1895–1896	Wolverhampton Wanderers	30	(9)
1896–1897	Sheffield United	14	(4)
1897–1898	New Brighton Tower		
1898–1899	South Bank		
1899–1900	Dundee Harp		
1900–190?	Edinburgh Thistle		
- * Club domestic league appearances and goals

Charles Joe Henderson (born April 1870, date of death unknown) was an English professional footballer who played as an inside forward.
