= Hugh Henderson =

Scottish footballer

Personal information
- Position: Forward

Senior career*
Years	Team	Apps	(Gls)
1893–1894	Third Lanark	14	(3)
1894–1895	Liverpool	2	(0)
1895	Partick Thistle	3	(0)
- * Club domestic league appearances and goals

Hugh Henderson was a Scottish footballer who played as a forward. He played for Liverpool during their first season in The Football League in the 1894–95 season.

Having joined after a spell with Third Lanark, he only made two appearances for Liverpool which were in defeats against Aston Villa and Burnley. Before the end of the season he was released from his contract and returned to Scotland, making three appearances for Partick Thistle – again these were heavy losses in which his team failed to score.
