= Albert Carnelly =

English footballer

Personal information
- Date of birth: 29 December 1870
- Place of birth: Nottingham, England
- Date of death: 18 August 1920 (aged 49)
- Place of death: Nottingham, England
- Position: Inside forward

Youth career
- 189?–1890: Notts County

Senior career*
Years	Team	Apps	(Gls)
1890–1894	Loughborough	58	(44)
1894–1896	Nottingham Forest	52	(24)
1896–1897	Leicester Fosse	28	(10)
1897–1898	Bristol City	20	(17)
1898	Ilkeston Town	-	(-)
1898–1899	Bristol City	15	(10)
1899–1900	Thames Ironworks	27	(9)
1900–1901	Millwall Athletic	13	(2)
1901-	Ilkeston Town	-	(-)
- * Club domestic league appearances and goals

Albert Carnelly (29 December 1870 – 18 August 1920) was an English footballer who played as an inside forward. He made over 200 appearances scoring 116 goals in first team league football. Carnelly made 80 Football League appearances scoring 34 goals, 58 Midland League appearances scoring 44 goals and 75 Southern League appearances scoring 38 goals in the years 1890 to 1901 before the First World War.

== Career ==
Albert Carnelly played locally for Notts County before turning professional with Loughborough in December 1890. Carnelly joined Nottingham Forest in May 1894 playing two seasons in Division One before dropping into Division Two in May 1896 for a season with Leicester Fosse. Next Carnelly moved south in July 1897 to play in the Southern League with Bristol City for two years. In summer 1899 Carnelly signed for Thames Ironworks staying one season and spent a further season in the Southern League with Millwall Athletic.

Carnelly returned to Nottingham in 1901 and after regaining amateur status in 1903 finished his playing career with Nottingham Corporation Tramways.

== Honours ==
with Bristol City

- Southern Football League runners-up: 1897–98
- Southern Football League runners-up: 1898–99
