= David Smith (footballer, born 1871) =

Scottish footballer

Personal information
- Full name: David Smith
- Date of birth: 1871
- Place of birth: Kilwinning, Scotland
- Position: Centre forward

Senior career*
Years	Team	Apps	(Gls)
1890–1891	Kilmarnock Athletic		
1891–1892	Rossendale		
1892–1893	Kilmarnock Athletic		
1893–1896	Preston North End	33	(14)
Total		33	(14)
- * Club domestic league appearances and goals

David Smith (1871–unknown) was a Scottish footballer who played in the Football League for Preston North End.
