= Andrew Hamilton (footballer, born 1873) =

Scottish footballer

Personal information
- Date of birth: 18 December 1873
- Place of birth: Falkirk, Scotland
- Date of death: 20 March 1939 (aged 65)
- Place of death: Wallasey, England
- Height: 5 ft 10 in (1.78 m)
- Position: Winger

Senior career*
Years	Team	Apps	(Gls)
1894–1895	Cambuslang		
1895–1896	Falkirk		
1896–1897	Sunderland	7	(2)
1897–1898	New Brighton Tower		
1898–1899	Warmley		
1899–1900	Ryde		
1900–190?	Watford	6	(1)
- * Club domestic league appearances and goals

Andrew Hamilton (18 December 1873– 20 March 1939) was a Scottish professional footballer who played as a winger for Sunderland.
