= David Nicoll (footballer) =

Scottish footballer

Personal information
- Full name: David Nicoll
- Place of birth: Arbroath, Scotland
- Position: Inside forward

Senior career*
Years	Team	Apps	(Gls)
1891–1892	Western (Arbroath)		
1892–1893	Victoria (Arbroath)		
1893–1894	Wanderers (Arbroath)		
1894–1895	Arbroath		
1895–1899	Bolton Wanderers	59	(11)
1899–1900	Millwall Athletic		
1900–1901	Bristol City		
1901–1902	Bolton Wanderers	2	(0)
1902	Arbroath		
Total		61	(11)
- * Club domestic league appearances and goals

David Nicoll was a Scottish footballer who played in the Football League for Bolton Wanderers.
