= Joe McQue =

Scottish footballer (1873–1914)

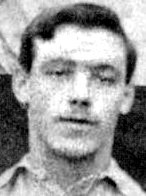

Personal information
- Full name: Joseph Patrick McQue
- Date of birth: 11 March 1873
- Place of birth: Springburn, Scotland
- Date of death: 11 June 1914 (aged 41)
- Place of death: Glasgow, Scotland
- Position: Centre half

Senior career*
Years	Team	Apps	(Gls)
- Campsie Black Watch
- Campsie
	Celtic	0	(0)
1892–1898	Liverpool	103	(10)
- Falkirk
- * Club domestic league appearances and goals

Joseph Patrick McQue (also spelled McCue, 11 March 1873 – 11 June 1914) was a Scottish footballer who played for Liverpool in the late 19th century.

== Life and playing career ==
Raised in the Lennoxtown area, McQue began his career with local clubs, winning the Stirlingshire Cup in 1892 with Campsie. After a short period in the reserves at Celtic, he was signed for newly-formed Liverpool by manager John McKenna and his partner William Barclay in the summer of 1892. McQue was a defender with an attacking mindset. He played in Liverpool's first ever competitive game, an 8–0 victory against Higher Walton, on 3 September 1892 in the Lancashire League, which Liverpool went on to win convincingly. McQue also played in the club's first Football League fixture, scoring the second in a 2–0 away win at Middlesbrough Ironopolis. The following season, he was a key defender in the Liverpool team that were undefeated in their 28 league matches and won the Football League Second Division; he was then in the side that won the promotion test match against Newton Heath, later to become Man Utd.

McQue experienced relegation from the top flight during the 1894–95 season, but was part of the side that bounced back, again as Second Division champions at the end of the 1895–96 term, scoring 5 times in 26 games. He was awarded a benefit match in April 1896.

McQue went on to appear 146 times for Liverpool, scoring 14 goals from the back line, before leaving in 1898 (his replacement Alex Raisbeck, another Scot, would become one of the stars of the era). He returned to central Scotland, playing for Falkirk (who were not Scottish Football League members at the time). He lived in Denny but died in a Glasgow hospital in 1914.

== Honours ==
- Football League Second Division: 1893–94, 1895–96
- Lancashire League: 1892–93
