= James Haddow =

Scottish footballer

Personal information
- Full name: James Haddow
- Date of birth: 1872
- Place of birth: Kilmarnock, Scotland
- Date of death: 1943 (aged 70–71)
- Position: Half back

Senior career*
Years	Team	Apps	(Gls)
1891–1896	Darwen	43	(4)
- * Club domestic league appearances and goals

James Haddow (1872–1943) was a Scottish footballer who played in the Football League for Darwen.
