= Harry Davis (footballer, born 1873) =

English footballer (1873–1938)

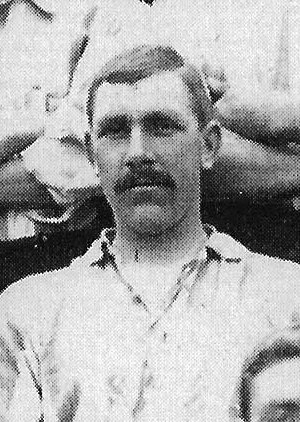

Personal information
- Full name: Henry Davis
- Date of birth: November 1873
- Place of birth: Smethwick, England
- Date of death: 1938 (aged 64–65)
- Position: Inside forward

Senior career*
Years	Team	Apps	(Gls)
1888–1889	Summer Hall		
1889–1892	Birmingham St George's		
1892–1899	The Wednesday	160	(35)
Total		160	(35)

International career
1891	Football Alliance XI	1	(1)
- * Club domestic league appearances and goals

Henry Davis (November 1873 – 1938) was an English footballer who played in the Football League for The Wednesday. He played in the 1896 FA Cup Final victory against Wolverhampton Wanderers.

== See also ==
- List of Sheffield Wednesday F.C. players
