= Thomas Cleghorn =

Scottish footballer (1871–?)

Personal information
- Full name: Thomas Cleghorn
- Date of birth: 13 February 1870
- Place of birth: Leith, Scotland
- Height: 5 ft 5 in (1.65 m)
- Position: Half back

Senior career*
Years	Team	Apps	(Gls)
- Leith Athletic
1894–1896	Blackburn Rovers	45	(3)
1896–1899	Liverpool	56	(0)
1899–1903	Portsmouth		
1903–1906	Plymouth Argyle	5	(0)
- * Club domestic league appearances and goals

Thomas Cleghorn (born 13 Febrruary 1870) was a Scottish footballer who played as a half back. He made 101 appearances in the Football League for Blackburn Rovers and Liverpool, in which he scored three goals. Having begun his career with Scottish Football League club Leith Athletic, he also went on to play in the Southern and Western Leagues for Portsmouth and Plymouth Argyle.

Born in the Scottish burgh of Leith, Cleghorn began his playing career with his local club, Leith Athletic. As a half back he played primarily on the left side of the pitch. He joined Blackburn Rovers in 1894 and made 45 appearances in the Football League over the next two seasons, in which he scored three goals. A club historian described Cleghorn as "a great little player who never knew when he was beaten. He worked like a demon, tackled effectively and headed the ball with wonderful skill." He moved to Liverpool in 1896 and became a first-team regular over the next four seasons. Cleghorn left Liverpool in 1899 having made 56 league appearances and 14 more in cup competitions, scoring once.

Cleghorn's next club was Portsmouth, where he won the Southern and Western League titles in 1901. Portsmouth's manager at the time was Frank Brettell and in 1903, when Brettell became the manager of Plymouth Argyle, he recommended Cleghorn for the position of team trainer to the club's board of directors. Cleghorn continued to play for the next three seasons as a reserve half-back, in addition to his coaching duties, and made five league appearances. He was a "clever and conscientious" coach who was "well-esteemed by all."
