= Bobby Neill (footballer) =

Scottish footballer (1875–1913)

Personal information
- Full name: Robert Scott Gibson Neill
- Date of birth: 24 September 1875
- Place of birth: Calton, Scotland
- Date of death: 2 March 1913 (aged 37)
- Place of death: Govan, Scotland
- Positions: Centre half; wing half

Senior career*
| Years | Team | Apps | (Gls) |
| – | Ashfield | | |
| 1893–1894 | Northern | | |
| 1894–1896 | Hibernian | 31 | (10) |
| 1895 | → Liverpool (loan) | 0 | (0) |
| 1896–1897 | Liverpool | 22 | (2) |
| 1897–1904 | Rangers | 92 | (24) |

International career
| 1896–1900 | Scotland | 2 | (2) |
| 1901 | Scottish League XI | 1 | (0) |
- * Club domestic league appearances and goals

Robert Scott Gibson Neill (24 September 1875 – 2 March 1913) was a Scottish footballer who played for Hibernian, Liverpool, Rangers and Scotland. He played at centre half and at wing half.

== Career ==
Neill started his career in north Glasgow with Juniors Ashfield and seniors Northern, then moved on to Hibernian. He played in the 1896 Scottish Cup Final, which Hibs lost 3–1 against Heart of Midlothian.

After a one-year spell with Liverpool, Neill joined Rangers in 1897. During his seven seasons there he amassed four Scottish League championships, one Scottish Cup (1898), three Glasgow Cups (1897–98, 1899–1900 and 1901–02) and two Charity Cups (1896–97 and 1899–1900). He made 109 first class appearances for Rangers and scored 28 goals, and was part of the club's 'perfect season' in the 1898–99 Scottish Division One where they won all 18 fixtures, featuring in all of those matches.

Neill gained two Scotland caps during his career, both coming against Wales. He scored two goals on his debut, a 4–0 win for Scotland on 21 March 1896. His second cap, which ended in a 5–2 win for Scotland, was on 3 February 1900.

After retirement he became a restaurateur, but died in March 1913 aged thirty-seven.
