= John Holmes (footballer) =

English footballer

James Holmes (born 1869) was an English footballer who played as a defender for Liverpool and New Brighton in The Football League. Holmes signed for Liverpool from Preston North End in the 1895–96 season. He made 19 appearances that season as Liverpool won the Second Division. He played in fewer games in the following seasons and was eventually released in 1898.

He was the brother of Bob Holmes, the Preston North End player.
