= Fred Spencer (footballer) =

English footballer

Personal information
- Full name: Frederick Spencer
- Date of birth: 1871
- Place of birth: Basford, Nottingham, England
- Date of death: 1959 (aged 87–88)
- Position: Winger

Senior career*
Years	Team	Apps	(Gls)
1895–1900	Nottingham Forest	43	(19)
1900–1902	Notts County	15	(2)
1903	St Andrew's (Nottingham)		
Total		58	(21)
- * Club domestic league appearances and goals

Frederick Spencer (1871–1959) was an English footballer who played in the Football League for Nottingham Forest and Notts County.
