= Tom Wilkie =

Scottish footballer (1876–1932)

Personal information
- Full name: Thomas Wilkie
- Date of birth: 1876
- Place of birth: Edinburgh, Scotland
- Date of death: 8 January 1932 (aged 55–56)
- Place of death: Perth, Australia
- Height: 5 ft 11 in (1.80 m)
- Position: Defender

Senior career*
| Years | Team | Apps | (Gls) |
| 1893–1895 | Heart of Midlothian | 4 | (0) |
| 1895–1899 | Liverpool | 57 | (1) |
| 1899–1904 | Portsmouth | 104 | (0) |
| Total | | 165 | (1) |
- * Club domestic league appearances and goals

Thomas Wilkie (1876 – 8 January 1932) was a Scottish footballer who played as a defender for Liverpool in The Football League. Wilkie signed for Liverpool from Heart of Midlothian during the 1895–96 season, appearing in 20 of the 30 league matches. He established himself as the first choice left-back the following campaign, appearing in 25 consecutive matches; however, he played less frequently in the subsequent seasons and in 1899 he was sold to newly formed Portsmouth, for whom he made 178 appearances in all competitions (104 in the Southern League) during his five years at the Hampshire club. He later emigrated to Australia.
