= John McCartney (footballer, born 1870) =

Scottish footballer

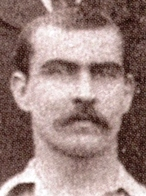
- John McCartney in 1896.

Personal information
- Date of birth: 1870
- Place of birth: Scotland
- Date of death: c. 1942 (aged 71–72)

John McCartney (1870 – c. 1942) was a Scottish footballer who played at half-back for Liverpool. He was born in Darvel, Ayrshire, Scotland.

== Life and playing career ==
John McCartney played for Newmilns, St Mirren and New Brighton Tower. McCartney was signed by John McKenna for the Reds in 1892, 1 of the 13 Scottish footballers that Liverpool brought in at the beginning of the club's history.

McCartney went on to make 167 appearances for Liverpool scoring 6 times. He also helped them win the Second Division championship in both the 1893–94 and 1895–96 seasons.

He played in 16 of the 28 games during Liverpool's promotion winning side of 1893/94, he scored once that season in a 5-0 drubbing of Woolwich Arsenal, later to become Arsenal.

McCartney had to miss most of the promotion winning 1895/96 season but returned just in time to make a difference in the 4 promotion gaining test matches. He played 2 more seasons at Anfield missing just 3 matches, he left the club in 1898.
