= Frank Becton =

English footballer (1873–1909)

Personal information
- Full name: Francis Becton
- Date of birth: 11 May 1873
- Place of birth: Preston, England
- Date of death: 6 November 1909 (aged 36)
- Place of death: Preston, England
- Position: Inside forward

Youth career
- 1889–1891: Fishwick Rambles

Senior career*
Years	Team	Apps	(Gls)
1891–1895	Preston North End	87	(37)
1895–1898	Liverpool	70	(38)
1898–1899	Sheffield United	11	(3)
1899–1900	Bedminster		
1900–1901	Preston North End	26	(9)
1901–1903	Swindon Town	41	(9)
1903	Nelson		
1903–1904	Ashton Town		
1904	New Brighton Tower		

International career
1895–1897	England	2	(2)
- * Club domestic league appearances and goals

Francis (Frank) Becton (11 May 1873 – 6 November 1909) was an English professional footballer at the turn of the 20th century. An inside forward, he turned out for Preston North End (in two separate spells), Liverpool, Sheffield United, Bedminster, Swindon Town, Ashton Town and New Brighton Tower. He also represented England twice, scoring two goals.

His early death came from tuberculosis.
