= Malcolm McVean =

Scottish footballer (1871–1907)

Personal information
- Date of birth: 7 March 1871
- Place of birth: Jamestown, Scotland
- Date of death: 6 June 1907 (aged 36)
- Place of death: Bonhill, Scotland
- Position: Winger

Youth career
- Vale Wanderers

Senior career*
Years	Team	Apps	(Gls)
1890–1891	Vale of Leven	4	(0)
1891–1892	Third Lanark	20	(6)
1892–1897	Liverpool	89	(24)
1897	Burnley	4	(0)
1897–1898	Dundee	16	(7)
1898–1899	Bedminster		
1899–1900	Clydebank		
1900–1901	Renton		
- * Club domestic league appearances and goals

Malcolm McVean (7 March 1871 – 6 June 1907) was a Scottish footballer who played as a winger. He is notable for having scored Liverpool's first ever goal, in a friendly against Rotherham Town on 1 September 1892, which Liverpool won 7–1.

He started his career with Third Lanark before he was signed by newly formed Liverpool in 1892. As well as scoring their first ever goal, McVean was also Liverpool's captain for their first ever competitive match, in the Lancashire League against Higher Walton on 3 September 1892. Walton did not arrive until forty-five minutes after the scheduled kick-off time, and Liverpool won 8–0.

When Liverpool were admitted to the Football League a year later, it was McVean who scored their first ever goal in the League, in a 2–0 win away from home over Middlesbrough Ironopolis on 2 September 1893. He also scored twice in Liverpool's first ever victory over top flight opposition when Preston North End were beaten 3–2 in a classic FA cup upset in 1894.

In all McVean made 89 league appearances for the Reds, forty-three of them in the top division where he scored eight goals in four seasons from 1893 until 1897 when he spent the end of his fourth, and final league season with Burnley where he made just four appearances.

McVean has the unusual distinction of having experienced promotion or relegation in each of his four seasons in England; Liverpool 1894 – promoted, 1895 – relegated, 1896 – promoted, Burnley, 1897 – relegated.

He left English league football for his native Scotland where he joined Dundee. He also had spells with Bedminster and Clydebank.
