= William Edward Barclay =

Irish football manager (1857–1917)

William Barclay
Personal information
- Full name: William Edward Barclay
- Date of birth: 14 June 1857
- Place of birth: Dublin, Ireland
- Date of death: 30 January 1917 (aged 59)
- Place of death: Liverpool, England

Managerial career
- Years: Team
- 1888–1889: Everton
- 1892–1895: Liverpool

William Edward Barclay (14 June 1857 – 30 January 1917) was the first manager of Everton and also the first manager of Liverpool, working with club secretary John McKenna.

His time at Everton was short managing them for their first 22 games. When the majority of the Everton set-up left Anfield in order to move to the purpose-built Goodison Park, Barclay was one of the people who stayed to form a new club which eventually became Liverpool F.C.

While he was in charge of the side that won the Second Division championship in 1893–94, Liverpool got relegated from the First Division the following season (with Liverpool losing a test match to Bury 1–0). However, in his last season as Liverpool manager, Barclay led the side to the Second Division championship in 1895–96.

Barclay also served two spells as Liverpool chairman and worked for the Football Association.

Barclay remained the only person to have managed both Liverpool and Everton until the appointment of Rafael Benítez as Everton manager in 2021.
