= John McKenna =

Irish football manager, businessman and rugby player (1855–1936)

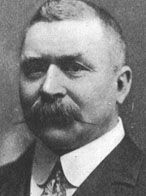

Personal information
- Date of birth: 3 January 1855
- Place of birth: County Monaghan, Ireland
- Date of death: 22 March 1936 (aged 81)
- Place of death: Walton, Liverpool, England

Managerial career
- Years: Team
- 1895–1896: Liverpool

John McKenna (Irish: Seán Mac Cionnaoith; 3 January 1855 – 22 March 1936) was an Irish football manager, businessman and professional rugby player.

He was the second manager of Liverpool F.C. which has since gone on to become one of the most successful football clubs in England.

== Early life and career ==
McKenna was born on 3 January 1855 in Glaslough, a village in the north-east corner of County Monaghan in Ireland. He was the son of Patrick McKenna and Jane McCrudden. In the 1870s he moved to Liverpool seeking work which he soon found at a grocery store, and later as a vaccination officer for the West Derby Union. McKenna had a keen interest in sports, particularly rugby, as well as football and shooting sports. He helped form a regimental rugby club and joined the West Lancashire County Rugby Football Union.

== Liverpool F.C. ==
In the late 1880s, McKenna met the founder of Liverpool Football Club John Houlding, who invited him to Anfield to watch his Everton team play. He remained with Houlding after Everton left Anfield for Goodison Park. Houlding was a major driving force for Liverpool throughout the early years, and he used his connections to look for players in Glasgow. His team was known as the "Team of Macs" due to the number of players with "Mc" in their surname, which included: Duncan McLean, James McBride, Malcolm McVean, Hugh McQueen, Matt McQueen, John McCartney and Joe McQue.

Acting as the club's secretary, McKenna telegraphed the Football League asking for Liverpool to be admitted, but was denied entry by the Football Association. This refusal forced McKenna to guide Liverpool through the ranks of the Lancashire League on his own. Liverpool played their first game with an 8–0 win at Anfield against Higher Walton, with John Smith scoring the first competitive goal. After ending their first competitive season as champions, Liverpool were elected into the Football League, and played their first Football League match away to Middlesbrough Ironopolis on 2 September 1893, and won 2–0.

McKenna served as Liverpool's chairman from 1906 to 1915. He was elected president of the Football League in 1917, a position he held for nearly 20 years until his death in March 1936. He had served Liverpool for over 40 years. Like Houlding, McKenna was an active freemason, attending Cecil Lodge No. 3274.

== Death and legacy ==
His coffin was carried through the city by three Liverpool players and three Everton players. A plaque in commemoration to him remains in the foyer in Anfield. In August 2011, a commemorative plaque in honour of Liverpool F.C.'s first manager John McKenna was unveiled in Glaslough in County Monaghan, Ireland, which was viewed by former Liverpool and Republic of Ireland player Ray Houghton. Over 200 people attended an informative talk on McKenna by Keith Falkiner, author of the book Emerald Anfield, in the local community hall before the plaque was unveiled by Kopite and LFC Donegal secretary David Moen.

At the conclusion of his talk, Falkiner summed up the achievements of McKenna, saying:

"The course of history has proven John McKenna to be one of the most powerful and successful men at Liverpool Football Club – the third most important figure, in my opinion, after only Bill Shankly and the club's founder John Houlding. The people of Monaghan should be proud of this history and proud of 'Honest' John McKenna – who is arguably the greatest Irishman who has ever been involved with the game of association football in Britain."

== Other Historical Information ==
John McKenna, during his position as Football League President, formally opened the current 'South Stand' at Portsmouth FC's Fratton Park stadium in 1925. The stand was designed by renowned architect, Archibald Leitch. A plaque in the 'South Stand' still marks the occasion.
