= 1920–21 Burnley F.C. season =

English football club season

Burnley F.C.
1920–21 season
- Chairman: Harry Windle
- Manager: John Haworth
- Football League First Division: Champions
- FA Cup: Third round
- Charity Shield: Runners-up
- Top goalscorer: League: Joe Anderson (25); All: Joe Anderson (33)
- Highest home attendance: 42,653 vs Bolton Wanderers (26 Feb 1921)
- Lowest home attendance: 22,000 vs Sunderland (7 May 1921)
- Average home league attendance: 31,535
Home colours

The 1920–21 season was Burnley's 29th season in the Football League, and their 4th consecutive campaign in the Football League First Division, the top tier of English football. Burnley were confident of success ahead of the season, having finished as First Division runners-up in 1919–20. After losing their first three games, Burnley embarked on a 30-match unbeaten league run from 4 September 1920 until 26 March 1921, winning the First Division and becoming English champions for the first time in their history. Burnley's unbeaten run stood as a single-season Football League record for over 80 years, until it was bettered by Arsenal in the 2003–04 season. Burnley ended the 1920–21 season on 59 points, having won 23 games, drawn 13, and lost 6.

The team reached the third round of the FA Cup, defeating Leicester City away and Queens Park Rangers at home, before unexpectedly losing away to Second Division side Hull City. Burnley won the East Lancashire Charity Cup, beating Blackburn Rovers 8–2 over two legs, but were eliminated from the Lancashire Senior Cup at the semi-final stage by Manchester City. As league champions, Burnley qualified for the Charity Shield, in which they were beaten 2–0 by FA Cup winners Tottenham Hotspur. Burnley also played two friendly matches during the season. The first, against Blackburn Rovers, marked the opening of Accrington Stanley's new stadium; the other was a benefit match for Patsy Gallacher, against a representative team from the Scottish Football League.

Burnley used 23 players during the season and had nine goalscorers. Their top scorer was Scottish forward Joe Anderson, with 31 competitive goals, including 25 in the league. Eight new players were signed by Burnley during the season, and eleven were released or transferred. Match attendances were the highest they had been at the club's home ground, Turf Moor, with an average gate of over 30,000. The highest attendance of the campaign was 42,653, who saw Burnley beat Bolton Wanderers 3–1 on 26 February 1921; the lowest was 22,000, for the match against Sunderland on the final day of the season.

== Background and pre-season ==
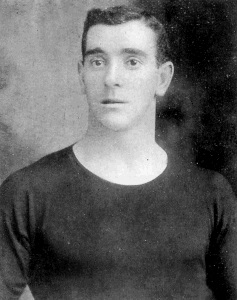
Club captain Tommy Boyle was confident of a successful season.

The 1920–21 campaign was the second season of competitive football in England after the First World War. It was Burnley's 29th season in the Football League, and their 4th consecutive season in the Football League First Division, since promotion from the Football League Second Division in 1912–13. Burnley's chairman, Harry Windle, had been elected to the position in 1909, and manager John Haworth was marking his 11th consecutive year in charge. After finishing as runners-up to West Bromwich Albion in the First Division the previous season, there was a sense of eager anticipation within the club before the season began. Team captain Tommy Boyle claimed that his side was capable of building on its success of the previous season and winning the league championship, despite Burnley not having won a trophy since their FA Cup victory in 1914.

Burnley's only pre-season friendly games were two intramural practice matches, between the first team and the reserves, the second of which was watched by a crowd of around 10,000 at the club's home ground, Turf Moor. The team's last competitive match had ended in a 2–0 defeat against Manchester United in the Lancashire Senior Cup on 8 May 1920, almost four months earlier. The strip for 1920–21 was very little changed from that of the previous season; the claret jersey with light blue sleeves and a light blue stripe around the collar was kept along with the white shorts, but the claret socks were replaced by black. Minor works were carried out on the Turf Moor stadium, with improvements to the pavilion, club offices and referee's changing room.

== Transfers ==
The nucleus of the Burnley team remained unchanged from the previous campaign. Eight new players signed for the club, and eleven left during the season. New signings included goalkeeper Frank Birchenough from West Ham United and full-back Bob McGrory from Dumbarton. Also brought in were George Richardson from non-League side Horden Athletic and Tom Brophy from St Helens Town. Attackers Richard Cragg, Billy Clarkson and Patrick Norris were among those who left the club in pre-season.

Transfer activity continued after the season began. Full back Tom Bamford, who had not played a match for Burnley since before the First World War thanks to the emergence of Len Smelt, left the club and joined Rochdale in September 1920. West Bromwich Albion's Len Moorwood was signed in October 1920 to provide further goalkeeping backup. Inside forward Jack Lane was brought in from Cradley Heath in December 1920, followed by full back John Pearson from the same club two months later. Winger George Douglas was signed from Leicester City in February 1921. Thomas Jackson, who had made only one first-team appearance for Burnley, left the club in January 1921 to sign for Scottish side Dundee. Two players who had been signed at the beginning of the season left Burnley in April 1921; McGrory moved to Stoke City on a free transfer and Birchenough was released after playing two league matches. Bert Freeman left Burnley at the end of the season after nine years service, by which time he had become the club's all-time leading goalscorer.

In
| Player | Pos | From | Date |
|---|---|---|---|
| Frank Birchenough | GK | West Ham United | August 1920 |
| Bob McGrory | FB | Dumbarton | August 1920 |
| George Richardson | FB | Horden Athletic | August 1920 |
| Tom Brophy | FB | St Helens Town | September 1920 |
| Len Moorwood | GK | West Bromwich Albion | October 1920 |
| Jack Lane | FW | Cradley Heath | December 1920 |
| George Douglas | HB | Leicester City | February 1921 |
| John Pearson | FB | Cradley Heath | February 1921 |

FB = Full back, FW = Forward, GK = Goalkeeper, HB = Half back

Out
| Player | Pos | To | Date |
|---|---|---|---|
| James Twiss | FW | Wigan Borough | July 1920 |
| Billy Clarkson | HB | Rotherham County | August 1920 |
| Patrick Norris | FW | Stockport County | August 1920 |
| Tom Bamford | FB | Rochdale | September 1920 |
| Richard Cragg | FW | Stockport County | September 1920 |
| Bill Taylor | FB | Rotherham County | November 1920 |
| Thomas Jackson | FW | Dundee | January 1921 |
| Frank Birchenough | GK | Released | April 1921 |
| Bob McGrory | FB | Stoke City | April 1921 |
| Bert Freeman | FW | Released | May 1921 |
| George Thompson | FB | Rotherham County | June 1921 |

== League campaign ==
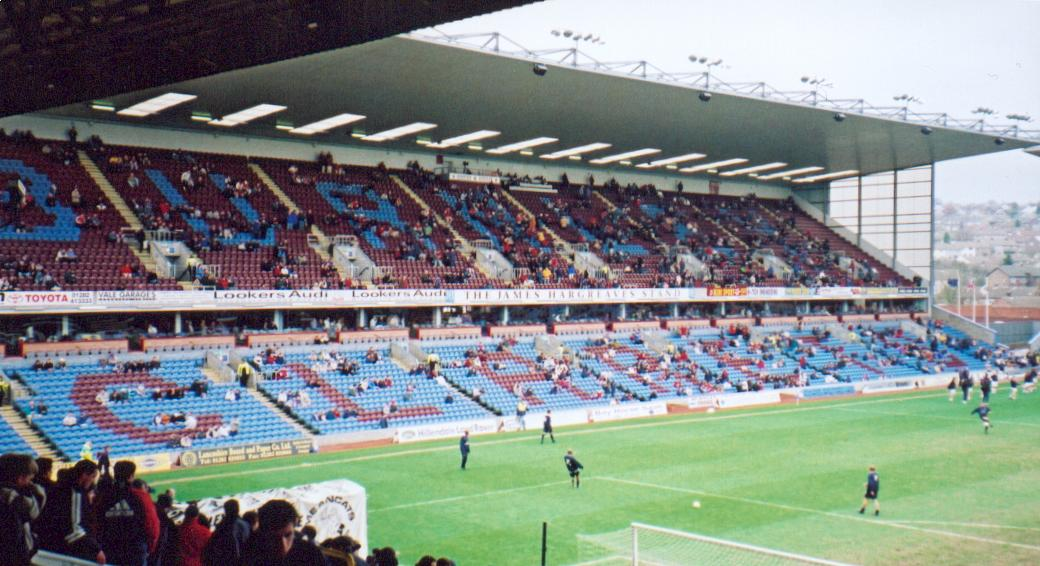
Burnley won 18 consecutive league and cup matches at Turf Moor (pictured here in 2001) between 6 September 1920 and 2 April 1921.

Burnley's league campaign began on 28 August 1920 with a home match against Bradford City, who had finished 15th in the league in 1919–20. The season began inauspiciously for Burnley as they lost 4–1, but the match did see eventual top scorer Joe Anderson score the first of his 25 league goals of the campaign. Two further away defeats followed, 1–0 at newly promoted Huddersfield Town and 2–0 at Bradford City, leaving Burnley at the bottom of the league table. This run of defeats was Burnley's worst start to a league season since 1906–07, when they also lost their opening three matches. Haworth subsequently made several changes to the team; goalkeeper Jerry Dawson and full back Tommy Boyle were reinstated, and Freeman and James Lindsay were dropped in favour of Billy Nesbitt and Benny Cross respectively. Burnley picked up their first win on 6 September 1920, beating Huddersfield Town 3–0 at Turf Moor with goals from Bob Kelly, Boyle, and Nesbitt. The Burnley News praised the team's "brilliant forward work" and singled out Boyle for particular praise, while noting that Cross had made an "excellent impression" on his debut. Burnley went on to defeat Middlesbrough 2–1 at home, and to draw with them 0–0 at Ayresome Park. On 25 September 1920, four players scored in a 4–0 victory against a weakened Chelsea team, giving Burnley their third successive home win.

October began with a 1–1 draw with Chelsea at Stamford Bridge, after which the team recorded four straight wins throughout the remainder of the month. Burnley achieved home and away victories against Bradford (Park Avenue), and repeated that feat in the next two matches against Tottenham Hotspur. The 2–0 victory on 30 October 1920 was the first time in the season that any team had been able to prevent Tottenham from scoring in a league match, but Burnley's performance at White Hart Lane was met with disapproval from the correspondent from the Daily Mail, who considered they had set out to stifle their opponents and in doing so "spoilt the match". Burnley's winning streak carried on into November, with goals from Kelly, Boyle and Cross helping the side to defeat Newcastle United 3–1 at home and 2–1 away to lift them to second place in the league. The home fixture was marred by tragedy when a charabanc transporting Burnley supporters from Grassington overturned, killing five people. After the next game, a 2–2 draw with Oldham Athletic at Boundary Park on 20 November 1920, Burnley moved to the top of the table on goal average, 11 weeks after having been at the bottom. In the return match at Turf Moor a week later, Oldham were comfortably beaten 7–1; Kelly scored four goals, and the others were added by Cross (two goals) and Boyle.

A win and a draw against Liverpool, followed by a 2–0 victory over Preston North End, took Burnley into the Christmas period three points clear at the top of the league. The convincing 6–0 win over Sheffield United on Christmas Day, in which Anderson scored four times, set a new club record unbeaten streak of 17 games, beating the record set during the 1897–98 campaign. Burnley continued their good form into 1921, beating Preston North End away before achieving two victories against local rivals Blackburn Rovers. The first of these wins, a 4–1 success, was watched by 41,534 spectators, the biggest home crowd of the season until then. The victory was followed by a 3–1 away win a week later. On 5 February 1921, Anderson scored five goals in a "brilliant" performance against Aston Villa as Burnley recorded their second 7–1 win of the season. The result saw Burnley equal the Football League record of 22 matches unbeaten, held by Sheffield United and Preston North End. A new league unbeaten record was set with a 0–0 draw with Aston Villa four days later. Despite losing George Halley to an illness which forced him to miss the remainder of the season, Burnley secured a late home win over Derby County in the following game, sending Derby to the bottom of the league table. February ended with a 3–1 victory against Bolton Wanderers in front of a crowd of 42,653, the largest league attendance ever at Turf Moor at the time. The team took four points from the next three matches. Burnley firstly drew 1–1 away against a Bolton Wanderers team who were unbeaten at home, in front of a then-record crowd of 54,609 at Burnden Park, before beating Arsenal 1–0 at Turf Moor. The following week Burnley secured an away draw at Arsenal, despite their opponents attacking for much of the game.

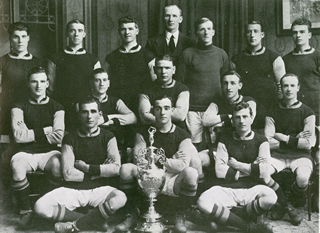
The team photograph of the championship-winning side

A late Cross goal gave Burnley a 1–0 win over Manchester United at Turf Moor, extending the team's unbeaten record to 30 matches. In the next match, Burnley lost a league fixture for the first time since 4 September 1920 when they were beaten 3–0 by Manchester City at Hyde Road. City were also challenging for the league title and eventually finished as runners-up. More than 37,000 spectators attended the match and several people were injured as the stadium became overcrowded. Burnley followed up the setback with a 3–0 win away at Manchester United; strong winds and a boggy playing surface led Burnley to adapt their usual short passing game, with good effect. A win over Manchester City the following weekend took the total number of league wins in the season to 23. Beset by injuries to the forward line, the team suffered its fifth league defeat of the campaign on 9 April 1921, losing 2–0 away at West Bromwich Albion.

Burnley played West Brom again seven days later, drawing 1–1. The team went into the match away at Everton on 23 April 1921 needing a draw to clinch the league championship with three games remaining. Everton took the lead 15 minutes into the game, but Cross scored the equalising goal three minutes later, and Burnley held on to become English champions for the first time in their history. Local newspapers were effusive in their praise of the Burnley side, calling them "the greatest team that ever was". The return fixture at Turf Moor the following week also finished 1–1, Cross again scoring the Burnley goal. In the penultimate game, Burnley were beaten 1–0 away at Sunderland, their sixth and final league defeat of the season. The campaign ended with a 2–2 draw against Sunderland on 7 May 1921 in front of a season-lowest crowd of 22,000. The draw took Burnley to a tally of 59 points, five points clear of second-placed Manchester City, and one short of West Bromwich Albion's then-record total of 60 points set in 1919–20.

At half time during the final match of the season, the championship trophy was paraded around the Turf Moor pitch accompanied by a marching band. After the full-time whistle was blown, supporters swarmed the pitch to celebrate the team's success. The Football League president, John McKenna, made the official presentation of the trophy to the Burnley captain Boyle and congratulated the side on their achievement, particularly praising "their splendid training and their beautiful football". Medals were awarded to the manager Haworth, the club trainer Charlie Bates and the eleven players who had featured in the match against Sunderland. Three more medals were later awarded to Eddie Mosscrop, David Taylor and Alf Basnett.

=== Match results ===
Key

- In Result column, Burnley's score shown first
- H = Home match
- A = Away match
- pen. = Penalty kick
- o.g. = Own goal

Results

| Date | Opponents | Result | Goalscorers | Attendance | League position |
|---|---|---|---|---|---|
| 28 August 1920 | Bradford City (H) | 1–4 | Anderson | 30,000 | 20 |
| 30 August 1920 | Huddersfield Town (A) | 0–1 | | 22,500 | 22 |
| 4 September 1920 | Bradford City (A) | 0–2 | | 26,000 | 22 |
| 6 September 1920 | Huddersfield Town (H) | 3–0 | Kelly, Boyle, Nesbitt | 30,000 | 21 |
| 11 September 1920 | Middlesbrough (H) | 2–1 | Cross, Anderson | 28,000 | 15 |
| 18 September 1920 | Middlesbrough (A) | 0–0 | | 30,000 | 15 |
| 25 September 1920 | Chelsea (H) | 4–0 | Boyle (pen.), Cross, Kelly, Nesbitt | 30,000 | 10 |
| 2 October 1920 | Chelsea (A) | 1–1 | Anderson | 45,000 | 11 |
| 9 October 1920 | Bradford (Park Avenue) (A) | 3–1 | Kelly (2), Dickinson (o.g.) | 24,000 | 10 |
| 16 October 1920 | Bradford (Park Avenue) (H) | 1–0 | Anderson | 25,000 | 7 |
| 23 October 1920 | Tottenham Hotspur (A) | 2–1 | Anderson (2) | 45,000 | 6 |
| 30 October 1920 | Tottenham Hotspur (H) | 2–0 | Kelly, Cross | 35,830 | 4 |
| 6 November 1920 | Newcastle United (A) | 2–1 | Boyle, Kelly | 50,000 | 4 |
| 13 November 1920 | Newcastle United (H) | 3–1 | Kelly, Cross, Boyle (pen.) | 38,860 | 2 |
| 20 November 1920 | Oldham Athletic (A) | 2–2 | Anderson, Weaver | 19,273 | 1 |
| 27 November 1920 | Oldham Athletic (H) | 7–1 | Kelly (4), Cross (2), Boyle | 22,569 | 1 |
| 4 December 1920 | Liverpool (A) | 0–0 | | 37,500 | 1 |
| 11 December 1920 | Liverpool (H) | 1–0 | Weaver | 35,860 | 1 |
| 18 December 1920 | Preston North End (H) | 2–0 | Anderson (2) | — | 1 |
| 25 December 1920 | Sheffield United (H) | 6–0 | Anderson (4), Cross, Kelly | 35,912 | 1 |
| 27 December 1920 | Sheffield United (A) | 1–1 | Kelly | 50,000 | 1 |
| 1 January 1921 | Preston North End (A) | 3–0 | Cross, Kelly, Anderson | 32,000 | 1 |
| 15 January 1921 | Blackburn Rovers (H) | 4–1 | Cross (2), Kelly, Boyle | 41,534 | 1 |
| 22 January 1921 | Blackburn Rovers (A) | 3–1 | Kelly, Mosscrop, Anderson | 43,000 | 1 |
| 5 February 1921 | Aston Villa (H) | 7–1 | Watson (pen.), Anderson (5), Lindsay | 40,000 | 1 |
| 9 February 1921 | Aston Villa (A) | 0–0 | | 40,000 | 1 |
| 12 February 1921 | Derby County (H) | 2–1 | Anderson, Lindsay | 30,000 | 1 |
| 23 February 1921 | Derby County (A) | 0–0 | | 17,000 | 1 |
| 26 February 1921 | Bolton Wanderers (H) | 3–1 | Kelly, Cross, Nesbitt | 42,653 | 1 |
| 5 March 1921 | Bolton Wanderers (A) | 1–1 | Anderson | 54,609 | 1 |
| 12 March 1921 | Arsenal (H) | 1–0 | Watson (pen.) | 30,000 | 1 |
| 19 March 1921 | Arsenal (A) | 1–1 | Anderson | 45,000 | 1 |
| 25 March 1921 | Manchester United (H) | 1–0 | Cross | 40,000 | 1 |
| 26 March 1921 | Manchester City (A) | 0–3 | | 42,000 | 1 |
| 28 March 1921 | Manchester United (A) | 3–0 | Boyle (pen.), Kelly, Anderson | 30,000 | 1 |
| 2 April 1921 | Manchester City (H) | 2–1 | Nesbitt, Anderson | 37,000 | 1 |
| 9 April 1921 | West Bromwich Albion (A) | 0–2 | | 16,000 | 1 |
| 16 April 1921 | West Bromwich Albion (H) | 1–1 | Kelly | 26,422 | 1 |
| 23 April 1921 | Everton (A) | 1–1 | Cross | 40,000 | 1 |
| 30 April 1921 | Everton (H) | 1–1 | Cross | 22,066 | 1 |
| 2 May 1921 | Sunderland (A) | 0–1 | | 20,000 | 1 |
| 7 May 1921 | Sunderland (H) | 2–2 | Nesbitt, Kelly | 22,000 | 1 |

=== Final league position ===
First Division final table, positions 1–5
| Pos | Club | Pld | W | D | L | F | A | GA | Pts |
|---|---|---|---|---|---|---|---|---|---|
| 1 | Burnley | 42 | 23 | 13 | 6 | 79 | 36 | 2.19 | 59 |
| 2 | Manchester City | 42 | 24 | 6 | 12 | 70 | 50 | 1.40 | 54 |
| 3 | Bolton Wanderers | 42 | 19 | 14 | 9 | 77 | 53 | 1.45 | 52 |
| 4 | Liverpool | 42 | 18 | 15 | 9 | 63 | 35 | 1.80 | 51 |
| 5 | Newcastle United | 42 | 20 | 10 | 12 | 66 | 45 | 1.47 | 50 |

== Other first team matches ==
Burnley's first match outside the league in the 1920–21 season was a friendly on 22 September 1920 against a Blackburn Rovers XI to mark the opening of Accrington Stanley's new stadium at Peel Park. Burnley won the game 10–1, with seven goals from Anderson as well as strikes from Lindsay, Walter Weaver and Jackson. Burnley's opening game in the FA Cup was an away tie at Leicester City on 8 January 1921. Kelly scored for the fourth game in succession and Anderson scored four goals as Burnley won the match 7–3, the first time the team had scored seven goals in a competitive match away from home. After the match, the Athletic News described Burnley as the best team in the country.

Following the win over Leicester City, Burnley were drawn against Queens Park Rangers at Turf Moor in the second round. Despite a good performance by their opponents, Burnley progressed to the third round with a 4–2 win, in which Kelly struck twice in the first half and Anderson scored either side of half time. In the third round, Burnley were handed an away tie at Hull City, who were struggling in the Second Division and had won only two league matches in the previous five months. Despite being without first-team regulars Halley and Anderson through injury, Burnley were expected to win comfortably, not having lost since 4 September 1920. Hull City played above all expectations and Burnley suffered a 3–0 defeat.

In April 1921, Burnley won the East Lancashire Charity Cup for the second consecutive season, beating Blackburn Rovers 8–2 on aggregate over two legs. The first leg was won 6–2 at Turf Moor thanks to goals from Mosscrop, Anderson, Cross and a hat-trick from Kelly, before strikes from Anderson and Lindsay gave Burnley a 2–0 win at Ewood Park. This success was followed by a 2–1 friendly victory over a Scottish Football League XI in a benefit match for Celtic winger Patsy Gallacher. Burnley also participated in the Lancashire Senior Cup; the league matches against Blackburn Rovers and Preston North End also counted as group stage matches in the competition. The team won all four of these games to qualify for the semi-finals, where they were drawn against Manchester City. The game took place on 9 May 1921, two days after the end of the league season. This meant Burnley were without captain Boyle, whose contract had expired following the match against Sunderland. Other changes were also made to the starting line-up, including the selection of back-up goalkeeper Moorwood in place of Dawson. Burnley lost the game 2–0, and their opponents went on to win the trophy that year.

As champions of the Football League, Burnley qualified for the Charity Shield. Burnley's opponents were Tottenham Hotspur, who had finished sixth in the First Division and beaten Wolverhampton Wanderers in the FA Cup final. In what was the last match of the 1920–21 campaign, Burnley fell to a 2–0 defeat at White Hart Lane on 16 May 1921. The game was not without controversy, as the Burnley players claimed that the second goal should have been disallowed despite the Tottenham goalscorer being onside, maintaining that the whistle had already been blown by the referee.

=== Match results ===
Key

- In Result column, Burnley's score shown first
- H = Home match
- A = Away match
- N = Neutral venue
- o.g. = Own goal

Results

| Date | Opponents | Competition | Result | Goalscorers | Attendance |
|---|---|---|---|---|---|
| 22 September 1920 | Blackburn Rovers XI (N) | Friendly | 10–1 | Anderson (7), Lindsay, Weaver, Jackson | — |
| 8 January 1921 | Leicester City (A) | FA Cup First Round | 7–3 | Anderson (4), Kelly, Cross, King (o.g.) | 29,149 |
| 29 January 1921 | Queens Park Rangers (H) | FA Cup Second Round | 4–2 | Anderson (2), Kelly (2) | 41,007 |
| 19 February 1921 | Hull City (A) | FA Cup Third Round | 0–3 | | 30,000 |
| 18 April 1921 | Blackburn Rovers (H) | East Lancashire Charity Cup | 6–2 | Kelly (3), Mosscrop, Cross, Anderson | 6,417 |
| 27 April 1921 | Blackburn Rovers (A) | East Lancashire Charity Cup | 2–0 | Anderson, Lindsay | 4,000 |
| 4 May 1921 | Scottish Football League XI (A) | Friendly | 2–1 | Kelly, Nesbitt | — |
| 9 May 1921 | Manchester City (A) | Lancashire Senior Cup Semi Final | 0–2 | | — |
| 16 May 1921 | Tottenham Hotspur (A) | Charity Shield | 0–2 | | 20,000 |

== Player details ==
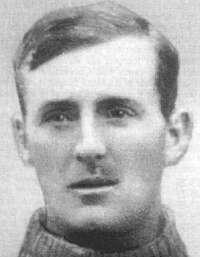
Goalkeeper Jerry Dawson missed only three games of the 1920–21 season.

Burnley manager Haworth used 24 different players during the 1920–21 season, and there were nine different goalscorers. The team played in a 2–3–5 formation throughout the campaign, with two fullbacks, three halfbacks, two outside forwards, two inside forwards and a centre forward. Billy Watson played the highest number of games, appearing in all 45 First Division and FA Cup matches. Nesbitt and Anderson each played 43 times. Anderson was the top goalscorer for Burnley in the campaign with 33 competitive goals, including 25 in the league, the highest total since Freeman's 36 goals in 1912–13. With a tally of 26 goals, Kelly was the second-highest scorer, followed by Cross with 16, including the goal that won the title for Burnley. Club captain Boyle was the highest-scoring full back, with seven goals in 38 league appearances. Winger Nesbitt scored five times during the season.

England international goalkeeper Dawson missed three games, two because of an injury sustained in the opening match. Centre forward Freeman, who had become the first ever Burnley player to score 100 league goals, and held the club record for most goals in a season, played only four matches. His final appearance for Burnley came in the FA Cup third round defeat to Hull City. Several players made bit-part contributions to the campaign; Brophy and McGrory made four and three first-team appearances respectively and Birchenough, Douglas, Lane, Moorwood, Bill Taylor and Billy Morgan played in two matches or fewer. Richardson and Pearson, both new signings in the 1920–21 season, failed to make a first-team appearance for Burnley during the campaign. Jackson was a squad member until January 1921, but did not play any league or cup games for Burnley in the 1920–21 campaign.

Players having played at least one first-team match (excluding friendlies)
| Player | Position | First Division | | FA Cup | | Other (Note: Matches in Charity Shield, East Lancashire Charity Cup, and Lancashire Senior Cup.) | | Total | |
| Player | Position | Apps | Goals | Apps | Goals | Apps | Goals | Apps | Goals |
|---|---|---|---|---|---|---|---|---|---|
| Joe Anderson | FW | 41 | 25 | 2 | 6 | 4 | 2 | 47 | 33 |
| Alf Basnett | FB | 15 | 0 | 0 | 0 | 4 | 0 | 19 | 0 |
| Frank Birchenough | GK | 2 | 0 | 0 | 0 | 0 | 0 | 2 | 0 |
| Tommy Boyle | HB | 38 | 7 | 3 | 0 | 3 | 0 | 44 | 7 |
| Tom Brophy | FB | 3 | 0 | 0 | 0 | 1 | 0 | 4 | 0 |
| Benny Cross | FW | 37 | 14 | 3 | 1 | 3 | 1 | 43 | 16 |
| Jerry Dawson | GK | 39 | 0 | 3 | 0 | 3 | 0 | 45 | 0 |
| George Douglas | HB | 2 | 0 | 0 | 0 | 0 | 0 | 2 | 0 |
| Bert Freeman | FW | 3 | 0 | 1 | 0 | 0 | 0 | 4 | 0 |
| George Halley | HB | 26 | 0 | 2 | 0 | 0 | 0 | 28 | 0 |
| Cliff Jones | FB | 31 | 0 | 3 | 0 | 3 | 0 | 37 | 0 |
| Bob Kelly | FW | 37 | 20 | 3 | 3 | 4 | 3 | 44 | 26 |
| Jack Lane | FW | 1 | 0 | 0 | 0 | 0 | 0 | 1 | 0 |
| James Lindsay | FW | 8 | 2 | 0 | 0 | 1 | 1 | 9 | 3 |
| Bob McGrory | FB | 3 | 0 | 0 | 0 | 0 | 0 | 3 | 0 |
| Len Moorwood | GK | 1 | 0 | 0 | 0 | 1 | 0 | 2 | 0 |
| Billy Morgan | HB | 0 | 0 | 0 | 0 | 1 | 0 | 1 | 0 |
| Eddie Mosscrop | FW | 14 | 1 | 2 | 0 | 3 | 1 | 19 | 3 |
| Billy Nesbitt | HB | 40 | 5 | 3 | 0 | 4 | 0 | 47 | 5 |
| Len Smelt | FB | 39 | 0 | 3 | 0 | 4 | 0 | 46 | 0 |
| Bill Taylor | FB | 2 | 0 | 0 | 0 | 0 | 0 | 2 | 0 |
| David Taylor | FB | 11 | 0 | 0 | 0 | 1 | 0 | 12 | 0 |
| Billy Watson | HB | 42 | 2 | 3 | 0 | 3 | 0 | 48 | 2 |
| Walter Weaver | HB | 27 | 2 | 2 | 0 | 1 | 0 | 30 | 2 |

FB = Full back, FW = Forward, GK = Goalkeeper, HB = Half back

== Aftermath ==
In a review of the season, the correspondent from the Burnley News described Burnley's play as "some of the finest football ever served up to any crowd". He attributed the team's success partly to their thorough training, noting that the Burnley players were often able to outlast their opponents in stamina, and partly to luck and a lack of serious injuries during the season. The team's successes on the playing field led to a marked increase in attendance figures; the total number of paying spectators was over 250,000 higher than the 1919–20 season, and gate receipts for league matches totalled a club record £34,000 (equivalent to £1,440,000 in 2025).

The Burnley board had planned a tour of Spain to take place shortly after the culmination of the league campaign; the trip had to be cancelled when the club received notice from the Spanish Football Federation that one of their intended opponents, Barcelona, had been suspended from all matches. Further tours of Norway and France were then arranged, but these also had to be abandoned after the Football Association refused to grant permission. At the end of the season five players were given free transfers by the club; Smelt and Birchenough, who had both played for Burnley during the campaign, and three reserve players. Moreover, two players—Freeman and George Thompson—were placed on the transfer list by the manager. New terms were agreed with top goalscorer Anderson and wing-half Watson to keep them at the club.

Burnley's 30-game unbeaten streak during the 1920–21 season stood as a Football League record for 83 years until it was surpassed by Arsenal, who completed the entire 2003–04 season without losing a league match. After the defeat to Bradford City on 28 August 1920, Burnley did not lose again at Turf Moor until 11 February 1922, when they were beaten 2–1 by Blackburn Rovers. In the same match, the halfback line of Boyle, Halley and Watson—used in 25 first-team games during 1920–21—was seen for the final time, having played together for the first time in September 1913. The majority of the championship-winning team remained intact going into the 1921–22 season, although players such as David Taylor and Weaver found themselves less involved in first-team matches.
