= Budapest Cup =

- Founded: 1914
- Abolished: 1914
- Region: Europe (UEFA)
- Teams: Two: (England) FA Cup winners (Scotland) Scottish Cup winners
- Last champions: (Scotland) Celtic (1st title)
- Most championships: (Scotland) Celtic (1 title)

The Budapest Cup was an association football tournament contested between the FA Cup winners Burnley and Scottish Cup winners Celtic. The charity competition was organized and hosted by the local Budapest club Ferencváros at the Üllői úti stadion in Hungary. As the result of a draw, Turf Moor was later selected to host the replay.

== Background ==
The Scottish Cup holders, and reigning league champions with a record points total, Celtic were on a six match tour of Austria, Hungary, and Germany. Celtic opened its tour against Ferencváros (2–2) before the Burnley match. Other matches followed against Wiener AC (6–2), Hertha Berlin (6–0), SC Leipzig (0–1), and BFC Preussen (5–0) before the team returned to Scotland.

The FA Cup holders Burnley had been on similar six match tour of Continental Europe at the time. Burnley played one match with Berlin Viktoria (2–1) before facing Celtic. After the Celtic match, Burnley finished off its own tour with matches against Ferencváros (1–3), Hungarian XI (2–0), which was an international trial match, Rapid Wien (3–1), and an Austrian XI (0–3).

== First Match ==
- Burnley squad

=== Team selection ===
Jerry Dawson, who missed the FA Cup final through injury, returned to replace Ronnie Sewell in goal for Burnley. Regular outside left Eddie Mosscrop was refused permission by his employers to go on the tour. Reuben Grice, who was recently signed from Midland League champions Rotherham County, played instead.

Celtic made only one alteration from the team who won the Scottish Cup final. McGregor deputised at right back in the absence of Alec McNair. Famous forward Jimmy Quinn was still missing as the result of a long-term injury.

=== Match ===
21 May 1914

Burnley (England)	1–1	(Scotland) Celtic
Boyle		McMenemy

Üllői úti stadion, Budapest
Attendance: 35,000 (Also reported as 20,000)

GK	(England) Jerry Dawson
RB	(England) Tom Bamford
LB	(Scotland) David Taylor
RH	(Scotland) George Halley
CH	(England) Tommy Boyle
LH	(England) Billy Watson
OR	(England) Billy Nesbitt
IR	(England) Dick Lindley
CF	(England) Bert Freeman
IL	(England) Teddy Hodgson
OL	(England) Reuben Grice
Manager:
(England) John Haworth

GK	(Scotland) Charlie Shaw
RB	(Scotland) Tony McGregor
LB	(Scotland) Joe Dodds
RH	(Scotland) James Young
CH	(Scotland) Peter Johnstone
LH	(Scotland) John McMaster
OR	(Scotland) Andy McAtee
IR	(Ireland) Patsy Gallacher
CF	(Scotland) Jimmy McColl
IL	(Scotland) Jimmy McMenemy
OL	(Scotland) John Browning
Manager:
(Scotland) Willie Maley

== Replay ==
After a meeting between representatives of both clubs, Turf Moor was selected for the replay because Burnley officials won on the toss of a coin. There was no trophy to be presented after the match because it was still in Budapest.

=== Team selection ===
Celtic travelled south without Alec McNair again. McGregor therefore retained his place in the team for the replay.

Burnley outside left Willie Husband left the club and joined Hamilton Academical the previous month.

=== Match ===
1 October 1914

Burnley (England)	1–2	(Scotland) Celtic
Watson		McColl; Gallacher

Turf Moor
Attendance: 12,000(Also reported as 10,000)
Referee: A.A. Jackson

GK	(England) Jerry Dawson
RB	(England) Tom Bamford
LB	(Scotland) David Taylor
RH	(Scotland) George Halley
CH	(England) Tommy Boyle
LH	(England) Billy Watson
OR	(England) Billy Nesbitt
IR	(England) Dick Lindley
CF	(England) Bert Freeman
IL	(England) Teddy Hodgson
OL	(England) Reuben Grice
Manager:
(England) John Haworth

GK	(Scotland) Charlie Shaw
RB	(Scotland) Tony McGregor
LB	(Scotland) Joe Dodds
RH	(Scotland) James Young
CH	(Scotland) Peter Johnstone (substituted off) (Note: Johnstone was forced off with an injury so McMenemy was moved to the half back line for the rest of the match.)
LH	(Scotland) John McMaster
OR	(Scotland) Andy McAtee
IR	(Ireland) Patsy Gallacher
CF	(Scotland) Jimmy McColl
IL	(Scotland) Jimmy McMenemy
OL	(Scotland) John Browning
Manager:
(Scotland) Willie Maley

== Trophy ==
The original trophy was a handsome silver cup in the shape of a lighthouse design. It stood at almost two feet high and studded with gems. The Hungarian News had donated the cup for the contest. It was allegedly valued at £65. Commemorative medals were crafted and to be awarded to both sets of players too.

Celtic never received the original trophy, but in April 1988, then Chairman of Ferencváros, Zoltan Magyar, presented his Celtic counterpart Jack McGinn with a new trophy in recognition of their victory and to mark the Celtic Park club's centenary celebrations.

The Ferencvaros Vase was presented to the club on the day the Hoops clinched the Premier Division title. It currently resides in the club boardroom.
