= History of Burnley F.C. =

History of an English football club

Burnley Football Club is an English professional association football club based in Burnley, Lancashire. It was founded on 18 May 1882 by members of rugby club Burnley Rovers, (Note: The Burnley Advertiser reported on 26 September 1874 that a rugby football team named "The Burnley Rovers Football Club" had "just been formed", already having 35 members.) who voted for a change from rugby to association football. The suffix "Rovers" was dropped in the following days. Burnley became professional in 1883—one of the first to do so—putting pressure on the Football Association (FA) to permit payments to players. In 1885, the FA legalised professionalism, so the team entered the FA Cup for the first time in 1885–86, and were one of the twelve founder members of the Football League in 1888–89, the world's first league football competition.

The team remained in the top tier until they were relegated to the Second Division at the end of the 1896–97 season. They won promotion the following season, but were relegated again in 1899–1900. Burnley achieved promotion back to the First Division in 1912–13 under manager John Haworth, and the following year, the side won the FA Cup for the first—and to date only—time, after they defeated Liverpool in the final. In the 1920–21 campaign, Burnley were crowned champions of England for the first time. During that season they embarked on a 30-match unbeaten run, setting an English record. Burnley remained in the top tier of English football until 1929–30, when they sank to the second tier. The team gained promotion back to the first tier in 1946–47 and stayed there for 24 consecutive seasons.

From the 1950s until the 1970s, under chairman Bob Lord, the club became renowned for its youth policy and scouting system, and was one of the first to set up a purpose-built training ground. With a squad primarily composed of players developed through the club's youth academy, Burnley won their second First Division title in 1959–60 under manager Harry Potts. The championship was secured with a final-day victory over Manchester City, making Burnley—home to just 80,000 residents—one of the smallest towns to have an English top-flight champion. (Note: Burnley's population had fallen by around 20 per cent since the club last won the First Division in 1921.) Between 1971 and 1983, Burnley yo-yoed between the first and third tiers, and in 1985, they were relegated to the Fourth Division, amid financial hardship. In 1986–87, a last-day win against Orient prevented relegation to the Football Conference, the highest level of non-League football. Burnley recovered and won the fourth-tier title in 1991–92 to become the second team to win all four professional divisions of the English football league system. They were promoted to the second tier in 1999–2000, and to the first-tier Premier League in 2008–09. Since then, the team have played in the top two tiers.

== Early years (1882–1888) ==
On 18 May 1882, members of rugby club Burnley Rovers gathered at the Bull Hotel in Burnley to vote on switching from rugby to association football, which was gaining prominence in the area. A large majority voted in favour of the change. The club secretary George Waddington met with his committee a few days later and put forward a proposal to drop "Rovers" from the club's name, giving Burnley a perceived advantage over other local clubs by carrying the name of the town, to which the committee members unanimously agreed. Burnley played several trial matches with local sides during the following weeks "to select the best possible elevens for the coming season"; the new team was a combination of the former rugby players and arrivals with association football experience.

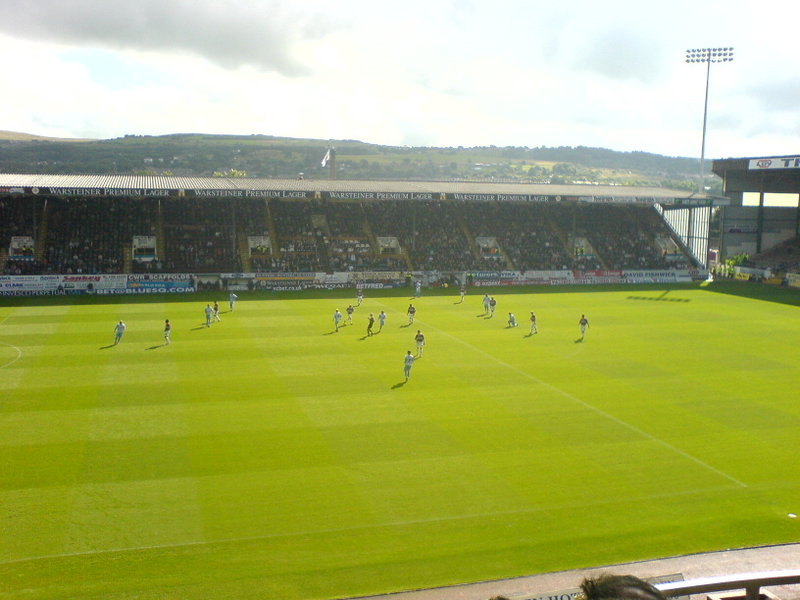
Burnley have played at Turf Moor since 1883 (2005 photograph).

On 10 August, Burnley won their first recorded game as an association football club, described by a local newspaper as "a trial match", against Burnley Wanderers by a scoreline of 4–0. They played the game in a blue and white kit—the colours of the former rugby club—at their home ground Calder Vale, which was also inherited from their predecessor. Tom Midgley, who had previously captained Burnley Rovers, served as the club's skipper. The team's first competitive fixture followed in October 1882, when they were defeated 8–0 by Astley Bridge in the Lancashire Cup. In February 1883, Burnley Cricket Club invited Burnley to move to a pitch adjacent to the cricket field at Turf Moor; both clubs have remained there since and Lancashire rivals Preston North End are the only professional football team worldwide to have continuously occupied the same ground for a longer period. The cricket club also made a donation of £65 (the equivalent of £7,000 as of 2025 (Note: UK Consumer Price Index inflation figures from 1209–2024 based on data from "Inflation calculator". Bank of England. London. 18 February 2026.)) toward the setup costs, and Burnley played their first match at Turf Moor on 17 February, losing 6–3 against Rawtenstall.

Thomas Dean, Burnley's medical officer of health, had launched a football tournament a month earlier to raise funds for the town's proposed new Victoria Hospital—a knockout competition between amateur clubs in the Burnley area, with the final played at Turf Moor. In June 1883, Burnley won the Dr Dean's Cup outright, defeating Burnley Ramblers 2–1 in the final to claim their first trophy. They also won the new Hospital Cup in 1884 and on multiple occasions in later years.

By the end of 1883, the club turned professional and signed many Scottish players, who were regarded as the best footballers by the Burnley committee. One of these, Dan Friel, soon assumed the roles of captain and coach. As a result of the move to professionalism, Burnley refused to join the Football Association (FA) and its FA Cup because the association barred professional players. In 1884, Burnley led a group of 35 clubs in the formation of the breakaway British Football Association (BFA) to challenge the supremacy of the FA. The threat of secession led to the FA changing its rule in July 1885, allowing professionalism, and the BFA subsequently ceased to exist. Burnley made their first appearance in the FA Cup in 1885–86, but with most professionals still barred from the competition under the FA rules of the period, (Note: Professionals could only play in the FA Cup and County FA competitions if they had been born or had resided within six miles (9.7 km) of their club's ground for a minimum of two years.) they fielded their reserve side and lost 11–0 to Darwen Old Wanderers, their record defeat. In October 1886, Turf Moor became the first ground to be visited by a member of the Royal Family when Queen Victoria's grandson Prince Albert Victor attended a match between Burnley and Bolton Wanderers after he opened the town's new Victoria Hospital. To commemorate the visit, Burnley received a set of white jerseys featured with a blue sash and embellished with the coat of arms of the Prince of Wales. The crest was regularly worn on the Burnley shirts until 1894–95.

== Football League founder members (1888–1912) ==
In 1888, Aston Villa director William McGregor founded the Football League, the world's first league football competition. Burnley were among the twelve founder members and one of the six Lancashire-based sides. They lost their first league match 5–2 to Preston North End, with Pat Gallocher scoring Burnley's first league goal. In the following fixture, William Tait became the first player in league history to score a hat-trick, netting three times in a 4–3 victory over Bolton Wanderers—Burnley’s first win in the competition. The club finished ninth in its first league season and was re-elected. (Note: There was no automatic relegation from the Football League until 1987. The bottom four clubs in the League, together with candidates from outside the League, applied for re-election. Each current League club had a vote. Burnley were re-elected.) In March 1889, Jack Yates became the first Burnley player to appear in a full international match, representing England against Ireland. He scored a hat-trick in a 6–1 win for England, but was never called up again. Burnley finished only one place from bottom in 1889–90, following a run of 17 winless games at the start of the season, although they claimed their first Lancashire Cup after beating local rivals Blackburn Rovers 2–0 in the final. Burnley's nicknames at this point were "Turfites", "Moorites" or "Royalites", as a result of their ground's name and the royal connection.

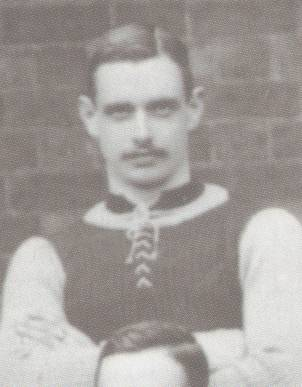
Jimmy Crabtree in 1897. The former Burnley captain was later described by several figures as the greatest player of all time.

On 1 September 1890, the first penalty kick in history was possibly taken at Turf Moor during a friendly match between Burnley and Darwen. The away side were awarded the penalty by the referee but it was saved by Burnley goalkeeper Archibald Kaye, who helped his team record a 3–2 win. (Note: In June 1890, the International Football Association Board added the penalty kick to the Laws of the Game, although penalty kicks were not officially adopted until the beginning of the 1891–92 season.) In 1891–92, Burnley recorded the largest league victory in their history with a 9–0 win over Darwen. The team finished the season in the top half of the table for the first time, placing 7th out of 14 teams. After finishing 6th in 1892–93 and 5th in 1893–94, Burnley appointed a team manager for the first time during the off-season in 1894. Previously, the team had been selected by the board of directors or a committee whose secretary held powers equivalent to those of a modern manager. The club appointed Burnley-born Harry Bradshaw, who had been involved with Burnley since its foundation and had served as a committee member since 1887. Bradshaw finished his first season with a mid-table finish, although he lost his captain, Burnley native Jimmy Crabtree, who transferred to Aston Villa. A utility player, Crabtree had featured for Burnley in every position, from goalkeeper to centre-forward. The Northern Whig wrote after his death in 1908 that he was "considered by many good judges of the game to be the greatest association football player of all time". This view was later echoed by both Charles Clegg and Howard Spencer in the 1930s.

Following a 10th-place finish in 1895–96, Burnley were relegated to the Second Division for the first time in the next campaign, after finishing third in the four-team play-off series—known as the test matches—between the bottom two First Division sides and the top two from the Second Division. Burnley won the second-tier title in 1897–98, losing only two of thirty matches before securing promotion via the test matches. The final game, against First Division club Stoke, was controversial as it finished 0–0 because both clubs needed only a draw to secure a place in the first tier. The game was later named "the match without a shot at goal". The Football League immediately withdrew the test match system in favour of automatic promotion and relegation. They also decided to expand the First Division from 16 clubs to 18 after a motion by Burnley, which meant that the other two teams—Blackburn Rovers and Newcastle United—also went into the first tier. Burnley finished in third place in their first season back in the top flight, their then highest league finish. During the off-season in 1899, Bradshaw resigned as manager and left for Woolwich Arsenal of the Second Division. First-team affairs were overseen by the directors until Ernest Mangnall was appointed in March 1900.

Under Mangnall, the team were relegated again in 1899–1900 and became embroiled in controversy when goalkeeper Jack Hillman attempted to bribe opponents Nottingham Forest during the last match of the season, which resulted in his suspension for the entire following campaign. It is possibly the earliest-recorded case of match fixing in football. Burnley remained in the Second Division during the first decade of the 20th century, usually finishing in mid-table, although they ended bottom of the league in 1902–03 and were subsequently re-elected. (Note: There was no automatic relegation from the Football League until 1987. The bottom three clubs in the League, together with candidates from outside the League, applied for re-election. Each current League club had a vote. Burnley were re-elected.) The struggling performances combined with the club's considerable financial debt saw manager Mangnall leave Burnley for Manchester United in October 1903; his successor was Spen Whittaker, who became the club's youngest-ever manager at age 32. In 1907, Burnley supporter Harry Windle was invited onto the club's board to become a director, and two years later, he was elected chairman. The club's finances improved under Windle's reign. The team reached the quarter-finals of the 1908–09 FA Cup but were eliminated by Mangnall's Manchester United in a replay. In the original match at Turf Moor, played on a snow-covered pitch, Burnley were leading 1–0 when the game was abandoned after 72 minutes. In April 1910, Whittaker was on his way to London by overnight train to register the signing of Harry Swift from Accrington Stanley. During the journey, he fell from one of the carriages, and died from his injuries shortly afterwards. The directors appointed John Haworth as the new manager, who subsequently signed Burnley's first overseas player, the German Max Seeburg. The Burnley directors also changed the club's colours from green to claret and blue. (Note: In the early years, Burnley used various kit designs and colours. From 1900 until 1910, the team wore an all-green jersey.) The side's form improved as only a loss in the final game of the 1911–12 season denied the club promotion.

== First major honour and decline (1912–1946) ==
In 1912–13, Burnley were promoted to the First Division—as the country's top scorers with 88 goals—and reached the FA Cup semi-finals for the first time but lost to Sunderland after a replay. The next season, the team consolidated their place in the top flight and won their first major honour, the FA Cup, after a 1–0 win against Liverpool in the final at Crystal Palace. Bert Freeman scored the only goal as Burnley became the first side to beat five First Division clubs in one cup season. Tommy Boyle, Burnley's captain, received the FA Cup trophy from King George V; it was the first time a reigning monarch attended an FA Cup final. During this period, Turf Moor's capacity was increased to 50,000, almost equal to the town's male population.

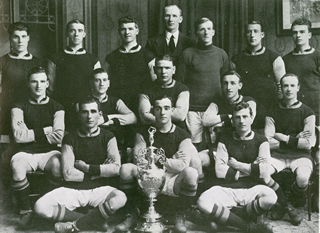
Team photograph of the Championship-winning side of the 1920–21 season

They finished fourth in 1914–15 before English football was suspended during the First World War. First-team players Jonathan Brown, William Pickering, along with reserve players William Johnson, Harry Langtree and Alfred Lorrimer were killed during the conflict, while Teddy Hodgson later died due to a kidney ailment. Upon resumption of full-time football in 1919–20, Burnley finished second to West Bromwich Albion and for the first time won the First Division championship in 1920–21. Burnley lost the season's opening three matches before they went on a 30-match run without defeat, an English record for unbeaten league games in a single season that lasted until Arsenal went invincible during the 2003–04 FA Premier League season. Burnley could not retain the title and finished third the next season, followed by a 15th-place finish in 1922–23. In October 1923, Burnley and opponents Sheffield United influenced the creation of the penalty arc, which was adopted by the International Football Association Board and introduced to the Laws of the Game in 1937. (Note: On 27 October 1923, Burnley hosted Sheffield United in a league game at Turf Moor, and the home team were awarded a penalty kick in the second half. United captain Billy Gillespie positioned his teammates along the edge of the penalty area, prompting Burnley penalty taker Bob Kelly to argue that they hindered his run-up and that the United players were not the required 10 yards (9.1 m) from the penalty spot. Although Kelly still converted the penalty kick to help Burnley win 2–0, Alex Leitch, a referee from the Sheffield & Hallamshire County FA, subsequently proposed a solution: the creation of a penalty arc outside the penalty area. The Green 'Un published the details, and Leitch also submitted his proposal to the Football Association president Charles Clegg, who passed it on to the International Football Association Board.)

In February 1924, Burnley beat Huddersfield Town 1–0 in the FA Cup third round in front of 54,775 supporters, still the record attendance at Turf Moor. Several months later, Haworth died of pneumonia, becoming the second Burnley manager to die while in the post. He was succeeded by Burnley-born Albert Pickles. The team struggled under his tenure and lost key player Bob Kelly to Sunderland in 1925, although his transfer fee of £6,500 (equivalent to £340,000 in 2025) broke the world record. Burnley avoided relegation by one point in 1925–26; they lost 10–0 in their opening match against Aston Villa but won three of the last five games, including a 7–1 away win against Birmingham in which Louis Page scored a club record six goals.

They attained a fifth-place finish in 1926–27—having led the championship for a brief spell during mid-season—but finished only 19th the following season, one point above the relegation zone. George Beel and Page scored 57 league goals between them during the latter season, with Beel netting a club record 35 league goals. In November 1927, Turf Moor hosted its only senior international fixture, between England and Wales for the British Home Championship. Burnley's Jack Hill captained England, while Page played as a forward; Hill scored an own goal to give the visitors a 2–1 win. Jerry Dawson, who holds the record for the most first team appearances in all competitions for Burnley with 569, retired in 1929 after 22 years at the club. A year later, in 1930, the side were relegated to the Second Division on goal average. (Note: Until 1976, the Football League's criteria for separating clubs finishing on the same number of points was goal average—the number of goals scored divided by the number of goals conceded. This system was later replaced by goal difference, the number of goals scored minus the number of goals conceded.) A drop in home attendances coupled with financial problems prompted the mid-season departure of key players Jack Bruton to Blackburn Rovers and Joe Devine to Newcastle United. Burnley's form remained inconsistent, and long-term injuries to several first-team players contributed to their relegation.

Burnley struggled in the Second Division and narrowly avoided further relegation in 1931–32 by two points. During the campaign, George Beel, the club's all-time top goal scorer with 188 goals, departed the club. In early 1932, gates at Turf Moor dropped under 5,000; to reattract the interest of the local community, a supporters' club was formed, after which the attendances started to improve slightly. The years before the outbreak of the Second World War were characterised by mid-table league finishes, which were broken only by an FA Cup semi-final appearance in 1935. During the same year, the club changed its kit from claret and blue jerseys to white shirts paired with black shorts. In March 1936, Tommy Lawton became the youngest player to appear for the club, aged 16 years and 174 days on his debut against Doncaster Rovers; this also made him the Football League's then youngest ever centre-forward. After he scored 16 goals in 25 appearances for Burnley, Lawton moved to Everton in December 1936 for a fee of £6,500 (equivalent to £380,000 in 2025), a then record for a player under 21. Burnley participated in the Wartime League and the Football League War Cup which continued throughout the Second World War until English football was fully restored in 1946. The club re-registered its colours as claret and blue in the same year, following a successful appeal in the Burnley Express that brought in enough donated coupons from supporters to obtain a new kit.

== Progressive and golden era (1946–1976) ==
In 1946–47, the first season of post-war League football, Burnley took second place in the Second Division and gained promotion under manager Cliff Britton. The team's defence was nicknamed the "Iron Curtain" as they had conceded only 29 goals in 42 league matches. The season also saw a run to the FA Cup final at Wembley, but it ended in a 1–0 defeat after extra time to Charlton Athletic. Britton's tactics became known as the "clockwork method". It aimed to get all players behind the ball when Burnley lost possession, before using short passing to attack after regaining it. This resulted in relatively few goals being both conceded and scored. Burnley finished third in 1947–48. During the season, Turf Moor recorded its highest seasonal average attendance with 33,621, and the largest attendance at a league match with 52,869 against Blackpool. The team consolidated their place in the First Division, with four top-half league finishes between 1948–49 and 1953–54.

Alan Brown, captain of Burnley's 1946–47 side, was appointed the club's manager in 1954, with Bob Lord becoming chairman a year later; Lord was later described by Arthur Hopcraft as "the Khrushchev of Burnley" due to his combative attitude. The club became one of the most progressive under their tenures. Burnley was one of the first football clubs to set up a purpose-built training ground, at Gawthorpe in July 1955, which included a medical room, a gymnasium, three full-size pitches and an all-weather surface. Brown helped to dig out the ground and "volunteered" several of his players to assist. During the following years, the club became renowned for its youth policy and scouting system, which yielded many young, talented footballers. The scouts, including Jack Hixon, were particularly based in North East England, Scotland and Northern Ireland. Later, in 1965, Blackpool captain Jimmy Armfield described Burnley's scouting system as "the best in the country", adding that the club "got to the top the hard way".

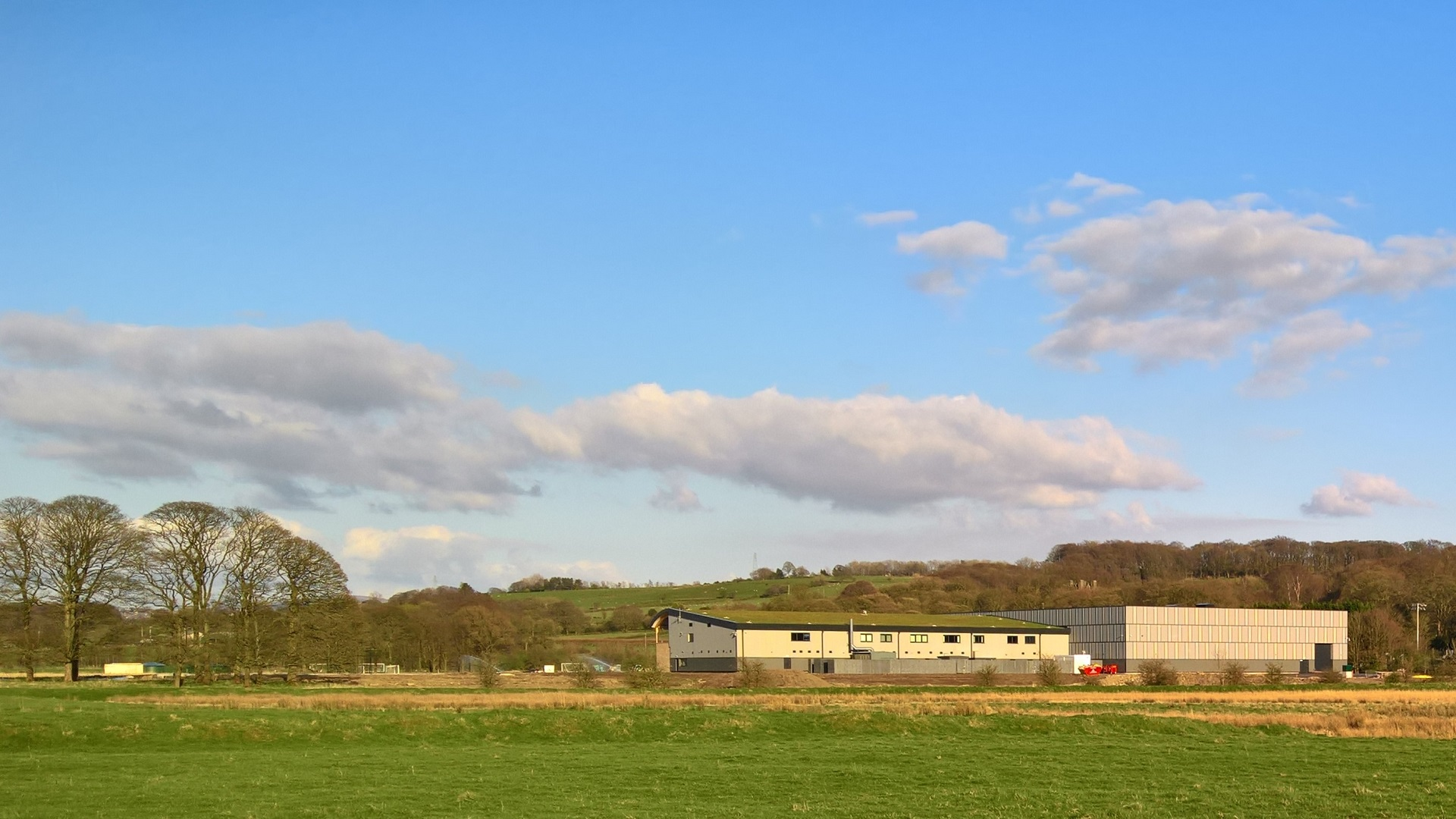
Gawthorpe (2017 photograph) was one of the first purpose-built training grounds.

In the 1955–56 season, Burnley reached the fourth round of the FA Cup, in which they were knocked out by Chelsea after four replays. In the following FA Cup campaign, the 17-year-old Ian Lawson scored a record four goals on his senior debut in the third round against Chesterfield. Burnley then equalled their record cup victory with a 9–0 win over New Brighton in the next round, despite Doug Winton missing a penalty. They were eliminated in the sixth round by Aston Villa after a replay. Brown left the club for Sunderland at the end of the 1956–57 season and was succeeded by Billy Dougall, who was forced to step down in January 1958 due to ill health. He remained at Burnley, however, serving as their physiotherapist until 1965. Former Burnley player Harry Potts was appointed as Dougall's successor.

Potts' side mainly revolved around captain Jimmy Adamson and Jimmy McIlroy, the team's playmaker, while his squad consisted mostly of players who were recruited from the club's youth academy. Only two players, McIlroy and Alex Elder, cost a transfer fee. Both players were bought from Northern Irish club Glentoran for £8,000 (the equivalent of £237,000 as of 2025) in 1950 and £5,000 (the equivalent of £101,000 as of 2025) in January 1959, respectively. Potts often employed the then unfashionable 4–4–2 formation and implemented a playing style which later became known as Total Football. Jimmy Greaves labelled Burnley's style of play as "smooth, skilled football that was a warming advertisement for all that was best about British football".

They endured a tense 1959–60 season in which Tottenham Hotspur and Wolverhampton Wanderers were the other contenders for the league title. Burnley won their second First Division championship on the final day with a 2–1 victory at Manchester City with goals from Brian Pilkington and Trevor Meredith. Although Burnley had been in contention all season, they had not led the table until the last match was played. (Note: Burnley topped the league table between 25 and 26 August 1959 after their second game but fell down to third place after the other teams completed their second fixtures.) The Daily Mirror concluded that "Burnley, the team of quiet men—five of them are part-timers and the whole outfit cost less than £15,000—snatched the First Division Championship from the teeth of the famous Wolves". With 80,000 inhabitants, the town of Burnley became one of the smallest to have an English first-tier champion. During the off-season, the club travelled to the United States to represent England in the International Soccer League, the first modern international American soccer tournament. Burnley defeated Bayern Munich (West Germany), Glenavon (Northern Ireland) and Nice (France) but finished runners-up in the group stage behind Scottish side Kilmarnock.

As a result of their title win, Burnley competed for the first time in a European competition in the 1960–61 European Cup. They defeated former finalists Stade de Reims in the first round but were eliminated by Hamburger SV in the quarter-finals. Burnley could not retain the league title, finishing in fourth place, and were eliminated in the semi-finals of both the FA Cup and the newly-created League Cup, although they had shared the FA Charity Shield with Wolves at the start of the campaign. (Note: Until 1993, in the event of a draw, the FA Charity Shield would be shared between the two competing teams, with each side having possession of the trophy for six months. Burnley and Wolverhampton Wanderers drew 2–2.) Burnley finished the 1961–62 First Division as runners-up to newly promoted Ipswich Town after they won only one of the last ten matches, and had a run to the 1962 FA Cup final, losing against Spurs. Jimmy Robson scored the 100th FA Cup final goal at Wembley but it was the only reply to Spurs' three goals. Adamson was named 1962 FWA Footballer of the Year, however, with McIlroy as runner-up.

The maximum wage in the Football League was abolished in 1961, which meant that clubs from small towns like Burnley could no longer compete financially with sides from larger settlements. The controversial departure of McIlroy to Stoke City in 1963 (Note: McIlroy was sold to Stoke City during the 1962–63 campaign for a fee of £25,000, after he was placed on the transfer list. This caused outrage among the Burnley fans, and some never returned to Turf Moor. In 1999, McIlroy stated that his friendship with Reg Cooke, a director at Burnley and rival of chairman Bob Lord, might have led to his sale by Lord.) and Adamson's retirement in 1964 also damaged the club's fortunes. Burnley retained their place in the First Division throughout the decade, however, finishing third in 1962–63 and 1965–66, with the club's Willie Irvine ending as the league's top goal scorer in the latter season. As a result of the third-place finish in the 1965–66 campaign, the club qualified for the 1966–67 Inter-Cities Fairs Cup. (Note: Burnley had sought to enter the Inter-Cities Fairs Cup in 1962–63 after finishing second in the 1961–62 First Division, but their application was rejected by the Fairs Cup committee as Burnley was neither a city nor the host of a trade fair. From 1964 onwards, qualification was determined by league position.) After defeating VfB Stuttgart, Lausanne Sports and Napoli, Burnley reached the quarter-finals of the competition, in which they were knocked out by West German side Eintracht Frankfurt. The team had a run to the League Cup semi-final in 1968–69 but were eliminated by Swindon Town after a replay.

After 12 years in the post, Potts stepped aside as manager and was replaced by Adamson in February 1970, who hailed his young squad as the "Team of the Seventies". Adamson was unable to halt the decline and the club was relegated in 1970–71. It ended an unbroken top flight spell of 24 consecutive seasons during which Burnley had often finished in the top half of the league table. They returned to the top flight after winning the 1972–73 Second Division title, having lost only four times in 42 matches. The club was invited to play in the 1973 FA Charity Shield, (Note: The 1972–73 First Division champions Liverpool and the 1972–73 FA Cup winners Sunderland declined to compete in the 1973 FA Charity Shield, so Manchester City—the reigning holders of the Shield—and Second Division champions Burnley played instead.) which it won against Manchester City, the reigning holders of the shield. Burnley finished sixth on their return to the first tier, and reached the FA Cup semi-finals but lost to Newcastle United. In the 1974–75 campaign, they challenged for the league title until the latter part of the season, when suspensions and injuries to key players led to a collapse in form, with only one win in their final 10 matches. Burnley ultimately finished 10th, eight points behind champions Derby County. The season also brought a shock defeat in the FA Cup, as Southern League side Wimbledon beat them 1–0 at Turf Moor. Adamson left Burnley in January 1976, and the team were relegated from the First Division later that year. During this period, a drop in home attendances combined with an enlarged debt forced Burnley to sell key players such as Martin Dobson and Leighton James, which caused a rapid decline in the club's fortunes.

== Near oblivion (1976–1987) ==
Graph showing Burnley's performance from the inaugural season of the Football League in 1888–89 to the present

Three mid-table finishes in the Second Division followed—although Burnley won the Anglo-Scottish Cup in 1978–79—before they were relegated to the Third Division in 1979–80 for the first time. In 42 league games, Burnley were victorious only 6 times and won none of the first 16 or the last 16 matches. In September 1981, after the club was in the Third Division relegation zone and close to bankruptcy, Lord decided to retire. The team then had only 3 more defeats in 39 games and were promoted as champions under the management of former Burnley player Brian Miller. They were relegated again the following year, although the team reached the FA Cup quarter-finals and the League Cup semi-finals.

The board made several managerial changes in a search for success; in early 1983, Miller was replaced with Frank Casper, who was succeeded by John Bond before the 1983–84 season. Bond was the first manager since Frank Hill (1948–1954) without a previous playing career at the club. The fans criticised Bond for increasing Burnley's debt by signing expensive players, and for selling Lee Dixon, Brian Laws and Trevor Steven. In August 1984, Bond was replaced with John Benson, who was in charge when Burnley were relegated to the Fourth Division for the first time at the end of the 1984–85 season. They were managed briefly by Martin Buchan and then Tommy Cavanagh during 1985–86 before Miller returned in July 1986. In the 1986–87 season, the Football League introduced automatic relegation and promotion between the Fourth Division and the Football Conference, the top tier of non-League football in England. Burnley struggled throughout the campaign, and suffered a 3–0 FA Cup first round defeat at non-League Telford United. Burnley went into the season's last league match in bottom place; they needed to win against Orient, for Lincoln City to lose their game, and Torquay United to not win theirs. A 2–1 win before a crowd of over 15,000—five times more than the club's seasonal average (Note: The average home league attendance before the match was 2,800.)—with goals from Neil Grewcock and Ian Britton kept Burnley in the Fourth Division as Torquay drew and Lincoln lost. The Burnley board had reportedly attempted to purchase almost-bankrupt Welsh club Cardiff City and relocate it to Turf Moor if Burnley were relegated; this would have been the Football League's first franchise operation. During the 1987 off-season, the club reinstated its scouting system and retained only seven players, with Miller tasked with rebuilding the squad on a limited budget.

== Recovery (1987–2009) ==
In 1988, Burnley were back at Wembley to play Wolverhampton Wanderers in the Associate Members' Cup final, which they lost 2–0. The match was attended by more than 80,000 people, a record for a game between two teams from the fourth tier. During this period, Burnley had a new local rival in Colne Dynamoes, who were rapidly progressing through the English non-League system. Colne's chairman-manager Graham White made a proposal for a groundshare of Turf Moor and attempted to buy the club in early 1989, but the Burnley board rejected these offers. In 1990–91, Burnley qualified for the Fourth Division play-offs under manager Casper but were eliminated in the semi-final by Torquay United. Burnley won the league title the following season under their new manager Jimmy Mullen, in what became the final campaign of the Fourth Division before the league reorganisation. Mullen had succeeded Casper in October 1991 and won his first nine league matches as manager. By winning the fourth tier title, Burnley became only the second club to win all four professional divisions of English football, after Wolverhampton Wanderers. In 1993–94, the side won the Second Division play-offs and gained promotion to the second tier. They won 3–1 on aggregate against Plymouth Argyle in the semi-final and faced Stockport County in the final; Burnley won the game 2–1 as two Stockport players were sent off. Relegation followed after one season, although the club was granted £2.25 million (the equivalent of £4.63 million as of 2025) by the Football Trust as a result of its season at the second level. These funds had to be spent within 12 months and helped to convert Turf Moor into an all-seater stadium to fulfil the safety recommendations of the Taylor Report. The North and the Jimmy McIlroy Stands replaced the Longside and the Bee Hole End terraces in 1996 at a total cost of over £5 million to take Turf Moor's capacity to almost 23,000. In 1997–98, a final-day 2–1 victory over Plymouth prevented relegation back into the fourth tier. Chris Waddle was Burnley's player-manager, but he was replaced by Stan Ternent during the 1998 off-season. Under Ternent, Burnley finished second in 1999–2000 and gained promotion to the second tier; the team's striker and lifelong Burnley fan Andy Payton was the division's top goal scorer.

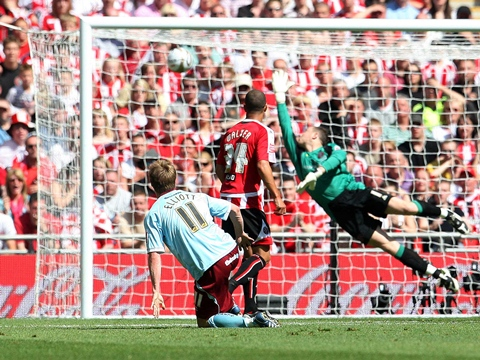
Wade Elliott's goal earned Burnley a 1–0 victory over Sheffield United in the Championship play-off final, which resulted in the Clarets reaching the highest level of English football for the first time in 33 years.

The side became serious contenders for a promotion play-off place during the 2000–01 and 2001–02 seasons. In the latter campaign, Burnley finished level on points with sixth-placed Norwich City, but missed out on the last play-off place on goal difference by one goal. In early 2002, financial problems caused by the collapse of ITV Digital brought the club close to administration. Ternent was sacked in June 2004, after the club narrowly avoided relegation with a squad composed of several loaned players and some players who were not entirely fit. Steve Cotterill was then appointed as manager. In 2006, Turf Moor and Gawthorpe were sold to Longside Properties for £3 million (equivalent to £5,180,000 in 2025) to resolve the club's financial problems; chairman Barry Kilby owned 51 per cent of the company's shares, while Burnley director John Sullivan held the remaining 49 per cent. In the 2006–07 campaign, Burnley went 19 consecutive games without a win between December and March. The sequence of draws and losses ended in April, when Burnley beat Plymouth 4–0 at home, and a short run of good form saw them finish comfortably above the relegation zone, ensuring they remained in the Championship.

Another run of poor results the following season led to Cotterill's departure in November 2007; his replacement was Owen Coyle. The 2008–09 campaign, Coyle's first full season in charge, ended with Burnley's highest league finish since 1976, fifth in the second tier. They qualified for the Championship play-offs and defeated Reading 3–0 on aggregate in the semi-final. They then beat Sheffield United in the Championship play-off final, with Wade Elliott scoring the only goal of the game, which meant promotion to the top flight after 33 years. Burnley also reached the League Cup semi-final for the first time in over 25 years after they beat local clubs Bury and Oldham Athletic, and London-based clubs Fulham, Chelsea and Arsenal. In the semi-finals, Burnley played Tottenham Hotspur but lost the first leg 4–1. Burnley led 3–0 at home after 90 minutes in the second leg, (Note: In the League Cup, the away goals rule only comes into play after extra time has been played. The League Cup abolished the extra time and away goals rules from the 2018–19 edition.) but were eliminated after Spurs scored two goals in the last two minutes of extra time.

== Premier League football and back in Europe (2009–2020) ==
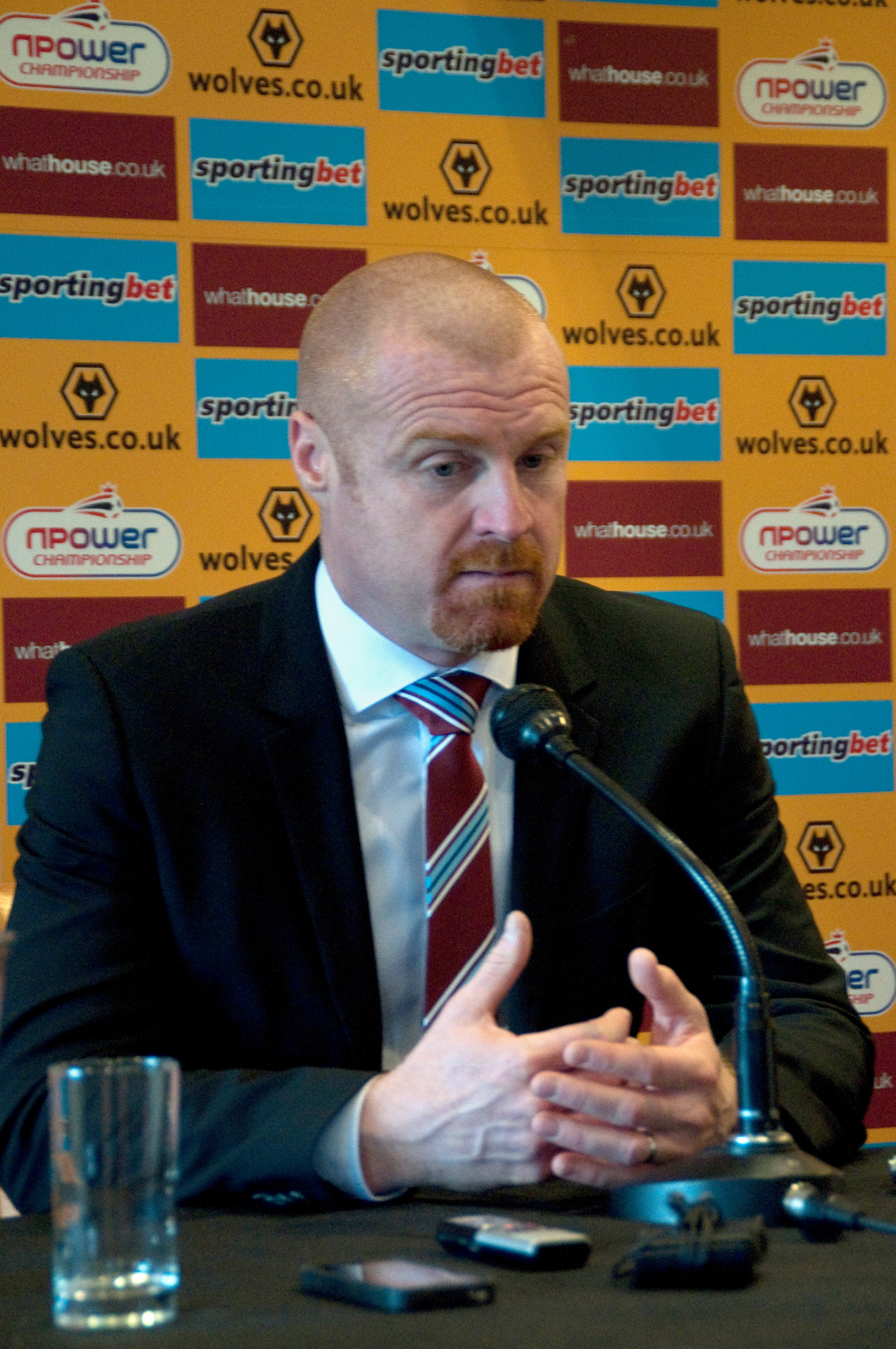
Manager Sean Dyche guided Burnley to two promotions to the Premier League.

After the team's promotion, Burnley became the one of smallest towns to host a Premier League club. The side started the 2009–10 season well and became the first newly promoted team in the competition to win their first four home games, including a 1–0 victory against defending champions Manchester United. Coyle left the club in January 2010 to manage local rivals Bolton Wanderers, who he said were "5 or 10 years ahead" of Burnley. He was replaced with former player Brian Laws, under whom Burnley's form deteriorated, ending in relegation after a single season in the Premier League. Laws was dismissed in December 2010 and replaced by Eddie Howe, who guided the team to an eighth-place finish in 2010–11, missing out on a play-off place. In October 2012, Howe left Burnley to rejoin Bournemouth "for personal reasons". He was replaced in the same month with former Watford manager Sean Dyche.

Before the start of the 2013–14 campaign, Turf Moor and Gawthorpe returned to club ownership after a seven-year period. Burnley were tipped as relegation candidates by the bookies as Dyche had to work with a tight budget and a small squad, and their top goal scorer from the previous season, Charlie Austin, had moved to Championship rivals Queens Park Rangers. In Dyche's first full season in charge, however, Burnley finished second and were promoted back to the Premier League. The new strike partnership of Danny Ings and Sam Vokes had 41 league goals between them. Dyche used only 23 players during the season, which was the joint-lowest in the division, and had paid only one transfer fee—£400,000 for striker Ashley Barnes. The club finished the following season in 19th place and were again relegated to the Championship. In 2015–16, Burnley won the Championship title when they equalled their 2013–14 tally of 93 points and ended the season with a run of 23 undefeated league games. New signing Andre Gray scored 23 goals for Burnley and became the league's top goal scorer.

The side finished the 2016–17 season in 16th place, six points above the relegation zone, and were guaranteed to play consecutive seasons in the top flight for the first time in the Premier League era. In that season's FA Cup, Burnley were eliminated in the fifth round at home by National League club Lincoln City, who won the game 1–0. It was Burnley's first FA Cup home defeat against a non-League side while in the top flight since their 1975 loss to Wimbledon. During the year, the club's new Barnfield Training Centre was completed and replaced the 60-year-old Gawthorpe. Dyche was involved in the design and had willingly tailored his transfer spending as he and the board focused on the club's infrastructure and future. Burnley finished the 2017–18 season in seventh place, winning more points in away matches than at Turf Moor; it was the club's highest league finish since 1973–74. They qualified for the 2018–19 UEFA Europa League, their first competitive European campaign in 51 years, but were eliminated in the play-off round by Greek side Olympiacos after the team had defeated Aberdeen and İstanbul Başakşehir in the previous qualifying rounds. The 2019–20 season was interrupted for three months because of the COVID-19 pandemic before being completed behind closed doors; Burnley concluded the campaign in 10th place, five points below the European qualification places.

== Decline under American owners (2020–present) ==
In December 2020, American investment company ALK Capital acquired an 84% stake in Burnley for £170 million, with Alan Pace becoming the club's new chairman. It was the first time the club was run by anyone other than local businessmen and Burnley supporters. ALK borrowed much of the takeover money, and the loan debts were transferred to the club. As a result of this leveraged takeover, Burnley went from being debt-free to being saddled with debts of around £100 million, at interest rates of about 8 per cent. In April 2022, Pace sacked Dyche following a run of poor results. Burnley gained eleven points from eight matches under caretaker manager Mike Jackson, but were relegated to the Championship after losing to Newcastle United on the final day of the season, finishing 18th and ending a six-season spell in the top flight. Burnley later argued that Everton, one of the clubs involved in the relegation battle, had deprived them of a realistic chance of staying up through breaches of the Premier League's Profitability and Sustainability Rules. The club succeeded in a legal claim against Everton in 2026, receiving nearly £40 million in compensation and interest in what is believed to be the first decision of its kind.

The 36-year-old Belgian Vincent Kompany was appointed Burnley's manager during the 2022 off-season, becoming the first person from outside the British Isles to manage the club. During his first months in charge, he signed 16 players—mostly young and foreign—as he rebuilt the squad on a budget. Kompany also implemented a possession-based, attacking style of play. He immediately led Burnley back to the Premier League with seven matches remaining, setting a Championship record for earliest promotion. The club later secured the Championship title with a 1–0 victory at local rivals Blackburn Rovers. Burnley gained 101 points during the season and became the first club to surpass the 100-point mark in the division since Leicester City in 2014. Huddersfield Town manager Neil Warnock labelled the Burnley side as the "best Championship team in 25 years".

During the 2023–24 season, Burnley were again relegated from the Premier League, finishing 19th out of 20 teams. The Independent ranked it as "one of the Premier League's worst-ever relegations", partly due to the club having been "naive in the transfer market, naive on the pitch and, by extension, naive in the boardroom". Shortly afterwards, however, Kompany went to Bayern Munich for a fee of £10.2 million, which made him one of the most expensive managers in history. ALK used a data-driven approach to find a successor and appointed Scott Parker as head coach. Described by The Guardian as "far more pragmatic" than Kompany, Parker led Burnley to promotion back to the top flight at the first attempt, ending the 2024–25 season with a club record 33-match unbeaten run and finishing on 100 points. The team conceded only 16 goals in 46 matches—an average of 0.35 per game—setting the best defensive record in English league history. They kept 30 clean sheets (equalling Port Vale's record from 1953–54) and became the first English side to go an entire league season without conceding more than one goal in any match. Burnley also became the first club to twice gain at least 100 points in the same division. Despite this, they finished second behind Leeds United on goal difference, becoming the first team in Football League history to reach a three-figure points total without winning the title.

In August 2025, during a pre-season friendly against Italian side Lazio at Turf Moor, Burnley became the first ever football club to live stream a game in immersive virtual reality. (Note: The broadcast, developed by club partner Rezzil, offered viewers a virtual seat inside the ground with a panoramic view of the pitch, live commentary, ambient crowd noise, and real-time visuals including club branding and player kits.) The team dropped to the second tier again later that season, with Parker departing shortly before the end of the campaign. They finished with a club record low tally of 22 points and recorded only four wins.
