= Basnett =

Basnett is a surname. Notable people with the surname include:

- Alf Basnett (1893–1966), British soccer player
- David Basnett (1924–1989), British trade union leader
- Fred Basnett (1924–1997), British soccer player
- John Basnett (born 1957), British rugby union and rugby league player
