= William Lindsay (Scottish footballer) =

Scottish Footballer

Personal information
- Full name: William Whitehill Lindsay
- Place of birth: Johnstone, Scotland
- Date of death: 1976 (aged 89–90)
- Place of death: Glasgow, Scotland
- Position: Outside left

Senior career*
Years	Team	Apps	(Gls)
1906–1914	Morton	186	(42)
1913–1914	→ Glentoran		
- * Club domestic league appearances and goals

William Whitehill Lindsay (1886 – 1976) was a Scottish footballer who played as an outside left, mainly for Morton where he was a regular in Scottish Division One for seven seasons. During that period the Greenock club usually finished towards the bottom of the league table – they were 17th of 18 teams in 1908–09 and 1909–10, though improved to 6th place in 1911–12.

His younger brother James was also a footballer; the siblings played for Belfast club Glentoran when they won the Irish Cup in 1914 (both scoring in the final), followed by the international Vienna Cup.
