= John McMaster =

John McMaster may refer to:

- John McMaster (footballer, born 1893) (1893–1954), Scottish footballer (Celtic FC)
- John McMaster (footballer, born 1955), Scottish footballer (Aberdeen FC)
- John McMaster (mayor) (1830–1924), mayor of Brisbane
- John Bach McMaster (1852–1932), American historian

== See also ==
- John H. McMasters (1939–2008), American aeronautical engineer
