= 1928–29 Newport County A.F.C. season =

Welsh association football club season

Newport County
1928–29 season
- Manager: Jimmy Hindmarsh
- Stadium: Somerton Park
- Third Division South: 16th
- FA Cup: 2nd round
- Welsh Cup: 6th round
- Top goalscorer: League: Pugh (12); All: Richardson (15)
- Highest home attendance: 7,737 vs Swindon Town (15 September 1928)
- Lowest home attendance: 1,835 vs Torquay United (2 February 1929)
- Average home league attendance: 3,695
Home colours	Away colours

The 1928–29 season was Newport County's ninth season in the Football League, eighth season in the Third Division South and ninth season overall in the third tier.

== Season review ==
=== Results summary ===
Overall								Home						Away					
Pld	W	D	L	GF	GA	GAv	Pts	W	D	L	GF	GA	Pts	W	D	L	GF	GA	Pts
42	13	9	20	69	86	0.802	35	8	6	7	37	28	22	5	3	13	32	58	13

Source: rsssf.com

=== Results by round ===
Round	1	2	3	4	5	6	7	8	9	10	11	12	13	14	15	16	17	18	19	20	21	22	23	24	25	26	27	28	29	30	31	32	33	34	35	36	37	38	39	40	41	42
Ground	H	A	A	H	A	H	A	H	A	H	H	A	H	A	H	H	H	A	H	A	A	H	A	H	H	A	A	A	H	A	A	H	A	A	H	H	A	H	H	A	A	H
Result	W	D	D	D	D	L	L	W	L	D	L	L	L	W	L	D	L	L	L	L	L	W	L	L	W	W	W	L	W	L	L	D	W	W	W	W	L	W	D	L	L	D
Position	6	3	5	6	4	11	15	11	12	13	16	17	18	16	18	16	17	18	19	22	22	21	22	22	21	20	19	19	19	20	20	20	17	17	16	15	16	15	15	16	16	16

Updated to match(es) played on 4 May 1929. Source: statto.com
A = Away; H = Home; W = Win; D = Draw; L = Loss

== Fixtures and results ==
=== Third Division South ===
Date	Opponents	Venue	Result	Scorers	Attendance
25 Aug 1928	Walsall	H	3–1	Harper, Gittins, Waterston	6,035
30 Aug 1928	Queens Park Rangers	A	0–0		9,920
1 Sep 1928	Charlton Athletic	A	2–2	Bowsher, Waterston	10,718
6 Sep 1928	Queens Park Rangers	H	0–0		5,293
8 Sep 1928	Crystal Palace	A	1–1	Gittins	14,796
15 Sep 1928	Swindon Town	H	0–1		7,737
22 Sep 1928	Torquay United	A	1–4	Wardell	5,908
29 Sep 1928	Gillingham	H	5–0	Waterston 3, Bowsher, Thomas	4,354
6 Oct 1928	Plymouth Argyle	A	2–5	Thomas, Wardell	11,597
13 Oct 1928	Fulham	H	3–3	Waterston 2, Watts	6,994
20 Oct 1928	Northampton Town	H	0–3		4,405
27 Oct 1928	Coventry City	A	1–3	Gittins	10,876
3 Nov 1928	Luton Town	H	1–2	Waterston	4,177
10 Nov 1928	Brentford	A	3–1	Gittins, Waterston, Wardell	5,395
17 Nov 1928	Bournemouth & Boscombe Athletic	H	0–2		3,309
1 Dec 1928	Southend United	H	2–2	Reid, Ward	3,725
15 Dec 1928	Brighton & Hove Albion	H	1–2	Gittins	2,174
22 Dec 1928	Norwich City	A	1–3	Wardell	4,824
25 Dec 1928	Watford	H	0–2		3,351
26 Dec 1928	Watford	A	0–3		9,463
29 Dec 1928	Walsall	A	1–3	Thomas	5,940
5 Jan 1929	Charlton Athletic	H	2–0	Gittins, Young	2,401
12 Jan 1929	Merthyr Town	A	1–2	Thomas	2,603
19 Jan 1929	Crystal Palace	H	1–3	Wardell	3,399
2 Feb 1929	Torquay United	H	4–1	Maidment, Pugh, G.Richardson, Wardell	1,835
9 Feb 1929	Gillingham	A	4–0	Pugh 2, G.Richardson 2	3,223
23 Feb 1929	Fulham	A	3–2	Pugh, Wardell, G.Richardson	15,361
2 Mar 1929	Northampton Town	A	0–7		8,864
9 Mar 1929	Coventry City	H	2–1	Pugh, G.Richardson	4,398
16 Mar 1929	Luton Town	A	2–5	Gittins, Buckler	8,782
20 Mar 1929	Exeter City	A	1–6	G.Richardson	2,255
23 Mar 1929	Brentford	H	1–1	Pugh	3,090
29 Mar 1929	Bristol Rovers	A	3–0	G.Richardson 2, Young	10,375
30 Mar 1929	Bournemouth & Boscombe Athletic	A	1–0	G.Richardson	5,190
1 Apr 1929	Bristol Rovers	H	2–0	Pugh, Gittins	5,659
6 Apr 1929	Merthyr Town	H	6–1	Pugh 3, Thomas 2, Young	3,599
13 Apr 1929	Southend United	A	2–4	Pugh, Thomas	4,820
18 Apr 1929	Plymouth Argyle	H	1–0	Pugh	3,499
20 Apr 1929	Exeter City	H	1–1	Thomas	3,058
27 Apr 1929	Brighton & Hove Albion	A	1–2	Thomas	4,759
1 May 1929	Swindon Town	A	2–5	G.Richardson 2	1,542
4 May 1929	Norwich City	H	2–2	Wardell 2	2,117

=== FA Cup ===
Round	Date	Opponents	Venue	Result	Scorers	Attendance
1	24 Nov 1928	Woking	H	7–0	Young 3, Pugh 2, Gittins, Reid	3,800
2	8 Dec 1928	Norwich City	A	0–6		9,072

=== Welsh Cup ===
Round	Date	Opponents	Venue	Result	Scorers	Attendance
5	28 Feb 1929	Swansea Town	H	5–1	G.Richardson 4, Maidment	
6	25 Mar 1929	Cardiff City	H	0–1		

== League table ==
Pos	Team	Pld	W	D	L	F	A	GA	Pts
1	Charlton Athletic	42	23	8	11	86	60	1.433	54
2	Crystal Palace	42	23	8	11	81	67	1.209	54
3	Northampton Town	42	20	12	10	96	57	1.684	52
4	Plymouth Argyle	42	20	12	10	83	51	1.627	52
5	Fulham	42	21	10	11	101	71	1.423	52
6	Queens Park Rangers	42	19	14	9	82	61	1.344	52
7	Luton Town	42	19	11	12	89	73	1.219	49
8	Watford	42	19	10	13	79	74	1.068	48
9	Bournemouth	42	19	9	14	84	77	1.091	47
10	Swindon Town	42	15	13	14	75	72	1.042	43
11	Coventry City	42	14	14	14	62	57	1.088	42
12	Southend United	42	15	11	16	80	75	1.067	41
13	Brentford	42	14	10	18	56	60	0.933	38
14	Walsall	42	13	12	17	73	79	0.924	38
15	Brighton & Hove Albion	42	16	6	20	58	76	0.763	38
16	Newport County	42	13	9	20	69	86	0.802	35
17	Norwich City	42	14	6	22	69	81	0.852	34
18	Torquay United	42	14	6	22	66	84	0.786	34
19	Bristol Rovers	42	13	7	22	60	79	0.759	33
20	Merthyr Town	42	11	8	23	55	103	0.534	30
21	Exeter City	42	9	11	22	67	88	0.761	29
22	Gillingham	42	10	9	23	43	83	0.518	29

Key	
	Division Champions
	Re-elected
	Failed re-election

P = Matches played; W = Matches won; D = Matches drawn; L = Matches lost; F = Goals for; A = Goals against; GA = Goal average; Pts = Points
