= Tom Bamford =

English footballer

Personal information
- Date of birth: 1887
- Place of birth: Horwich, England
- Date of death: 9 August 1944 (aged 57)
- Position: Full back

Senior career*
Years	Team	Apps	(Gls)
	Darwen	?	(?)
1909–1920	Burnley	137	(0)
	Rochdale	?	(?)
- * Club domestic league appearances and goals

Thomas F. Bamford (1887 – 9 August 1944) was an English professional footballer who played as a full back. Born in Horwich, he began his career in non-league football with Darwen before joining Burnley in 1909. He was part of the Burnley side that won the FA Cup in 1914, but then missed five years of his career due to the outbreak of the First World War. By the time league football resumed, Bamford was over 30 years of age, and found it difficult to regain his place in the team. After more than 150 first-team appearances for the club, Bamford left Burnley in 1920 to sign for Rochdale, where he ended his career.

== Biography ==
Thomas Bamford was born in the town of Horwich, Lancashire in 1887 and spent the whole of his life living in the county of his birth. He died on 9 August 1944, aged 57.

== Career ==
Bamford started his career playing as an amateur for Darwen in the Lancashire Combination. His performances attracted the attention of professional Football League Second Division club Burnley, who he joined on a free transfer in April 1909. He was originally signed as cover for the veteran fullback Fred Barron, and made his league debut for Burnley in the 3–2 victory over Blackpool on 25 March 1910. He played in the remaining eight matches of the season, but at the start of the 1910–11 campaign he found himself out of the side again thanks to the emergence of Scottish defender Thomas Splitt. Bamford made his first appearance of the season on 27 December 1910 in the defeat to Hull City, and went on to play 15 league matches in the remainder of the campaign.

Bamford was John Haworth's first choice left-back for the first 13 matches of the 1911–12 season, but again found himself left out of the team in December 1911 following the signing of David Taylor, who had been a part of Bradford City's FA Cup winning side in that year. Bamford did not appear again for Burnley until 9 September 1912 when he played left-back against Hull City at Turf Moor. Following the departure of Splitt in October 1912, Bamford found himself reinstated into the team, but at the unfamiliar right-back position. He went on to enjoy his longest run in the Burnley side, playing 24 matches in the 1912–13 season as the team achieved promotion to the Football League First Division after securing a second-placed finish in the league. Bamford also played in six FA Cup ties during the campaign as Burnley reached the semi-finals before being knocked out by Sunderland following a replay.

Following promotion to the top flight, Bamford played all 46 first-team matches in the 1913–14 as the side attained a respectable 12th-placed finish in the league. Despite starting his career as a left-back, Bamford became an established right-sided defender as Burnley built on their cup success of the previous campaign, beating South Shields, Derby County and Bolton Wanderers in the early rounds before atoning for their defeat to Sunderland in the fourth round. Bamford was selected in the starting line-up as Burnley defeated Liverpool 1–0 to win their first (and as of 2010, only) FA Cup title. The eleven players selected for that match had only ever previously played four first-team matches together and in fact never again lined up together after the Final. Bamford carried his first-place berth into the next season, again playing in every league and cup fixture in 1914–15 as Burnley finished fourth in the division, their highest league finish since 1899. On 24 April 1915, Bamford played what turned out to be his final game in a Burnley shirt, a 0–0 draw with Sheffield Wednesday at Hillsborough.

From the summer of 1915 onwards, the First World War brought competitive football to a halt in England just when Bamford was in his late twenties and at the peak of his career. He continued to play for Burnley part-time in the Wartime Football League, making 34 appearances in 1915–16 and playing a further three matches between 1917 and 1919. He served in the Army Service Corps during the war. When league football eventually resumed in August 1919, Bamford was 32 years old and could not regain his place in the Burnley team thanks to the emergence of young fullback Len Smelt. In September 1920, after failing to play a competitive match in over five years, Bamford left Burnley to join Central League outfit Rochdale on a free transfer and he played there until the end of his career.

== Honours ==
Burnley

- FA Cup: 1913–14

== Bibliography ==
- Simpson, Ray (2007). The Clarets Chronicles: The Definitive History of Burnley Football Club 1882–2007. ISBN 978-0-9557468-0-2.
- Joyce, Michael (2004). Football League Players' Records 1888–1939. SoccerData.
