= Bert Freeman =

English footballer (1885–1955)

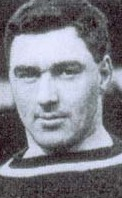

Personal information
- Full name: Bertram Clewley Freeman
- Date of birth: 1 October 1885
- Place of birth: Handsworth, England
- Date of death: 11 August 1955 (aged 69)
- Height: 5 ft 8 in (1.73 m)
- Position: Centre forward

Youth career
- Gower Street Old Boys
- Aston Manor

Senior career*
Years	Team	Apps	(Gls)
1904–1905	Aston Villa	0	(0)
1905–1908	Woolwich Arsenal	44	(21)
1908–1911	Everton	86	(63)
1911–1921	Burnley	166	(103)
1921–1922	Wigan Borough	25	(13)
1922–1924	Kettering Town		
- Kidderminster Harriers
Total		221	(110)

International career
1909–1912	England	5	(3)
- * Club domestic league appearances and goals

Bertram Clewley Freeman (1 October 1885 – 11 August 1955) was an English footballer. He played as a centre forward for clubs Woolwich Arsenal, Everton, Burnley and Wigan Borough. Freeman was one of the most prolific goal-scorers of his time, winning one First Division and two Second Division Golden Boots. He was also capped at the senior level for England.

== Career ==
=== Early days ===
Freeman was born in Handsworth, which was then in Staffordshire, and attended Gower Street School in Aston, where he started to make a name for himself as a prolific goal-scorer. He ended his schooldays with two games in which he scored seven and nine times respectively.

After moving to Gower Street Old Boys at the age of 16, he then moved on to Aston Manor where he was spotted by Aston Villa, for whom he signed professionally in April 1904. At 5 ft 8 in he was not the biggest of forwards and he failed to make an impact at Villa Park. As so he transferred to Woolwich Arsenal in November 1905.

=== Woolwich Arsenal ===
Freeman scored on his Arsenal debut on 25 November 1905 away to Nottingham Forest, scoring Arsenal's only goal in a 3–1 defeat. He also scored a brace in an FA Cup win against Manchester United that saw the club to the semi-final which they lost by 2–0 to Newcastle United. As so in his first season he scored twelve goals in 21 games for the Gunners.

Arsenal finished in seventh place in the 1906–07 season, with Freeman scoring eight goals in twelve league games. Although Arsenal again reached the FA Cup semi-finals, Freeman made no appearances in cup matches that season. By this time, he had competition for the centre forward's role with Peter Kyle, restricting his appearances; the situation continued the following season, with Freeman making a further 15 league appearances with four goals.

With Freeman unable to hold a regular place down, new manager George Morrell, in an effort to alleviate the club's debts, allowed him to join Everton in April 1908. In Freeman's biography in Arsenal Who's Who, it is argued that this was "one of the great transfer blunders of those early years". In his three seasons at Arsenal, Freeman scored a total of 24 goals in 49 appearances in league and cup matches.

=== Everton ===
An Everton director had been sent to watch Freeman play for Arsenal in 1907, and on his return was asked by the board: "Did he score any goals?" The unnamed director apparently reported back: "He scored all four of them, but he did nothing else!" Ernest Edwards, the Liverpool Echo journalist, who had christened Anfield's home end The Spion Kop, convinced the Blues that Freeman was worth taking a chance on and the 22-year-old signed for a fee of £350 in time to make his debut at the end of the 1907–08 season.

He made his debut in a goalless draw away to Liverpool on 17 April 1908 and played in the remaining four games of the season, scoring once. He soon formed a useful partnership with his former Arsenal teammate Tim Coleman, who had joined Everton a few weeks earlier. During his first full season with Everton he scored 38 goals from 37 appearances, which made him the First Division's top scorer. With Coleman contributing a further 20 goals, Everton finished in the runners-up position, seven points behind the champions, Newcastle United. In the Autumn of 1908, between 10 October and 12 December, Freeman had a run of 10 successive goal-scoring appearances – during which he struck 17 times. These included hat-tricks against Sheffield United and Sunderland. Freeman's total of 38 league goals broke the record for the most Football League goals in a season previously held by Liverpool's Sam Raybould (31 in 1902–03) and stood until broken by Ted Harper's 43 goals in 1925–26.

Freeman won his first international cap for England in the 1909 British Home Championship match against Wales on 15 March 1909. Freeman scored England's second goal in a 2–0 victory. He retained his place for the next international against Scotland on 3 April, which England also won 2–0 (both goals from George Wall) as England claimed the championship title. He also played for the Football League against the Irish League in 1909, scoring four goals.

In the 1909–10 season, Freeman was not able to score so freely with 22 league goals as Everton finished in mid-table. They did, however, have a good run in the FA Cup, with Freeman scoring four goals, including two against Coventry City in Round Four, as Everton reached the semi-final where they were put out 3–0 by Barnsley after a replay.

The following season started poorly for Freeman, and by mid-November he had lost his place in the Everton team to George Beare who had recently arrived from Blackpool. Despite an outstanding goals return – 67 goals in 94 appearances – Freeman had always struggled to impress the hierarchy at Everton, and he was allowed to leave in 1911, aged 26, as the Everton directors believed he was past his best, with his final appearance coming against his former team, Arsenal, on 11 March 1911.

=== Burnley ===
Freeman was recruited to Burnley for a fee of £800, by John Haworth who had taken over the managerial reins at Turf Moor the previous September, having been one of the founders of Accrington Stanley. At the time, Burnley were experiencing severe financial difficulties and had spent ten years in the Second Division. However, a good run in the FA Cup had helped to improve the club's finances and Haworth was able to persuade the directors to depart from their policy of only recruiting local players in an effort to alleviate the team's goal scoring problem.

He made his Burnley debut at home to Wolverhampton Wanderers on 15 April 1911. The following season, he began to repay Haworth's faith in him as the goals came on a regular basis; a 2–1 victory over Wolves on 23 December saw Freeman score his twentieth goal of the season in only the nineteenth game, and he followed this with a hat-trick in a 4–0 defeat of Glossop North End a week later. By the end of March, Freeman's goals had helped Burnley to the top of the table with a seven-point margin over third placed Derby County with five games to play and promotion seemed secured. The absence, however, of winger Dick Lindley contributed to the club only collecting three more points and Burnley missed out on promotion finishing two points behind second place Chelsea. For Freeman, however, there was the satisfaction of finishing as the league's top scorer with 32 goals from 33 appearances and returning to the England side.

He was selected for all three matches in the 1912 British Home Championship, the first of which came against Ireland on 10 February 1912 in which Freeman scored England's fourth goal in a 6–1 victory (with a hat-trick from Harold Fleming). He scored again in the next match, a 2–0 victory against Wales on 11 March and retained his place for the final match against Scotland on 23 March which ended 1–1, thus enabling England and Scotland to share the title.

In 1912–13, Freeman at first struggled to maintain his form of the previous season, but in a run of ten straight League victories between November 1912 and January 1913 Freeman scored fifteen goals, representing an emphatic return to form. Haworth was by now building a team not just to gain promotion but to secure the club's place in the top division and, having already recruited Tommy Boyle from Barnsley the previous year to strengthen the defense, he signed winger Eddie Mosscrop in September 1912, followed by the signing of three players from Gainsborough Trinity in February (following an F.A. Cup tie between the two clubs), including goalkeeper Ronnie Sewell. These players were to form the core of the Burnley side over the next few years, and all were future England internationals. By mid-February, Burnley were top of the table and Freeman scored twice to defeat First Division Middlesbrough in the third round of the cup to set up a tie at local rivals Blackburn Rovers, where a single goal from Boyle saw them through to a semi-final against Sunderland. A 0–0 draw on 29 March at Bramall Lane preceded a replay at St Andrew's which saw Burnley lose 3–2. The FA Cup run had distracted Burnley from the league, and they had slipped into second place. They were able to hold onto the runners-up position and Freeman was again the league's top scorer with 31 goals from 37 appearances as Burnley eventually secured their return to the topflight after an absence of 13 years, finishing second in the table behind Preston North End. The success of Freeman and Burnley led to calls for him to be selected again for England, but these were ignored by the England selectors who opted for George Elliott and then Harry Hampton at centre forward, and Freeman's England career ended with three goals in five appearances of which four were won with one draw.

In their first season back in the First Division, neither Freeman nor Burnley were able to replicate their form of the previous season, but neither were the club ever in danger of relegation as they finished the League season in twelfth place with Freeman scoring 16 goals from 31 appearances, a strike rate of a goal every other game. In the FA Cup, however, it was a different story as Freeman's two goals in the early rounds helped them reach a Fourth-Round tie against Sunderland. After a goalless first match, Burnley won the replay 2–1 to avenge their defeat in the previous season's semi-final. The semi-final saw them come up against Sheffield United; the first match was again goalless, and in the replay at Goodison Park, Tommy Boyle scored the goal (a long-range effort past the Sheffield keeper) that put Burnley into the FA Cup Final for the first time in their history, where they were to meet Liverpool.

The final was played at the Crystal Palace National Sports Centre on 25 April, in front of King George V, who was the first reigning monarch to attend a Cup Final. The final itself was something of an anti-climax, after the drama of the early rounds. A fierce shot on 58 minutes by Freeman gave Burnley "a narrow victory in an otherwise undistinguished match in which two teams with low positions in the League slogged it out in midfield, neither set of forwards being capable of mounting a sustained attack". Despite the lack of quality in the final, Burnley deserved the plaudits having been the first team to overcome five First Division clubs to take the trophy.

Freeman started the 1914–15 season in prolific early season form as he scored ten goals in the first eleven league games. By the end of the year, however, Freeman's goalscoring touch had deserted him and manager John Haworth even tried playing him the wing in an unsuccessful attempt to rekindle some kind of form. A late season run of good results saw the Clarets claim a final position of fourth in the table in which only three points separated the top seven teams, with Everton claiming the title.

By now, league football had been interrupted by the First World War, but Freeman was to return to Turf Moor for two further seasons after the cessation of hostilities. Although only managing 12 goals in the first post-war season, Freeman was still Burnley's top goal-scorer for the season, as Burnley finished as runners-up in the First Division, nine points behind champions West Bromwich Albion. On 21 February 1920, Freeman became the first Burnley player to score 100 League goals, in a 2–0 win at Derby County. Freeman's final goal for Burnley came on 20 March in a 2–1 victory against Sunderland.

The following season, he played in the first three matches, all of which ended in defeats, and he lost his place to Joe Anderson. He then had to sit and watch as none of the next thirty games were lost and his league career at Burnley was over. As a result, he did not receive a Championship medal despite the contributions that he had made to Burnley's success in his time with the club. He made one final appearance as a replacement for Anderson in a 3–0 FA Cup defeat at Hull City on 19 February 1921, and he joined Wigan Borough at the end of the season.

In his ten years with Burnley, he scored a total of 115 goals in 189 appearances, having helped the club achieve topflight promotion and win the only FA Cup in its history. Shortly before he left Turf Moor, a local newspaper published this tribute:

Freeman may justly be described as one of the most remarkable players of the past 20 years, a centre-forward who was a leader in deed as well as name. The modern tendency is for the leaders of attack to wait for opportunities to be provided for them. They have to be spoon fed to succeed, merely relying upon pace, weight and ability to shoot. Freeman could burst through with the best; moreover he could also engineer openings for his colleagues and was an artist with the ball at his toes.

That queer, short step of his misled many defenders and it was one of the surprises of football when in 1909 Everton decided that his playing days were over. So far from the fact did the Everton judgement prove that Freeman led Burnley to promotion and to victory in the English Cup.

He has been with the Turf Moor club for 11 years and has taken part in 300 games for them in which he has scored 174 goals – a wonderful record for a player supposed to be at the end of his career. He will be greatly missed at Turf Moor, where he made himself one of the most popular players the club has ever possessed.

=== Later career ===
He spent the 1921–22 season in the Third Division North with Wigan Borough where his 13 goals from 25 appearances made him the club's top scorer for the season. He subsequently played for Kettering Town and Kidderminster Harriers before retiring from football.

Bert Freeman died in August 1955, aged 69. His brother, Walter was also a footballer, playing for Aston Villa, Birmingham and Fulham.

== Career statistics ==
Appearances and goals by club, season and competition
Club	Season	League		FA Cup		Total	
Club	Season	Apps	Goals	Apps	Goals	Apps	Goals
Aston Villa	1904–05	0	0	0	0	0	0
Woolwich Arsenal	1905–06	17	9	4	3	21	12
Woolwich Arsenal	1906–07	12	8	0	0	12	8
Woolwich Arsenal	1907–08	15	4	1	0	16	4
Woolwich Arsenal	Total	44	21	5	3	48	24
Everton	1907–08	4	1	0	0	4	1
Everton	1908–09	37	38	1	0	38	38
Everton	1909–10	34	22	7	4	41	26
Everton	1910–11	11	2	0	0	11	2
Everton	Total	86	63	8	4	94	67
Burnley	1910–11	2	0	0	0	2	0
Burnley	1911–12	33	32	1	1	34	33
Burnley	1912–13	37	31	6	5	43	36
Burnley	1913–14	31	16	8	3	39	19
Burnley	1914–15	32	12	3	3	35	15
Burnley	1919–20	28	12	4	0	32	12
Burnley	1920–21	3	0	1	0	4	0
Burnley	Total	166	103	23	12	189	115
Wigan Borough	1921–22	25	13	0	0	25	13
Career total		321	200	36	19	357	219

== Honours ==
Burnley

- Football League Second Division runner-up: 1912–13
- FA Cup: 1913–14

England

- British Home Championship: 1909, 1912

Individual

- First Division Golden Boot: 1909
- Second Division Golden Boot: 1912 & 1913
