= Frank Birchenough =

English footballer

Personal information
- Date of birth: 11 September 1898
- Place of birth: Crewe, England
- Date of death: 19 February 1960
- Place of death: Haslington, nr. Crewe
- Position: Goalkeeper

Senior career*
Years	Team	Apps	(Gls)
1919-1920	Nantwich		
1919–1920	West Ham United	1	(0)
1920–1921	Burnley	2	(0)
1921-1922	Whitchurch		
1922-1923	Rhyl		
1923-1924	Nantwich		
- Sandbach Ramblers
- * Club domestic league appearances and goals

Frank Birchenough (born 1898) was an English professional footballer who played in the Football League as a goalkeeper for West Ham United and Burnley. Son of former Manchester United goalkeeper Herbert Birchenough.

Birchenough played non-league football with Nantwich. He played a single Second Division game for West Ham United, against Nottingham Forest on 5 April 1920.

After a spell at Burnley, where he made two appearances as part of the First Division championship-winning squad of 1920–21, he later played for Whitchurch and Rhyl before returning to Nantwich and later kept goal for Sandbach Ramblers during their 1927-28 Cheshire County League campaign.
