= Cliff Jones (English footballer) =

English footballer

Personal information
- Full name: Clifford Jones
- Date of birth: 13 December 1889
- Place of birth: Rotherham, England
- Height: 5 ft 9 1/2 in (1.77 m)
- Position: Full back

Senior career*
Years	Team	Apps	(Gls)
–1911	Rotherham Town		
1911–1912	Gainsborough Trinity	12	(0)
1912–1922	Burnley	82	(0)
1922–1923	Accrington Stanley	0	(0)
- * Club domestic league appearances and goals

Clifford Jones was an English professional footballer who played as a full back in the Football League for Gainsborough Trinity and Burnley.

== Personal life ==
Jones served as a gunner in the British Army during the First World War and saw action at Passchendaele.

== Career statistics ==
As of match played 24 October 2020

Appearances and goals by club, season and competition
Club	Season	League			National cup (Note: Includes FA Cup)		Total	
Club	Season	Division	Apps	Goals	Apps	Goals	Apps	Goals
Burnley	1913–14	First Division	5	0	0	0	5	0
Burnley	1914–15	First Division	4	0	0	0	4	0
Burnley	1919–20	First Division	19	0	0	0	19	0
Burnley	1920–21	First Division	31	0	3	0	34	0
Burnley	1921–22	First Division	14	0	0	0	14	0
Career total			73	0	3	0	76	0

== Honours ==
Burnley

- Football League First Division: 1920–21
- Football League Second Division second-place promotion: 1912–13
