= Bill Taylor (footballer, born 1886) =

English footballer

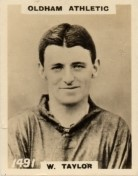
- Taylor in 1922 while at Oldham Athletic

Personal information
- Full name: William Taylor
- Date of birth: 1886
- Place of birth: Southwell, Nottinghamshire, England
- Date of death: 17 May 1966 (age 79–80)
- Place of death: Southwell, Nottinghamshire, England
- Height: 5 ft 9 in (1.75 m)
- Position: Half-back

Senior career*
Years	Team	Apps	(Gls)
1911–1912	Southwell		
1912–1913	Mansfield Mechanics		
1913–1914	Notts County	0	(0)
1914–1919	Shirebrook		
1919–1920	Burnley	17	(2)
1920–1925	Oldham Athletic	109	(1)
1925–192?	Newark Town		
- * Club domestic league appearances and goals

William Taylor (1886 – 7 May 1966) was an English footballer who played as a half-back for Southwell, Mansfield Mechanics, Notts County, Shirebrook, Burnley, Oldham Athletic, and Newark Town.

== Career ==
Taylor played for Southwell, Mansfield Mechanics, Notts County, Shirebrook, and Burnley. He played one game as a guest for Port Vale during World War II, in a 2–0 defeat to Manchester United in a Lancashire regional Section, Subsidiary Tournament match at the Old Recreation Ground on 13 April 1918. He later played for Oldham Athletic, and Newark Town.

== Career statistics ==
Appearances and goals by club, season and competition
Club	Season	League			FA Cup		Total	
Club	Season	Division	Apps	Goals	Apps	Goals	Apps	Goals
Notts County	1913–14	Second Division	0	0	0	0	0	0
Burnley	1919–20	First Division	15	2	2	0	17	2
Burnley	1920–21	First Division	2	0	0	0	2	0
Burnley	Total		17	2	2	0	19	2
Oldham Athletic	1920–21	First Division	16	0	1	0	17	0
Oldham Athletic	1921–22	First Division	36	0	2	1	38	1
Oldham Athletic	1922–23	First Division	34	1	1	0	35	1
Oldham Athletic	1923–24	Second Division	17	0	2	0	19	0
Oldham Athletic	1924–25	Second Division	6	0	0	0	6	0
Oldham Athletic	Total		109	1	6	1	115	2
Career total			126	3	8	1	134	4
