= James Lindsay (footballer) =

Scottish footballer

Personal information
- Date of birth: 16 October 1891
- Place of birth: Johnstone, Scotland
- Date of death: 1951 (aged 59–60)
- Place of death: Glasgow, Scotland
- Height: 5 ft 5 in (1.65 m)
- Position: Inside forward

Senior career*
Years	Team	Apps	(Gls)
1911–1914	Clyde	8	(2)
1912–1914	→ Glentoran (loan)		
1914–1923	Burnley	74	(18)
1916–1918	→ St Mirren (loan)	60	(13)
1923–1924	Llanelli		
1924–1925	Larne		
1925	Accrington Stanley	5	(0)
1925–1926	Bathgate	14	(1)
- * Club domestic league appearances and goals

James J. Lindsay (16 October 1891 – 1951) was a Scottish professional footballer who played as an inside forward.

Lindsay signed for Burnley in 1914 after club officials observed his impressive performances during the Vienna Cup whilst on loan to Irish club Glentoran, who won the tournament. He was a member of the Clarets squad that won the 1920–21 Football League championship, contributing 8 appearances and 2 goals.

His elder brother William was also a footballer; they were teammates at Glentoran.
