= Charlie Bates (footballer) =

English footballer

Personal information
- Full name: Charles Bates
- Date of birth: 1889
- Place of birth: West Bromwich, England
- Date of death: 20 March 1937 (aged 47–48)
- Place of death: Burnley, England
- Position: Centre forward

Senior career*
Years	Team	Apps	(Gls)
- Darlington
1910–1912	Burnley	15	(5)
- * Club domestic league appearances and goals

Charles Bates (1889 – 20 March 1937) was an English professional footballer who played as a centre forward. After his retirement from football, Bates qualified as a chiropodist.

As a youth, Bates played local football in the Birmingham leagues. He later had a spell with Darlington, before joining Football League Second Division side Burnley in May 1910. He made his debut for the club on 3 December 1910 in the 2–1 win over Leicester Fosse at Turf Moor, in place of Tommy Mayson, and kept his place in the team for the next two matches. After four games out of the team Bates was selected for the first match of 1911, away at Glossop, and scored his first League goal in the 1–1 draw. He scored twice in the following game, securing a 2–1 victory against Huddersfield Town with a penalty kick four minutes from time. During the remainder of the season Bates made sporadic appearances for Burnley; his two goals in the 5–3 win against Stockport County on 18 March 1911 meant he ended the campaign with a record of 5 goals in 13 games.

Hampered by injury, Bates played just two first-team matches for Burnley during the 1911–12 season. His final league appearance for the club came on 9 December 1911 in the 5–1 win away at Leeds City. Following his retirement from professional football in 1912, he was appointed assistant trainer at Burnley, and in 1919 he was promoted to senior trainer after the departure of Ernest Edwards. Bates acted as trainer to the England national team for the 1–2 defeat to Wales at Turf Moor on 28 November 1927. He left Burnley in 1934, later becoming trainer at Newport County, before returning to live in Burnley.

== Personal life ==
Bates was a reservist in the South Staffordshire Regiment prior to the First World War. At the outbreak of the war, he was called up and while serving as a private was taken prisoner of war by German forces at Ypres on 31 August 1914. During his imprisonment, he was held in Gottingen.

== Career statistics ==
Club	Season	League		FA Cup		Total	
Club	Season	Apps	Goals	Apps	Goals	Apps	Goals
Burnley	1910–11	13	5	0	0	13	5
Burnley	1911–12	2	0	0	0	2	0
Total		15	5	0	0	15	5
