= Walter Weaver (footballer) =

English footballer

Personal information
- Full name: Walter Weaver
- Date of birth: 9 November 1898
- Place of birth: Birkenhead, England
- Date of death: 1965 (aged 66–67)
- Height: 5 ft 9 in (1.75 m)
- Position: Winger

Senior career*
Years	Team	Apps	(Gls)
1919–1925	Burnley	106	(15)
1925–1926	Everton	18	(3)
1926–1928	Wolverhampton Wanderers	43	(11)
Total		167	(29)
- * Club domestic league appearances and goals

Walter Weaver (9 November 1898 – 1965) was an English professional footballer who played as a winger.
