= Billy Nesbitt =

English footballer

Personal information
- Full name: William Nesbitt
- Date of birth: 22 November 1891
- Place of birth: Todmorden, England
- Date of death: 11 January 1972 (age 80)
- Place of death: Halifax, England
- Height: 5 ft 7 1/2 in (1.71 m)
- Position: Winger

Senior career*
Years	Team	Apps	(Gls)
1911–1923	Burnley	172	(19)
1923–1924	Bristol City	26	(0)
1924	Clapton Orient	0	(0)
- * Club domestic league appearances and goals

William Nesbitt (22 November 1891 – 11 January 1972) was an English professional footballer who played as a winger. Nesbitt started his football career, aged 16, with his local side, Cornholme, before later joining Portsmouth Rovers. In 1911, he was signed by Burnley manager John Haworth, where he would make almost 200 first-team appearances. Nesbitt was first signed as an amateur, but Haworth gained permission for him to be released from his apprenticeship as a wood turner. With Burnley, Nesbitt won both the FA Cup (1914) and Football League First Division (1920–21). He moved to Bristol City in 1923 and had a short spell with Clapton Orient, but in 1924, he was forced to retire from the professional game through injury.

Nesbitt was acutely deaf his whole life. At Burnley, his teammates communicated with him using a variety of methods, including shirt-pulling, hand signalling and lip-reading. When his football career ended, he opened a tobacconist and sweet shop in Paddington, Central London. He returned to Todmorden, and in 1972, he died in hospital in Halifax.

== Honours ==
Burnley

- FA Cup: 1913–14
