= George Thompson (footballer, born 1895) =

English footballer

Personal information
- Date of birth: 1895
- Place of birth: Ashington, England
- Height: 5 ft 10 in (1.78 m)
- Position: Full back

Senior career*
Years	Team	Apps	(Gls)
1914–1921	Burnley	5	(0)
1921–1923	Rotherham County	37	(0)
1923–1926	Ashington	59	(2)
1926–1928	Pegswood United		
1928–1929	Ashington	1	(0)
Total		102	(2)
- * Club domestic league appearances and goals

George Thompson (1895 – after 1928) was an English professional footballer who played as a full back.

Born in Ashington, he began his career with Football League First Division side Burnley and made five league appearances for the club in the 1919–20 season, as the side achieved a second-placed finish in the league. He played no matches in the following season as the Clarets were crowned champions of England, and moved to Rotherham County in the summer of 1921. He spent two seasons in Rotherham, playing a total of 37 league games for the club before transferring to Football League Third Division North outfit Ashington, his hometown club. In three seasons, he played 59 matches in the league before leaving the club at the end of the 1925–26 campaign.

Thompson then spent two seasons in non-league football with Pegswood United, before re-joining Ashington in 1928. In his second spell with the club he made just one league appearance as the side finished bottom of their division, and failed re-election to the league at the end of the 1928–1929 season.

== Bibliography ==
- Joyce, Michael (2004). Football League Players' Records 1888-1939. SoccerData.
- Simpson, Ray (2007). The Clarets Chronicles. Burnley Football Club. p. 494. ISBN 978-0-9557468-0-2.
