= Patrick Norris (footballer) =

English footballer

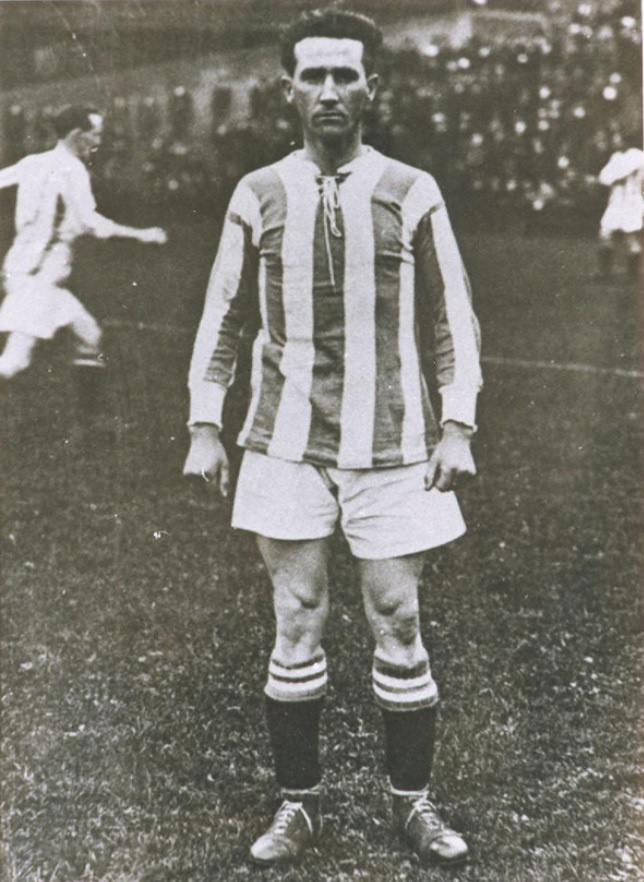
- Patrick Norris, Stockport County

Personal information
- Full name: Patrick Norris
- Place of birth: Broughton, England
- Position: Inside forward

Senior career*
Years	Team	Apps	(Gls)
	Salford	?	(?)
1919–1920	Burnley	2	(0)
1920–1921	Stockport County	5	(1)
- * Club domestic league appearances and goals

Patrick Norris was an English professional footballer who played as an inside forward.
