= George Douglas (footballer) =

English footballer

Personal information
- Full name: George Harold Douglas
- Date of birth: 18 August 1893
- Place of birth: Stepney, England
- Date of death: 1979 (aged 85–86)
- Height: 5 ft 6 in (1.68 m)
- Position: Outside forward

Senior career*
Years	Team	Apps	(Gls)
1912–1920	Leicester Fosse	127	(10)
1920–1922	Burnley	5	(0)
1922–1926	Oldham Athletic	134	(8)
1926–1928	Bristol Rovers	45	(5)
1928–1930	Tunbridge Wells Rangers		
- * Club domestic league appearances and goals

George Harold Douglas (18 August 1893 – 1979) was an English professional association footballer who played as a winger. He played over 300 matches and scored 23 goals in the Football League. He moved into non-league football in 1928 as player/manager of Tunbridge Wells Rangers until 1930, when he moved to Dover United.
