= Reuben Grice =

English footballer

Personal information
- Date of birth: 1886
- Place of birth: Ruddington, England
- Date of death: 1967 (aged 80–81)
- Position: Winger

Senior career*
Years	Team	Apps	(Gls)
1910–1912	Notts County	4	(0)
1912–1914	Rotherham County		
1914–1915	Burnley	2	(0)
- * Club domestic league appearances and goals

Reuben Grice (1886–1967) was an English professional footballer who played as a winger.
