= Wally Dickinson =

English footballer (1895–1984)

Personal information
- Full name: Walter Dickinson
- Date of birth: 22 December 1895
- Place of birth: Sheffield, England
- Date of death: 1984 (aged 88–89)
- Position: Defender

Senior career*
Years	Team	Apps	(Gls)
1919–1922	Bradford Park Avenue	113	(0)
1922–1923	Sheffield Wednesday	7	(0)
1923–1930	Swindon Town	230	(20)
Total		350	(20)
- * Club domestic league appearances and goals

Walter Dickinson (22 December 1895 – 1984) was an English professional footballer who played as a defender. In a playing career spanning 350 league matches, Dickinson played for Bradford Park Avenue, Sheffield Wednesday and Swindon Town.
