= Vienna Cup (association football) =

Football competition in Austria

The Vienna Cup was a football competition held in Vienna, Austria and organized by Vienna Football Club in 1914. It was only played once due to the outbreak of World War I, and won by Glentoran.

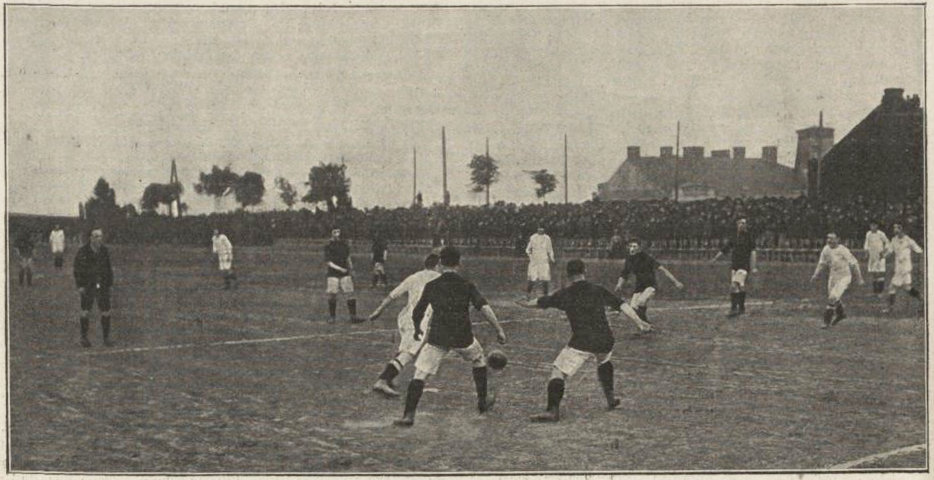
Vienna XI (white) - Glentoran (1914)

Glentoran, as winners of the Irish Cup in 1914, embarked on a tour of Central Europe in May and June of that year. After losing 4–3 to Deutscher FC in front of a crowd of 3000 in Prague on 21 May, only a few days after winning the Irish City Cup on 16 May. Prager Tagblatt considered the match the "best ever" in Prague. Glentoran defeated Hertha Berlin on their ground 4–1 on 23 May.

Glentoran, the first ever Irish side to play in Vienna, drew 1–1 with a Vienna Select XI on 27 May at Hohe Warte stadium. A second match was played against the Vienna Select XI side on 30 May on the same location which Glentoran won 5–0. The 30 May match was played for the Vienna Cup.

Glentoran played two further times on their tour, following up the Vienna Cup win with a 3–0 victory against a combination of Pozsonyi FC and Budapesti AC in Pressburg (Bratislava) on 31 May before losing 7–0 against a Hungarian XI on 1 June.

FA Cup winners, Burnley and Scottish Cup winners, Celtic also participated in concurrent European tours, including a game against each other in Budapest on 21 May for the similarly titled Budapest Cup. The match ended in a 1–1 draw, with a replay at Turf Moor won 2–1 by Celtic on 1 September. Neither side faced Glentoran during their tours.

== Sources ==
- www.glentoran-fc.co.uk
- France, Roy (2001). Glentoran: A Complete Record.
- Robinson, Sam (2020). One Saturday Before The War.
