= Benny Cross =

English footballer

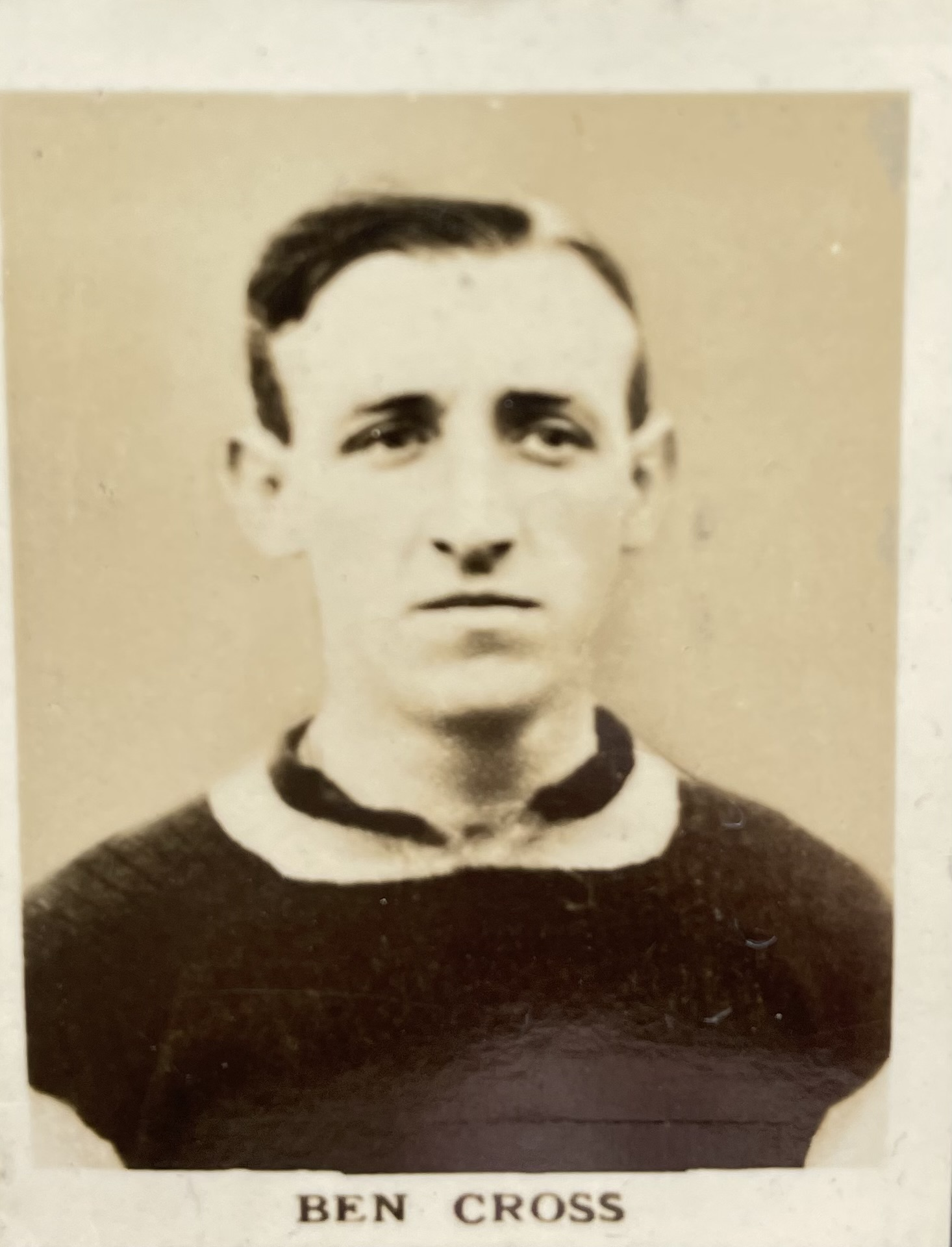

Personal information
- Full name: Benjamin Cross
- Date of birth: 23 August 1898
- Place of birth: Birkenhead, England
- Date of death: 1986 (aged 86 or 87)
- Height: 5 ft 6 in (1.68 m)
- Position: Inside left

Senior career*
Years	Team	Apps	(Gls)
1920–1927	Burnley	237	(57)
- * Club domestic league appearances and goals

Benjamin Cross (23 August 1898 – 1986) was an English professional footballer who played as an inside forward for Burnley. He stood 5 ft 6ins and weighed 9st 10 lbs.

== Early life ==
Cross was born in Birkenhead and played for junior teams there. During the First World War he played for Liverpool, and then joined Burnley which at that time were one of the best UK teams.

== Career ==
He forged a famous attacking partnership with Weaver, and captained England schoolboys against Scotland at the international level, going on to play for England. He held an English league championship medal for 1920–21 season.
