= George Halley (footballer) =

Scottish footballer

Personal information
- Full name: George Halley
- Date of birth: 29 October 1887
- Place of birth: Lanark, Scotland
- Date of death: 18 December 1941 (aged 54)
- Place of death: Burnley, England
- Height: 5 ft 9 1/2 in (1.77 m)
- Positions: Right half; left back

Senior career*
Years	Team	Apps	(Gls)
–1907	Glenbuck Cherrypickers		
1907–1911	Kilmarnock	92	(7)
1911–1913	Bradford (Park Avenue)	62	(8)
1913–1922	Burnley	137	(4)
1922–1924	Southend United	21	(2)
–1930	Bacup Borough		

International career
1910	Scottish League XI	1	(0)
- * Club domestic league appearances and goals

George Halley (29 October 1887 – 18 December 1941) was a Scottish professional footballer who made 220 appearances as a right half in the Football League for Burnley, Bradford (Park Avenue) and Southend United. He also played in the Scottish League for Kilmarnock and represented the Scottish League XI.

== Club career ==
A right half, Halley began his senior career with Scottish League Division One club Kilmarnock in 1907 and moved to England in 1911, where, either side of the First World War, he made 220 appearances in the Football League for Burnley, Bradford (Park Avenue) and Southend United. While with Burnley, he was a part of the teams that won the 1913–14 FA Cup and the 1920–21 First Division title. Halley's professional career ended in 1924.

== Representative career ==
Halley was capped by the Scottish League XI in 1910. During his long spell in England, he was selected for the Home Scots v Anglo-Scots international trial on three occasions (1913, 1914, 1922), without it leading to a full cap.

== Personal life ==
Halley served in the British Army prior to the First World War. He served as a sapper in the Royal Engineers during the war and saw action in France and Mesopotamia, before being posted to India in 1919. After his retirement from football, Halley worked as a plasterer and studied at Ruskin College, Oxford. He died at Victoria Hospital, Burnley on 18 December 1941.

== Career statistics ==
Appearances and goals by club, season and competition
Club	Season	League			National Cup		Other		Total	
Club	Season	Division	Apps	Goals	Apps	Goals	Apps	Goals	Apps	Goals
Kilmarnock	1907–08	Scottish Division One	11	0	0	0	—		11	0
Kilmarnock	1908–09	Scottish Division One	28	2	1	0	—		29	2
Kilmarnock	1909–10	Scottish Division One	29	3	2	0	—		31	3
Kilmarnock	1910–11	Scottish Division One	24	2	1	0	—		25	2
Kilmarnock	Total		92	7	4	0	—		96	7
Burnley	1914–15	First Division	10	0	0	0	—		10	0
Career total			102	7	4	0	0	0	106	7

== Honours ==
Burnley

- Football League First Division: 1920–21
- FA Cup: 1913–14
