= Tom Brophy =

English footballer

Personal information
- Full name: Thomas Brophy
- Place of birth: St Helens, England
- Height: 5 ft 7 1/2 in (1.71 m)
- Position: Full back

Senior career*
Years	Team	Apps	(Gls)
1920–1921	Burnley	3	(0)
1921–1923	St Helens Town	?	(?)
1923–1927	Aberdare Athletic	132	(5)
1927–1930	Southend United	42	(0)
- * Club domestic league appearances and goals

Thomas Brophy was an English professional footballer who played as a full back for a number of Football League clubs in the 1920s.
