= Richard Cragg =

English footballer (1891–1978)

Personal information
- Full name: Richard Hartley Cragg
- Date of birth: 21 January 1891
- Place of birth: Burnley, England
- Date of death: 1978 (aged 87)
- Place of death: West Lancashire, Lancashire
- Position: Centre forward

Senior career*
Years	Team	Apps	(Gls)
1919–1920	Burnley	15	(5)
1920–1921	Stockport County	21	(3)
1921–1922	Accrington Stanley	6	(0)
- * Club domestic league appearances and goals

Richard Hartley Cragg (21 January 1891 – 1978) was an English professional association footballer who played as a centre forward.
