= William Husband (footballer) =

Scottish footballer

Personal information
- Full name: William Husband
- Place of birth: Kilmarnock, Scotland
- Position: Winger

Senior career*
Years	Team	Apps	(Gls)
1909–1912	St Mirren	80	(10)
1912–1914	Burnley	39	(7)
- Hamilton Academical
- * Club domestic league appearances and goals

William Husband (born 1 January 1890) was a Scottish professional footballer who played as a winger.
