= Len Moorwood =

English footballer

Personal information
- Full name: Thomas Leonard Moorwood
- Date of birth: 21 September 1888
- Place of birth: Wednesbury, England
- Date of death: 1976 (aged 87 or 88)
- Height: 5 ft 9 3/4 in (1.77 m)
- Position: Goalkeeper

Senior career*
Years	Team	Apps	(Gls)
1910–1920	West Bromwich Albion	30	(0)
1920–1923	Burnley	18	(0)
1923–1924	Weymouth	?	(?)
1924–1925	Blackpool	0	(0)
	Blackheath	?	(?)
- * Club domestic league appearances and goals

Thomas Leonard Moorwood (21 September 1888 – 1976) was an English professional footballer who played as a goalkeeper.
