= Thomas Splitt =

Scottish footballer

Personal information
- Place of birth: Lochgelly, Scotland
- Position: Full back

Senior career*
Years	Team	Apps	(Gls)
- Dunfermline Athletic
- Cowdenbeath
1909–1912	Burnley	47	(0)
- Halifax Town
- Nelson
- * Club domestic league appearances and goals

Thomas Splitt was a Scottish professional footballer who played as a full back.
