= Joe Anderson (Scottish footballer) =

Scottish footballer

Personal information
- Full name: Joseph Anderson
- Date of birth: 1895
- Place of birth: Bishopton, Scotland
- Date of death: 1959 (aged 63-64)
- Position: Centre forward

Senior career*
Years	Team	Apps	(Gls)
1914–1916	Vale of Leven	11	(8)
1915–1919	Airdrieonians	15	(6)
1919–1920	Dumbarton Harp		
1919–1920	Clydebank	33	(31)
1919–1923	Burnley	121	(64)
1923–1926	Clydebank	58	(36)
1926–1927	Vale of Leven		
- * Club domestic league appearances and goals

Joseph Anderson (1895–1959) was a Scottish professional footballer who played as a centre forward. During his career he played in the English Football League with Burnley, being part of the squad who won the 1920–21 Football League championship, as well as being on the books at several Scottish teams, primarily Clydebank.
