= Teddy Hodgson =

English footballer

Personal information
- Full name: Edward Hodgson
- Date of birth: 1885
- Place of birth: Chorley, England
- Date of death: 4 August 1919 (aged 33)
- Place of death: Whalley, England
- Position: Inside forward

Senior career*
Years	Team	Apps	(Gls)
–1911	Chorley		
1911–1919	Burnley	120	(53)

International career
1914	Football League XI	1	(0)
- * Club domestic league appearances and goals

Edward Hodgson (1885 – 4 August 1919) was an English professional footballer who played as an inside forward.

He originally played non-league football with his hometown club Chorley before joining Second Division side Burnley in 1911 at the age of 25. He won the FA Cup with the club in 1914. Hodgson went on to make 137 appearances for Burnley, scoring 62 goals.

He fought serving with the Manchester Regiment, reaching rank of sergeant, during the First World War, but still represented Burnley as a wartime guest player, scoring 39 goals in 62 matches.

Hodgson contracted a kidney problem while on service and died at Whalley Military Hospital on 4 August 1919. He was buried at Burnley Cemetery.

== Honours ==
Burnley

- FA Cup: 1913–14
