= Max Seeburg =

German footballer (1884–1972)

Personal information
- Full name: Max Paul Seeburg
- Date of birth: 19 September 1884
- Place of birth: Leipzig, German Empire
- Date of death: 24 January 1972 (aged 87)
- Place of death: Reading, England
- Position: Right half

Senior career*
Years	Team	Apps	(Gls)
1906–1907	Chelsea	0	(0)
1907–1909	Tottenham Hotspur	16	(5)
1909–1910	Leyton		
1910–1911	Burnley	17	(0)
1911	Grimsby Town	20	(0)
1911–1912	Reading		
Total		38	(0)
- * Club domestic league appearances and goals

Max Paul Seeburg (19 September 1884 – 24 January 1972) was a German footballer who played in England for Chelsea, Tottenham Hotspur, Burnley, Grimsby Town and Reading between 1906 and 1912. Seeburg became the first European-born foreigner to play in England.

== Biography ==
Born in Leipzig, Seeburg moved to London in 1886, at the age of two. His first professional club was Chelsea, who he joined in 1906. He did not play a competitive match for the West London side, and two years later moved across the city to join Tottenham Hotspur. Seeburg's first and only league match for Tottenham was on 26 September 1908, in a 1–0 away defeat to Hull City in the Second Division. He moved to Leyton in the following month.

After a season at Leyton, Seeburg left London and spent the 1910–11 season back in the Second Division with Burnley. After a spell at Grimsby Town later that year, he joined Reading, where he retired in 1912. He settled and ran a pub in Reading. After a brief comeback in February 1914, he was briefly arrested a few weeks after the outbreak of the First World War because of his German origins, he had not been naturalized, and sent to an internment camp in Newbury. Because of his good relations with the local authorities, he was released after about a week, but had lost his job as a pub manager in the meantime. Seeburg later got back into the catering trade and ran a number of pubs

Seeburg died in Reading in 1972.
