= George Richardson (footballer, born 1901) =

English footballer

Personal information
- Full name: George William Richardson
- Date of birth: 1901
- Place of birth: East Rainton, England
- Height: 5 ft 9 in (1.75 m)
- Position: Wing half

Youth career
- Horden Athletic

Senior career*
Years	Team	Apps	(Gls)
1921–1923	Burnley	9	(5)
1923–1924	Derby County	0	(0)
1924–1928	Hartlepools United	106	(13)
1928–1930	Newport County	42	(13)
	Aldershot	?	(?)
- * Club domestic league appearances and goals

George William Richardson (1901–unknown) was an English professional footballer who played as a wing-half.
