= Len Smelt =

English footballer (1883–1933)

Personal information
- Full name: Leonard Smelt
- Date of birth: 7 December 1883
- Place of birth: Rotherham, England
- Date of death: 8 February 1933 (aged 49)
- Height: 5 ft 9 1/2 in (1.77 m)
- Position: Full back

Senior career*
Years	Team	Apps	(Gls)
1908–1909	Gainsborough Trinity	7	(1)
- Sutton Junction
- Rotherham Town
- Chesterfield
- Gainsborough Trinity
1919–1926	Burnley	229	(0)
1926–1927	Barrow	37	(0)
1927–?	Frickley		
- Hurst
- * Club domestic league appearances and goals

Leonard Smelt (7 December 1883 – 8 February 1933) was an English professional footballer who played as a full back.

Smelt's final game for Burnley, the 'Clarets' was on 18 April 1925 at the age of 41 years and 132 days.
