= John McMaster (footballer, born 1893) =

Scottish footballer

Personal information
- Date of birth: 4 January 1893
- Place of birth: Port Glasgow, Scotland
- Date of death: 27 December 1954 (aged 61)
- Place of death: Greenock, Scotland
- Positions: Left half; centre half

Senior career*
| Years | Team | Apps | (Gls) |
| – | Clydebank Juniors | | |
| 1913–1923 | Celtic | 203 | (6) |
| 1916–1917 | → Fulham (loan) | | |
| 1922 | → Birmingham (loan) | | |
| 1923 | → Ayr United (loan) | 0 | (0) |
| 1923–1925 | Queen of the South | 40 | (1) |
- * Club domestic league appearances and goals

John McMaster (4 January 1893 – 27 December 1954) was a Scottish footballer who played for Celtic and Queen of the South, as a left half or centre half. He won the Scottish Football League title with Celtic in the 1913–14, 1914–15, 1915–16 and 1921–22 seasons, the Scottish Cup in 1914, two Glasgow Cups and three Charity Cups.

He also fought in World War I serving with the Royal Army Service Corps, and was wounded in France in 1918. He was selected for the British Army football team in a 1917 fundraising match, and had played in the Glasgow FA's annual challenge match against Sheffield in 1914, but received no further representative honours.
