= Billy Watson (footballer, born 1890) =

English footballer

Personal information
- Full name: William Watson
- Birth name: Richard Watson
- Date of birth: 11 September 1890
- Place of birth: Birkdale, England
- Date of death: 1 September 1955 (aged 64)
- Height: 5 ft 8 1/2 in (1.74 m)
- Position: Wing half

Senior career*
Years	Team	Apps	(Gls)
1907–1908	Southport Central		
1908–1925	Burnley	346	(18)
- → Fulham (guest)
- → Southport Central (guest)
1925–1926	Accrington Stanley	6	(0)
1926–1927	Blackburn Rovers	0	(0)
Total		352	(18)

International career
1913–1919	England	3	(0)
- * Club domestic league appearances and goals

William Watson (born Richard Watson; 11 September 1890 – 1 September 1955) was an English international footballer who played as a wing half in The Football League either side of World War I.

He made over 340 league appearances for Burnley, and was capped on three occasions by England.

Outside football he was an ironmonger and also worked in his father's trade of painter and decorator. In World War I he served with the Royal Army Service Corps and was later a local councillor for the Liberal Party in his hometown of Southport.

== Honours ==
Burnley

- FA Cup: 1913–14
