= Alf Basnett =

English footballer

Personal information
- Date of birth: 10 April 1893
- Place of birth: St Helens, England
- Date of death: 24 June 1966 (aged 73)
- Place of death: Burnley, Lancashire, England
- Height: 5 ft 7 in (1.70 m)
- Position: Wing half

Senior career*
Years	Team	Apps	(Gls)
1919–1926	Burnley	147	(5)
1926–1929	Lincoln City	89	(6)
1929–1930	Ballymena	19	(1)
- Hereford United
- Nelson
- * Club domestic league appearances and goals

Alfred Basnett (10 April 1893 – 24 June 1966) was an English professional footballer who played as a wing half.

After he retired, he operated a hostel in Burnley.
