= Dick Lindley =

English footballer

Richard Lindley
Personal information
- Place of birth: Bolton, England
- Position: Inside right

Senior career*
Years	Team	Apps	(Gls)
- Burnley
1920–1921	Bradford City	15	(4)
- Coventry City
- * Club domestic league appearances and goals

Richard Lindley was an English professional footballer who played as an inside right.

== Career ==
Born in Bolton, Lindley played for Burnley, Bradford City and Coventry City During his time with Bradford City he made 15 appearances in the Football League, scoring four goals.

== Honours ==
Burnley

- FA Cup: 1913–14

== Sources ==
- Frost, Terry (1988). Bradford City A Complete Record 1903-1988. Breedon Books Sport. ISBN 0-907969-38-0.
