= Eddie Mosscrop =

English footballer (1892–1980)

Personal information
- Date of birth: 16 June 1892
- Place of birth: Southport, England
- Date of death: 14 March 1980 (aged 87)
- Height: 5 ft 6 1/2 in (1.69 m)
- Position: Outside left

Senior career*
Years	Team	Apps	(Gls)
1912–1922	Burnley	176	(19)

International career
1914	England	2	(0)
- * Club domestic league appearances and goals

Edwin Mosscrop (16 June 1892 – 14 March 1980) was an English professional footballer who played as a winger. He won two caps for the England national football team in 1914 and was part of the Burnley side which won the FA Cup against Liverpool in 1914. He served with the British Army in Salonika during the First World War, before returning to Burnley in 1919. He was forced to retire from professional football in November 1922 due to a serious illness and subsequently returned to his hometown of Southport to work as a schoolteacher.

He was the last surviving pre-World War I England international, dying some 65 years after senior football was suspended following the outbreak of World War I, although he was outlived by a number of pre-World War I players to have seen Football League action; including some who survived in the 1990s.

Eddie was inducted into the Southport FC Hall of Fame on 16 November 2019. Grandson Gary Mosscrop accepted the award on behalf of his family from club historian Michael Braham.

== Honours ==
Burnley

- FA Cup: 1913–14
