= John Haworth =

English football manager (1876–1924)

Personal information
- Date of birth: 8 May 1876
- Place of birth: Accrington, England
- Date of death: 4 December 1924 (aged 48)
- Place of death: Burnley, England
- Position: Defender

Senior career*
Years	Team	Apps	(Gls)
- Meadow Bank

Managerial career
- 1897–1910: Accrington Stanley
- 1910–1924: Burnley
- * Club domestic league appearances and goals

John Haworth (8 May 1876 – 4 December 1924) was an English football manager. After playing amateur football as a youth, he was appointed manager of Accrington Stanley in 1897. He was in charge of the team for 13 years, leading them to two Lancashire Combination titles, before moving to nearby Burnley in July 1910. His 14-year spell as secretary-manager of Burnley was highly successful and guided the team to an FA Cup victory and a Football League championship. Haworth is the only Burnley manager to date to have won the FA Cup.

== Personal life ==
Haworth was born in Accrington, Lancashire on 8 May 1876 and was the nephew of England international George Haworth. He died of pneumonia on 4 December 1924 aged 48.

== Managerial career ==
=== Accrington Stanley ===
As a teenager, Haworth played amateur football for local club Meadow Bank, where he later became secretary. In 1897, he merged the club with North East Lancashire Combination side Accrington Stanley and became a member of the Accrington Stanley committee. Later the same year, he was named secretary of the club. At the time, club secretaries were in charge of first-team duties such as coaching and signing players. Under the stewardship of Howarth, Accrington Stanley were transformed into one of the foremost non-league clubs in Lancashire, winning the Lancashire Combination in the 1902–03 season. The following campaign, the team finished as runners-up before again claiming the league title in the 1905–06 season. He went on to manage the club for 13 years before leaving in the summer of 1910.

=== Burnley ===
Haworth was appointed secretary–manager of Football League Second Division side Burnley in July 1910. During his first months in charge, he signed Burnley's first overseas player, German defender Max Seeburg. Soon afterwards, he helped change the colour of Burnley's strip to claret and blue, reportedly because he considered the previous green kit to be unlucky.. Towards the close of the 1910–11 season, Haworth pulled off his first major signing when he persuaded England centre forward Bert Freeman to join the club from Everton. The following season, Haworth guided the team to a third-placed finish in the Second Division, narrowly missing out on promotion. In the 1912–13 campaign, Burnley reached the semi-finals of the FA Cup before losing to Sunderland after a replay. That year, the team finished second in the league to gain promotion to the First Division.

In the club's first season in the top-flight of English football since 1900, he led the side to third place in the league, just three points off the title. He also guided the team to an unprecedented FA Cup run, where they conceded only four goals in eight matches. Haworth's team secured a 1–0 victory over Liverpool in the final, making him the only manager to date to have won the FA Cup with Burnley. The team ended the 1914–15 season in fourth place in the First Division before football in England was interrupted for four years by the First World War. Upon the return to competitive football, Burnley finished runners-up in the league. The 1920–21 season started disappointingly for the side, but he eventually led the team to a 30-match unbeaten run to become champions of England for the first time. A third-placed finish followed in 1922, but the team's league form fell away thereafter and they could only achieve relatively mediocre finishes in the next two campaigns. On 4 December 1924, he became the second successive Burnley manager to die while in office when he died of pneumonia.

== Honours ==
Burnley

- Football League champions: 1920–21
- Football League runners-up: 1919–20
- FA Cup winners: 1914

== See also ==
- List of English football championship winning managers
