= Tommy Boyle (footballer, born 1886) =

English footballer (1886–1940)

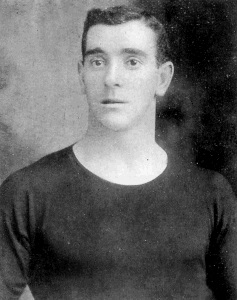
- Boyle c. 1909

Personal information
- Full name: Thomas William Boyle
- Date of birth: 29 January 1886
- Place of birth: Hoyland, England
- Date of death: 5 January 1940 (aged 53)
- Place of death: Whittingham, England
- Height: 5 ft 6 1/2 in (1.69 m)
- Position: Half back

Youth career
- Hoyland Star
- Elsecar Athletic

Senior career*
Years	Team	Apps	(Gls)
1906–1912	Barnsley	160	(17)
1912–1923	Burnley	210	(36)
1923–1924	Wrexham	7	(0)
Total		377	(53)

International career
1912–1919	Football League XI	4	(1)
1913	England	1	(0)
1916	England (wartime)	1	(0)
- * Club domestic league appearances and goals

Thomas William Boyle (29 January 1886 – 5 January 1940) was an English footballer, primarily associated with Burnley. He was the only player to have captained a Burnley team in a winning FA Cup Final.

== Career ==
Boyle was born in the village of Hoyland in Yorkshire in 1886. He started his career at Barnsley. In 1912 Boyle crossed the Pennines to sign for Burnley for what was then a club record fee of £1,150.

He was described as a great header of the ball, an excellent passer with great leadership qualities, and as being one of the best players ever to play for Burnley. Having lifted the FA Cup in 1914, he then became the first Burnley captain to lift the League Championship Trophy as Burnley won the 1920–21 title.

By then, he was 33 and his career was coming to an end. That season was to be his last full season in the first team. He made his last appearance for Burnley during the 1921–22 season, and after a further year playing in the reserves he signed for Wrexham, where he ended his playing career.

After his playing career, he had a spell coaching in Germany.

He won only one England cap against Ireland in Belfast in 1913. He also played in four representative matches for the Football League.

== Personal life ==
Pre-war Boyle was a coal miner by trade. He served as a gunner in the Royal Field Artillery during the First World War and was wounded in 1917. After the war, Boyle worked as a landlord, but was committed to a psychiatric hospital in 1930. He died at Whittingham Hospital, Lancashire, ten years later, and was buried in an unmarked grave in Hoyland.

== Honours ==
Burnley

- FA Cup: 1913–14
