= 1913–14 Liverpool F.C. season =

English football club season

Liverpool F.C
1913–14 season
- Manager: Tom Watson
- Stadium: Anfield
- Football League: 16th
- FA Cup: Runners-up
- Top goalscorer: League: Tom Miller (16); All: Tom Miller (20)

The 1913–14 Liverpool F.C. season was the 22nd season in existence for Liverpool. They reached their first FA Cup Final, finishing runners-up to Burnley.

== Squad statistics ==
=== Appearances and goals ===
No.	Pos	Nat	Player	Total		Division 1		F.A. Cup	
No.	Pos	Nat	Player	Apps	Goals	Apps	Goals	Apps	Goals
	FW	(England) ENG	Billy Banks	9	4	9	4	0	0
	FW	(Scotland) SCO	John Bovill	3	0	3	0	0	0
	GK	(Scotland) SCO	Kenny Campbell	42	0	34	0	8	0
	DF	(Scotland) SCO	Bob Crawford	7	1	7	1	0	0
	FW	(Scotland) SCO	Jimmy Dawson	14	3	13	3	1	0
	MF	(Scotland) SCO	Tom Fairfoul	46	0	38	0	8	0
	MF	(Scotland) SCO	Bob Ferguson	43	1	36	0	7	1
	MF	(England) ENG	Arthur Goddard	11	0	11	0	0	0
	FW	(Scotland) SCO	Tommy Gracie	13	3	13	3	0	0
	DF	(England) ENG	Frank Grayer	1	0	1	0	0	0
	MF	(England) ENG	Ralph Holden	1	0	1	0	0	0
	MF	(Ireland) EIR	Billy Lacey	43	11	35	6	8	5
	DF	(England) ENG	Ephraim Longworth	34	0	27	0	7	0
	MF	(England) ENG	Harry Lowe	34	0	29	0	5	0
	FW	(Scotland) SCO	Bob McDougall	7	1	6	1	1	0
	DF	(Scotland) SCO	Donald McKinlay	22	1	16	1	6	0
	FW	(England) ENG	Arthur Metcalf	15	3	10	2	5	1
	FW	(Scotland) SCO	Tom Miller	40	20	32	16	8	4
	FW	(Scotland) SCO	Jimmy Nicholl	19	5	14	3	5	2
	FW	(England) ENG	Jack Parkinson	8	1	6	1	2	0
	DF	(Wales) WAL	Ernie Peake	5	0	5	0	0	0
	DF	(Scotland) SCO	Bob Pursell	34	0	26	0	8	0
	GK	(Ireland) EIR	Elisha Scott	4	0	4	0	0	0
	MF	(England) ENG	Jackie Sheldon	30	6	22	5	8	1
	DF	(England) ENG	Sam Speakman	15	0	14	0	1	0
	MF	(England) ENG	Fred Staniforth	3	0	3	0	0	0
	MF	(Scotland) SCO	Jimmy Stewart	3	0	3	0	0	0

== Table ==
Pos	Team	Pld	W	D	L	GF	GA	GAv	Pts
14	Manchester United	38	15	6	17	52	62	0.839	36
15	Everton	38	12	11	15	46	55	0.836	35
16	Liverpool	38	14	7	17	46	62	0.742	35
17	Tottenham Hotspur	38	12	10	16	50	62	0.806	34
18	The Wednesday	38	13	8	17	53	70	0.757	34

Source: World Football
Rules for classification: 1) Points; 2) Goal average; 3) Goals scored
