= 1914–15 Liverpool F.C. season =

English football club season

Liverpool F.C
1914–15 season
- Manager: Tom Watson
- Stadium: Anfield
- Football League: 13th
- FA Cup: Second round
- Top goalscorer: League: Fred Pagnam (24); All: Fred Pagnam (26)

The 1914–15 Liverpool F.C. season was the 23rd season in existence for Liverpool.

== Squad statistics ==
=== Appearances and goals ===
No.	Pos	Nat	Player	Total		Division 1		F.A. Cup	
No.	Pos	Nat	Player	Apps	Goals	Apps	Goals	Apps	Goals
	FW	(England) ENG	Billy Banks	17	2	17	2	0	0
	FW	(England) ENG	Wilf Bartrop	3	0	3	0	0	0
	DF	(England) ENG	Phil Bratley	13	0	13	0	0	0
	GK	(Scotland) SCO	Kenny Campbell	15	0	15	0	0	0
	DF	(Scotland) SCO	Bob Crawford	6	0	6	0	0	0
	MF	(Scotland) SCO	Tom Fairfoul	25	0	24	0	1	0
	MF	(Scotland) SCO	Bob Ferguson	18	0	18	0	0	0
	FW	(England) ENG	Charlie Hafekost	1	0	1	0	0	0
	MF	(Ireland) EIR	Billy Lacey	33	2	32	2	1	0
	DF	(England) ENG	Ephraim Longworth	37	0	35	0	2	0
	MF	(England) ENG	Harry Lowe	28	0	26	0	2	0
	FW	(Scotland) SCO	Bob McDougall	1	0	1	0	0	0
	DF	(Scotland) SCO	Donald McKinlay	22	1	20	1	2	0
	FW	(England) ENG	Arthur Metcalf	16	7	14	6	2	1
	FW	(Scotland) SCO	Tom Miller	35	11	33	11	2	0
	FW	(Scotland) SCO	Jimmy Nicholl	40	9	38	9	2	0
	FW	(England) ENG	Fred Pagnam	31	26	29	24	2	2
	DF	(Scotland) SCO	Bob Pursell	29	0	27	0	2	0
	GK	(Ireland) EIR	Elisha Scott	25	0	23	0	2	0
	MF	(England) ENG	Jackie Sheldon	37	10	35	10	2	0
	DF	(England) ENG	Sam Speakman	7	0	7	0	0	0
	DF	(England) ENG	Walter Wadsworth	1	0	1	0	0	0

== Table ==
Pos	Team	Pld	W	D	L	GF	GA	GAv	Pts
11	Bradford City	38	13	14	11	55	49	1.122	40
12	Middlesbrough	38	13	12	13	62	74	0.838	38
13	Liverpool	38	14	9	15	65	75	0.867	37
14	Aston Villa	38	13	11	14	62	72	0.861	37
15	Newcastle United	38	11	10	17	46	48	0.958	32

Source: World Football
Rules for classification: 1) Points; 2) Goal average; 3) Goals scored
