= History of Liverpool F.C. (1892–1959) =

History of an English football club

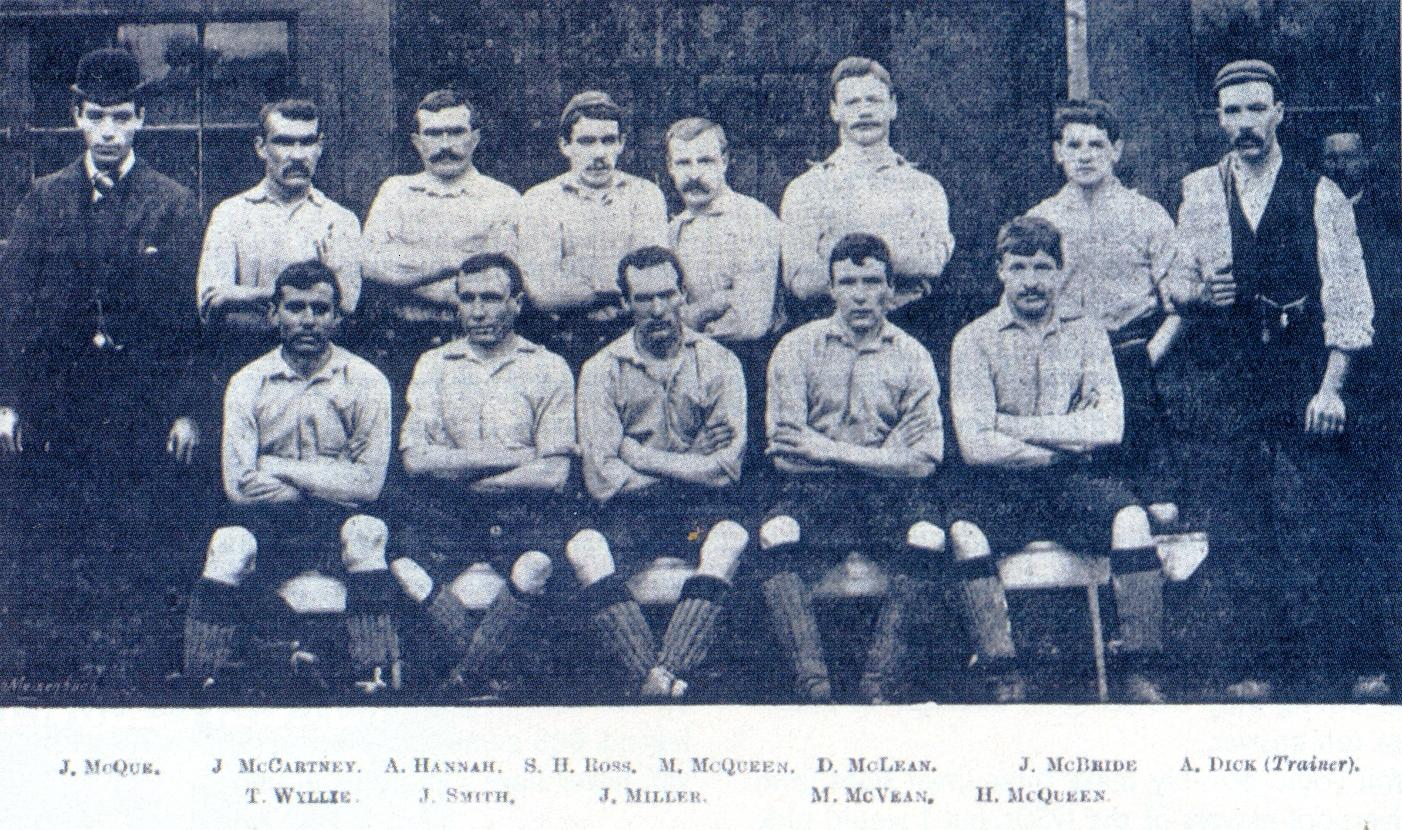
Liverpool's team during their first season, 1892–93

The history of Liverpool Football Club from 1892 to 1959 covers the period from the club's foundation, through their first period of success from 1900 to the 1920s, to the appointment of Bill Shankly as manager.

Liverpool Football Club was formed on 15 March 1892 following a disagreement between the directors of Everton Football Club and its president, John Houlding, who owned the club's ground, Anfield. A dispute over rent resulted in Everton moving to Goodison Park, which left Houlding with an empty stadium. Thus, he founded Liverpool F.C., and they joined the Lancashire League. After winning the league title in their first season, Liverpool were accepted into the Football League for the 1893–94 season, following the resignations of Accrington and Bootle.

The appointment of Tom Watson as the club's manager in 1896 led to the club's first period of sustained success. Liverpool consolidated their position in the Football League following promotion to the First Division, and won their first League championship in 1901. A further championship followed in 1906, and in 1914 the club reached their first FA Cup final, losing to Burnley. Watson died suddenly in 1915 of pneumonia after the outbreak of the First World War. The club won two further championships in 1922 and 1923 when football resumed after the war.

An expansion to the Spion Kop terracing in the 1920s increased Anfield's capacity. Liverpool's fortunes declined during the inter-war years, when the club often finished in midtable. Liverpool became League champions again in 1947, in the first season after the Second World War, but following a slow downturn in performance the club was relegated to the Second Division in 1954. By the time of Shankly's appointment in 1959, Liverpool had been in the Second Division for five seasons.

== Formation ==
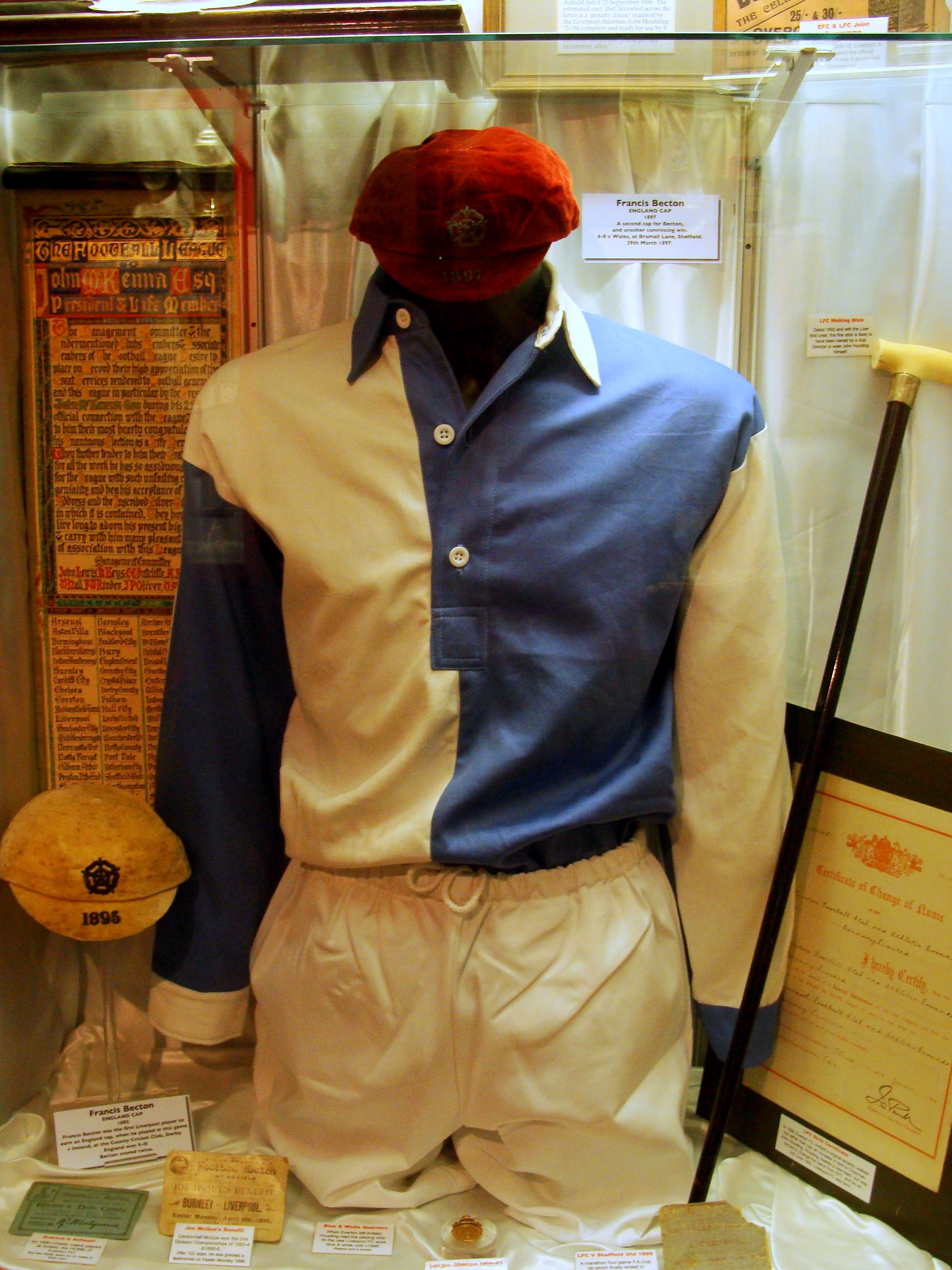
The original kit that Liverpool wore upon their foundation until 1894

Founded in 1878, Everton moved to Anfield in 1884, a facility owned by the club's president, John Houlding, a former Lord Mayor of Liverpool. In 1892 a dispute arose between Houlding and the Everton board of directors, over the club's tenancy of the ground. The annual rent had risen from £100 in 1884 to £250 in 1892; Houlding wanted to sell the ground to the club, which in turn wished to agree a long-term rental. Houlding would only agree to this on the basis of a rent at a level unacceptable to the club. Negotiations having failed, the directors decided to leave Anfield and find another ground, leaving Houlding with an empty stadium. His response was to form a new football club to occupy the stadium. He attempted to retain the team name "Everton" by registering the name "Everton Football Club and Athletic Grounds Company, Limited" with Companies House, but the Football League decided that the name belonged to the departed Everton club, which acquired new premises at Goodison Park. Houlding therefore adopted the name "Liverpool Football Club" for his new venture.

Having established his new club, Houlding applied for membership of the First Division of the Football League, rather than the newly formed Second Division. The League, unimpressed with this premature application, refused to admit the club, which instead joined the Lancashire League. Liverpool played their first match on 1 September 1892, a pre-season friendly match against Rotherham Town, which they won 7–1. The team Liverpool fielded against Rotherham was composed entirely of Scottish players – the players who came from Scotland to play in England in those days were known as the Scotch Professors. Manager John McKenna had recruited the players after a scouting trip to Scotland – so they became known as the "team of Macs". Liverpool's first match in the Lancashire League, which they won 8–0, was against Higher Walton. 200 spectators attended the match, but as the twenty-two match season proceeded, and Liverpool continued to win, attendances increased. Approximately 2,000 people watched Liverpool defeat South Shore in the penultimate match of the season at Anfield.

Liverpool's first season was successful, as the club narrowly won the Lancashire League title on goal average, over Blackpool. They also won the Liverpool District Cup by defeating Everton. The subsequent theft of the league and cup trophies cost the club £130 to replace them. Following their success, Liverpool reapplied to the Football League. This application was successful, mainly because of the resignations of Accrington and Bootle from the Second Division. Liverpool's original strip had been blue and white chequered shirts and white shorts, similar to those of their neighbours Everton. From 1894 they changed to red shirts and white shorts.

The club's first match in the Football League was against Middlesbrough Ironopolis on 2 September 1893, which they won 2–0, with Malcolm McVean scoring Liverpool's first goal in League football. Liverpool's first season in the Football League saw them unbeaten in 28 matches, 22 of which they won. They finished at the top of the Second Division, but as at that time there was no automatic promotion to the First Division, they were entered into the test match system. This involved a knockout match with the bottom team in the First Division, Newton Heath (later renamed Manchester United). Liverpool won, and took their place in the First Division. Their stay in the division lasted only a season, as they finished in bottom position, with seven wins from thirty matches. They were relegated to the Second Division, after facing Bury in the test match and losing 1–0, despite Bury playing most of the match with ten men after their goalkeeper was sent off.

== Consolidation ==
As more people began to watch Liverpool, the ground capacity was expanded. The Main Stand was built, which helped to bring regular attendances of around 20,000. Liverpool's stay in the Second Division was brief, as they secured promotion to the First Division during the 1895–96 season – twelve wins in their final fourteen matches gave them a first-place finish, followed by success in the test matches over Small Heath (later renamed Birmingham City) and West Bromwich Albion. The club reached the semi-final of the FA Cup for the first time in the 1896–97 season; they were drawn against Aston Villa, and with Everton in the other semi-final, there was the prospect of a first all-Merseyside cup final. However, while Everton won their tie, Liverpool were defeated 3–0. After winning promotion, the club appointed Tom Watson, who was managing Sunderland, as their new manager. Watson's record of three League championships in four seasons with Sunderland convinced Houlding to make Watson the highest-paid manager in England, with a yearly salary of £300.

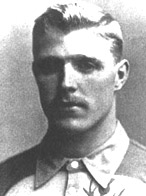
Alex Raisbeck, who captained Liverpool to their first League championship

During the next two seasons Liverpool consolidated their place in the First Division, with fifth and ninth-place finishes. Performances improved in the 1898–99 season, when the club went into their final game with a chance of winning their first League championship. They faced Aston Villa, with whom they were level on points, although Villa's goal average advantage of 0.02 meant that they only needed to draw the match to win the League title. In the event, Villa won 5–0, to leave Liverpool as the runners-up. Liverpool also reached the FA Cup semi-final, where they faced Sheffield United. The match finished in a 2–2 draw; the first replay at Burnden Park also finished with the sides equal at 4–4, and a second replay at the small Fallowfield Stadium was abandoned when overcrowding caused fans to spill onto the pitch. The tie was finally decided at the Baseball Ground, which Sheffield United won 1–0.

Liverpool won their first League championship in 1901. Integral to their success were their captain Alex Raisbeck, and striker Sam Raybould. Raisbeck, a centre-half, had been signed from Hibernian in 1898. He became club captain a year later, and was often the focal point of the team, as an important defensive player and the instigator of many of Liverpool's attacks. Raybould was signed from local club New Brighton Tower, and in the 1899–1900 season scored seven times as the club won nine of their last eleven matches, to finish in tenth place. He would go on to score 128 goals in 226 matches for Liverpool. Success in the 1900–01 season looked unlikely in February, at which point Liverpool had lost eight games and conceded 31 goals. However, they won nine and drew three of their next twelve matches, while only conceding four goals, to achieve their first League title. They were less successful in the following two seasons, finishing in eleventh and fifth places respectively. The 1903–04 season saw the club relegated to the Second Division; like the previous relegation it was only for one year as they won the division the following season. On their return in the 1905–06 season they became the first team to win the Second and First Division in successive seasons. They also reached the semi-final of the FA Cup, where they faced Everton and lost 2–0.

Houlding died in 1902, and in 1905 the ownership of the club was restructured. Of the existing 3,000 shares, 2,000 were held by the Houlding family. The club owed a debt of £10,000 to Houlding, and a further £5,000 bank overdraft was guaranteed by his family. The family offered to give up the 2,000 shares and wipe out the debt, if the club relieved them of the bank loan guarantee. The board agreed, and a new share issue was released in 1906 with 15,000 shares available for £1 each. Following the share issue, McKenna became chairman of the club.

Following the club's successes, a new stand was erected along the Walton Breck Road end of the ground. The stand became known as the Spion Kop – it was originally given this name by local journalist Ernest Edwards, the sports editor of the Liverpool Daily Post and the Echo, after a famous hill in South Africa, where a local regiment had suffered heavy losses during the Boer War. More than 300 men had died, many of them from Liverpool, as the British army attempted to capture the strategic hilltop.

In the seasons following their second league title, Liverpool enjoyed limited success, generally finishing in midtable. They finished in second place behind Aston Villa in the 1909–10 season, the last for their captain, Raisbeck, who returned to his native Scotland to play for Partick Thistle. Liverpool's form declined after his departure, with their best performance in the League a 12th-place finish in the 1912–13 season. There was improvement in 1914 when the club reached their first FA Cup final, which they lost 1–0 to Burnley at Crystal Palace. The following season four Liverpool players were implicated in the 1915 British football betting scandal, which involved a match with Manchester United. A 2–0 victory for United was required to win the bet, in which players from both sides were involved. With the score at 2–0, Liverpool's Fred Pagnam hit the crossbar with a shot, at which several of his teammates gestured angrily towards him. Subsequently, Tom Fairfoul, Tom Miller, Bob Pursell and Jackie Sheldon were found guilty by a Football Association (FA) enquiry of conspiring with three Manchester United players (Sandy Turnbull, Arthur Whalley and Enoch West) to fix a United win. All the players involved were banned for life. Following the end of the First World War, in which Turnbull was killed at the Battle of Arras in 1917, the FA lifted the surviving players' bans in recognition of their service in the conflict.

== Inter-war years ==
Three weeks after visiting his hometown of Newcastle to celebrate his 56th birthday, Liverpool's manager Tom Watson developed a severe chill, which developed into pneumonia. He died on 6 May 1915; Raisbeck and two other former Liverpool stars, Ned Doig and Arthur Goddard, were pallbearers at the funeral.

During the First World War, with normal Football League activity suspended, Liverpool competed in a regional league, the Lancashire Section. The competition was split into two parts: "Principal Tournament" and the "Supplementary Competition". Liverpool won the former in the 1916–17 season, and the latter in the 1917–18 and 1918–19 seasons. A number of Liverpool players fought in the war, including Philip Bratley, Robert Crawford and Wilfred Bartrop. Bartrop was the only one to be killed, dying on 7 November 1918 while fighting in Belgium.

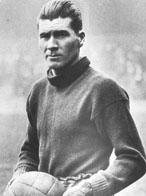
Elisha Scott, Liverpool's goalkeeper from 1912 to 1934

When football resumed after the war for the 1919–20 season, Watson's post as manager was taken by David Ashworth. Liverpool finished in fourth place. During the season George V became the first reigning monarch to watch a League match, when Liverpool played Manchester City. Liverpool repeated their fourth-place finish in 1920–21. Another Scottish defender, Donald McKinlay, was given the captaincy from January 1922 to 1928. Liverpool regained the League championship in the 1921–22 season. Liverpool had looked certain title winners, before the loss of three of their last six games put their chances in doubt. A 4–1 victory over West Bromwich Albion in the last match of the season was enough to secure Liverpool's third League championship.

Ashworth left Liverpool midway through the following season, to manage Oldham Athletic – he wished to be closer to his wife and daughter, who lived in nearby Stockport. His replacement was the former Liverpool player Matt McQueen, a club director. McQueen was intended as a temporary appointment, but he kept the job as Liverpool retained the League championship. This success owed much to the form of their goalkeeper Elisha Scott, who conceded only 31 goals during the season, a league record at the time. Liverpool's total of 60 points in the season equalled the record set by West Bromwich Albion three seasons earlier. Harry Chambers top scored in the first four post World War 1 seasons including the two title wins.

Following their successive championships, Liverpool's fortunes declined as their side aged. Some of the players had begun their careers before the war; goalkeeper Scott had been in the side since 1912. The club began the 1923–24 season aiming to win three league titles in a row, but finished in twelfth place. They achieved fourth place the following season, which was to be their best finish until after the Second World War. Changes to the offside rule in the 1925–26 season resulted in an increase in the number of goals scored during matches. Liverpool contributed to this, with big victories over Manchester United and Newcastle United, but could only manage a seventh-place finish.

In 1920, the Kop had been redesigned and extended to hold 30,000 spectators, all standing. At the time, the Kop was the biggest football stand in the country, able to hold more spectators than the entire capacity of some grounds. The increase in spectators did not fully restore Liverpool's fortunes; they scored 90 goals during the 1928–29 season, striker Gordon Hodgson scoring thirty of them, yet finished in fifth place. McQueen was unable to replicate his early triumphs with the club, and retired in 1928 after his leg was amputated following a road accident. He was replaced as manager by club secretary George Patterson. The club's fortunes did not improve under Patterson's leadership; they generally finished midtable. Their results were inconsistent; in September 1930, they lost 7–0 at West Ham United, yet nine days later they beat Bolton Wanderers 7–2 at Anfield.

During the 1930s Liverpool's form continued to deteriorate, and they avoided relegation in the 1933–34 season by only four points. Scott left the club at the end of what had been a poor season for the veteran goalkeeper. In ten matches from the start of 1934, Liverpool won only once with Scott in goal, and after a 9–2 defeat against Newcastle United, he was replaced by Arthur Riley. The change of goalkeepers brought an upturn in form, with a 6–2 victory over Birmingham City and a 4–1 win against Middlesbrough. Scott, who joined Belfast Celtic after 24 years at Liverpool, remains the club's longest-serving player. As they became used to finishing in the lower part of the league table, Liverpool began to lose their best players. Hodgson, who had scored 233 goals in 358 league games, was sold to Aston Villa in 1936 and the club struggled to replace him. They finished 19th in the season following his departure. Also in 1936, Patterson resigned as manager for health reasons, and resumed his role as the club's secretary. His replacement, Southampton manager George Kay, did not initially fare much better; Liverpool narrowly avoided relegation in the 1936–37 season, and finished in 11th place in each of the following two seasons. By the outbreak of the Second World War, Liverpool had become accustomed to finishing midtable.

Soon after the outbreak of war in 1939, the 1939–40 season was cancelled and all first-class football in Britain temporarily suspended. When matches resumed, competitions were played on a regional basis as in the previous war, and teams often did not complete a full season. Liverpool participated in the Football League North, which they won in the 1942–43 season. Many footballers served in the armed forces, away from their clubs for long periods, and would often appear as "guests" for other clubs. Two Liverpool players were decorated for their wartime service; Berry Nieuwenhuys received the Czech Medal of Merit, and Bill Jones was awarded the Military Medal after rescuing wounded comrades under fire.

== Post-war champions then decline ==
League football in England resumed in the 1946–47 season, after seven seasons' suspension due to the war. Before the resumption, Liverpool embarked on an eight-week tour of the United States and Canada, scoring 70 goals in the ten matches played. In escaping from post-war food rationing while on tour, the Liverpool players were able to eat more, and by the end of the trip had gained in weight an average of 7 pounds (3.2 kg) per man. The New York Times reporter who followed the team on the tour noted the "perceptible gain in strength on the playing field."

The first game played at Anfield after the war was against Middlesbrough, on 4 September 1946, which Liverpool lost 1–0 before a crowd of 34,140. Despite this defeat, Liverpool finished the 1946–47 season as League champions captained again by a Scot, Willie Fagan. Vital to this success were their attacking players; after a 5–0 defeat to Manchester United the club bought Albert Stubbins from Newcastle United, to augment the attack alongside Jack Balmer and Billy Liddell. Stubbins and Balmer were joint top scorers with 24 league goals, and Balmer scored hat-tricks in three successive matches. It was a goal by Stubbins in the last match against Wolverhampton Wanderers that secured the title for Liverpool in a 2-1 win over their title rivals.

The club were unable to match this success in the two seasons that followed, and finished in 11th and 12th places respectively. The 1949–50 season brought another disappointing league campaign. The season started well, as the club was unbeaten in their first 19 matches and was top of the league at the turn of the year. Their form declined thereafter, and they finished eighth. This did not hinder their progress in the FA Cup, as they reached their second final (their first at Wembley), against Arsenal. They were unable to win their first FA Cup; two goals from Arsenal striker Reg Lewis meant Liverpool lost 2–0.

After their FA Cup final appearance, Liverpool's fortunes declined steadily. Kay resigned through ill health and was replaced by Don Welsh. Welsh's first season did not go smoothly, as Liverpool were knocked out of the FA Cup in the third round by Norwich City of the Third Division South. The following year, 61,905 spectators watched Liverpool beat Wolverhampton Wanderers 2–1 in the fourth round of the FA Cup, the biggest attendance ever recorded at Anfield. Under Welsh's stewardship the club gradually slipped further down the table, and were relegated to the Second Division in the 1953–54 season, after finishing in bottom place. Their relegation came after 49 uninterrupted years in the top division of English football.

Liverpool's first season in the Second Division in 1954–55 brought them an 11th-place finish. During this season, the club suffered the biggest defeat in its history, a 9–1 loss to Birmingham City. Although in the following season they improved to third place, it was not enough for Welsh to keep his job and he was sacked at the end of the season. His replacement was Phil Taylor, a former captain of the club and a member of the coaching staff. Taylor signed players such as Ronnie Moran, Alan A'Court and Jimmy Melia, who would become mainstays of the club for seasons to come, but was unable to guide Liverpool back to the First Division. The Liverpool board persisted with him, despite the club's loss to non-League side Worcester City in the third round of the FA Cup in January 1959. His tenure ended during the 1959–60 season; after a good start, their form began to tail off mid-season, and after a defeat to Huddersfield Town, Taylor resigned. The man who replaced him was Huddersfield's manager, Bill Shankly.

== Bibliography ==
- Butler, Bryon (1988). The Football League: The First 100 Years. Guildford: Colour Library Books. ISBN 0-86283-583-6.
- Kelly, Stephen F. (1988). The Official Illustrated History of Liverpool FC: You'll Never Walk Alone. London: Queen Anne Press. ISBN 0-356-19594-5.
- Kynaston, David (2007). Austerity Britain 1945–51. London: Bloomsbury. ISBN 978-0-7475-9923-4.
- Liversedge, Stan (1991). Liverpool: The Official Centenary History, 1892–1992. London: Hamlyn Publishing Group. ISBN 0-600-57308-7.
- Pead, Brian (1986). Liverpool: A Complete Record 1892–1986. Derby: Breedon Books. ISBN 0-907969-15-1.
- Williams, John (2010). Reds: Liverpool Football Club – The Biography. Edinburgh: Mainstream Publishing. ISBN 978-1-84596-682-9.
- Wilson, Jonathan; Murray, Scott (2013). The Anatomy of Liverpool: A History in Ten Matches. London: Orion. ISBN 978-1-4091-2692-8.
