= 1912–13 Liverpool F.C. season =

English football club season

Liverpool F.C
1912–13 season
- Manager: Tom Watson
- Stadium: Anfield
- Football League: 12th
- FA Cup: Third round
- Top goalscorer: League: Arthur Metcalf (15); All: Arthur Metcalf (18)

The 1912–13 Liverpool F.C. season was the 21st season in existence for Liverpool.

== Squad statistics ==
=== Appearances and goals ===
No.	Pos	Nat	Player	Total		Division 1		F.A. Cup	
No.	Pos	Nat	Player	Apps	Goals	Apps	Goals	Apps	Goals
	FW	(England) ENG	Arthur Berry	1	0	1	0	0	0
	FW	(Scotland) SCO	John Bovill	1	0	1	0	0	0
	GK	(Scotland) SCO	Kenny Campbell	41	0	37	0	4	0
	DF	(Scotland) SCO	Bob Crawford	26	0	22	0	4	0
	MF	(England) ENG	Joe Dines	1	0	1	0	0	0
	MF	(Scotland) SCO	Bob Ferguson	42	2	38	2	4	0
	FW	(Scotland) SCO	Sammy Gilligan	2	0	2	0	0	0
	MF	(England) ENG	Arthur Goddard	37	8	33	7	4	1
	FW	(Scotland) SCO	Tommy Gracie	14	1	13	1	1	0
	MF	(England) ENG	Ralph Holden	1	0	1	0	0	0
	MF	(Ireland) EIR	Billy Lacey	24	6	20	3	4	3
	DF	(United States) USA	Hugh Lester	1	0	1	0	0	0
	DF	(England) ENG	Ephraim Longworth	39	0	36	0	3	0
	MF	(England) ENG	Harry Lowe	38	1	34	1	4	0
	DF	(Scotland) SCO	Donald McKinlay	23	6	22	6	1	0
	FW	(England) ENG	Arthur Metcalf	32	18	28	15	4	3
	FW	(Scotland) SCO	Tom Miller	34	9	30	9	4	0
	FW	(England) ENG	Jack Parkinson	27	12	25	12	2	0
	DF	(Wales) WAL	Ernie Peake	30	3	26	2	4	1
	DF	(Scotland) SCO	Bob Pursell	21	0	20	0	1	0
	GK	(Ireland) EIR	Elisha Scott	1	0	1	0	0	0
	MF	(Scotland) SCO	James Scott	6	0	6	0	0	0
	DF	(England) ENG	James Speakman	1	0	1	0	0	0
	MF	(Scotland) SCO	Jimmy Stewart	4	1	4	1	0	0
	MF	(England) ENG	John Tosswill	11	1	11	1	0	0
	FW	(England) ENG	Harry Welfare	4	1	4	1	0	0

== Table ==
Pos	Team	Pld	W	D	L	GF	GA	GAv	Pts
10	West Bromwich Albion	38	13	12	13	57	50	1.140	38
11	Everton	38	15	7	16	48	54	0.889	37
12	Liverpool	38	16	5	17	61	71	0.859	37
13	Bradford City	38	12	11	15	50	60	0.833	35
14	Newcastle United	38	13	8	17	47	47	1.000	34

Source: World Football
Rules for classification: 1) Points; 2) Goal average; 3) Goals scored
