= 1915–16 Liverpool F.C. season =

English football club season

Liverpool F.C
1915–16 season
- Manager: Committee
- Stadium: Anfield
- Top goalscorer: Fred Pagnam (34)

The 1915–16 Liverpool F.C. season saw Liverpool compete in the wartime football league, which was set up following the outbreak of World War I. They competed in the Lancashire Section Principle Tournament and the Lancashire Section Supplementary Competition.

== Squad statistics ==
=== Appearances and goals ===
No.	Pos	Nat	Player	Total		Principle		Supplementary	
No.	Pos	Nat	Player	Apps	Goals	Apps	Goals	Apps	Goals
	DF	(England) ENG	Jack Bamber	14	0	4	0	10	0
	FW	(England) ENG	Billy Banks	21	4	16	3	5	1
	DF	(England) ENG	Norman Bradley	13	0	13	0	0	0
	GK	(Scotland) SCO	Kenny Campbell	11	0	10	0	1	0
	MF	(England) ENG	Tommy Cunliffe	14	0	4	0	10	0
	FW	(Scotland) SCO	Jimmy Dawson	11	2	11	2	0	0
	MF	(Scotland) SCO	Tom Fairfoul	5	0	5	0	0	0
	MF	(England) ENG	Arthur Goddard	26	3	20	3	6	0
	(unknown)	(England) ENG	James Henderson	9	1	9	1	0	0
	(unknown)		James Kennedy	1	0	0	0	1	0
	MF	(Ireland) EIR	Billy Lacey	1	0	1	0	0	0
	DF	(England) ENG	Ephraim Longworth	32	1	22	1	10	0
	MF	(England) ENG	Alex McGhie	4	0	4	0	0	0
	DF	(Scotland) SCO	Donald McKinlay	29	4	23	4	6	0
	FW	(England) ENG	Arthur Metcalf	15	5	9	3	6	2
	DF	(England) ENG	James Middlehurst	27	0	19	0	8	0
	MF	(England) ENG	William Molyneux	7	0	7	0	0	0
	FW	(England) ENG	Fred Pagnam	34	30	26	21	8	9
	FW	(England) ENG	Ernie Pinkney	24	3	17	2	7	1
	FW	(England) ENG	George Ritchie	1	0	1	0	0	0
	GK	(Ireland) EIR	Elisha Scott	15	0	15	0	0	0
	MF	(Scotland) SCO	James Scott	2	0	2	0	0	0
	DF	(England) ENG	Sam Speakman	11	0	9	0	2	0
	GK	(England) ENG	Ted Taylor	10	0	1	0	9	0
	DF	(England) ENG	Walter Wadsworth	20	2	12	1	8	1
	(unknown)		Robert Waine	5	1	2	0	3	1
	FW		Wilfred Watson	28	13	18	7	10	6
	FW	(England) ENG	Dai Williams	2	0	2	0	0	0
	DF	(England) ENG	Ted Winn	4	0	4	0	0	0
