= Match fixing in English football =

Over the course of the game's history, several incidents relating to match-fixing in English football have taken place.

== 19th Century Test match collusion ==
From 1893–1898, a form of play-offs known as test matches were used to decide promotion and relegation between the two divisions of the Football League. Initially they were direct ties between two teams, but from 1896 a round-robin format was used. In the 1898 test matches, earlier results meant Stoke and Burnley went into the final test match knowing a draw would result in promotion for both teams. In their 0–0 draw, the pair made little attempt to hide their collusion. The Athletic News reported that "the teams could have done without goalkeepers, so anxious were the forwards not to score". The Football League resolved the ensuing scandal by expanding the First Division from 16 to 18 clubs, allowing promotion for all four of the clubs who participated in the test matches. The test match system was then abandoned.

The following season, Burnley's Jack Hillman offered Nottingham Forest players £2 each to "take it easy" in a match between the teams. Hillman was suspended for a year for his actions.

== Billy Meredith bribery suspension ==
On the final day of the 1904–05 season, Aston Villa and Manchester City played a particularly bad-tempered game, in which a number of fights broke out. Four months later, it emerged that Villa captain Alec Leake had come forward with an accusation: that City's Billy Meredith had offered him £10 to allow City to win. The Football Association suspended Meredith until April 1906. Meredith, who had not been permitted to give evidence at the hearing, protested his innocence. Later, however, while engaged in a dispute with Manchester City over whether he should be paid during his suspension, he spoke out on the matter. He admitted the bribery attempt, but intimated that others were involved, saying "I was only the spokesman of others equally guilty".

== 1915 betting scandal ==
A 1915 match between Liverpool and Manchester United aroused suspicions owing to the apparent lack of effort on the part of the Liverpool players. The match finished 2–0 to a relegation-threatened Manchester United.

After the match, handbills started to appear, alleging that a large amount of money had been bet at odds of 7/1 on a 2–0 win to United. An investigation by the Football Association was launched and found that players from both sides had been involved in rigging the match: Sandy Turnbull, Arthur Whalley and Enoch West of United, and Jackie Sheldon, Tom Miller, Bob Pursell and Thomas Fairfoul of Liverpool; Sheldon was a former United player himself and was found to be the plot's ringleader. Some players, such as Liverpool's Fred Pagnam and United's George Anderson refused to take part. Pagnam had threatened to score a goal to ruin the result, and indeed late in the match hit the crossbar, causing his teammates to publicly remonstrate with him. He later testified against his team-mates at the FA hearing. At the same hearing, United player Billy Meredith denied any knowledge of the match-fixing, but stated that he became suspicious when none of his teammates would pass the ball to him.

All seven players were banned from playing for life in a decision handed down on 27 December 1915. The FA concluded that it had been a conspiracy by the players alone – no official from either club was found guilty of wrongdoing, and neither club was fined or had points deducted.

== Accrington Stanley–Bury, 2008 ==
Unusual betting patterns were reported for a match between Accrington Stanley and Bury on the final day of the 2007–08 season. A Football Association investigation resulted in five players, four of whom played for Accrington Stanley and the other for Bury, being charged with betting on a Bury win. Jay Harris was banned from playing for a year, David Mannix for ten months, Robert Williams and Peter Cavanagh for eight months, and Andy Mangan for five months. Each player was also fined between £2,000–5,000.

== Europol investigation ==
A Europol investigation into match-fixing by criminal syndicates published its initial findings in February 2013. Of 380 matches in Europe alleged to be fixed, one took place in England. The match, a UEFA Champions League tie from the "last three or four years", was not named due to "ongoing judicial proceedings".

== 2013 match fixing scandal ==
Six people were arrested by the National Crime Agency in the wake of an investigation by the Daily Telegraph newspaper in November 2013.

== Bibliography ==
- Simon Inglis, Soccer in the Dock (Collins, 1985) ISBN 0-00-218162-2 ISBN 978-0-00-218162-4
