= 1914 FA Cup final =

Football match between Burnley and Liverpool

1914 FA Cup Final
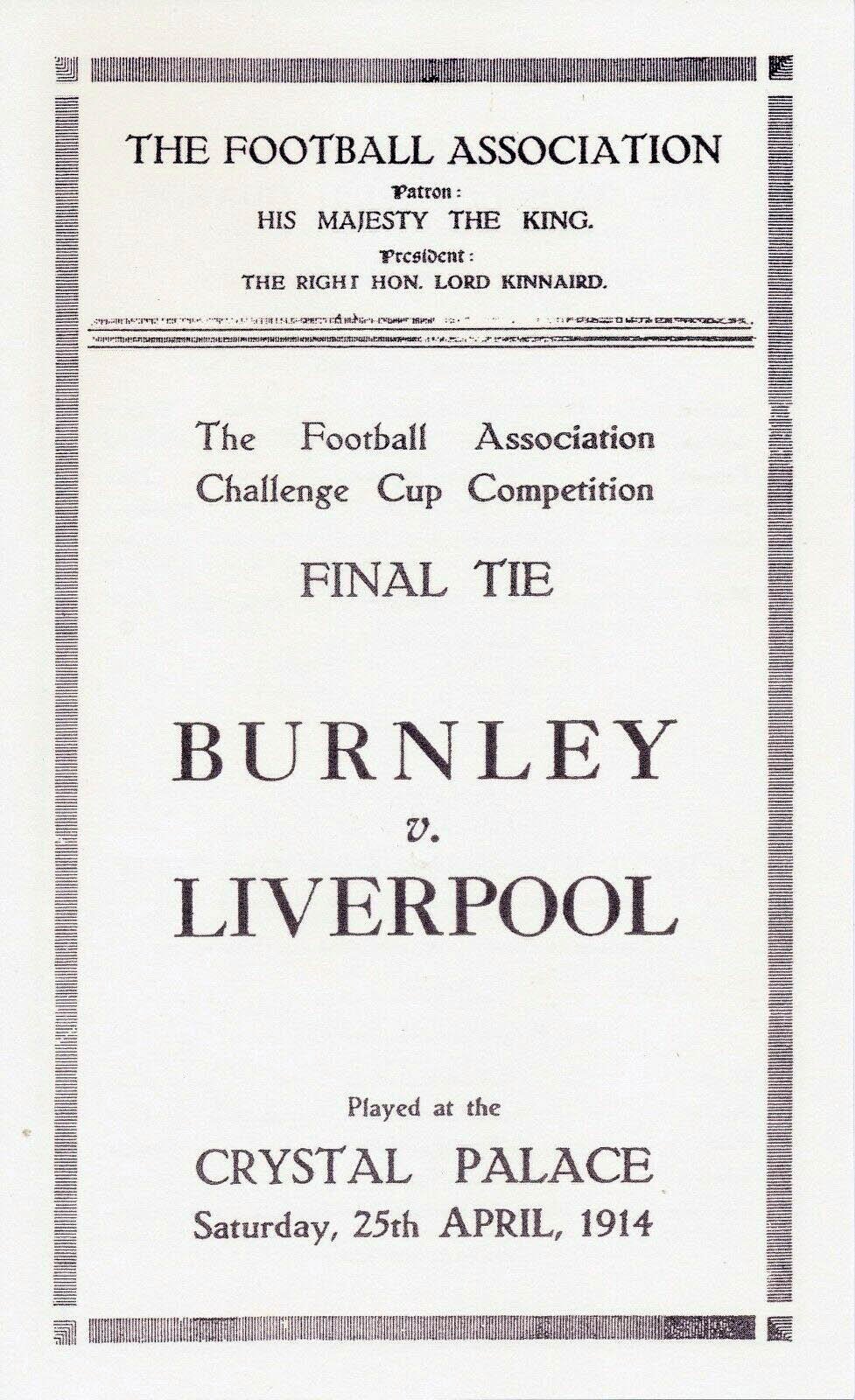
- Official programme
- Event: 1913–14 FA Cup
Burnley	Liverpool
1	0
- Date: 25 April 1914
- Venue: Crystal Palace, London
- Referee: Herbert Bamlett (Gateshead)
- Attendance: 72,778

The 1914 FA Cup final was an association football match between Burnley and Liverpool on 25 April 1914 at Crystal Palace, London. It was the final match of the 1913–14 FA Cup, the 43rd season of the country's primary cup competition, the FA Cup. Both teams were appearing in their first FA Cup final. Burnley and Liverpool, as members of the Football League First Division, entered the competition in the first round and progressed through five rounds to reach the final, both playing seven matches including two replays. Burnley had eliminated four clubs from the First Division en route to the final.

Harry Lowe, Liverpool's captain, was ruled out for the final, while Burnley goalkeeper Jerry Dawson decided not to play due to injury. Burnley's line-up contained nine Englishmen, of whom six were Lancastrians; seven of Liverpool's starting eleven were Scottish. King George V was in attendance for the match, which marked the first time a reigning monarch attended an FA Cup final. Liverpool were the bookies' favourites. The Birmingham Daily Post stated that the majority expected Burnley to win, however, while The Standard suggested Burnley were a "cleverer team" and had a better half-back line than Liverpool.

Watched by a crowd of 72,778, the first half was goalless as both sides struggled to create goalscoring chances. In the 58th minute, Bert Freeman put Burnley 1–0 in front with a powerful half-volley. Liverpool could not find an equaliser before the match ended. It was Burnley's first, and as of 2025, only FA Cup triumph. Burnley captain Tommy Boyle, praised by the Manchester Courier for his leadership throughout the match, received the trophy from King George V.

By defeating Liverpool, Burnley became the first side to beat five clubs from the first tier in one FA Cup season. Labelled the "Royal Cup Final" by various newspapers, the game was regarded as clean but lacking in quality. It was noted by several newspapers that the players struggled with the heat and a dry and hard pitch. It was the last FA Cup final at Crystal Palace; the 1915 FA Cup final between Sheffield United and Chelsea was held at Old Trafford, Manchester, as Crystal Palace was used as a war depot during the First World War.

== Route to the final ==
=== Burnley ===
Round	Opposition	Score
1st	South Shields (h)	3–1
2nd	Derby County (h)	3–2
3rd	Bolton Wanderers (h)	3–0
4th	Sunderland (a)	0–0
4th	Sunderland (h)	2–1
Semi-final	Sheffield United (n)	0–0
Semi-final	Sheffield United (n)	1–0
Key: (h) = Home venue; (a) = Away venue; (n) = Neutral venue

Burnley began their campaign for the 1913–14 FA Cup in January 1914 in the first round with a home game at Turf Moor against South Shields, leaders of the North Eastern League. Tommy Boyle missed a penalty kick for Burnley, after which Dick Lindley scored twice to put Burnley 2–0 up in the first half. Bert Freeman added a third goal in the second half before South Shields found the back of the Burnley net, with the match ending in a 3–1 victory for the home side. Burnley were drawn against a Football League First Division—the first tier of English football—opponent in the second round, meeting Derby County at Turf Moor. In very windy conditions, Teddy Hodgson put Burnley in front after 14 minutes with a flying header. Halfway through the second half, Derby equalised. Nearing the end of the game, three goals came in the space of three minutes: Hodgson put Burnley back in front, Derby levelled a minute later, after which Hodgson immediately netted again to complete his hat-trick. During the remaining 10 minutes of the match, Burnley easily held their lead.

In the third round Burnley were again drawn at home, against fellow Lancastrian side Bolton Wanderers, who were third in the First Division table. Burnley proceeded to the fourth round with a 3–0 victory with goals from Freeman, Hodgson and George Halley. Due to Burnley's "energetic" and "intelligent" style of play, The Manchester Guardian concluded "On Saturday's form Burnley should be quite good enough to win the Cup". Burnley were paired with Sunderland in the fourth round; Sunderland were the 1912–13 First Division champions and runners-up in the previous FA Cup season. Sunderland reached that FA Cup final by defeating Burnley in the semi-final; it was the first time Burnley had reached that stage of the competition.

The fourth round game took place at Sunderland's Roker Park, ending in a goalless draw, necessitating a replay at Turf Moor four days later. In front of around 50,000 spectators, a then-record at Turf Moor, Burnley won 2–1 with goals from Hodgson and Lindley; Sunderland scored a consolation goal in the last minute of the game. As Sunderland were regarded as the favourites to progress to the semi-final, the Burnley Express wrote: "If Burnley keep playing as they have been, no team on earth can stop them". The semi-final, played at Old Trafford as a neutral venue, was against Sheffield United. The match ended in a goalless draw—although Sheffield United claimed without success that a shot had crossed the Burnley goal line—with The Manchester Guardian highlighting United's rough style of play. The two sides met again at Goodison Park in Liverpool in a replay four days later. Burnley goalkeeper Jerry Dawson picked up an injury during the match at Old Trafford and was replaced by Ronnie Sewell. In a tight game, captain Boyle scored the only goal of the game in the 75th minute to send Burnley to the final.

=== Liverpool ===
Round	Opposition	Score
1st	Barnsley (h)	1–1
1st	Barnsley (a)	1–0
2nd	Gillingham (h)	2–0
3rd	West Ham United (a)	1–1
3rd	West Ham United (h)	5–1
4th	Queens Park Rangers (h)	2–1
Semi-final	Aston Villa (n)	2–0
Key: (h) = Home venue; (a) = Away venue; (n) = Neutral venue

Liverpool entered the 1913–14 FA Cup in the first round where they faced Football League Second Division side Barnsley at home ground Anfield. Although Liverpool were the favourites to win the match, they were held to a 1–1 draw, Liverpool's scorer being Bill Lacey. The two sides met again in Barnsley in a replay five days later. Boasting a strong cup record at home and in replays, Barnsley dominated most of the game, with Liverpool goalkeeper Kenny Campbell making a string of saves. Two minutes from time, however, Lacey found the back of the Barnsley net with a "fast low shot", which proved to be the only goal of the game. Liverpool faced Gillingham of the Southern Football League at home in the second round. Nine minutes from time, Lacey put the home side 1–0 ahead—scoring for the third cup match in a row—before Robert Ferguson added a second two minutes later. In the third round, Liverpool were drawn away against West Ham United of the Southern Football League. On a heavy Upton Park pitch, the first half had a high tempo but remained goalless. Tom Miller put Liverpool ahead early in the second half before West Ham secured an equaliser to send the game to a replay at Anfield. The home side were 4–1 ahead by half-time, Lacey and Miller both scoring twice, with the former scoring his second goal from 30 yards (27 m). Although West Ham's play improved in the second half, Arthur Metcalf netted a fifth for Liverpool, the game ending in a 5–1 Liverpool victory.

Queens Park Rangers (QPR) were Liverpool's fourth round opponents. QPR, playing in the Southern Football League, would be the last non-League side reaching the last eight of the FA Cup until Lincoln City managed to do so in 2016–17. At Anfield in front of around 45,000 spectators, Liverpool were 2–0 up by half-time with goals from Jackie Sheldon and Miller, although QPR were the more dangerous side. In the 50th minute, the visitors were awarded a penalty kick but James Birch missed the target. QPR were later awarded another penalty, which was converted by Archie Mitchell. Liverpool narrowly held on for victory and progressed to the semi-final; The Leicester Daily Mercury claimed Liverpool won "luckily". The semi-final, played at Tottenham Hotspur's White Hart Lane as a neutral venue, was against Aston Villa, defending champions of the FA Cup and five-time winners of the competition. Villa had won 12 of their last 13 matches before the semi-final tie and were favourites to win the Cup. Liverpool caused an upset as James Nicholl scored a goal in each half to send the Liverpudlians to the final. Liverpool were praised by The Observer for showing a fast style of play.

== Pre-match ==
Burnley and Liverpool were both appearing in their first final. Both sides played each other twice in the First Division during the season; at Anfield, it finished in a 1–1 draw, while Burnley won 5–2 at Turf Moor. Burnley, in their first top-flight campaign in 13 years, were ensconced in lower mid-table, while Liverpool were one place above the relegation zone; the teams were separated by only two points. It was the first meeting between the clubs in the FA Cup. It was the first time in ten years—when Manchester City and Bolton Wanderers played the 1904 FA Cup final—that two teams from the county of Lancashire met in the final. Liverpool were the bookies' favourites, with odds of 4/6 to claim the cup. The Birmingham Daily Post stated that the majority expected Burnley to win, however, as they had a more difficult route to the final, having eliminated the champions of the North Eastern League (South Shields) and four First Division sides. The Standard also suggested Burnley were the slight favourites, being a "cleverer team" and having a better half-back line than Liverpool.

Burnley prepared for the final at the seaside town of Lytham, Lancashire. The players kept relaxed and fit with golf, boating and brine baths. Their training consisted of "gentle football kicking". On 23 April, two days before the final, they travelled back to Burnley, before leaving for London the following day. The Burnley team travelled to the capital by train; when they left, the train "steamed out amid rousing cheers" from Burnley fans. Liverpool were already staying in London several days before the final, in Chingford, where they had also stayed before their semi-final game against Aston Villa. On the morning of the final, around 170 special trains were put on to commute fans from Burnley and Liverpool Lime Street to London. Liverpool took at least 20,000 supporters to Crystal Palace, while Burnley were supported by around 15,000 fans.

The final was held at the Crystal Palace stadium, in Sydenham, South London. It had been the venue of the FA Cup final since 1895, although it was noted for its poor sightlines. During the previous year's cup final, between Aston Villa and Sunderland, around 20,000 spectators (of a then-record crowd of 121,919) had no view of the game. Although improvements had since been made to the ground, the Sports Argus concluded it fell "a long way short of being an ideal venue" for large crowds. As the ground was located in the Crystal Palace Park, supporters had to pay an entrance fee for the park before gaining entry to the stadium.

On the morning of the match, Liverpool captain Harry Lowe was ruled out due to an injury to his left leg. He was replaced by Donald McKinlay, with Ferguson taking over as captain. An hour before kick-off, Burnley goalkeeper Dawson decided not to play due to injury; he was replaced by Sewell. Burnley's line-up contained nine Englishmen, of whom six were Lancastrians; seven of Liverpool's starting eleven were Scottish. Only two players on the pitch had played in an FA Cup final before: Burnley's David Taylor won the 1911 FA Cup final with Bradford City, while Burnley captain Boyle lost the 1910 FA Cup final whilst at Barnsley.

Burnley arrived at Crystal Palace before the Liverpool team and picked the visitors' dressing room. Former Burnley captain Alex Leake had advised the Burnley players to do so as several previous FA Cup-winning teams had selected the away room. Liverpool played in red kits with white shorts; Burnley's shirts were claret and light blue while their shorts were white. Burnley's kits sported the royal arms crest during the final. In October 1886, Prince Albert Victor had watched Burnley play against Bolton Wanderers at Turf Moor—the first visit to a professional football ground by a member of the royal family. To commemorate the visit, Burnley received a set of kits embellished with the royal coat of arms. One of Burnley's nicknames was "Royalites". King George V was in attendance for the match. It was the first time a reigning monarch attended an FA Cup final. As it was an all-Lancashire final, the King wore a red Lancashire rose in his buttonhole.

== Match ==
=== Summary ===
King George V arrived shortly before kick-off at 3:30 pm; the players and the match officials lined up before the royal box and gave "three hearty cheers" for the King. Burnley captain Boyle won the coin toss and Liverpool's Miller kicked off the game, refereed by the 32-year-old Herbert Bamlett of Gateshead. The Burnley players had the wind at their backs in the first half, but faced the sun. In the first minute, Billy Watson passed the ball to Lindley, who shot against the crossbar of the Liverpool goal. Shortly afterwards Sewell, the Burnley goalkeeper, failed to clear the ball but Liverpool's Nicholl missed an almost open goal. Nicholl soon had another opportunity to score: his powerful shot was headed away by Taylor, who was temporarily knocked out. Taylor was praised by the Football Post for saving "a certain goal". Around the 20th minute, Miller put the ball in the Burnley net, but he was ruled offside by the referee. Combined play by the Liverpool forwards led to a powerful shot by Lacey, which was saved by Sewell. The first half ended goalless with Liverpool being the better side, although both sides created few goalscoring chances due to the solid performance of both teams' defences.

Both sides went on the attack during the first minutes of the second half without creating any major goalscoring chances. In the 58th minute, Hodgson headed the ball to Freeman, who put Burnley 1–0 ahead with a powerful half-volley from around 15 yards (14 m). Freeman struck the ball at chest level; the Burnley News labelled the goal as "one of the very finest ever scored in a Cup Final". The quality of play of both teams improved after the goal. Hodgson, the Burnley forward, hit the post of the Liverpool goal, and shortly afterwards, Sewell prevented Liverpool from equalising. Around the 75th minute, Boyle picked up an injury and was assisted off the pitch, only to return soon afterwards. Within a minute, Sewell prevented an equaliser from Metcalf. Eddie Mosscrop, one of the Burnley forwards, went through on goal but his shot went wide. A minute later Mosscrop crossed the ball to the unmarked Lindley, who failed to score. In the closing stages of the match, Sewell made several saves to preserve Burnley's lead. Burnley temporarily played with 10 men after Hodgson picked up an injury. With their one-man advantage, Liverpool almost equalised, but Burnley's Tom Bamford cleared the ball off the line after Sewell was beaten. Burnley held on to their 1–0 lead to win the cup. The King presented the trophy to Burnley's captain Boyle, and medals to each of the players from both teams. Boyle became the first footballer to receive the trophy from a reigning monarch.

=== Details ===
25 April 1914
15:30 BST

Burnley	1–0	Liverpool
Freeman 58'

Crystal Palace, London
Attendance: 72,778
Referee: Herbert Bamlett (Gateshead)

Burnley	Liverpool

GK	(England) Ronnie Sewell
DF	(England) Tom Bamford
DF	(Scotland) David Taylor
HB	(Scotland) George Halley
HB	(England) Tommy Boyle (c)
HB	(England) Billy Watson
OR	(England) Billy Nesbitt
IR	(England) Dick Lindley
CF	(England) Bert Freeman
IL	(England) Teddy Hodgson
OL	(England) Eddie Mosscrop
Manager:
(England) John Haworth

GK	(Scotland) Kenny Campbell
DF	(England) Ephraim Longworth
DF	(Scotland) Bob Pursell
HB	(Scotland) Tom Fairfoul
HB	(Scotland) Robert Ferguson (c)
HB	(Scotland) Donald McKinlay
OR	(England) Jackie Sheldon
IR	(England) Arthur Metcalf
CF	(Scotland) Tom Miller
IL	(Ireland) Bill Lacey
OL	(Scotland) James Nicholl
Manager:
(England) Tom Watson

== Post match and aftermath ==
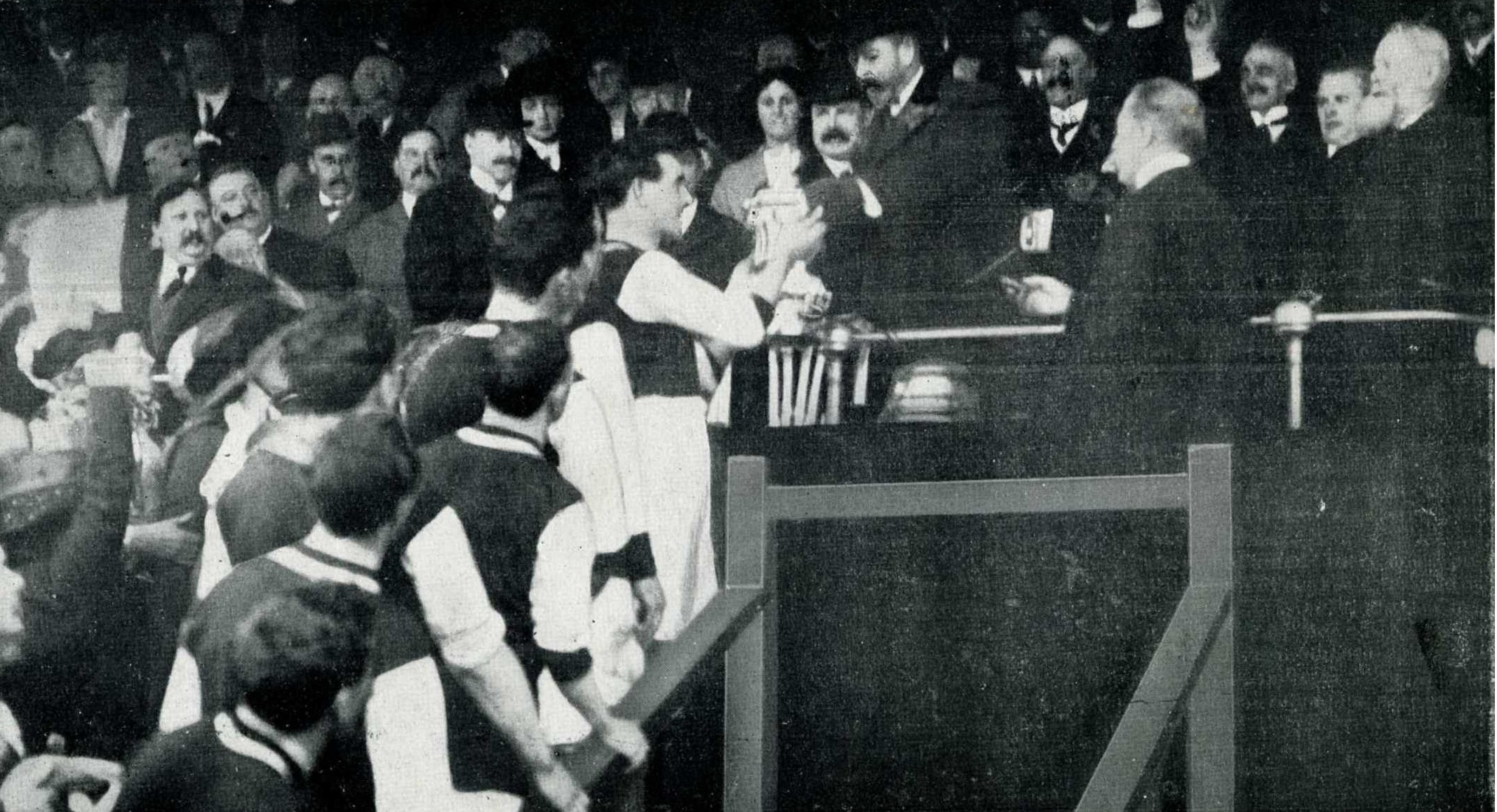
King George V presenting the FA Cup trophy to Burnley skipper Tommy Boyle, becoming the first footballer to receive the trophy from a reigning monarch

The 1913–14 FA Cup was Burnley's first major honour, and as of 2024 their only triumph in the competition. Liverpool would win their first FA Cup in 1965. By defeating Derby County, Bolton Wanderers, Sunderland, Sheffield United and Liverpool, Burnley became the first side to beat five First Division clubs in one cup season. King George V congratulated Burnley manager John Haworth on the victory by letter. Burnley received £3,717 from the Football Association for winning the cup; Liverpool received £2,393 for finishing as runners-up. The FA gave medals to Burnley's Dawson and Liverpool's Lowe, regular starters for their clubs who made no appearance in the final.

Various newspapers labelled the match as the "Royal Cup Final". Burnley captain Boyle claimed the better team won after "a good, clean, sporting game". Ferguson, Liverpool's captain, stated his side were "as good as" Burnley, but the latter had "the bit of luck necessary to win the Cup". The Times stated Burnley were the deserved victors. The Manchester Guardian labelled it a "clean" but "poor game" with many blunders, citing "Cup final nerves" and a dry and hard pitch as reasons. Several newspapers also claimed the players also struggled with the heat as it was very sunny. The People declared it an "average Cup Final", played with "an exceedingly lively ball" that made "ground passing a very difficult matter". The Manchester Courier suggested Boyle was the man of the match, highlighting his leadership throughout the game.

Although attendance figures for the final ranged between 72,000 and 100,000, the official attendance reported was 72,778. The People claimed that "according to the official return the attendance numbered 74,093". One of the people in attendance was Freeman's father, who had travelled 13,000 miles (21,000 km) from Australia to visit family. Outside the stadium, some fans perched on telegraph poles and sat in tall trees to have a view of the match. It was the last final played at Crystal Palace; the 1915 FA Cup final between Sheffield United and Chelsea was held at Old Trafford, Manchester, as Crystal Palace was used as a war depot during the First World War.

On 27 April, two days after the match, the Burnley team departed from London Euston at 10:30 am and arrived at Rose Grove railway station in Burnley in the afternoon. Burnley were welcomed back home by around 10,000 fans at the station, after which the team processed in waggonettes from the railway station to Turf Moor, led by two military brass bands and mounted police. The schools, shops and mills in Burnley were closed during the celebrations; 60,000 to 115,000 fans lined the streets of Burnley. The crowd was so dense that the Burnley team could not enter the Burnley Town Hall and made slow progress to the stadium, where they played Bradford City in the last league game of the season. In front of 40,000 spectators, Burnley came back from 2–0 down to draw 2–2 with City. The FA Cup trophy was paraded around Turf Moor.

The Liverpool team were welcomed back home by around 1,000 supporters at Liverpool Lime Street. On 27 April, Liverpool played Sheffield United in their last league match of the season. In front of 7,000 spectators at Anfield, Liverpool defeated the visitors 2–1 with two goals from Miller. On 29 April, Burnley and Liverpool met in a charity match at Anfield, proposed by Liverpool manager Tom Watson. In front of 10,000 spectators, Liverpool won by one goal to nil. The FA Cup trophy was paraded around the ground and both teams were photographed with the cup.

In 2014, 100 years after the final, an exhibition about Burnley's 1914 FA Cup triumph ran for four weeks at Towneley Hall in Burnley, featuring several artefacts such as photographs and the shirt won by Freeman during the final. On 26 April 2014, during their last home match of the season against Ipswich Town, Burnley wore a 1914 replica shirt bearing the royal coat of arms, after being granted permission from Buckingham Palace.
