= Bob Pursell (footballer, born 1889) =

Scottish footballer

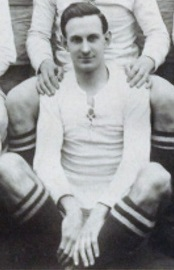
- Pursell in a Port Vale squad photo in 1920

Personal information
- Full name: Robert Russell Pursell
- Date of birth: 18 March 1889
- Place of birth: Campbeltown, Argyll and Bute, Scotland
- Date of death: 24 May 1974 (aged 85)
- Place of death: Glasgow, Scotland
- Height: 5 ft 11 in (1.80 m)
- Position: Fullback

Senior career*
Years	Team	Apps	(Gls)
- Aberdeen University
1909–1911	Queen's Park	50	(4)
1911–1915	Liverpool	97	(0)
1919–1920	Liverpool	2	(0)
1920–1922	Port Vale	66	(0)
Total		215	(4)
- * Club domestic league appearances and goals

Robert Russell Pursell (18 March 1889 – 24 May 1974) was a Scottish footballer who played for Liverpool in the early 20th century. He was the elder brother of Peter Pursell and uncle of the similarly named Robert Wilson Pursell. He played in the 1914 FA Cup final but was banned for life for his part in the 1915 British football betting scandal. However, his ban was lifted for his actions in World War I, and he went on to play for Port Vale before retiring with a broken leg in 1922.

== Career ==
=== Queen's Park ===
Born in Campbeltown, Argyll and Bute, Scotland, Pursell attended Aberdeen University before signing for Queen's Park. He scored on his Scottish League Division One debut for the "Spiders" on 28 August 1909, in a 2–2 draw with Heart of Midlothian at Hampden Park. He went on to make 33 appearances in the 1909–10 season, scoring two goals. He scored two goals in 25 games throughout the 1910–11 campaign, which saw Queen's Park finish bottom of the division.

=== Liverpool ===
Pucell was signed by Liverpool manager Tom Watson in April 1911 – although Queen's Park were amateurs, Liverpool were subsequently fined £250 for not asking the club's permission before approaching Pursell. A "cool and brainy full-back", he made his First Division debut a 2–1 victory over Sunderland at Roker Park on 30 September 1911. He made 26 appearances in 1911–12, a disappointing season for the "Reds" which saw the club avoiding relegation from the top-flight by finishing a single point over Preston North End, who went down with Bury. The following couple of seasons were to prove to be a testing time for Pursell as he failed to hold down a regular spot in the starting 11; he did, however, manage to play in all of Liverpool's eight cup ties, including the final, in their run to the 1914 FA Cup final. The game was to be played in front on a reigning monarch for the first time as King George V was to attend the last cup final to be played at the Crystal Palace Park on 25 April 1914. The first appearance in the final for both Liverpool and opponents Burnley, the "Clarets" won the match 1–0 thanks to a Bert Freeman goal.

On 2 April 1915, Liverpool lost 2–0 to Manchester United, Pursell giving away a penalty, and the game was judged to be fixed. After an investigation by the Football League, Pursell and three teammates – Tom Miller, Jackie Sheldon and Tom Fairfoul, were banned from football for life. The incident later became known as the '1915 British football betting scandal', in what was the first major betting scandal to hit the sport. For his service in World War I, Pursell's ban was lifted, allowing him to continue his career. Pursell never broke into the Liverpool starting line-up and was only selected twice during the 1919–20 season, both times at Anfield and both times against Liverpool's bitterest rivals, Man United on Boxing Day 1919 and Everton the following day. Pursell left Liverpool in May 1920, having made 112 appearances in all competitions for the "Reds".

=== Port Vale ===
He signed with Port Vale, thereby joining his brother Peter Pursell for the first time. The two played alongside each other, and were so moved by a public plea by chairman Frank Huntbach for supporters to buy shares in the club that they each bought £5 worth of shares. He made 38 Second Division appearances in 1920–21. The brothers hit their stride by 1922, allowing goalkeeper Teddy Peers to be little more than a spectator as the club went on a run of seven games without conceding a goal. However, 29 appearances into the 1921–22 campaign, he broke his leg in April 1922, causing his retirement the following month.

== Career statistics ==
Appearances and goals by club, season and competition
Club	Season	League			National cup (Note: Includes Scottish Cup, FA Cup)		Total	
Club	Season	Division	Apps	Goals	Apps	Goals	Apps	Goals
Queen's Park	1909–10	Scottish League Division One	27	2	6	0	33	2
Queen's Park	1910–11	Scottish League Division One	23	2	2	0	25	2
Queen's Park	Total		50	4	8	0	58	4
Liverpool	1911–12	First Division	24	0	2	0	26	0
Liverpool	1912–13	First Division	20	0	1	0	21	0
Liverpool	1913–14	First Division	26	0	8	0	34	0
Liverpool	1914–15	First Division	27	0	2	0	29	0
Liverpool	1919–20	First Division	2	0	0	0	2	0
Liverpool	Total		99	0	13	0	112	0
Port Vale	1920–21	Second Division	38	0	1	0	39	0
Port Vale	1921–22	Second Division	28	0	1	0	29	0
Port Vale	Total		66	0	2	0	68	0
Career total			215	4	23	0	238	4

== Honours ==
Liverpool

- FA Cup runner-up: 1914
