= Ronnie Sewell =

English footballer

Personal information
- Full name: Walter Ronald Sewell
- Date of birth: 19 July 1890
- Place of birth: Middlesbrough, England
- Date of death: 4 February 1945 (aged 54)
- Place of death: Lincoln, England
- Height: 5 ft 10 in (1.78 m)
- Position: Goalkeeper

Senior career*
Years	Team	Apps	(Gls)
1907–1910	Gainsborough Trinity	0	(0)
1910–1911	Wingate Albion		
1911–1913	Gainsborough Trinity	37	(0)
1913–1920	Burnley	23	(0)
1920–1927	Blackburn Rovers	227	(0)
1927–1929	Gainsborough Trinity		
- * Club domestic league appearances and goals

Walter Ronald Sewell (19 July 1890 – 4 February 1945) was an English professional footballer who played as a goalkeeper for Gainsborough Trinity, Burnley, Blackburn Rovers and England.

== Life and career ==
Sewell was born in Middlesbrough. He began his football career with Gainsborough Trinity of the Football League Second Division, but did not appear for the first team, and spent the 1910–11 season with North-Eastern League club Wingate Albion. In the summer of 1911 he returned to Gainsborough Trinity on professional terms, and immediately became a regular member of their first team in what proved to be the club's final season in the Football League, missing only one of the 38 League matches.

The following season he joined Burnley, for whom he appeared in their 1914 FA Cup Final victory against Liverpool, although he never really established himself as a first-team regular in a Turf Moor career which was interrupted by the First World War. In all, he made a total of only 23 Football League appearances for Burnley over a seven-year period.

During the 1919–20 season he was transferred to near-neighbours Blackburn Rovers, where he remained until 1927 and where he enjoyed the best of his football career, making 227 Football League appearances for the club and winning one full international cap for England. The match, against Wales on 3 March 1924, was played at Blackburn's Ewood Park ground, and England lost 2–1.

After leaving Blackburn Rovers, Sewell re-joined Gainsborough Trinity and was a member of their Midland League championship-winning side of 1927–28. Whilst playing for Gainsborough in an away Midland League match against Doncaster Rovers Reserves on 9 March 1929, he sustained a hand injury that eventually prompted his retirement from football. By the time his playing days ended, he had become licensee of the Cattle Market Hotel in Lincoln.

Sewell died in Lincoln County Hospital in 1945 aged 54.

== Honours ==
Burnley

- FA Cup: 1913–14
