= 1939–40 Carlisle United F.C. season =

Carlisle United F.C.
1939–40 season
- Manager: David Taylor
- Stadium: Brunton Park
- Third Division North: suspended due to war

For the 1939–40 season, Carlisle United F.C. competed in the Third Division North before the declaration of the Second World War suspended the Football League after two matches.

== Results & fixtures ==
=== Division Three North ===
==== League table ====
Pos	Team	Pld	W	D	L	GF	GA	GAv	Pts
10	Lincoln City	3	1	1	1	6	7	0.857	3
11	Rotherham United	3	1	1	1	5	6	0.833	3
12	Carlisle United	2	1	0	1	3	3	1.000	2
12	Hull City	2	0	2	0	3	3	1.000	2
14	Gateshead	3	1	0	2	6	7	0.857	2

Source: Football League Division 3 (North) Table 1939/40

==== Matches ====
Match Day	Date	Opponent	H/A	Score	Carlisle United Scorer(s)	Attendance
1	26 August	Oldham Athletic	A	1–3		
2	2 September	Stockport County	H	2–0		
