= George Ritchie =

George Ritchie may refer to:

- George Ritchie (moderator) (1808–1888), moderator of the General Assembly of the Church of Scotland in 1870
- George Ritchie (footballer, born 1904) (1904–1978), Scottish football wing half (Leicester City and others)
- George Ritchie (footballer, born 1889) (1889–1960), English football forward (Brighton, Reading)
- George Ritchie (organist), American organist
- George Ritchie (politician) (1864–1944), Australian politician
- George Ritchie (rugby union, born 1848) (1848–1896), Scottish rugby player
- George Ritchie (rugby union, born 1909) (1909–1993), Scottish rugby player
- George G. Ritchie (1923–2007), American psychiatrist and writer on near death experiences
- George Stephen Ritchie (1914–2012), British admiral and cartographer
