= David Taylor (footballer, born 1884) =

Scottish footballer

Personal information
- Date of birth: 5 August 1884
- Place of birth: St. Ninians, Scotland
- Date of death: 6 August 1949 (aged 65)
- Place of death: Bridge of Allan, Scotland
- Height: 5 ft 10 1/2 in (1.79 m)
- Positions: Left back; centre half

Senior career*
Years	Team	Apps	(Gls)
- Bannockburn Juniors
–1906	Ashfield		
1906–1910	Rangers	28	(0)
1909–1910	→ Motherwell (loan)	34	(4)
1910–1911	Bradford City	45	(1)
1911–1924	Burnley	221	(5)
1916	→ Ayr United (guest)	1	(0)
1916	→ Rangers (guest)	1	(0)
1916	→ Chelsea (guest)		
1918	→ Falkirk (guest)	2	(0)
1919	→ Celtic (guest)	5	(0)

Managerial career
- 1924–1931: St Johnstone
- 1936–1938: Dunfermline Athletic
- 1938–1940: Carlisle United
- * Club domestic league appearances and goals

David Taylor (5 August 1884 – 6 August 1949) was a Scottish professional football player and manager. As a player he was a defender, and won the FA Cup in 1911 with Bradford City and in 1914 with Burnley.

== Career ==
Moving from Rangers to Bradford City in September 1910, Taylor signed for Burnley in November 1911. With Bradford he won the 1911 FA Cup Final, and with Burnley he won the 1914 FA Cup Final and the 1920–21 Football League title. He was known for his pace.

Taylor guested for both Old Firm clubs during the First World War. He only featured for Celtic in five league matches but could be considered to have played an important part in their 1918–19 Scottish Football League title win, as in his debut on 1 January 1919 the Hoops held his old club Rangers to a 1–1 draw at Ibrox thanks to what was described in the press as "magnificent rearguard tactics", going on to win the championship from the same rivals by one point. At the end of that season, he suffered from serious heart trouble which put his career and health at risk, but was later able to continue with Burnley.

He played in two Home Scots v Anglo-Scots international trials just prior to the war, but never gained a full cap for Scotland.

He later moved back to Scotland to manage St Johnstone and Dunfermline Athletic, before returning to England to manage Carlisle United.

== Honours ==
Burnley

- FA Cup: 1913–14

== See also ==
- Played for Celtic and Rangers
