= Bob McDougall =

Scottish footballer

- Born: 1894
- Died: 1936
- Occupation: Professional Footballer

Bob McDougall (1894–1936) was a Scottish professional footballer, who played for St Cuthbert Wanderers, Dumfries, Liverpool, Ayr United, Falkirk and Queen of the South.

== Career ==
McDougall, who was from Kirkcudbright, began playing his football career with local side St Cuthbert Wanderers. McDougall then played for Dumfries at their Eastfield ground. He then went to Liverpool for whom he played in the 1913/14 FA Cup. He also played 7 league games scoring on his debut.

After World War I, McDougall gave service to Ayr United and Falkirk. He then returned to South West Scotland to play for the recently formed professional team in Dumfries, Queen of the South. At Queens in 1922–23 McDougall played alongside Joe Dodds in the last season when Queens played in a regional set up. Queens were unbeaten in winning the Western League that season.

With Bob McDermid also having joined them Bob McDougall was with Queen of the South entering the Scottish Football League in 1923–24 at its lowest level, the newly created Scottish Third Division, finishing a respectable third and winning the Scottish Qualifying Cup. After leaving Queen of the South, McDougall returned to St Cuthbert Wanderers.
