= John Bovill =

Scottish footballer (1886–1954)

Personal information
- Full name: John McKeown Bovill
- Date of birth: 21 March 1886
- Place of birth: Rutherglen, Scotland
- Date of death: 13 April 1954 (aged 68)
- Place of death: Rutherglen, Scotland
- Position: Forward

Senior career*
| Years | Team | Apps | (Gls) |
| – | Rutherglen Glencairn | | |
| – | Petershill | | |
| – | Strathclyde | | |
| 1907–1908 | Rangers | 2 | (0) |
| 1908 | Blackburn Rovers | 0 | (0) |
| 1908–1911 | Chesterfield Town | 18 (Note: Figures in box refer to the 1908–09 Football League only. Figures are also known for the two seasons Bovill played in the Midland League: an additional 77 appearances and 31 goals.) | (3) |
| 1911–1914 | Liverpool | 27 | (7) |
| 1914–1916 | Linfield | | |
- * Club domestic league appearances and goals

John McKeown Bovill (21 March 1886 – 13 April 1954) was a Scottish footballer who played as a forward.

Bovill started his professional career in Scotland with Rangers in December 1907, though he played for them only twice before he moved to England to play for Blackburn Rovers (no first team appearances) and then Chesterfield Town where he featured regularly. He stayed with the Spirites for two years in the Midland League after they lost their English Football League status, then was signed by Liverpool. Bovill made 29 appearances for the Anfield club, with 25 of those coming in the 1911–12 season.

He left Liverpool in May 1914 and then joined the army: he was stationed in Ireland with the Royal Irish Rifles and played for Linfield for two full seasons and part of a third, scoring the winning goal in the Irish Cup final of 1915 and winning the same trophy again a year later, as well as victories in the 1915–16 Belfast & District League and the 1916 Gold Cup. He left for the Western Front in December 1916 and was gassed in the trenches in 1917, but recovered and survived to the age of 68 living in his home town of Rutherglen.
