= James Nicholl =

Scottish footballer

Personal information
- Date of birth: 12 January 1887
- Place of birth: Port Glasgow, Scotland
- Date of death: 21 December 1948 (aged 61)
- Place of death: Carluke, Scotland
- Position: Forward

Senior career*
Years	Team	Apps	(Gls)
- Morningside Rangers
1907–1908	Wishaw Thistle		
1908–1910	Airdrieonians	40	(12)
1910–1914	Middlesbrough	52	(13)
1914–1917	Liverpool	52	(12)
1915	→ Wishaw Thistle (loan)		
1917	Hamilton Academical	9	(1)
- * Club domestic league appearances and goals

James Nicholl (12 January 1887 – 21 December 1948) was a Scottish footballer who played mainly as an outside left.

After starting his professional football career with Airdrieonians, he moved to England in 1910 to join Middlesbrough. During his time at Middlesbrough, Nicholl made 56 appearances, and scored 13 goals. In January 1914, he signed for Liverpool, where he played at Anfield for eighteen(18) months. Nicholl notably featured in the 1914 FA Cup Final, (having scored both his team's goals to win the semi-final victory). However, his career in England was ended by the outbreak of World War I. Afterward, he returned to Scotland and had a brief spell with Hamilton Academical.
