= 1915 British football match-fixing scandal =

The 1915 British football betting scandal occurred when a Football League First Division match between Manchester United and Liverpool at Old Trafford on 2 April (Good Friday) 1915 was fixed in United's favour, with players from both sides benefiting from bets placed upon the result. In all, seven players were found to have participated in the scandal and were banned for life, although most later had their bans overturned.

== The match ==
At the time of the match, Manchester United were struggling to avoid relegation, while Liverpool were in mid-table and neither challenging for honours nor facing the threat of relegation themselves. The effects of the First World War provided further motivation to perpetrate a fix – by the end of March it was almost certain that the league would suspend operations after the 1914–15 season was finished, interrupting and possibly ending the footballing careers of everyone then playing in the league. Also, the players perhaps thought that the diversion of the conflict would lessen the attention that would normally be paid to a dubious match result.

The match ended in a 2–0 win to United, with George Anderson scoring both goals. However, the match referee and some observers noted Liverpool's lack of commitment during the game – they had missed a penalty that had been awarded to them, and when Fred Pagnam hit the Manchester United crossbar late in the match, his teammates publicly remonstrated with him.

== Investigation and punishments ==
After the match, handbills started to appear, alleging that a large amount of money had been bet at odds of 7/1 on a 2–0 win to United. The Football Association launched an investigation and found that players from both sides had been involved in rigging the match: Sandy Turnbull, Arthur Whalley and Enoch West of United, and Jackie Sheldon, Tom Miller, Bob Pursell and Thomas Fairfoul of Liverpool; Sheldon was a former United player himself and was found to be the plot's ringleader. Some players, such as Pagnam and United's George Anderson, had refused to take part. Pagnam had threatened to score a goal to ruin the result, hence his late shot against the crossbar; he later testified against his team-mates at the FA hearing. At the same hearing, United player Billy Meredith denied any knowledge of the match-fixing, but stated that he became suspicious when none of his teammates would pass the ball to him.

All seven players were banned from playing for life in a decision handed down on 27 December 1915. The FA concluded that it had been a conspiracy by the players alone – no official from either club was found guilty of wrongdoing, and neither club was fined or had points deducted. West vociferously protested his innocence, even going so far as suing the FA for libel. However, he lost the case and the ban stood. In itself, the ban had no immediate effect on the players' footballing careers, as by that point the Football League had suspended operations for the duration of the First World War. The ban did not apply in Scotland (four of the suspended players were Scottish); however the Scottish Football Association was never called upon to issue any sort of ruling on the players' eligibility there.

Sandy Turnbull was killed while serving in the war, but all the other players, except West, had their bans lifted by the FA in 1919 in recognition of their service to the country; Turnbull received a posthumous reinstatement. The intervention of the First World War meant that the Football League did not resume until 1919–20. This meant that West was the only player involved who was actually unable to play League football due to suspension. Fairfoul also did not return to football although he was re-instated, however the other four players resumed their careers after the war. West had to wait until 1945 for his ban to be lifted, by which time he was 59.

== Consequences ==
Although the players' main motives for the match-fixing appear to have been financial, and not to save United from relegation, the two points United won from that game were enough to earn them 18th place and safety, one point ahead of 19th-placed Chelsea, who were nominally relegated. Before the 1919–20 season started, the League decided to expand the First Division by two teams; Chelsea (along with Arsenal) were elected back into the First Division and thus spared the drop.

== See also ==
- 1964 British betting scandal – A similar betting scandal nearly 50 years later.
- 2011 Turkish sports corruption scandal – Association football and political scandal
