= Ralph Holden =

English footballer

Personal information
- Date of birth: 1890
- Place of birth: Blundellsands, England
- Position: Half-back

Senior career*
Years	Team	Apps	(Gls)
1909–1910	St Helens Recreation		
1913	Liverpool	2	(0)
1914–1915	Tranmere Rovers		
- * Club domestic league appearances and goals

Ralph Holden (born 1890) was an English footballer who played as a midfielder.
