= George Ritchie (footballer, born 1889) =

English footballer (1889–1960)

Personal information
- Full name: George Wight Ritchie
- Date of birth: 1889
- Place of birth: West Derby, England
- Date of death: 6 December 1960 (aged 71)
- Place of death: Manchester, England
- Height: 5 ft 9 in (1.75 m)
- Position: Forward

Senior career*
Years	Team	Apps	(Gls)
- Rossendale United
- Chester
19??–1913	Preston North End	0	(0)
1913–1915	Norwich City		
1919–1921	Brighton & Hove Albion	21	(6)
1921–1922	Reading	16	(4)
1922–192?	Northfleet United		
- * Club domestic league appearances and goals

George Wight Ritchie (1889 – 6 December 1960) was an English professional footballer who played as a forward in the Football League for Brighton & Hove Albion and Reading.

Ritchie was born in 1889 in West Derby, Lancashire, which later became part of Liverpool. He was on the books of Preston North End without appearing in their league team, played Southern League football for Norwich City and Brighton & Hove Albion, guested for Liverpool during the First World War, and played non-league football for clubs including Rossendale United, Chester and Northfleet United. He died in Manchester in December 1960 at the age of 71.

== Personal life ==
Ritchie served as a guardsman in the Grenadier Guards during the First World War.
