= Robert Ferguson (footballer, born 1884) =

Scottish footballer

Personal information
- Date of birth: 2 October 1884
- Place of birth: Cleland, Lanarkshire, Scotland
- Date of death: 1962 (aged 77–78)
- Place of death: United States
- Height: 5 ft 10 1/2 in (1.79 m)
- Position: Centre half

Youth career
- Cleland Rangers

Senior career*
Years	Team	Apps	(Gls)
1906–1912	Third Lanark	185	(7)
1912–1915	Liverpool	92	(1)
- * Club domestic league appearances and goals

Robert Ferguson (2 October 1884 – 1962) was a Scottish footballer who played for Liverpool early in the 20th century.

== Life and playing career ==
Born in Cleland, North Lanarkshire, Ferguson played for Third Lanark for six years before he was signed by manager Tom Watson for Liverpool in 1912. Ferguson made his debut on 4 September 1912 in a First Division match at Anfield against Oldham, a game that saw the Reds win 2–0, He scored his first goal the following month on 19 October in a 4–1 home league win over Blackburn. Robert was an ever present for the rest of the season, the only player in the Liverpool ranks to do so.

Ferguson was a reliable, hard-working defender during the period leading up to World War I of 1914–18, but during the 1914–15 campaign he lost his place to Donald McKinlay and never really gained it back, Ferguson's Anfield contract ended in 1915 after he had made 103 appearances, scoring two goals.

=== Career details ===
- Liverpool F.C (1912–1915) 103 appearances, 2 goals
- 1913–14 FA Cup Runners-up medal
