= James Dawson (footballer, born 1890) =

Scottish footballer

Personal information
- Full name: James Maxwell Dawson
- Date of birth: 13 August 1890
- Place of birth: Edinburgh, Scotland
- Date of death: 1933 (aged 42–43)
- Position: Striker

Senior career*
Years	Team	Apps	(Gls)
1911–1913	Leith Athletic	14	(2)
1912–1915	Liverpool	13	(3)
1917–1919	Heart of Midlothian	26	(8)
1918–1919	Dumbarton	6	(0)
1920–1921	Albion Rovers	10	(1)
1921–1922	Alloa Athletic	10	(0)
1922–1923	St Mirren	1	(0)
1922–1923	Bo'ness	5	(0)
- * Club domestic league appearances and goals

James Dawson (13 August 1890 – 1933) was a Scottish professional footballer who played as a striker.

== Career ==
He scored three goals in 13 league appearances for Liverpool in the 1913–14 season. He also played for Leith Athletic, Hearts, Dumbarton, Albion Rovers, Alloa Athletic, St Mirren and Bo'ness.
