= Kenny Campbell =

Scottish footballer

Personal information
- Date of birth: 6 September 1892
- Place of birth: Cambuslang, Scotland
- Date of death: 28 April 1977 (aged 84)
- Place of death: Macclesfield, England
- Height: 5 ft 10 in (1.78 m)
- Position: Goalkeeper

Youth career
- Clyde Vale

Senior career*
Years	Team	Apps	(Gls)
1908–1910	Rutherglen Glencairn		
1910–1911	Cambuslang Rangers		
1911–1920	Liverpool	125	(0)
1919	→ Partick Thistle (loan)	1	(0)
1920–1922	Partick Thistle	76	(0)
1922–1923	New Brighton		
1923–1925	Stoke City	35	(0)
1925–1929	Leicester City	79	(0)
1929–1931	New Brighton	55	(0)
Total		295	(0)

International career
1916	Scotland (wartime)	1	(0)
1920–1922	Scotland	8	(0)
1921	Scottish League XI	1	(0)
- * Club domestic league appearances and goals

Kenneth Campbell (6 September 1892 – 28 April 1977) was a Scottish footballer, who played as a goalkeeper for Liverpool, Partick Thistle, New Brighton, Stoke City and Leicester City. Campbell also played in eight full international matches for Scotland between 1920 and 1922.

== Club career ==
=== Liverpool ===
Born in Cambuslang, Lanarkshire, Scotland, Campbell played for local Junior-grade teams Rutherglen Glencairn and Cambuslang Rangers in his early years; he won the Glasgow Junior League with the latter and twice represented Scotland at that level.

Liverpool manager Tom Watson brought him to Anfield in May 1911. In a contemporary interview he credited Donald McKinlay (a childhood acquaintance from his hometown) in assisting him during his early days at the club.

Campbell did not make his debut until 10 February 1912 in a Division One match at Ewood Park, a game that saw the Reds lose to Blackburn Rovers 1–0. Known for having safe hands, the goalkeeper took over from Sam Hardy after Hardy moved to Aston Villa, and proved to be just as secure as Liverpool's last line of defence. He only missed one game during the 1912–13 season, before he was replaced by his young understudy, Elisha Scott.

Campbell did put up a decent fight for the number 1 jersey, playing in all but four games of the 1913–14 campaign, and he was between the sticks for the 1914 FA Cup Final at the Crystal Palace ground on 25 April. The game finished disappointingly for Liverpool, in a 1–0 defeat to Burnley. The match was to be the last to be played at this venue and it was played in front of a reigning monarch for the very first time, George V. Like many footballers of his era, Campbell's career was interrupted for four years due to the First World War. However, upon returning to the game in 1919, he regained his position as Liverpool's number one. He stayed there until April 1920, when he played what turned out to be his last game for the club.

=== Later career ===
Campbell left Liverpool in April 1920, returning to Scotland to play for Partick Thistle for a fee of £1750 where he played in the club's underdog victory in the 1921 Scottish Cup – still the only occasion they have won the trophy.

He returned south of the border to New Brighton (primarily for family reasons, as they had remained on Merseyside when he went to Partick) before joining Stoke City in 1923. Campbell was used as second choice 'keeper to Bob Dixon and in his four seasons spent at the Victoria Ground he made 35 appearances. He then spent another four seasons at Leicester City before ending his career with a two-year spell with old club New Brighton.

== International career ==
Campbell was capped eight times by Scotland (four times while at Liverpool and four while at Partick), his debut coming in a British Home Championship match at Ninian Park, Cardiff against Wales in 1920; the game finished in a 1–1 draw.

He had also been selected in an unofficial wartime international in May 1916 (the only game of this nature during the course of the war itself).

== Career statistics ==
=== Club ===
Club	Season	League			Cup		Total	
Club	Season	Division	Apps	Goals	Apps	Goals	Apps	Goals
Liverpool	1911–12	First Division	7	0	0	0	7	0
Liverpool	1912–13	First Division	37	0	4	0	41	0
Liverpool	1913–14	First Division	34	0	8	0	42	0
Liverpool	1914–15	First Division	15	0	0	0	15	0
Liverpool	1919–20	First Division	32	0	5	0	37	0
Liverpool	Total		125	0	17	0	142	0
Partick Thistle	1919–20	Scottish Division One	4	0	0	0	4	0
Partick Thistle	1920–21	Scottish Division One	38	0	10	0	48	0
Partick Thistle	1921–22	Scottish Division One	34	0	5	0	39	0
Partick Thistle	Total		76	0	15	0	91	0
Stoke City	1922–23	First Division	8	0	0	0	8	0
Stoke City	1923–24	Second Division	11	0	0	0	11	0
Stoke City	1924–25	Second Division	9	0	0	0	9	0
Stoke City	1925–26	Second Division	7	0	0	0	7	0
Stoke City	Total		35	0	0	0	35	0
Leicester City	1925–26	First Division	26	0	1	0	27	0
Leicester City	1926–27	First Division	39	0	1	0	40	0
Leicester City	1927–28	First Division	6	0	0	0	6	0
Leicester City	1928–29	First Division	8	0	0	0	8	0
Leicester City	Total		79	0	2	0	81	0
New Brighton	1929–30	Third Division North	26	0	2	0	28	0
New Brighton	1930–31	Third Division North	29	0	1	0	30	0
New Brighton	Total		55	0	3	0	58	0
Career Total			370	0	37	0	407	0

=== International ===
National team	Year	Apps	Goals
Scotland	1920	3	0
Scotland	1921	2	0
Scotland	1922	3	0
Total		8	0

== See also ==
- List of Scotland national football team captains
- List of Scotland wartime international footballers
