= Arthur Metcalf =

English footballer

Personal information
- Date of birth: 8 April 1889
- Place of birth: Sunderland, England
- Date of death: 9 February 1936 (aged 46)
- Place of death: Liverpool, England
- Position: Forward

Youth career
- St George's
- 1907–1908: Herrington Swifts
- 1908–1909: Hebburn Argyle
- 1909: North Shields Athletic

Senior career*
Years	Team	Apps	(Gls)
1909–1912	Newcastle United	12	(2)
1912–1918	Liverpool	52	(23)
1918–1920	Stockport County	36	(13)
1920–1922	Swindon Town	31	(6)
1922–1923	Accrington Stanley	31	(18)
1923–1925	Aberdare Athletic	72	(10)
1925–1926	Norwich City	2	(0)
- * Club domestic league appearances and goals

Arthur Metcalf (8 April 1889 – 9 February 1936) was an English professional footballer who played as a forward.

== Career ==
Metcalf played for a number of amateur clubs in the north-east, before earning a professional contract with Newcastle United in 1909. He could not break into the first team at St. James' Park, however, only making twelve first team appearances before joining Liverpool in 1912. His time at Anfield was largely successful, he finished as the club's top scorer in his first season with 28 goals, and featured in the FA Cup final a year later. Injury struck, however, and he missed much of the 1914–15 season. He was prolific during wartime football, but was not offered a new contract at the end of the conflict, and went on to have a journeyman career, playing for five more clubs before retiring in 1926. His brother, George, was also a professional footballer.

== Personal life ==
Metcalf served in the Royal Navy during the First World War.
