= William Banks (footballer) =

English footballer

William Banks (6 December 1893 – 20 March 1963) was an English footballer who played as a defender for Liverpool in The Football League. Banks started his career at Hartford Burdon in the Bluthe and District League before he was signed by professional team Ashington. He then moved to Tranmere Rovers and then on to Liverpool. He made his debut towards the end of the 1913–14 season featuring in nine of the last eleven games of the season. He made a further seventeen appearances before the advent of the First World War, which interrupted his career. Following the end of the war he signed for Tranmere again. He later moved to Fulham where he played 43 matches between 1919 and 1921, scoring 12 goals.
