= 1914–15 in English football =

Football in England
- Season: 1914–15

The magazine Punch was critical of the decision to allow competitive football to continue after the outbreak of war. Mr Punch is depicted saying to the footballer "No doubt you can make money in this field, my friend, but there's only one field today where you can get honour".

The 1914–15 season was the 44th season of competitive football in England.

== Overview ==
The 1914 Charity Shield was not contested due to suspension of football during World War I.

== Events ==
- Suspicious patterns of betting on the game between Liverpool and Manchester United led to allegations of match fixing and the 1915 British football betting scandal. Eventually seven players (three from United, four from Liverpool) were banned from football.
- The Middlesbrough v Oldham Athletic match on the 3rd of April 1915 was abandoned after 55 minutes when Oldham fullback Billy Cook refused to leave the field after being sent off. The result was allowed to stand as Middlesbrough were leading 4-1. Cook was suspended for 12 months.
- Tom Watson, Liverpool's manager for the last 19 years, died on 6 May 1915.

== Honours ==
First Division	Everton (2)
Second Division	Derby County
Southern League	Watford
FA Cup	Sheffield United (3)

Notes = Number in parentheses is the times that club has won that honour. * indicates new record for competition

== League tables ==
=== Football League First Division ===
Pos	Team	Pld	W	D	L	GF	GA	GAv	Pts	Relegation
1	Everton (C)	38	19	8	11	76	47	1.617	46	
2	Oldham Athletic	38	17	11	10	70	56	1.250	45	
3	Blackburn Rovers	38	18	7	13	83	61	1.361	43	
4	Burnley	38	18	7	13	61	47	1.298	43	
5	Manchester City	38	15	13	10	49	39	1.256	43	
6	Sheffield United	38	15	13	10	49	41	1.195	43	
7	The Wednesday	38	15	13	10	61	54	1.130	43	
8	Sunderland	38	18	5	15	81	72	1.125	41	
9	Bradford (Park Avenue)	38	17	7	14	69	65	1.062	41	
10	West Bromwich Albion	38	15	10	13	49	43	1.140	40	
11	Bradford City	38	13	14	11	55	49	1.122	40	
12	Middlesbrough	38	13	12	13	62	74	0.838	38	
13	Liverpool	38	14	9	15	65	75	0.867	37	
14	Aston Villa	38	13	11	14	62	72	0.861	37	
15	Newcastle United	38	11	10	17	46	48	0.958	32	
16	Notts County	38	9	13	16	41	57	0.719	31	
17	Bolton Wanderers	38	11	8	19	68	84	0.810	30	
18	Manchester United	38	9	12	17	46	62	0.742	30	
19	Chelsea	38	8	13	17	51	65	0.785	29	
20	Tottenham Hotspur (R)	38	8	12	18	57	90	0.633	28	Relegation to the Second Division

Source: World Football
Rules for classification: 1) Points; 2) Goal average; 3) Goals scored
(C) Champions; (R) Relegated

=== Football League Second Division ===
Pos	Team	Pld	W	D	L	GF	GA	GAv	Pts	Promotion or relegation
1	Derby County (C, P)	38	23	7	8	71	33	2.152	53	Promotion to the First Division
2	Preston North End (P)	38	20	10	8	61	42	1.452	50	Promotion to the First Division
3	Barnsley	38	22	3	13	51	51	1.000	47	
4	Wolverhampton Wanderers	38	19	7	12	77	52	1.481	45	
5	Arsenal (P)	38	19	5	14	69	41	1.683	43 (Note: The official Football League records originally showed Birmingham in 5th place and Arsenal in 6th place. In 1975 it was discovered that an error in the calculation of Goal Average had been made and the table was corrected.)	Promotion to the First Division
6	Birmingham	38	17	9	12	62	39	1.590	43	
7	Hull City	38	19	5	14	65	54	1.204	43	
8	Huddersfield Town	38	17	8	13	61	42	1.452	42	
9	Clapton Orient	38	16	9	13	50	48	1.042	41	
10	Blackpool	38	17	5	16	58	57	1.018	39	
11	Bury	38	15	8	15	61	56	1.089	38	
12	Fulham	38	15	7	16	53	47	1.128	37	
13	Bristol City	38	15	7	16	62	56	1.107	37	
14	Stockport County	38	15	7	16	54	60	0.900	37	
15	Leeds City	38	14	4	20	65	64	1.016	32	
16	Lincoln City	38	11	9	18	46	65	0.708	31	
17	Grimsby Town	38	11	9	18	48	76	0.632	31	
18	Nottingham Forest	38	10	9	19	43	77	0.558	29	
19	Leicester Fosse	38	10	4	24	47	88	0.534	24	Re-elected
20	Glossop (R)	38	6	6	26	31	87	0.356	18	Failed re-election and demoted

(C) Champions; (P) Promoted; (R) Relegated

=== Southern League Division 1 ===
Pos	Team	Pld	W	D	L	GF	GA	GR	Pts	Qualification or relegation
1	Watford	38	22	8	8	68	46	1.478	52	
2	Reading	38	21	7	10	68	43	1.581	49	
3	Cardiff City	38	22	4	12	72	38	1.895	48	
4	West Ham United	38	18	9	11	58	47	1.234	45	Elected to the 1919–20 Football League Second Division after World War I
5	Northampton Town	38	19	5	14	56	51	1.098	43	
6	Southampton	38	19	5	14	78	74	1.054	43	
7	Portsmouth	38	16	10	12	54	42	1.286	42	
8	Millwall	38	16	10	12	50	51	0.980	42	
9	Swindon Town	38	15	11	12	77	59	1.305	41	
10	Brighton & Hove Albion	38	16	7	15	46	47	0.979	39	
11	Exeter City	38	15	8	15	50	41	1.220	38	
12	Queens Park Rangers	38	13	12	13	55	56	0.982	38	
13	Norwich City	38	11	14	13	53	56	0.946	36	
14	Luton Town	38	13	8	17	61	73	0.836	34	
15	Crystal Palace	38	13	8	17	47	61	0.770	34	
16	Bristol Rovers	38	14	3	21	53	75	0.707	31	
17	Plymouth Argyle	38	8	14	16	51	61	0.836	30	
18	Southend United	38	10	8	20	44	64	0.688	28	
19	Croydon Common	38	9	9	20	47	63	0.746	27	Relegated to Division Two, but did not rejoin league after World War I
20	Gillingham	38	6	8	24	43	83	0.518	20	

Rules for classification: The system of using goal average to separate two teams tied on points was used up until the 1976–77 season. The points system: 2 points for a win, 1 point for a draw and 0 points for losing.

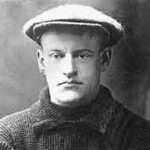
Goalkeeper Skilly Williams played every game for Watford.

== See also ==
- England national football team results (unofficial matches)
