= Fred Pagnam =

English footballer and manager

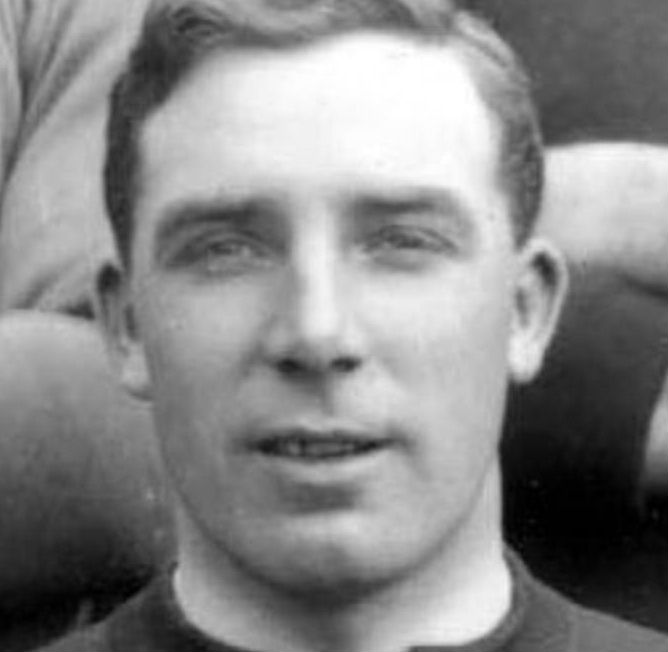

Personal information
- Full name: Fred Pagnam
- Date of birth: 4 September 1891
- Place of birth: Poulton-le-Fylde, Lancashire, England
- Date of death: 1 March 1962 (aged 70)
- Place of death: Samlesbury, Lancashire, England
- Height: 5 ft 9 in (1.75 m)
- Position: Forward

Youth career
- Birchall BC

Senior career*
Years	Team	Apps	(Gls)
- Lytham
1909–1910	Blackpool Wednesday		
1910–1912	Huddersfield Town	0	(0)
1912	Doncaster Rovers		
1912–1913	Southport Central		
1913–1914	Blackpool	23	(1)
- Gainsborough Trinity
1914–1919	Liverpool	37	(28)
1919–1921	Arsenal	50	(26)
1921	Cardiff City	27	(8)
1921–1926	Watford	144	(67)
Total		281	(130)

Managerial career
- 1926–1929: Watford
- 1931–1932: Galatasaray
- 1932: Turkey
- 1934–1937: DWV
- 1935: HVV Den Haag
- 1937–1939: De Volewijckers
- 1939: CVV Vriendenschaar
- * Club domestic league appearances and goals

Fred Pagnam (4 September 1891 – 1 March 1962) was an English footballer and manager. Pagnam played as a forward in the Football League for clubs Huddersfield Town, Blackpool, Liverpool, Arsenal, Cardiff City and Watford, and in non-league football for Lytham, Blackpool Wednesday, Doncaster Rovers, Southport Central and Gainsborough Trinity. As manager, he took charge of Watford, Galatasaray, the Turkey national team, and several clubs in the Netherlands.

== Playing career ==
Pagnam, the son of a bank manager, was born in Poulton-le-Fylde, Lancashire, where he attended Baines Grammar School. He played football for Birchall Boys' Club and for non-league clubs Lytham and Blackpool Wednesday before joining Huddersfield Town in 1910. He played for the reserves but not for the first team, and after a spell with Doncaster Rovers of the Midland League, he joined Southport Central of the Central League. By early 1913, the club was struggling financially, and the directors offered the players a choice: a wage cut or a free transfer. Pagnam took the latter, and moved on to Blackpool. He scored just once in 23 Second Division appearances, spent time with another Midland League team, Gainsborough Trinity, and signed for Liverpool in 1914.

Pagnam scored on his Reds debut, against Chelsea on 10 October 1914, and scored four against Tottenham Hotspur a couple of weeks later. He went on to score 26 goals that season and was Liverpool's top scorer.

His time at Liverpool coincided with a conspiracy by some Liverpool players to rig a match with Manchester United. This was in order to profit from betting on the result, in what became known as the 1915 British football betting scandal. Pagnam refused to take part in the conspiracy and even threatened to score a goal to ruin the prearranged result. United won 2–0 as agreed, but four Liverpool players and three United players were eventually found guilty of match-fixing by the Football Association, with Pagnam testifying against his teammates.

The outbreak of the First World War meant competitive football was suspended at the end of the 1914–15 season. Pagnam continued to play for Liverpool during the war, as well as making guest appearances for teams including Arsenal, Belfast Celtic and Blackpool. When football resumed after hostilities ceased, he played only eight more matches for the club before being sold to Arsenal for a £1,500 fee in October 1919.

Pagnam made his Arsenal debut against Bradford City on 25 October 1919. He was moderately prolific in his first season, scoring twelve League goals, although Harry White finished higher in the scoring charts. The next season, 1920–21, Pagnam finished as Arsenal's top scorer with 14 goals, despite having been sold to Cardiff City in March 1921 for £3,000 – Arsenal were quite strapped for cash at the time. In all he scored 27 goals in 53 appearances for Arsenal.

He lasted just nine months at Cardiff. His six goals from 14 appearances helped them gain promotion to the First Division in their first season in the Football League, but he was less successful at the higher level, and moved on to Watford of the Third Division South in December 1921 for a club-record fee of £1,000. In five seasons and 144 league matches, he scored 67 goals (74 from 157 appearances in all competitions) for Watford, and was the Third Division South top scorer in 1922–23 with 30 goals.

== Managerial career ==
In 1926, Pagnam became Watford's manager; he spent three years in the job but achieved little. Watford finished 21st out of 22 in his first season but improved to 8th in 1928–29. After leaving Watford, he managed Galatasaray and the Turkey national team. Pagnam then coached in the Netherlands at DWV, HVV Den Haag, De Volewijckers, HFC Haarlem and CVV Vriendenschaar.

== Personal life ==
Pagnam served in the Royal Garrison Artillery and the London Regiment during the First World War. He was declared a deserter on 20 April 1918. At the outbreak of the Second World War, he returned to the UK with his wife to run a pub. Pagnam died in 1962 aged 70.

== Honours ==
=== As a player ===
Watford

- Third Division South top scorer: 1922–23
