= 1919–20 Football League =

28th season of the Football League

The Football League
- Season: 1919–20
- Champions: West Bromwich Albion
- Relegated: Lincoln City
- Expelled: Leeds City
- New Clubs in League: Coventry City; Stoke; West Ham United; South Shields; Rotherham County; Port Vale (Mid-season)

The 1919–20 season was the 28th season of The Football League, and the first season after football was suspended after the outbreak of the First World War.

Compared to 1914–15, the number of Football League member clubs increased from 40 to 44, initially with five new clubs.

== Team changes ==
Resuming after four years, the Football League expanded its numbers by four, maintaining competition in two Divisions of equal size. During previous such expansions, 1898 and 1905, the relegated clubs from the previous season were re-elected, while the top Second Division sides were promoted as usual.

Following that precedent, the two top Second Division sides in 1915, Derby and Preston, did move on up. Chelsea, which had finished 19th that First Division season, was, as expected, re-elected.

Discussion of how the expansion should be handled began on 13 January 1919, when James Catton published an article in Athletic News raising the issue of match-fixing; this had dogged the 1914/15 League season and been left unresolved because of the cessation of the League for the duration of the war.

In the article, Catton argued one of the two clubs that ought to be returned to the first division (if that league was to be expanded, as had already been proposed) should be Chelsea, for it had been relegated due to the match-fixing. Catton then considered the argument that Tottenham, who had also been relegated with Chelsea should likewise be reinstated, although he noted there was nothing to link Tottenham's relegation with anything amiss in the final season before the cessation of the League for the duration.

In 1915, Manchester United avoided relegation by winning a game against Liverpool 2–0 on 2 April 1915 which was fixed in United's favour, with players from both sides benefiting from bets placed upon the result (see 1915 British football betting scandal). At the end of the season, Manchester United finished one point and one place ahead of Chelsea. Had the game against Liverpool ended in a draw, Chelsea would have finished ahead of United on goal average; if Liverpool had won, then Chelsea would have finished one place and one point ahead of Manchester United.

Arsenal, who had finished 6th in the Second Division in 1914-15 (later amended to 5th place in 1975 after an error in the calculation of goal average was discovered) were also elected to the First Division.

It has been alleged that Arsenal chairman Sir Henry Norris bribed or in some way unduly influenced the voting members of the Football League, and that Football League President John McKenna made a speech at the League's AGM recommending Arsenal's promotion ahead of Spurs thanks to the former's longer spell in the League (Arsenal joined in 1893, Spurs in 1908)—although Wolves, which finished ahead of Arsenal, had been a member of the League since its inception in 1888. However, detailed reports of the meeting in The Sportsman, Athletic News, Daily Mirror and The Times the following day made no mention of this. They did report that Football League Management Committee member C. E. Sutcliffe made a speech stating that the expansion would give them an opportunity to do right by Chelsea. It would seem strange if such a speech were made by the League President and somehow all the media failed to report it. Arsenal has not been relegated from the top flight of the English game since that time; it is the only club in continuous membership since 1919. Nine clubs applied for the two available promotion places:

- Arsenal
- Barnsley
- Birmingham City
- Chelsea
- Hull City
- Nottingham Forest
- Stockport County
- Tottenham Hotspur
- Wolverhampton Wanderers

In the Second Division, Port Vale took over from Leeds City after 4 October 1919, when Leeds were disbanded by F.A. order following alleged irregular practices. Port Vale then inherited Leeds' record up to that date.

After the season, Grimsby Town were relegated to the newly formed Third Division. Lincoln City was not re-elected to Second Division and Leeds United was elected to replace it. Cardiff City were elected to take the second available place in Second Division.

== Final league tables ==
Beginning in the 1894–95 season, clubs finishing level on points were separated according to goal average (goals scored divided by goals conceded). In case one or more teams had the same goal difference, this system favoured those teams who had scored fewer goals. The goal average system was eventually scrapped beginning with the 1976–77 season.

During the first six seasons of the league, (up to the 1893–94 season), re-election process concerned the clubs which finished in the bottom four of the league. From the 1894–95 season and until the 1920–21 season the re-election process was required of the clubs which finished in the bottom three of the league.

== First Division ==
First Division
- Season: 1919–20
- Champions: West Bromwich Albion; 1st English title
- Relegated: Notts County; The Wednesday
- Matches: 462
- Goals: 1,332 (2.88 per match)
- Top goalscorer: Fred Morris (37 goals)
- Biggest home win: West Bromwich Albion 8–0 Notts County (25 October 1919)
- Biggest away win: Preston North End 1–5 Bradford City (1 September 1919); Burnley 2–6 Bradford Park Avenue (22 November 1919); Derby County 0–4 West Bromwich Albion (20 December 1919); Bradford Park Avenue 0–4 West Bromwich Albion (3 April 1920)
- Highest scoring: Manchester City 8–2 Blackburn Rovers (8 November 1919)

Pos	Team	Pld	W	D	L	GF	GA	GAv	Pts	Relegation
1	West Bromwich Albion (C)	42	28	4	10	104	47	2.213	60	
2	Burnley	42	21	9	12	65	59	1.102	51	
3	Chelsea	42	22	5	15	56	51	1.098	49	
4	Liverpool	42	19	10	13	59	44	1.341	48	
5	Sunderland	42	22	4	16	72	59	1.220	48	
6	Bolton Wanderers	42	19	9	14	72	65	1.108	47	
7	Manchester City	42	18	9	15	71	62	1.145	45	
8	Newcastle United	42	17	9	16	44	39	1.128	43	
9	Aston Villa	42	18	6	18	75	73	1.027	42	
10	Arsenal	42	15	12	15	56	58	0.966	42	
11	Bradford (Park Avenue)	42	15	12	15	60	63	0.952	42	
12	Manchester United	42	13	14	15	54	50	1.080	40	
13	Middlesbrough	42	15	10	17	61	65	0.938	40	
14	Sheffield United	42	16	8	18	59	69	0.855	40	
15	Bradford City	42	14	11	17	54	63	0.857	39	
16	Everton	42	12	14	16	69	68	1.015	38	
17	Oldham Athletic	42	15	8	19	49	52	0.942	38	
18	Derby County	42	13	12	17	47	57	0.825	38	
19	Preston North End	42	14	10	18	57	73	0.781	38	
20	Blackburn Rovers	42	13	11	18	64	77	0.831	37	
21	Notts County (R)	42	12	12	18	56	74	0.757	36	Relegation to the Second Division
22	The Wednesday (R)	42	7	9	26	28	64	0.438	23	Relegation to the Second Division

Source: World Football
Rules for classification: 1) Points; 2) Goal average; 3) Goals scored
(C) Champions; (R) Relegated

=== Results ===
Home \ Away	ARS	AST	BLB	BOL	BRA	BPA	BUR	CHE	DER	EVE	LIV	MCI	MUN	MID	NEW	NTC	OLD	PNE	SHU	SUN	WED	WBA
Arsenal		0–1	0–1	2–2	1–2	3–0	2–0	1–1	1–0	1–1	1–0	2–2	0–3	2–1	0–1	3–1	3–2	0–0	3–0	3–2	3–1	1–0
Aston Villa	2–1		1–2	3–6	3–1	1–0	2–2	5–2	2–2	2–2	0–1	0–1	2–0	5–3	4–0	3–1	3–0	2–4	4–0	0–3	3–1	2–4
Blackburn Rovers	2–2	5–1		2–2	4–1	3–3	2–3	3–1	2–0	3–2	0–2	1–4	5–0	0–2	2–0	1–1	0–1	4–0	4–0	3–0	1–0	1–5
Bolton Wanderers	2–2	2–1	2–1		1–1	1–2	1–1	1–2	3–0	0–2	0–3	6–2	3–5	2–1	0–3	1–0	1–0	4–1	1–0	1–0	2–0	1–2
Bradford City	1–1	3–1	3–1	0–1		0–0	2–1	3–1	3–1	3–3	1–3	1–0	2–1	0–1	1–0	3–4	1–1	2–2	1–2	2–0	1–1	3–0
Bradford Park Avenue	0–0	6–1	5–2	2–0	0–0		0–1	1–0	1–1	0–2	1–2	2–1	1–4	1–1	0–1	0–1	2–0	3–3	1–0	2–2	3–0	0–4
Burnley	2–1	0–0	3–1	2–1	1–1	2–6		2–3	2–0	5–0	1–2	2–0	2–1	5–3	1–0	2–1	2–1	1–1	2–2	2–1	2–0	2–2
Chelsea	3–1	2–1	2–1	2–3	1–0	4–0	0–1		0–0	0–1	1–0	1–0	1–0	3–1	0–0	2–0	1–0	4–0	1–0	2–0	1–1	2–0
Derby County	2–1	1–0	0–0	1–2	3–0	0–0	0–2	5–0		2–1	3–0	0–0	1–1	1–2	1–0	3–1	1–1	2–0	5–1	3–1	2–1	0–4
Everton	2–3	1–1	3–0	3–3	4–1	2–0	2–2	2–3	4–0		0–0	2–0	0–0	5–2	4–0	1–2	0–2	0–1	3–0	1–3	1–1	2–5
Liverpool	2–3	2–1	3–0	2–0	2–1	3–3	0–1	0–1	3–0	3–1		1–0	0–0	1–0	1–1	3–0	2–2	1–2	2–0	3–2	1–0	0–0
Manchester City	4–1	2–2	8–2	1–4	1–0	4–1	3–1	1–0	3–1	1–1	2–1		3–3	1–0	0–0	4–1	3–1	1–0	3–3	1–0	4–2	2–3
Manchester United	0–1	1–2	1–1	1–1	0–0	0–1	0–1	0–2	0–2	1–0	0–0	1–0		1–1	2–1	0–0	1–1	5–1	3–0	2–0	0–0	1–2
Middlesbrough	1–0	1–4	2–2	1–3	4–0	1–2	4–0	0–0	2–0	1–1	3–2	0–2	1–1		0–1	5–2	1–0	4–1	1–0	0–2	3–0	0–0
Newcastle United	3–1	2–0	0–0	0–1	0–1	4–0	0–0	3–0	0–0	3–0	3–0	3–0	2–1	0–0		2–1	0–1	1–0	2–1	2–3	1–1	0–2
Notts County	2–2	2–1	5–0	2–2	5–2	0–2	2–0	0–1	2–2	1–1	1–0	4–1	0–2	1–1	0–0		2–1	1–2	2–2	2–2	3–1	2–0
Oldham Athletic	3–0	0–3	0–0	2–0	0–1	2–2	1–0	1–0	3–0	4–1	1–1	1–3	0–3	1–2	1–0	0–0		4–1	4–0	2–1	1–0	2–1
Preston North End	1–1	3–0	0–0	1–1	1–5	0–3	0–1	3–1	1–1	1–1	2–1	1–1	2–3	3–1	2–3	2–0	2–1		2–0	5–2	3–0	0–1
Sheffield United	2–0	1–2	2–0	3–2	0–0	2–2	1–3	3–1	0–0	1–1	3–2	3–1	2–2	5–1	2–1	3–0	1–0	2–1		3–1	3–0	1–0
Sunderland	1–1	2–1	2–0	2–0	2–0	2–0	3–0	3–2	2–1	2–3	0–1	2–1	3–0	1–1	2–0	3–1	3–0	1–0	3–2		2–1	4–1
The Wednesday	1–2	0–1	0–0	0–2	1–0	0–1	3–1	0–2	2–0	1–0	2–2	0–0	1–3	0–1	0–1	0–0	1–0	0–1	2–1	0–2		0–3
West Bromwich Albion	1–0	1–2	5–2	4–1	4–1	3–1	4–1	4–0	3–0	4–3	1–1	2–0	2–1	4–1	3–0	8–0	3–1	4–1	0–2	4–0	1–3	

Updated to match(es) played on unknown. Source:
Legend: Blue = home team win; Yellow = draw; Red = away team win.

=== Maps ===
Locations of the Football League First Division London teams
Locations of the Football League First Division teams

== Second Division ==
Football League Second Division
- Season: 1919–20
- Champions: Tottenham Hotspur (1st title)
- Relegated: Grimsby Town
- Failed re-election: Lincoln City
- Matches: 462
- Goals: 1,285 (2.78 per match)
- Top goalscorer: Sammy Taylor (Huddersfield Town), 35
- Biggest home win: Birmingham – Nottingham Forest 8–0 (10 Mar 1920)
- Biggest away win: Barnsley – Birmingham 0–5 (14 Feb 1920); Leicester City – Bury 0–5 (10 Apr 1920)
- Highest scoring: Hull City – Wolverhampton Wanderers 10–3 (27 Dec 1919)

Pos	Team	Pld	W	D	L	GF	GA	GAv	Pts	Promotion or relegation
1	Tottenham Hotspur (C, P)	42	32	6	4	102	32	3.188	70	Promotion to the First Division
2	Huddersfield Town (P)	42	28	8	6	97	38	2.553	64	Promotion to the First Division
3	Birmingham	42	24	8	10	85	34	2.500	56	
4	Blackpool	42	21	10	11	65	47	1.383	52	
5	Bury	42	20	8	14	60	44	1.364	48	
6	Fulham	42	19	9	14	61	50	1.220	47	
7	West Ham United	42	19	9	14	47	40	1.175	47	
8	Bristol City	42	13	17	12	46	43	1.070	43	
9	South Shields	42	15	12	15	58	48	1.208	42	
10	Stoke	42	18	6	18	60	54	1.111	42	
11	Hull City	42	18	6	18	78	72	1.083	42	
12	Barnsley	42	15	10	17	61	55	1.109	40	
13	Port Vale (Leeds City) (Note: Leeds City were expelled from the league after 8 games; Port Vale took their place and inherited their record.)	42	16	8	18	59	62	0.952	40	
14	Leicester City	42	15	10	17	41	61	0.672	40	
15	Clapton Orient	42	16	6	20	51	59	0.864	38	
16	Stockport County	42	14	9	19	52	61	0.852	37	
17	Rotherham County	42	13	8	21	51	83	0.614	34	
18	Nottingham Forest	42	11	9	22	43	73	0.589	31	
19	Wolverhampton Wanderers	42	10	10	22	55	80	0.688	30	
20	Coventry City	42	9	11	22	35	73	0.479	29	
21	Lincoln City (R)	42	9	9	24	44	101	0.436	27	Failed re-election and demoted
22	Grimsby Town (R)	42	10	5	27	34	75	0.453	25	Failed re-election and demoted to the Third Division

(C) Champions; (P) Promoted; (R) Relegated

=== Results ===
Home \ Away	BAR	BIR	BLP	BRI	BRY	CLA	COV	FUL	GRI	HUD	HUL	LEE	LEI	LIN	NOT	PTV	ROT	SSH	STP	STK	TOT	WHU	WOL
Barnsley		0–5	1–1	0–0	1–3	2–1	1–0	4–1	0–1	3–3	2–3		0–1	5–3	2–2	1–0	4–0	0–1	0–0	1–2	3–0	7–0	4–1
Birmingham	0–0		4–2	1–0	0–2	2–1	4–1	2–0	4–0	4–2	4–1		0–1	7–0	8–0	3–0	2–2	4–0	1–1	2–1	0–1	0–1	2–0
Blackpool	0–2	3–0		0–0	1–0	3–0	2–0	1–1	2–0	0–3	2–1	4–2	3–0	6–0	3–2		5–1	0–3	1–0	3–1	0–1	0–0	1–1
Bristol City	3–1	1–1	0–0		1–0	1–1	1–0	0–3	3–1	2–1	2–2		0–0	6–0	0–0	1–1	2–1	3–1	1–0	1–2	1–2	0–0	1–1
Bury	2–0	1–0	1–2	0–1		3–0	2–2	2–2	1–1	2–0	2–0		1–0	3–0	1–1	2–1	4–1	2–1	0–2	1–0	2–1	1–0	2–0
Clapton Orient	2–0	2–1	3–0	1–0	2–1		2–2	0–1	3–0	0–1	2–2		3–0	1–0	1–0	2–1	1–2	4–0	2–1	2–1	0–4	1–0	0–0
Coventry City	1–0	1–3	0–0	0–0	2–1	0–0		0–1	2–0	0–2	0–1	0–4	1–2	2–0	4–2		1–1	1–1	1–1	3–2	0–5	0–0	1–0
Fulham	1–1	1–2	1–2	1–1	1–0	2–1	0–0		2–1	2–2	1–0		5–0	3–0	1–0	4–0	3–0	1–0	4–1	0–0	1–4	1–2	1–1
Grimsby Town	1–1	0–3	1–1	2–2	1–2	2–0	0–1	0–2		1–0	2–1		1–2	2–2	1–0	2–0	0–1	3–1	0–3	2–0	2–0	0–1	0–1
Huddersfield Town	4–1	0–0	1–3	1–0	5–0	2–1	5–0	3–0	3–0		2–0		0–0	4–2	2–1	4–1	7–1	2–2	5–0	3–0	1–1	2–0	2–0
Hull City	3–1	0–0	0–1	0–0	4–2	3–1	0–1	2–0	4–1	1–4		1–1	5–1	5–2	2–0		1–0	3–0	4–1	3–0	1–3	1–1	10–3
Leeds City			1–0				3–0				1–2												1–1
Leicester City	0–0	1–0	2–3	2–1	0–5	1–1	1–0	3–2	2–0	0–4	3–2			4–0	0–0	0–1	1–1	0–0	0–2	3–1	2–4	0–0	1–2
Lincoln City	0–4	2–2	0–3	0–0	2–1	2–1	4–1	0–1	2–0	1–3	2–0		0–3		1–4	0–0	0–0	1–1	2–0	2–1	1–1	1–4	4–0
Nottingham Forest	0–1	1–2	2–0	1–2	1–0	2–1	2–1	0–3	2–0	1–2	0–2		0–0	2–1		0–1	4–1	0–0	1–1	0–2	1–1	2–1	1–0
Port Vale	0–2	1–3		3–1	2–2	4–2		3–4	2–1	0–0			1–2	1–0	4–1		4–2	1–0	2–0	0–3	0–1	1–0	
Rotherham County	1–0	0–3	1–2	2–2	1–2	3–1	4–3	1–1	3–1	1–3	1–2		1–0	3–0	2–0	2–2		1–0	1–0	1–3	1–1	0–1	2–0
South Shields	0–0	1–0	6–0	0–2	0–0	2–0	1–0	2–0	2–0	1–2	7–1		2–0	2–2	5–2	2–0	6–2		3–2	2–2	0–3	3–0	0–0
Stockport County	1–0	2–1	0–0	2–3	1–1	3–1	1–1	2–1	1–2	1–2	3–1		0–2	3–0	0–0	0–4	4–1	1–0		3–1	1–2	1–0	4–1
Stoke	2–0	0–1	2–0	2–0	1–1	2–0	6–1	1–0	3–0	0–1	3–1		3–0	1–3	0–2	0–0	3–0	0–0	2–1		1–3	2–1	3–0
Tottenham Hotspur	4–0	0–0	2–2	2–0	2–1	2–1	4–1	4–0	3–1	2–0	4–0		4–0	6–1	5–2	2–0	2–0	2–0	2–0	2–0		2–0	4–2
West Ham United	0–2	1–2	1–0	2–0	1–0	0–1	2–0	0–1	1–0	1–1	2–1		1–0	1–1	5–1	3–1	2–1	1–0	3–0	1–1	2–1		4–0
Wolverhampton Wanderers	2–4	0–2	0–3	3–1	0–1	1–2	2–0	2–1	6–1	2–3	4–2	2–4	1–1	4–0	4–0		0–1	0–0	2–2	4–0	1–3	1–1	

Updated to match(es) played on unknown. Source: Ian Laschke: Rothmans Book of Football League Records 1888–89 to 1978–79. Macdonald and Jane's, London & Sydney, 1980.
Note: Port Vale takes over from Leeds City and then inherits the latter's record up to that date.
Legend: Blue = home team win; Yellow = draw; Red = away team win.

=== Maps ===
Locations of the Football League Second Division London teams
Locations of the Football League Second Division teams

== Attendances ==
=== Division One ===
No.	Club	Average
1	Chelsea FC	42,615
2	Newcastle United FC	38,390
3	Arsenal FC	34,485
4	Aston Villa FC	33,500
5	Liverpool FC	29,730
6	Everton FC	29,050
7	West Bromwich Albion FC	29,025
8	Manchester United	26,540
9	Sunderland AFC	25,580
10	Manchester City FC	25,160
11	Sheffield United FC	24,205
12	Bolton Wanderers FC	23,300
13	Middlesbrough FC	20,930
14	Burnley FC	19,530
15	The Wednesday	18,430
16	Blackburn Rovers FC	18,110
17	Bradford City AFC	17,200
18	Notts County FC	16,215
19	Preston North End FC	15,950
20	Bradford Park Avenue AFC	14,340
21	Derby County FC	13,725
22	Oldham Athletic FC	12,785

=== Division Two ===
No.	Club	Average
1	Tottenham Hotspur FC	34,185
2	Birmingham City FC	23,715
3	West Ham United FC	19,415
4	Coventry City FC	16,875
5	Gateshead AFC	14,975
6	Fulham FC	14,530
7	Bristol City FC	13,940
8	Leicester City FC	13,355
9	Leyton Orient FC	13,085
10	Wolverhampton Wanderers FC	12,780
11	Stoke City FC	12,145
12	Port Vale FC	10,880
13	Nottingham Forest FC	9,735
14	Hull City AFC	9,520
15	Rotherham County FC	9,310
16	Bury FC	9,225
17	Huddersfield Town AFC	9,185
18	Barnsley FC	8,790
19	Blackpool FC	7,475
20	Stockport County FC	7,420
21	Lincoln City FC	6,675
22	Grimsby Town FC	6,200

== See also ==
- 1919–20 in English football
- 1919 in association football
- 1920 in association football

== Sources ==
- Ian Laschke: Rothmans Book of Football League Records 1888–89 to 1978–79. Macdonald and Jane's, London & Sydney, 1980.
