= Harry Lowe (footballer, born March 1886) =

English footballer and manager (1886–1958)

Henry Charles Lowe (20 March 1886 – 1958) was a footballer who played for Liverpool in the early 20th century.
