= 1913–14 FA Cup =

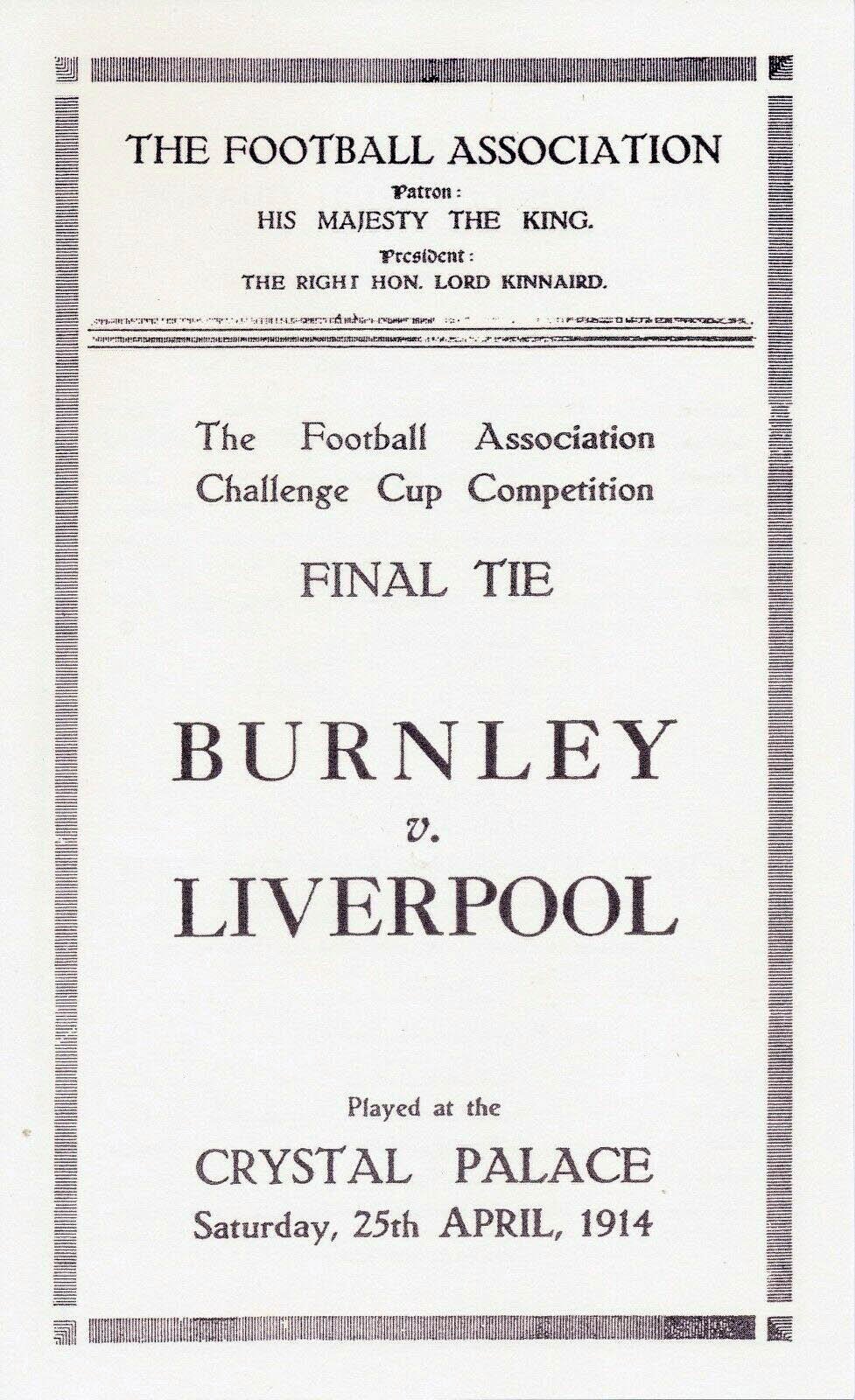
- Program for final match

Tournament details
- Country: England; Wales

Final positions
- Champions: Burnley (1st title)
- Runners-up: Liverpool

The 1913–14 FA Cup was the 43rd season of the world's oldest association football competition, the Football Association Challenge Cup (more usually known as the FA Cup). Burnley won the competition for the first and (as of 2026) only time, beating Liverpool 1–0 in the final at Crystal Palace, London.

Queens Park Rangers, then of the Southern League, reached the last eight. They were the last non-league team to reach the quarter-finals until Lincoln City in 2017.

Matches were scheduled to be played at the stadium of the team named first on the date specified for each round, which was always a Saturday. If scores were level after 90 minutes had been played, a replay would take place at the stadium of the second-named team later the same week. If the replayed match was drawn further replays would be held at neutral venues until a winner was determined. If scores were level after 90 minutes had been played in a replay, a 30-minute period of extra time would be played.

== Calendar ==
The format of the FA Cup for the season had two preliminary rounds, five qualifying rounds, four proper rounds, and the semi-finals and final.

Round	Date
Extra preliminary round	13 September 1913
Preliminary round	27 September 1913
First round qualifying	11 October 1913
Second round qualifying	1 November 1913
Third round qualifying	15 November 1913
Fourth round qualifying	29 November 1913
Fifth round qualifying	13 December 1913
First round proper	10 January 1914
Second round proper	31 January 1914
Third round proper	21 February 1914
Fourth round proper	7 March 1914
Semi-finals	28 March 1914
Final	25 April 1914

== Qualifying rounds ==
The 12 teams that won through to the main competition from the fifth qualifying round were Football League Second Division club Glossop along with non-league sides Port Vale, South Shields, Southend United, Merthyr Town, Chesterfield, Swansea Town, Chatham, Stoke, Gainsborough Trinity, Norwich City and Gillingham. Although only Merthyr Town and Swansea Town were featuring in the competition proper for the first time, the reconstituted Port Vale was appearing at this stage only seven seasons after the original Burslem Port Vale had resigned from the Football League and folded. Additionally, Chatham was progressing past the qualifying stages for the first time since 1888-89.

Back at the extra preliminary round stage, 92 teams had kicked off the competition in September 1913. The most successful of these were future Football League members Ashington and West Midlands heavyweights Dudley Town, who both reached the fourth qualifying round before going out to Willington and Crewe Alexandra, respectively.

== First round proper ==
38 of the 40 clubs from the First and Second divisions joined the 12 clubs who came through the qualifying rounds. The other two sides, Stockport County and Glossop were entered in the fourth qualifying round, with Stockport going out at that stage to Gainsborough Trinity.

The progression of Merthyr Town and Swansea Town meant that this was the first season since the introduction of FA Cup qualifying rounds that two teams from Wales featured in the first round proper. Their meeting at Vetch Field was the first all-Welsh tie in the main draw of the English FA Cup since Druids and Chirk faced off in the third round of the 1884–85 tournament.

Fourteen Southern League sides were given byes to the first round to bring the total number of teams up to 64. These were:

Southampton Millwall Athletic Queens Park Rangers Crystal Palace Swindon Town Plymouth Argyle Reading	Portsmouth Northampton Town Bristol Rovers Exeter City London Caledonians West Ham United Brighton & Hove Albion

32 matches were scheduled to be played on 10 January 1914. Seven matches were drawn and went to replays in the following midweek fixture.

Tie no	Home team	Score	Away team	Date
1	Birmingham	2–1	Southend United	10 January 1914
2	Burnley	3–1	South Shields	10 January 1914
3	Liverpool	1–1	Barnsley	10 January 1914
Replay	Barnsley	0–1	Liverpool	14 January 1914
4	Preston North End	5–2	Bristol Rovers	10 January 1914
5	Gillingham	1–0	Blackpool	10 January 1914
6	Blackburn Rovers	3–0	Middlesbrough	10 January 1914
7	Aston Villa	4–0	Stoke	10 January 1914
8	The Wednesday	3–2	Notts County	10 January 1914
9	Bolton Wanderers	3–0	Port Vale	10 January 1914
10	Wolverhampton Wanderers	3–0	Southampton	10 January 1914
11	West Bromwich Albion	2–0	Grimsby Town	10 January 1914
12	Sunderland	9–0	Chatham	10 January 1914
13	Derby County	1–0	Northampton Town	10 January 1914
14	Swindon Town	1–0	Manchester United	10 January 1914
15	Leicester Fosse	5–5	Tottenham Hotspur	10 January 1914
Replay	Tottenham Hotspur	2–0	Leicester Fosse	15 January 1914
16	Newcastle United	0–5	Sheffield United	10 January 1914
17	Manchester City	2–0	Fulham	10 January 1914
18	Queens Park Rangers	2–2	Bristol City	10 January 1914
Replay	Bristol City	0–2	Queens Park Rangers	14 January 1914
19	Glossop	2–1	Everton	10 January 1914
20	Portsmouth	0–4	Exeter City	10 January 1914
21	West Ham United	8–1	Chesterfield	10 January 1914
22	Plymouth Argyle	4–1	Lincoln City	10 January 1914
23	Bradford City	2–0	Woolwich Arsenal	10 January 1914
24	Millwall Athletic	0–0	Chelsea	10 January 1914
Replay	Chelsea	0–1	Millwall Athletic	14 January 1914
25	Hull City	0–0	Bury	10 January 1914
Replay	Bury	2–1	Hull City	14 January 1914
26	Leeds City	4–2	Gainsborough Trinity	10 January 1914
27	Clapton Orient	2–2	Nottingham Forest	10 January 1914
Replay	Nottingham Forest	0–1	Clapton Orient	14 January 1914
28	Oldham Athletic	1–1	Brighton & Hove Albion	10 January 1914
Replay	Brighton & Hove Albion	1–0	Oldham Athletic	14 January 1914
29	Crystal Palace	2–1	Norwich City	10 January 1914
30	Bradford Park Avenue	5–1	Reading	10 January 1914
31	Huddersfield Town	3–0	London Caledonians	10 January 1914
32	Swansea Town	2–0	Merthyr Town	10 January 1914

== Second round proper ==
The 16 second-round matches were played on 31 January 1914. One match was drawn, with the replay taking place the following weekend.

Tie no	Home team	Score	Away team	Date
1	Birmingham	1–0	Huddersfield Town	31 January 1914
2	Burnley	3–2	Derby County	31 January 1914
3	Liverpool	2–0	Gillingham	31 January 1914
4	Blackburn Rovers	2–0	Bury	31 January 1914
5	Bolton Wanderers	4–2	Swindon Town	31 January 1914
6	Wolverhampton Wanderers	1–1	The Wednesday	31 January 1914
Replay	The Wednesday	1–0	Wolverhampton Wanderers	4 February 1914
7	Sunderland	2–1	Plymouth Argyle	31 January 1914
8	Sheffield United	3–1	Bradford Park Avenue	31 January 1914
9	Manchester City	2–1	Tottenham Hotspur	31 January 1914
10	Glossop	0–1	Preston North End	31 January 1914
11	West Ham United	2–0	Crystal Palace	31 January 1914
12	Brighton & Hove Albion	3–1	Clapton Orient	31 January 1914
13	Millwall Athletic	1–0	Bradford City	31 January 1914
14	Leeds City	0–2	West Bromwich Albion	31 January 1914
15	Exeter City	1–2	Aston Villa	31 January 1914
16	Swansea Town	1–2	Queens Park Rangers	31 January 1914

== Third round proper ==
The eight third-round matches were scheduled for 21 February 1914. There was one replay, played in the following midweek fixture. Queens Park Rangers beat Birmingham City to qualify for the quarter-finals: the last non-league team to achieve such a feat until Lincoln City in the 2016–17 FA Cup.

Tie no	Home team	Score	Away team	Date
1	Birmingham	1–2	Queens Park Rangers	21 February 1914
2	Burnley	3–0	Bolton Wanderers	21 February 1914
3	Blackburn Rovers	1–2	Manchester City	21 February 1914
4	Aston Villa	2–1	West Bromwich Albion	21 February 1914
5	The Wednesday	3–0	Brighton & Hove Albion	21 February 1914
6	Sunderland	2–0	Preston North End	21 February 1914
7	West Ham United	1–1	Liverpool	21 February 1914
Replay	Liverpool	5–1	West Ham United	25 February 1914
8	Millwall Athletic	0–4	Sheffield United	21 February 1914

== Fourth round proper ==
The four fourth-round matches were scheduled for 7 March 1914. There were two replays, played in the following midweek. One of these, between Manchester City and Sheffield United, went to a second replay, which Sheffield United won.

Tie no	Home team	Score	Away team	Date
1	Liverpool	2–1	Queens Park Rangers	7 March 1914
2	The Wednesday	0–1	Aston Villa	7 March 1914
3	Sunderland	0–0	Burnley	7 March 1914
Replay	Burnley	2–1	Sunderland	11 March 1914
4	Manchester City	0–0	Sheffield United	7 March 1914
Replay	Sheffield United	0–0	Manchester City	12 March 1914
Replay	Sheffield United	1–0	Manchester City	16 March 1914

== Semi finals ==
The semi-final matches were played on 28 March 1914. The Burnley–Sheffield United match went to a replay, which Burnley won, going on to meet Liverpool in the final.

28 March 1914
15:00

Burnley	0–0	Sheffield United

Old Trafford, Manchester

Replay

1 April 1914
15:00

Burnley	1–0	Sheffield United

Goodison Park, Liverpool

28 March 1914
15:00

Liverpool	2–0	Aston Villa

White Hart Lane, London

== Final ==
The final was contested by Burnley and Liverpool at Crystal Palace. Burnley won by a single goal, scored by ex-Everton forward Bert Freeman. The game was the last final at Crystal Palace and was played in front of a reigning monarch, George V, for the first time. Neither club had reached the FA Cup Final before.

25 April 1914
15:30 BST

Burnley	1–0	Liverpool
Freeman 58'

Crystal Palace, London
Attendance: 72,778
Referee: Herbert Bamlett (Gateshead)

== See also ==
- List of FA Cup finals
