= Jackie Sheldon =

English footballer

John Sheldon (born January 1887) was an English footballer who played for Liverpool during the early part of the 20th century.

== Life and playing career ==
Sheldon was born in Clay Cross, Derbyshire, England, and played for Nuneaton and Manchester United before being signed by the Liverpool manager Tom Watson in November 1913. Sheldon made his Liverpool debut on 29 November 1913 in the 2–1 First Division win over Tottenham Hotspur at Anfield. He scored his first goal the following month on 6 December at Villa Park in a 2–1 defeat to Aston Villa. The winger went on to miss only three games for the remainder of the 1913/14 season which included the whole of the FA Cup run when Liverpool reached their first final on 25 April 1914. The game was the last final held at the Crystal Palace ground and the first time to be played in front of a reigning monarch, George V. Burnley won 1–0 and it was another 51 years before Liverpool won the FA Cup.

Sheldon had a decent 1914/15 season finishing second on Liverpool's appearance list and third on the goalscoring list. That season however, he became notorious for his part in the 1915 British football betting scandal, of which he was found to be the talisman for. He was banned – initially for life – along with the other players involved in the match fixing plot, but shortly afterward the start of the First World War saw the suspension of league football anyway. At the end of the war his ban was lifted, and he returned to Liverpool where the following two years were much like those before the war, with Sheldon only missing 12 games during this period.

Sheldon was forced into early retirement due to injury. His final game for Liverpool was on 16 April 1921 in a league match against Derby County, the game finishing 1–1.

== Career details ==
- Manchester United F.C. (1910–1913) 26 appearances, 1 goal – Division 1 winner (1910/11)
- Liverpool F.C. (1913–1921) 147 appearances, 20 goals – FA Cup runners-up medal (1914)

== See also ==
- 1915 British football betting scandal
