= Tom Miller (footballer, born 1890) =

Scottish footballer (1890–1958)

Personal information
- Full name: Thomas Miller
- Date of birth: 30 June 1890
- Place of birth: Motherwell, Scotland
- Date of death: 3 September 1958 (aged 68)
- Height: 5 ft 9 in (1.75 m)
- Positions: Inside right; centre forward

Youth career
- Larkhall Hearts
- Glenview

Senior career*
| Years | Team | Apps | (Gls) |
| – | Larkhall United | | |
| 1911–1912 | Hamilton Academical | 27 | (8) |
| 1912–1920 | Liverpool | 127 | (50) |
| 1915 | → Wishaw Thistle (loan) | | |
| 1915 | → Royal Albert (loan) | | |
| 1920–1921 | Manchester United | 25 | (7) |
| 1921–1923 | Heart of Midlothian | 26 | (7) |
| 1922–1923 | → Torquay United (loan) | | |
| 1923–1926 | Hamilton Academical | 100 | (16) |
| 1924 | → Royal Albert (loan) | 1 | (0) |
| 1926–1927 | Raith Rovers | 0 | (0) |
| Total | | 316 | (88) |

International career
| 1920–1921 | Scotland | 3 | (2) |

Managerial career
- 1930: Barrow
- * Club domestic league appearances and goals

Thomas Miller (30 June 1890 – 3 September 1958) was a Scottish footballer who played for Liverpool and the Scotland national team during the early part of the 20th century.

== Career ==
=== Club ===
Born in Motherwell, Miller played for Larkhall United and Hamilton Academical before manager Tom Watson brought him to Anfield in February 1912 for £400. Miller made his debut in a home Football League First Division match against The Wednesday on 17 February 1912, a game that finished 1–1, his first goal came a fortnight later on 2 March, a division 1 match, again, at home, and again, in a 1–1 draw, this time with Middlesbrough, a game that saw the debut of a Liverpool great, winger Bill Lacey.

The inside forward was a main stay of the Reds line-up and helped the club reach their first FA Cup Final in 1914, which ended in a 1–0 defeat to Burnley. This the last time the showpiece final was to be played at the Crystal Palace ground and it was also the first time the final was played in front of a reigning monarch, George V.

Miller's career was interrupted by the 1915 British football match-fixing scandal and World War I, but he did return to the Merseyside club in 1919 after its conclusion. He found success, scoring 13 goals in 25 matches, better than a goal every other game. His younger brother John was also at the club by this time but they only appeared in three games together, and John only made the first team eight times in all; the first time the siblings appeared together was in a league game at Boundary Park against Oldham on 2 April 1920, a game that finished 1–1. Two other Miller brothers, William and Adam were also footballers with Hamilton Accies, the latter playing over 250 times for the club.

This 1919–20 season was to be Miller's last for the Reds as he was transferred to Manchester United on 23 September 1920, although not before he managed to earn himself a descent goals-per-game ratio at Anfield scoring 56 times in 146 appearances (averaging a goal every 2.6 games). After a season at Old Trafford, Miller later played for Heart of Midlothian, Torquay, Hamilton for a second spell and Raith Rovers before he drew a curtain on his playing career. He had a short spell as manager of Barrow, during which he recruited his brother John.

=== International ===
Miller played for Scotland at international level and played three times, making his debut while he was at Liverpool in a British Championship fixture at Hillsborough on 10 April 1920; Miller scored twice in the first half, but still finished on the losing side as England won 5–4 after being 4–2 down at half-time. He won two further caps in 1921 while at Manchester United (including the coveted England fixture) despite enduring a poor spell at club level, his cause helped by a strong performance and goal in the 'Home Scots v Anglo-Scots' trial match of that year.
