= Tom Fairfoul =

Scottish footballer

Personal information
- Full name: Thomas Fairfoul
- Date of birth: 16 January 1881
- Place of birth: West Calder, Scotland
- Date of death: 2 December 1952 (aged 71)
- Place of death: Scotland
- Position: Half-back

Youth career
- Lanark Athletic
- Patna Doon Athletic

Senior career*
Years	Team	Apps	(Gls)
1904–1906	Kilmarnock	42	(7)
1906–1913	Third Lanark	206	(27)
1913–1915	Liverpool	62	(0)
Total		248	(34)

International career
1909	Scottish Football League XI	1	(0)
- * Club domestic league appearances and goals

Thomas Fairfoul (16 January 1881 – 2 December 1952) was a Scottish footballer who played as a right-half.

Born in West Calder, West Lothian, Fairfoul made over 200 senior appearances in Scottish football, playing for Kilmarnock and Third Lanark, before moving south of the border to join Liverpool in 1913. He spent two years with the club, where his fortunes were mixed. He played in the 1914 FA Cup Final, ending on the losing side, but was later suspended by the FA for his involvement in the betting scandal of 1915. Fairfoul was re-instated after the break for World War I but did not return to football.
