= Donald McKinlay =

Scottish footballer

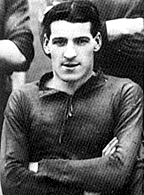
- McKinlay in 1910

Personal information
- Date of birth: 25 July 1891
- Place of birth: Boghall, Scotland
- Date of death: 16 September 1959 (aged 68)
- Height: 5 ft 9 in (1.75 m)
- Position: Left back

Youth career
- 1905–1908: Newton Swifts
- 1908–1909: Rutherglen Woodburn

Senior career*
Years	Team	Apps	(Gls)
1909–1910	Newton Villa		
1910–1929	Liverpool	393	(34)
1929–1931	Prescot Cables		

International career
1922	Scotland	2	(0)
- * Club domestic league appearances and goals

Donald McKinlay (25 July 1891 – 16 September 1959) was a Scottish footballer who played as a left back. He spent most of his career with Liverpool, winning the Football League title twice in the early 1920s.

== Early career ==
Born in the hamlet of Boghall and raised in the mining village of Newton in Lanarkshire, McKinlay played local football with Newton Swifts, Rutherglen Woodburn and Newton Villa.

== Liverpool ==
He joined Liverpool in January 1910. The goalkeeper Kenny Campbell (a childhood acquaintance) credited McKinlay's assistance during his early days at Anfield. He captained the club from January 1922 to 1928, and made 434 appearances for the club, including 393 in the league. Liverpool were league champions two years in succession in 1921–22 and 1922–23 in the first two seasons of his captaincy.

He made two appearances in the Scotland national team in 1922.

== Later years ==
He finished his career with nearby Prescot Cables, and later became a publican in Liverpool.
