= Great Harwood Town Hall =

Municipal building in Great Harwood, Lancashire, England

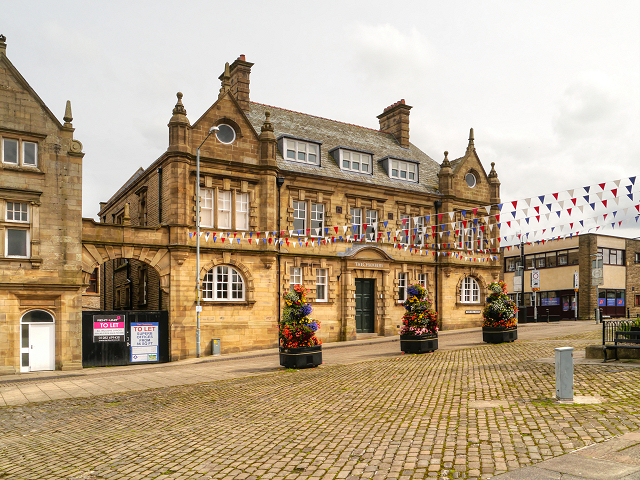
- Great Harwood Town Hall

- Shown in Lancashire Location in Borough of Hyndburn
- 53.7857°N 2.4077°W
- Location: Town Hall Square, Great Harwood

History
- Built: 1900

Site notes
- Architect(s): Briggs and Wolstenholme
- Architectural style: Baroque style

Listed Building – Grade II
- Official name: Town Hall
- Designated: 9 March 1984
- Reference no.: 1206022

Great Harwood Town Hall is a municipal building in Town Hall Square, Great Harwood, Lancashire, England. The town hall, which was the headquarters of Great Harwood Urban District Council Council, is a grade II listed building.

== History ==
After significant population growth in the town associated with the local specialism known as mercerisation, i.e. strengthening of cotton for the textile industry, Great Harwood became an urban district in 1894. In this context, civic leaders decided to procure a town hall: the site they selected had been occupied by a row of old cottages.

The new building, which was designed by Briggs and Wolstenholme in the Baroque style was completed in 1900. The design involved a symmetrical main frontage with five bays facing onto the new square with the end bays, which slightly projected forward, displaying Diocletian windows on the ground floor, three-light sash windows on the first floor flanked by corbelled corners with turrets above and oculi in the gables. The central section of three bays featured a doorway with a Gibbs surround and a segmental pediment on the ground floor, two-light sash windows in each of the bays on the first floor and dormer windows at attic level.

The building was part of a greater development to create a new Town Hall Square, which also involved the building of the Manchester and County Bank (now the NatWest Bank) on a corner site to the north of the town hall, also completed in 1900, and the Mercer Memorial Tower commemorating the life of the scientist, John Mercer, completed in 1903.

The building was used by the War Office as a recruiting station for the Accrington Pals Battalion of the East Lancashire Regiment, a part of Kitchener's Army which was raised in September 1914 at the outbreak of the First World war. A roll of honour designed by R. Dugdale & Sons commemorating local service personnel who had died in the First World War was established in the town hall after the war.

The building continued to serve as the headquarters of the local urban district council for much of the 20th century but ceased to be the local seat of government when the enlarged Hyndburn Borough Council was formed in 1974. It subsequently remained vacant in a semi-derelict state until it was acquired by a developer, Globe Enterprises, and, after a programme of works costing £500,000, it re-opened as an office complex known as "The Chambers" in May 2011. Globe Enterprises had been established as a joint venture between Hyndburn Council, Barnfield Construction and local businessman, Stuart Nevison of AMS Neve, although the council subsequently sold its stake to the local entrepreneurs, the Hussain family. A landscaping scheme, involving a series of stone tree planters, was introduced in Town Hall Square in 2013.

== See also ==
- Listed buildings in Great Harwood
