= St Bartholomew's Church, Great Harwood =

Coordinates: 53.7901°N 2.4054°W

St Bartholomew's, Great Harwood
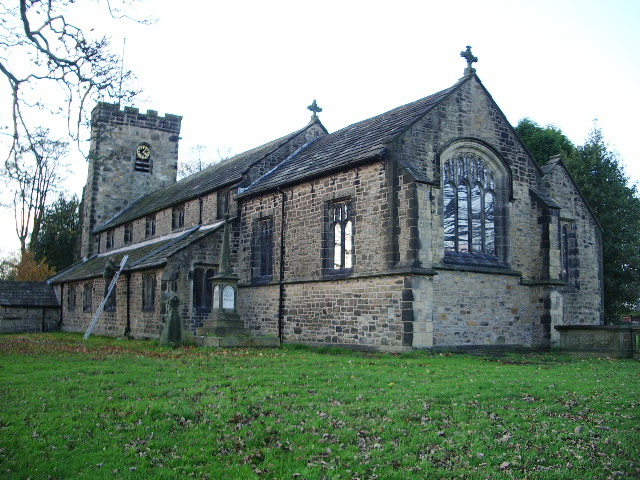
- St Bartholomew's Church, Great Harwood, from the southeast

- Location in Hyndburn
- OS grid reference: SD 73387 32716
- Location: Great Harwood, Lancashire
- Country: England
- Denomination: Anglican

History
- Status: Parish church

Architecture
- Functional status: Active
- Heritage designation: Grade II*
- Designated: 11 July 1966
- Architect: Paley and Austin (alterations)
- Architectural type: Church
- Style: Perpendicular

Administration
- Province: York
- Diocese: Blackburn
- Archdeaconry: Blackburn
- Deanery: Whalley

St Bartholomew's Church is in the town of Great Harwood in Lancashire, England. It is an active Anglican parish church in the Diocese of Blackburn. The church is recorded in the National Heritage List for England as a designated Grade II* listed building.

== History ==
Historically, the township of Great Harwood was part of the ecclesiastical parish of Blackburn. There is mention of a parochial chapel of ease dedicated to St Lawrence at Great Harwood in sources from 1389. A chantry to St Lawrence's was later formed by Thomas Hesketh of Martholme, and dedicated to St Bartholomew. The dedication of the chapel was subsequently changed to St Bartholomew.

The tower of the present building probably dates from the 15th century. Most of the rest of the church appears to date from the 16th century and may have been rebuilt by Thomas Hesketh of Martholme, who made additions to his home at that time. In 1880–81 the Lancaster architects Paley and Austin added a bay to the nave, a new chancel, a vestry, an organ chamber and a pulpit. The seating was increased from 377 to 470. These alterations cost £2,000 (equivalent to £210,000 in 2025).

== Architecture ==
=== Exterior ===
St Bartholomew's is built in the Perpendicular style in coursed rubble, with roofs of stone slate. Its plan consists of a nave with a west tower, aisles and a chancel to the east. There is a porch to the south and a vestry to the north. The tower has four stages and diagonal buttresses. There is a stair turret at the south east corner, and a crenellated parapet. There is a three-light west window under a pointed arch head, with a moulding. There are two-light belfry louvres with moulding.

The nave and aisles have three-light windows with stone mullions In the south wall of the chancel there are two two-light windows. The east window has four lights and Perpendicular-style tracery.

=== Interior and fittings ===
Internally, the tower measures 9 feet (2.7 m) by 10 feet (3.0 m). The nave measures 66 feet 9 inches (20.3 m) by 15 feet 6 inches (4.7 m) and is accessed from the tower through a high arch with chamfered orders.

There is a 19th-century reredos, now in the tower, that depicts the Annunciation. There is 17th-century octagonal baptismal font. Stained glass in the church includes work by Henry Holiday, Ballantine & Gardner and A. Seward & Co.

The Lanterns in the main church were recently updated to LED by Electrical & Building Solutions with the assistance of Saturn Lighting Bolton, which has enabled a great energy saving and increase in the quality of artificial light in the space without changing the look or feel of the main hall.

== Churchyard ==
The political activist and cotton weaver Mortimer Grimshaw (died 1869) is buried in the old churchyard. St Bartholomew's churchyard extension contains the war graves of two soldiers and an airman of World War I.

== Assessment and administration ==
St Bartholomew's was designated a Grade II* listed building on 11 July 1966. The Grade II* designation is the second highest of the three grades of listed buildings.

An active parish church in the Church of England, St Batholomew's is part of the diocese of Blackburn, which is in the Province of York. It is in the archdeaconry of Blackburn and the Deanery of Whalley.

== See also ==
- Listed buildings in Great Harwood
- Grade II* listed buildings in Lancashire
- List of ecclesiastical works by Paley and Austin
