= The Victoria, Great Harwood =

Listed pub in Lancashire, England

The Victoria
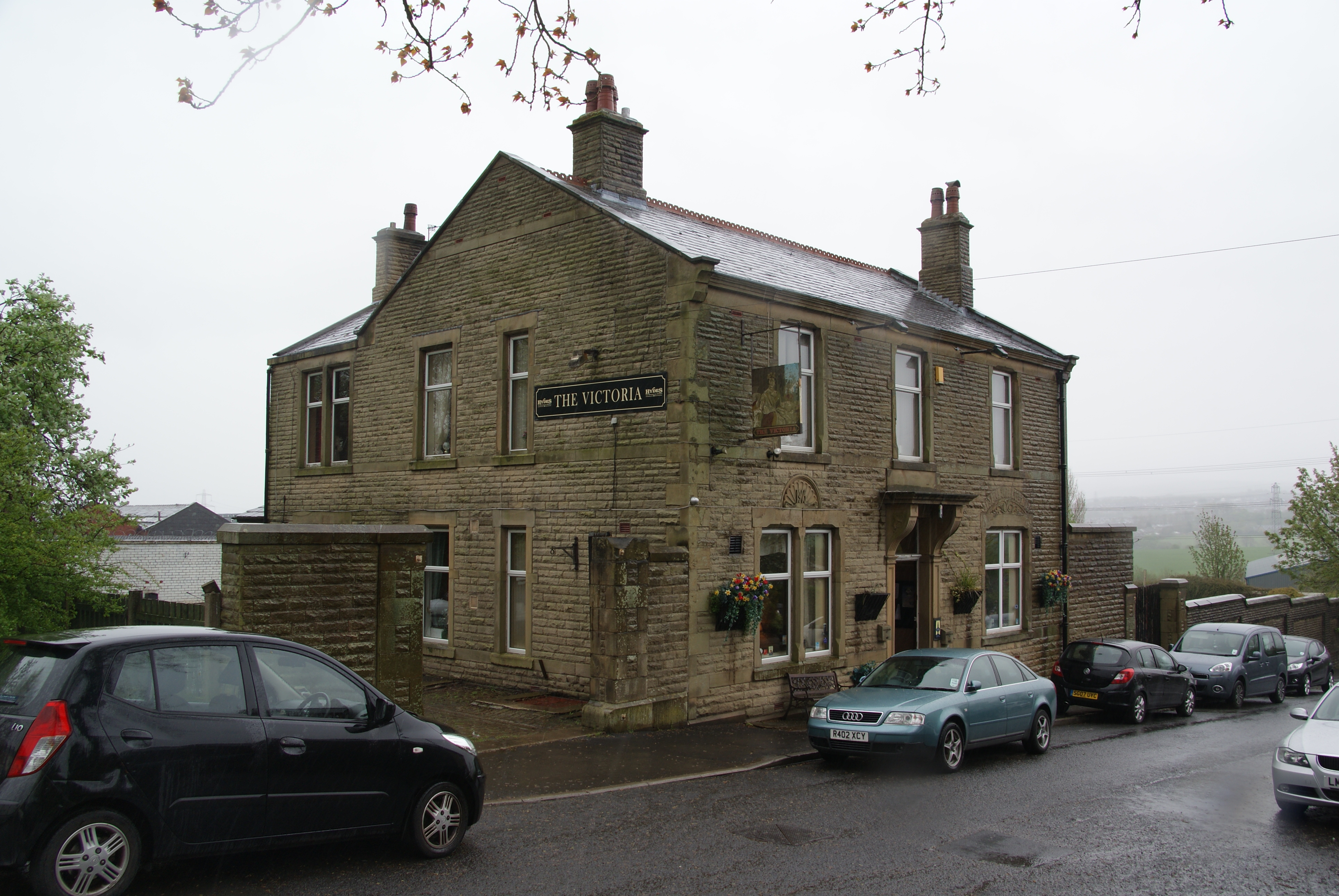
- The pub in 2013
- Alternative names: Butcher Brig

General information
- Type: Public house
- Location: St John's Street, Great Harwood, Lancashire, England
- Coordinates: 53.781347°N 2.404960°W
- Year built: 1905; 121 years ago
- Renovated: Late 20th century (altered)

Design and construction
- Architect: Alfred Nuttall
- Designations

Listed Building – Grade II
- Official name: The Victoria public house including attached walls, gate piers, setted yards and outbuilding
- Designated: 31 October 1997
- Reference no.: 1244858

The Victoria is a Grade II listed public house on St John's Street in Great Harwood, a town in the Hyndburn district of Lancashire, England. Built in 1905 to the designs of Alfred Nuttall, it is noted for its exceptionally intact Edwardian interior, which retains much of its original layout, fittings and Art Nouveau decoration. The pub is included on the Campaign for Real Ale (CAMRA)'s National Inventory of Historic Pub Interiors, where its interior is rated three stars and regarded as being of "outstanding national historic importance".

== History ==
The building was constructed as a public house in 1905 to the designs of Alfred Nuttall, on a site beside the former Great Harwood loop of the Lancashire and Yorkshire Railway. The pub was constructed during a period of rapid expansion in the town, which saw the development of textile mills and terraced housing south of the railway line in the late 19th and early 20th centuries. Situated immediately west of the recently completed Palatine Mill, the Victoria may have been intended to serve the growing industrial workforce in the area. Minor alterations to the building were carried out in the late 20th century. The pub is locally known as the "Butcher Brig", a nickname derived from a former slaughterhouse nearby and an adjacent railway bridge.

On 31 October 1997, The Victoria was designated a Grade II listed building. In 2022 it was among eleven English pubs whose listings were revised, upgraded or newly created by Historic England to recognise their historic and unusual interiors. The pub was included on the Campaign for Real Ale (CAMRA)'s National Inventory of Historic Pub Interiors before the inventory's grading system was revised. Under the revised scheme, it is rated three stars and its interior is regarded as being "of outstanding national historic importance".

== Architecture ==
=== Exterior ===
The building is constructed of buff sandstone with ashlar detailing and a Welsh slate roof. Built to a symmetrical three-bay design, it has two storeys above a cellar. The principal elevation has a central entrance with its original oak door beneath a decorative canopy, flanked by windows with dressed-stone surrounds. A dated plaque inscribed "1905" survives above one of the ground-floor windows. Other features include moulded stonework, prominent chimney stacks and decorative ridge tiles.

The side elevations continue the use of dressed-stone surrounds and regularly spaced windows, while the rear incorporates later service ranges and single-storey additions. Despite the installation of replacement uPVC windows, the building remains a well-preserved example of an early 20th-century pub.

=== Interior ===
The interior is organised around a central drinking lobby. Decorative wall tiling, etched glass, timber panelling and plasterwork are used extensively throughout. The servery occupies a central position and retains its original mirrored bar backs, tiled fittings and serving hatches, while the arrangement of corridors and separate rooms demonstrates the traditional division of customers into distinct drinking areas.

The principal ground-floor rooms include the Commercial Room, Parlour, Public Kitchen, Bar Parlour and Smoke Room, each retaining varying degrees of original joinery, fixed seating, fireplaces and decorative glass. Art Nouveau influences are particularly evident in the etched glazing and tiled decoration, while features such as terrazzo, wood-block and quarry-tiled floors survive in different parts of the interior.

A timber staircase leads to the former private accommodation above. The staircase itself retains coloured leaded glass and decorative detailing that continues the character of the ground floor.

== See also ==
- Listed buildings in Great Harwood
