= Thomas Dunham Whitaker =

English priest and topographer (1759–1821)

The Reverend Dr Thomas Dunham Whitaker FRS
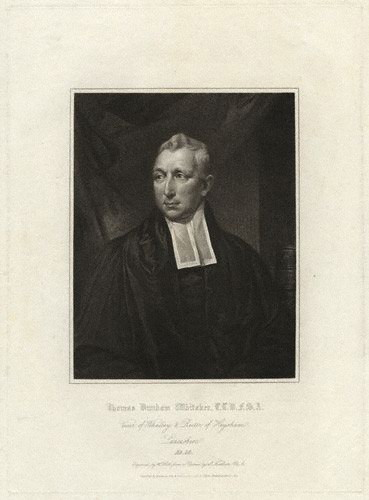
- Thomas Dunham Whitaker, 1816 engraving by William Holl the elder after a portrait by James Northcote
- Born: June 8, 1759; Raynham, Norfolk
- Died: December 18, 1821; Blackburn, Lancashire
- Education: St John's College, Cambridge: (LLB; LLD)
- Occupations: Lawyer; Clergyman
- Spouse: Lucy Thoresby (m. 1783)
- Children: Robert Nowell Whitaker
- Parents: William Whitaker; Lucy Dunham
- Relatives: William Whitaker

Ecclesiastical career
- Religion: Christianity (Anglican)
- Church: Church of England
- Ordained: 1785 (priest)
- Offices held: Curate of Holme Chapel (1797); Vicar of Whalley (1809); Rector of Heysham (181); Vicar of Blackburn (1818)

Thomas Dunham Whitaker (8 June 1759 – 18 December 1821) was an English clergyman and topographer who was Vicar of Whalley, from 1809 and Blackburn, from 1818. He undertook landscape improvements in the Cliviger area, and oversaw the planting of approximately half a million trees between 1785 and 1815, winning the gold medal of the Society of Arts for planting 64,000 larches in one year.

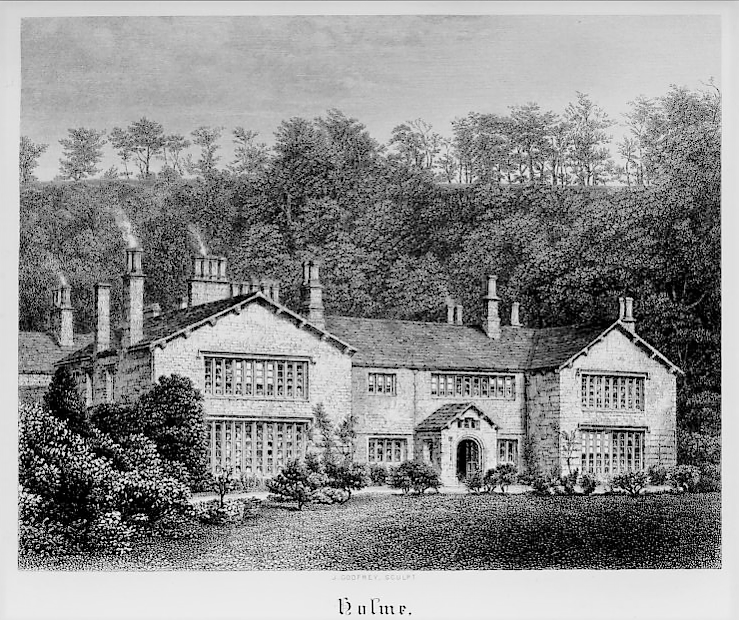
Holme Hall (also known as The Holme) in Cliviger in 1874, engraving from An history of the original Parish of Whalley, and honor of Clitheroe, Thomas Dunham Whitaker, 4th ed.

== Early life ==
Born at Raynham, Norfolk, on 8 June 1759, he was the son of William Whitaker (1730–1782), curate of Raynham, Norfolk, and his wife Lucy, daughter of Robert Dunham, and widow of Ambrose Allen. In 1760, his father moved to his ancestral house at Holme, in the township of Cliviger, Lancashire, and the boy was, in November 1766, placed under the care of the Rev. John Shaw of Rochdale. In November 1774, after spending a short time with the Rev. William Sheepshanks of Grassington in Craven, he was admitted to St John's College, Cambridge, and went into residence in October 1775. He took the degree of LL.B. in November 1781. His intention to enter the legal profession changed on the death of his father in the following year, when he settled at Holme.

== Career ==
Whitaker was ordained in 1785, but remained without pastoral charge until 1797, when he was licensed to the perpetual curacy of Holme Chapel, where he had rebuilt the chapel at his own cost in 1788. He completed his degree of LL.D. in 1801. In 1809 he became vicar of the extensive parish of Whalley, Lancashire. The rectory of Heysham, near Lancaster, was presented to him in January 1813. He resigned it in 1819. On 7 November 1818 he became vicar of Blackburn, a benefice he retained, together with Whalley, until his death.

When settled at Holme he instituted a local literary club. He had influence with the people of his parishes, and on several occasions exerted it to quell disturbances, particularly at Blackburn in 1817. For his 'patriotic services' he was presented with a public testimonial in April 1821. He was also very interested in topography and forestry, writing books on the subjects. In 1818, he was elected a Fellow of the Royal Society as "a Gentleman well versed in various Branches of Natural Knowledge being desirous of becoming a Fellow of the Royal Society".

== Family and legacy ==
Whitaker married Lucy, daughter of Thomas Thoresby of Leeds, on 13 January 1783. The couple had several children, of whom one, Robert Nowell Whitaker, also became vicar of Whalley.

Whitaker died at Blackburn vicarage on 18 December 1821, and was interred at Holme. A monument raised by public subscription was placed in the Church of St Mary and All Saints, Whalley in 1842. His library was sold at Sotheby's in 1823, and his coins and antiquities, with the exception of his Roman altars and inscriptions, which he bequeathed to St John's College, Cambridge, were dispersed in 1824.

== Works ==
His published works were:

- History of the Original Parish of Whalley and Honour of Clitheroe, in the Counties of Lancaster and York, 1801; 2nd edition 1806, 3rd edition 1818; 4th edition (enlarged by John Gough Nichols and Ponsonby A. Lyons), 1872-6, 2 volumes This work used manuscripts of Thomas Lister Parker.
- History and Antiquities of the Deanery of Craven, 1805, 2nd edition 1812; 3rd edition (by Alfred William Morant) 1878.
- De Motu per Britanniam Civico annis 1745 et 1746, 1809, an account in Latin based on John Home's 'History of the Rebellion of 1745.'
- Life and Original Correspondence of Sir George Radcliffe, Knt., LL.D., the Friend of the Earl of Strafford, 1810. Concerns George Radcliffe.
- The Sermons of Dr. Edwin Sandys, formerly Archbishop of York, with a Life of the Author, 1812.
- Visio Will'i de Petro Plouhman ... or the Vision of William concerning Piers Plouhman, 1813.
- Pierce the Ploughman's Crede, edited from the edition of 1553, 1814.
- Loidis and Elmete, or an Attempt to illustrate . . . the Lower Portions of Airedale and Wharfdale, 1816. An appendix was published in 1821.
- The History of Richmondshire, in the North Riding of Yorkshire, 1823, in 2 volumes. It has thirty-two plates, after J. M. W. Turner.

Whitaker re-edited Ralph Thoresby's Ducatus Leodiensis (2nd edition, with notes and additions, 1816). He also planned, but did not finish, several other works. He published ten occasional sermons and a political speech, and wrote dozens of articles for the Quarterly Review between 1809 and 1818.

== Bibliography ==
- Lee, Sidney, ed. (1900). "Whitaker, Thomas Dunham" . Dictionary of National Biography. Vol. 61. London: Smith, Elder & Co.
- Turner and Dr. Whitaker. Burnley: Towneley Hall Art Gallery & Museums. 1982.
- https://www.oxforddnb.com/display/10.1093/ref:odnb/9780198614128.001.0001/odnb-9780198614128-e-29226

Attribution

This article incorporates text from a publication now in the public domain: "Whitaker, Thomas Dunham". Dictionary of National Biography. London: Smith, Elder & Co. 1885–1900.
