= Jerry Dawson =

Jerry Dawson may refer to:

- Jerry Dawson (footballer, born 1888) (1888–1970), English goalkeeper who played for Burnley
- Jerry Dawson (footballer, born 1909) (1909–1977), Scottish goalkeeper who played for Rangers and Falkirk
