= Church of St John the Divine, Holme Chapel =

Coordinates: 53.7529°N 2.1890°W

- St John the Divine, Holme-in-Cliviger
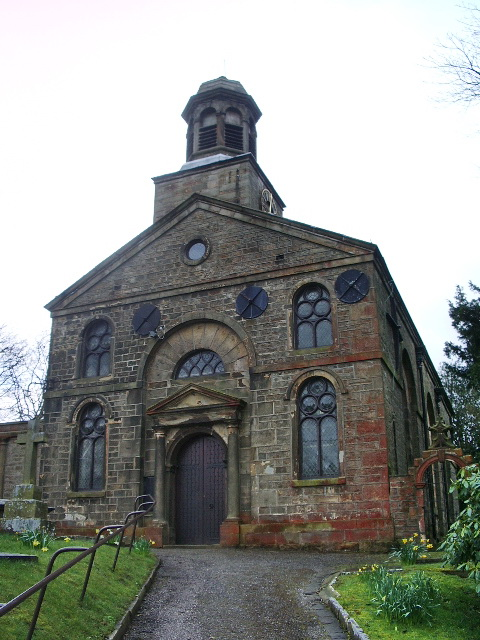
- West front of the church

- Location in the Borough of Burnley
- OS grid reference: SD 876 285
- Location: Holme Chapel, Cliviger, Burnley, Lancashire
- Country: England
- Denomination: Anglican
- Website: St John, Holme Chapel

History
- Status: Parish church
- Dedication: Saint John the Divine
- Consecrated: 29 July 1794

Architecture
- Functional status: Active
- Heritage designation: Grade II
- Designated: 1 April 1953
- Architectural type: Church
- Style: Neoclassical
- Groundbreaking: 1788
- Completed: 1897
- Construction cost: £780

Specifications
- Materials: Sandstone

Administration
- Province: York
- Diocese: Blackburn
- Archdeaconry: Blackburn
- Deanery: Burnley
- Parish: St John the Divine, Holme-in-Cliviger

Clergy
- Vicar: Revd Chris Casey

The Church of St John the Divine is in Burnley Road, Holme Chapel, a village in the civil parish of Cliviger, near Burnley, Lancashire, England. It is an active Anglican parish church in the diocese of Blackburn, and the church is recorded in the National Heritage List for England as a designated Grade II listed building. It was built between 1788 and 1794, replacing a small chapel, and is in simple Classical style. Above the west front is a bell turret with an octagonal cupola, and inside the church are carved oak stalls, moved from a demolished church, which include a poppyhead and misericords.

== History ==
The present church replaced an earlier small chapel, which measured only 42 by 18 feet (12.8 by 5.5 m), and which was described as "a rude but picturesque little building". This chapel, probably built during the reign of Henry VIII and considered the property of the Whitaker family of the Holme, becoming ruinous, was demolished in 1788. It was replaced by the present church, standing on higher ground, at a cost of £870, a contribution to which was made by Dr T. D. Whitaker. The church, which had seating for 400 people, was consecrated on 29 July 1794 by the Rt Revd William Cleaver, Bishop of Chester. Whitaker would be assigned perpetual curate of the new chapel in 1797, and become vicar of the parish (Whalley) in 1809. The chapelry district of St. John, Holme was assigned in 1843. The chancel and vestry were added in 1897.

== Architecture ==
=== Exterior ===
The church is built in squared sandstone, it has dressed quoins, and its roof is probably of slate, although this is obscured by the parapet. Its architectural style is simple Classical. The church has a rectangular plan with a three-bay nave, a two-bay chancel, and a vestry. Around the church is a string course, and at the top is a moulded cornice and a plain parapet. The west front is in two storeys, with a central entrance surrounded by a Tuscan architrave containing a round-headed doorway. This is contained within a round-headed blind arch in which is a lunette. The entrance is flanked by two two-light windows, also round-headed, and containing circular tracery, and there are two similar, but smaller, windows in the storey above. Also in this storey are three tie-bars. At the top of the west front is a pediment containing a round window. On the roof is a bell turret surmounted by an octagonal cupola. Along the sides of the church are windows similar to those in the west front. In the east wall of the chancel is a Venetian window.

=== Interior ===
Inside the church, between the nave and the chancel, is a screen with a large central round-headed arch flanked by lower arches. At the west end is a gallery carried on three semicircular arches. The gallery front has fluted pilasters creating four panels containing the Ten Commandments. The 16th-century oak pulpit is octagonal and has an embattled top. It contains "panels of elaborate pierced flamboyant tracery". Also in the church are two pairs of oak stalls which were moved here from the parish church of Blackburn, which was demolished in 1820. One pair has a stall with a good poppyhead finial, and the other has two misericords, one of which has foliated carving, and the other depicts a mermaid with a mirror and has fish supporters. Some of the panelling in the church is in linenfold style with a vine-trail. The monuments include those of Lawrence Ormerod (who died in 1793), which includes arms and a flaming urn, John Hargreaves (who died in 1825) by George Webster, which has a plain Classical surround with scrolls on the top, and memorials to members of the Whitaker family, including a bust of Dr T. D. Whitaker by C. R. Smith. Also in the church is a painting of General Scarlett.

== Churchyard ==
To the south of the church is an archway surmounted by the remains of a medieval stone cross.

General Sir James Yorke Scarlett (died 1871), known for leading the charge of the Heavy Brigade during the battle of Balaclava in the Crimean War, is buried here. Along with his nephew and heir, Sir John Thursby, 1st Baronet (died 1901).

== Appraisal ==
The church was designated as a Grade II listed building on 1 April 1953. Grade II is the lowest of the three grades of listing and is applied to buildings that are "nationally important and of special interest". In the Buildings of England series, Clare Hartwell and Nikolaus Pevsner comment that the addition of the chancel and vestry in 1897 was "tactfully done", the bell turret is "handsome", but that the west front is "rather bitty". They also say that, apart from the west gallery, the interior is "decidedly disappointing".

== Present day ==
St John's is an active parish church in the deanery of Burnley, the archdeaconry of Blackburn and the diocese of Blackburn. Its benefice is combined with that of St John, Worsthorne.

== See also ==
- Listed buildings in Cliviger
- Holme Hall, Cliviger
- Gothic Revival church buildings in England
