= Arthur Dawson (footballer, born 1907) =

English footballer

Personal information
- Full name: Arthur Dawson
- Date of birth: 22 April 1907
- Place of birth: Cliviger, England
- Date of death: April 1985 (aged 77–78)
- Place of death: Shrewsbury, England
- Height: 5 ft 8 in (1.73 m)
- Position: Outside forward

Senior career*
Years	Team	Apps	(Gls)
–	Portsmouth Rovers	?	(?)
1928–1929	Burnley	0	(0)
1929–1930	Lancaster Town	?	(?)
1930	Nelson	0	(0)
1931	Nelson	10	(0)
- * Club domestic league appearances and goals

Arthur Dawson (22 April 1907 – April 1985) was an English professional footballer who played as an outside forward. After starting his career in local football with Portsmouth Rovers, he had spells with Burnley and Lancaster Town in the late 1920s. Dawson played 10 matches in the Football League Third Division North for Nelson in the 1930–31 season.

== Biography ==
Arthur Dawson was born on 22 April 1907 in Cliviger, Lancashire. He was the nephew of England international football goalkeeper Jerry Dawson. He died in Shrewsbury, Shropshire, in April 1985.

== Career ==
Dawson started his career in local football with Portsmouth Rovers. He was signed by Football League First Division side Burnley on amateur terms in August 1928 and was offered a professional contract a month later. Dawson played 15 Central League matches for the reserves, but failed to break into the first team and was released by the club at the end of the 1928–29 season without having made a senior appearance.

A return to non-league football followed and Dawson signed for Lancaster Town in June 1929. He spent a season with Lancaster and was not a consistent first-team player, but was part of the team that won the Lancashire Combination in the 1929–30 season. In September 1930, Dawson joined Nelson of the Football League Third Division North on a free transfer. However, he failed to make an impression and was released in December of the same year. Dawson re-signed for Nelson in March 1931, and subsequently made his Football League debut on 14 March in the 1–8 loss to Carlisle United. He went on to play at outside-left in all of Nelson's final 10 matches of the season. The team won just one of these games, a 2–1 victory over Wigan Borough on 3 April. The ten matches proved to be Nelson's last in the Football League as they finished bottom of the league and failed re-election. Dawson left the club in the summer of 1931 and retired from football.
