= Listed buildings in Great Harwood =

Great Harwood is a town in Hyndburn, Lancashire, England. It contains 16 buildings that are recorded in the National Heritage List for England as designated listed buildings. Of these, one is listed at Grade I, the highest grade, four are at Grade II*, the middle grade, and the others are at Grade II. The major building in the town is the former manor house, Martholme: this and two associated structures are listed. The other listed buildings include churches and associated structures, farmhouses, large houses, a railway viaduct, a town hall, a bank, a public house, a clock tower, a war memorial, and a telephone kiosk.

== Key ==
| Grade | Criteria |
|---|---|
| I | Buildings of exceptional interest, sometimes considered to be internationally important |
| II* | Particularly important buildings of more than special interest |
| II | Buildings of national importance and special interest |

== Buildings ==
| Name and location | Photograph | Date | Notes | Grade |
|---|---|---|---|---|
| Martholme; 53.80000°N 2.37680°W | | Medieval | A manor house that was altered and extended in the 16th and 17th centuries, it is built in sandstone with slate roofs. The house has a T-shaped plan, and consists of part of a medieval hall and service wing in three storeys, and a cross-wing in two storeys added in the 17th century. The windows are mullioned, and inside the house is medieval timber-framing. | I |
| St Bartholomew's Church; 53.79006°N 2.40552°W | | 15th century | The oldest part of the church is the tower, and most of the body of the church dates from the 16th century; it is in Perpendicular style. In 1880–81 Paley and Austin added a new chancel and vestry and made other alterations. The church is constructed in stone with a stone-slate roof, and consists of a nave with a clerestory, a chancel with a vestry, and a west tower. The tower is in four stages with buttresses, a stair turret, a west window with a niche above, clock faces on two sides, and an embattled parapet. | II* |
| Gatehouse, Martholme; 53.79969°N 2.37696°W | | 1561 | The former gatehouse is in sandstone with a stone-slate roof. It has two storeys and a symmetrical three-bay front. In the centre is a wide rounded arch, now glazed, above which is an inscribed plaque and a mullioned and transomed window. Flanking these on each side are mullioned windows in both storeys. | II* |
| Outer Archway, Martholme; 53.79948°N 2.37697°W | | 1607 | The archway is in a sloped wall that is built in stone. It consists of a semicircular-headed arch with crow-stepping, and is surmounted by a finial. Above the arch on both sides is a carved shield. | II* |
| Heys Farmhouse; 53.80596°N 2.40617°W | — | 17th century | The farmhouse is in stone with a stone-slate roof, and has two storeys, three bays, and a lean-to extension. At the rear is a buttress. Two mullioned windows remain, the other windows having been altered. A carved head has been incorporated into the extension. | II |
| White Goat Farmhouse; 53.81096°N 2.40565°W | — | Late 17th century (probable) | The former farmhouse is in stone, and has a roof, mainly of slate and with some stone-slate. It has two storeys and four bays with an outshut to the rear. Some mullioned windows remain; others have been altered. | II |
| Allsprings; 53.79617°N 2.40548°W | — | 1838 | A large house in rendered stone with a slate roof in Tudor style. It has two storeys, a symmetrical five-bay front, and a two-bay wing at the rear. On the front is a two-storey embattled porch that has a Tudor arched doorway with a hood mould and a fanlight. This is flanked by gables with crocketed finials. Behind the front is a tower-like structure that is also gabled, and which has a parapet hiding the corner chimneys. | II |
| Church of Our Lady and St Hubert and presbytery 53.78526°N 2.40068°W | | 1858–59 | A Roman Catholic church by E. W. Pugin in the style of about 1300. It is in sandstone with slate roofs, and consists of a nave, transeptal aisles, a chancel with a three-sided apse and a Lady Chapel, and a west steeple. The tower has three stages, with a stair turret, a doorway, a niche containing a statue. On the tower is a splay spire with crocketed gablets. The presbytery, at the northwest corner is also by Pugin, and is in a similar style. | II* |
| Martholme Viaduct; 53.80054°N 2.37866°W | | 1870–77 | The viaduct was built to carry the Great Harwood arm of the Lancashire and Yorkshire Railway over the valley of the River Calder. It is in sandstone and consists of ten rounded arches, with a span of 40 feet (12 m) at a height of 65 feet (20 m). The viaduct is in a slightly curved line, and the arches have an impost band and a solid parapet. | II |
| Memorial cross 53.78509°N 2.40078°W | — | 1888 | The cross is in the churchyard of the Church of Our Lady and St Hubert. It is in stone and consists of a plinth of three octagonal steps, a square pedestal, and a shaft with a crucifix. There are carvings on the base of the shaft and on the pedestal, and an inscription on the pedestal. | II |
| Town Hall; 53.78564°N 2.40781°W | | 1898–1900 | The town hall was designed by Briggs and Wolstenholme in free Baroque style. It is in stone with hipped slate roofs, and has 2 1/2 storeys. There are symmetrical fronts of five and four bays. The outer bays of the entrance front are gabled with ball finials, and contain lunettes in the ground floor and bullseye windows in the gable. The central doorway has a Gibbs surround and a segmental pediment, and is flanked by sash windows. | II |
| National Westminster Bank; 53.78588°N 2.40786°W | — | c. 1900 | Built for the Manchester and County Bank on a corner site, the building is in free Jacobean style. It is in stone with a slate roof, and has on the corner an octagonal turret with a copper-clad dome. The building is in two storeys with attics, and at the far end of each front is a gable with finials. The windows are mullioned and/or transomed. The entrance on Queen Street has a doorway with a fanlight, and a corniced canopy. | II |
| Mercer Memorial Tower; 53.78560°N 2.40816°W | | 1903 | The clock tower commemorates John Mercer, a textile chemist, and is sited in the Town Hall Square. It is in sandstone, and in free Baroque style. The building has a base with rounded arches, Ionic pilasters, and a balustrade with corner finials. The turret has two stages, the upper stage having clock faces on all sides, and paired granite columns at the corners. On the top is a copper-clad dome with a weathervane. | II |
| Victoria public house 53.78127°N 2.40512°W | | 1905 | The public house is in sandstone with a Welsh slate roof. It has two storeys, a three-bay front, and a central doorway with a canopy on consoles, above which is a plaque. The main interest is the interior, which has been little altered and contains Art Nouveau features. | II |
| War memorial 53.79254°N 2.40437°W | | 1926 | The war memorial stands in Memorial Park, and is in Creetown granite with lead lettering. It is in the form of a square tapering obelisk on a plinth and a base of three steps. The obelisk has three main stages, and a pyramidal cap. On the memorial are the names of those lost in the two World Wars and subsequent conflicts, and inscriptions referring to those lost, those who returned, and to the sufferings of the civilians who remained at home. | II |
| Telephone kiosk 53.78580°N 2.40847°W | — | 1935 | The K6 type telephone kiosk, designed by Giles Gilbert Scott, stands outside the Wellington Hotel. Constructed in cast iron with a square plan and a dome, it has three unperforated crowns in the top panels. | II |
