= St John's Church, Great Harwood =

Coordinates: 53.7827°N 2.4066°W

St John's Church
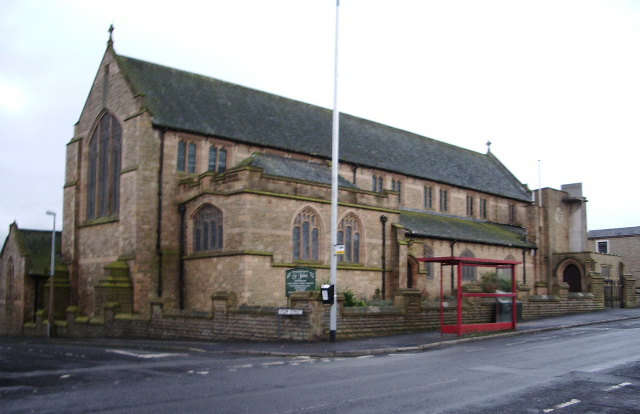
- St John's Church, Great Harwood, from the northeast

- Location in Hyndburn
- OS grid reference: SD 73305 31894
- Location: St Hubert's Road, Great Harwood, Lancashire
- Country: England
- Denomination: Anglican

History
- Status: Former parish church
- Consecrated: 1 October 1912

Architecture
- Architect: Austin and Paley
- Architectural type: Church
- Style: Gothic Revival
- Groundbreaking: 27 May 1911
- Completed: 1912
- Closed: 1 March 2006
- Demolished: 2009

St John's Church was an Anglican parish church in St Hubert's Road, Great Harwood, Lancashire, England. Its benefice has been united with that of St Bartholomew, Great Harwood.

== History ==
St John's Church originated as a mission church in the Old Butts Chapel in 1881. In 1898 a new church was built, and in 1908 St John's became a separate parish. It was decided to build a new church, the foundation stone of which was laid on 27 May 1911. It was designed by the architects Austin and Paley of Lancaster. The new church was consecrated on 1 October 1912 by the Rt Revd Edmund Knox, bishop of Manchester. There had been plans to build a west tower but, when the funds were raised for this in the 1950s, it was discovered that the foundations were inadequate, and a new northwest porch was built instead. This was opened in 1961. The church was declared redundant on 1 March 2006, and was demolished in 2009. Its reredos was moved to St Margaret's Church, Oldham.

== Architecture ==
The church was constructed in stone, its architectural style being late Perpendicular. The authors of the Buildings of England series describe it as having been "handsome and assured with well-grouped elements", and having a "good if sober interior".

== See also ==
- List of ecclesiastical works by Austin and Paley (1895–1914)
