= Coal Clough Wind Farm =

Onshore wind farms in Lancaster, England

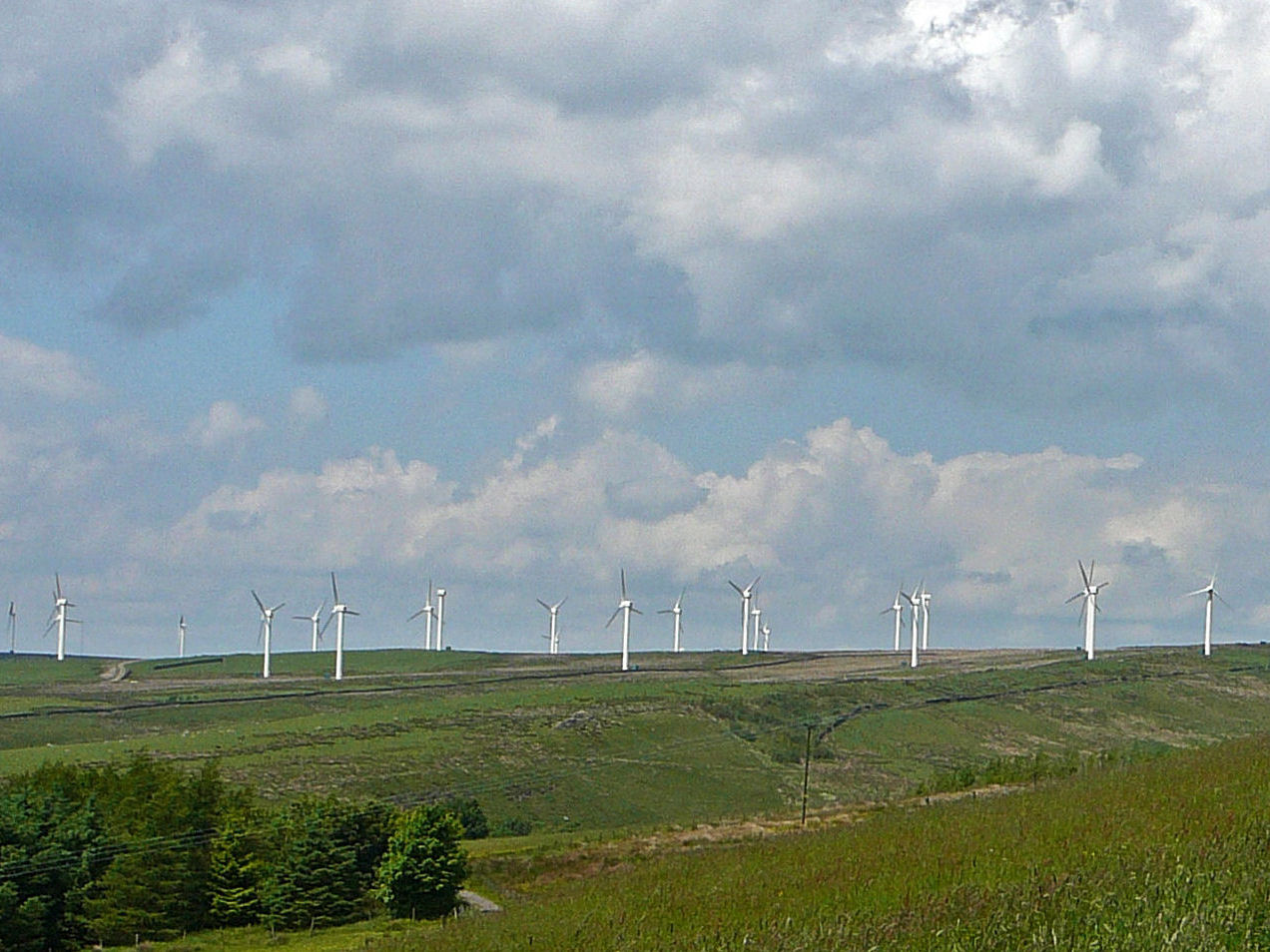
- Coal Clough Wind Farm
- Country: England, United Kingdom
- Location: Burnley, Lancashire, North West England
- Coordinates: 53.749°N 2.152°W
- Status: Operational
- Commission date: 9 December 1992 → (Re-com) 30 April 2015
- Owner: Scottish Power
- Site elevation: 365 metres (1,198 ft)

Power generation
- Units operational: [present] 8 x 2 Mw
- Make and model: [1992 - 2015] - Vestas: WD34 [2015 - present] Gamesa: G80
- Nameplate capacity: [Present = 16 Mw]

External links
- Website: scottishpowerrenewables.com
- Commons: Related media on Commons

Coal Clough Wind Farm is one of the oldest onshore wind farms in England. The wind farm, which was built for Scottish Power, produced electricity from originally 24 Vestas WD34 wind turbines. It had a total nameplate capacity of 9.6 MW of electricity, enough to serve the average needs of 5,500 homes. It is situated near Burnley, Lancashire in the parish of Cliviger, near Coal Clough Farm, on the edge of Stiperden Moor in the South Pennines. For a few weeks it was the largest wind farm in the UK, until the much larger Penrhyddlan and Llidiartywaun wind farms (now called Llandinam) in Powys, Wales overtook it. It narrowly remained the largest in England until Coldham opened in Cambridgeshire in November 2005. The record was then taken yet again by Scout Moor Wind Farm 7 miles (11 km) to the south west until May 2009 where Whitelee Wind Farm took and now holds it with 215 units with a total output capacity of 539 Mw.

In 2009 Scottish Power originally announced plans to replace the existing turbines with twelve 2 MW units with an estimated maximum height 110 metres (361 ft).

After many years of ups and downs during the planning process, the announced proposal on re-powering the wind farm was soon granted permission after an agreement was met on installing only 8 units (instead of the original plan for 12) and the environmental & logistical issues were worked out and finalized.

From summer 2014 till spring 2015 work began on site which involved the decommissioning & removal of the existing 24 turbines (and foundations), the laying of new cabling and drainage, placement of the new turbine's foundations, upgrading/building service roads, new substation installation, the erection of the new turbines and the re-commissioning of the upgraded site.

The new and improved Coal Clough Wind Farm is set to be in operation for its full 25 years "Usefulness" life span, and will then be decommissioned and removed from site to be either refurbished and sold on to businesses worldwide or sent to be recycled.

Specifications
Manufacturer	Gamesa
New Models	G80
Tower height - G80	70 metres (230 ft)
Blade length - G80	40 metres (131 ft)
Total maximum height - G80	110 metres (361 ft)
Turbine weight	
Maximum turbine effect	2.0 megawatts (2,700 hp)
Installed turbines	8
Total nameplate capacity (maximum output)	16 megawatts (21,000 hp)
Electricity generated per annum	
Capacity factor	30%
