= Labour Parliament =

The Labour Parliament was an alternative parliament in the United Kingdom formed by trade union delegates. The Parliament sat for one session from 6–18 March 1854. Formed in response to a lockout organized by cotton mill owners in Preston, Lancashire, the Parliament sought to elevate and centralize the UK labour movement by forming a committee to support strike actions across the country and establish worker-owned cooperatives.

During its first and only session, delegates laid the foundation of the organization, establishing a weekly levy on workers' wages that would go towards supporting strikes and buying land. The Parliament, which was supported by Karl Marx and Pierre-Joseph Proudhon, was met with a mixed response. Trade unionists involved in organizing against the Preston lock-out accused its founders of being distracted from their central goal of winning a 10% raise for Preston workers.

== Background ==
In the early 1850s, workers across the cotton industry won wage increases following improved trade and a shortage of labour. Mill owners in Preston, Lancashire managed to avoid the wave of wage increase by forming an association. The association of Preston mill owners decided to lock out their employees in October 1853 in anticipation of a strike, affecting 20,000 workers. The workers managed to prolong the conflict into 1854 by collecting over £100,000 in subscriptions. In response to the lockout, Chartist and trade unionist Ernest Jones proposed the formation of a "Labour Parliament" that would unite the unions of towns across the United Kingdom. In an editorial published in The People's Paper, he wrote:

What I would recommend and urge, is this: make your organisation national at once, let mass meetings be called simultaneously in every town of the kingdom, and, at each of these an organisation be formed in connection with a great central committee (the existing Trades bodies into one amalgamated committee of all trades in each district): at each of these meetings let an organised system for raising regular weekly subscriptions be adopted; where the towns are large, let them be divided into wards for that purpose.

While the Parliament was not officially a Chartist project, it was an extension of the vision of the National Charter Association which Jones shared. The project received endorsements from Louis Blanc, Victor Hugo, Pierre-Joseph Proudhon and Karl Marx. The project was also supported by the Preston cardroom hand union and Preston union leader Mortimer Grimshaw, in addition to labour groups in London and Manchester. Karl Marx was invited to serve as an honorary delegate during the first session of the Labour Parliament, which he declined. In a letter published in The People's Paper on 18 March 1854, he wrote:

If the Labour Parliament proves true to the idea that called it into life, some future historian will have to record that there existed in the year 1854 two Parliaments in England, a Parliament at London, and a Parliament at Manchester – a Parliament of the rich, and a Parliament of the poor – but that men sat only in the Parliament of the men and not in the Parliament of the masters.

== Session ==
The first and only session of the Labour Parliament from 6–18 March 1854. During that session, the parliament approved a constitution and the collection of a weekly "national labour revenue." The national labour revenue would be collected in the form of a levy placed on the wages of workers. The levy would be used to help fund strikes across the country, and the parliament also planned on using funds raised to purchase land for collective cultivation and the establishment of cooperative mills.

The Parliament only stood for one session. Besides the opposition it faced from the working class, the levies established by the Parliament were insufficient to cover the salaries of its executive committee.

=== Members ===
Elected officials
Name	City	Role
John Clarke Cropper		Chair
John Teer	Manchester	General Secretary
James Williams	Stockport	Treasurer and Executive-Elect
James Finlen	London	Executive-Elect
George Harrison	Nottingham	Executive-Elect
Abraham Robinson	Wilsden	Executive-Elect
James Williams	Stockport	Executive-Elect
Joseph Hogg	Newcastle	Executive-Elect
Ernest Jones	London	Honorary Executive

The Manchester Times described Ernest Jones' role on the executive committee as having "all powers except that of voting."

Labour Parliament delegates
Region	Name	Appointed by
London	Ernest Jones	
London	James Bligh	
London	James Finlen	
London	Harry Jeffreys	
Manchester	John Petzler	
Manchester	E. C. Cropper	
Manchester	John Teer	
Manchester	James Brierley	Cotton skein dryers
Birmingham	John Oxford	
Birmingham	William Jackson	
Leek	Isaac Hogg	Silk twisters
Leek	Jeremiah Earls	Silk twisters
Newcastle	Joseph Hogg	
Newcastle	George Hobart	
North Lancashire	James Candelet	North Lancashire Union of Cordwainers
North Lancashire	James Smith	North Lancashire Union of Cordwainers
Barnsley	Edwing Goldring	
Bedford	John Flemming	
Bury	Matthew Shaw	Weavers' union
Coxhoe	John Robinson	
Crook	Wm. Wilson	
Doncaster	B. Armfield	
Haworth	E. Tidswell	
Hyde	George Candelet	
Keighley	Wm. Emmott	
Nottingham	George Harrison	
Preston	Jonathan Westray	Amalgamated committees
Stockport	James Williams	
Torquay	George Brewer	
Walsden and Thornton	Abraham Robinson	
Wigan	John Smith	

== Structure ==
The Labour Parliament was a legislative body that serve as a central, amalgamated committee representing trade unions in tows throughout the United Kingdom.

The Parliament, which Jones envisioned being based in a manufacturing center like Lancashire and Manchester, aimed to turn local labour actions into a national organization to support the labour movement. While the Labour Parliament would be the supreme authority, the parliamentarians only intended for it to meet once a year. During their time out of session, a small executive branch would be empowered to act on their behalf. Members of the executive committee would be elected by levy-paying members.

The Parliament planned on establishing departments for agriculture, manufacturing, distribution, labour price regulation and strike, lock-out and labour legislation assistance. These departments would assist in the purchase and management of land, factories and workshops.

== Opposition ==
The Labour Parliament received some opposition within the labour movement. The parliament, which was proposed during the Preston strike of 1853–1854 was opposed by some Preston unionists on the basis that it distracted from their central aim of receiving a 10% raise.

Mortimer Grimshaw, who was elected as an honorary delegate to the Labour Parliament was later censored at a meeting of the Preston weavers for his involvement. Similarly, Jones was denied the opportunity to speak at a meeting in Hoghton, where the committee expressed concern he was unable to focus on their core demand. In general, the workers who opposed the parliament believed it was unpractical.

== See also ==
- Council of Workers' and Soldiers' Delegates (1917)
- Trades Union Congress (England and Wales)
- International Trade Union Confederation
