= Cliviger =

Civil parish in Lancashire, England

Coordinates: 53.765°N 2.206°W

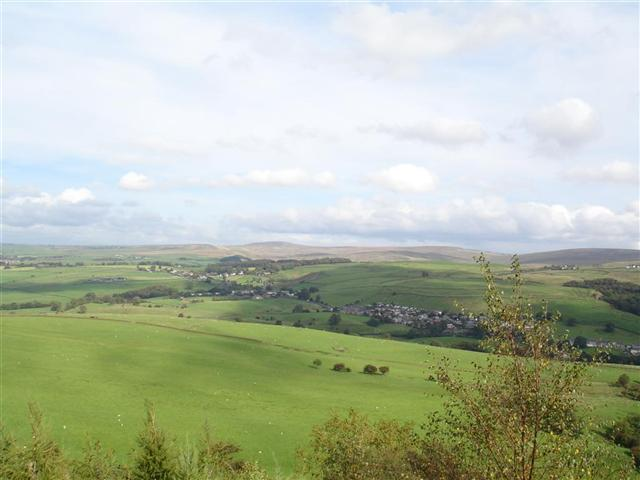
- A view over Cliviger

- Shown within Burnley Borough Location within Lancashire
- Area: 10.53 sq mi (27.3 km^{2})
- Population: 2,238 (2011)
  - Density: 213/sq mi (82/km^{2})
- OS grid reference: SD864299
- Civil parish: Cliviger
- District: Burnley
- Shire county: Lancashire
- Region: North West
- Country: England
- Sovereign state: United Kingdom
- Post town: BURNLEY
- Postcode district: BB10
- Dialling code: 01282
- Police: Lancashire
- Fire: Lancashire
- Ambulance: North West
- UK Parliament: Burnley

Cliviger /ˈklɪvɪdʒər/ is a civil parish in the Borough of Burnley, in Lancashire, England. It is situated to the southeast of Burnley, and northwest of Todmorden. According to the 2011 census, the parish has a population of 2,238.

Although the whole parish lies within the Borough of Burnley it is actually split between three post towns, with a few farms lying in either the Todmorden or Bacup postal areas. Nowadays, it is mainly a dormitory area for people working in Burnley and other towns in East Lancashire and West Yorkshire.

Contrary to popular (and in some cases mistaken local) belief there is no village of "Cliviger". The principal settlements within the parish are Walk Mill, Southward Bottom, Overtown, Mereclough and Holme Chapel.

== Toponymy ==
There is some lack of certainty as to the origin of the name Cliviger. The Rev. Dr. Thomas Dunham Whitaker, historian, theologian and curate of Holme Chapel and later also vicar of the parishes of Whalley and Blackburn (until 1821), conjectured that the origin was Saxon, from "clivvig" and "shire", meaning "rocky district". However, in 1922 Eilert Ekwall felt that the name meant "steep slope farmland" having been derived from Old English clif æcer. Old spellings that have been used include "Clyvechir" (1258) and "Clyuacher" (1290)

== History ==
The area has been the site of human habitation for thousands of years. The remains of a Bronze Age burial mound is known to exist on Moseley Height above Mereclough and was excavated by Burnley Historical Society in 1950. Finds included cremation urns, other pot sherds, spindle whorls, beads and flint tools. These are now in the collection at Towneley Hall, although sadly no longer on display. Another burial cairn existed behind Law House at Mereclough. An Iron Age gold torc was also found, which is now in the Manchester Museum. There have also been some Roman coin finds, and suggestions that remains at Easden and another site near Mereclough were small Roman forts.

Cliviger is not mentioned in the Domesday survey, and the survey of the wider area (Blackburn Hundred) is brief. Around 1160 a "plough-land", possibly the whole of the township, was granted to the recently founded Kirkstall Abbey (Leeds), and the monks made a grange here. However sometime later Richard de Elland (the son of the previous tenant) was allowed reclaim it, and Robert de Lacy (died 1193), lord of Clitheroe granted Accrington to the monks instead. Later returned to them, Kirkstall would hold Cliviger until 1287, when Henry de Lacy, Earl of Lincoln promised them a fixed-rent in exchange. Cliviger bordered on the Forest of Rossendale and a boundary bank called the "Old Dyke" can still be traced southeast of Thieveley Pike (close to the southern border of the modern parish). The de Lacy's held land in demesne here as part of the Honour of Clitheroe, which would become incorporated into the Duchy of Lancaster. A salt road route from Cheshire via Manchester to Knaresborough and Wetherby has been ascertained to have passed over Thieveley Pike.

In 1588, the queen (Elizabeth I) demised to her principal surgeon, Robert Balthrope, a coal mine in Cliviger. This was later transferred to John Towneley of Towneley. There was a limestone hushing operation at Shedden Clough in the 17th century. Lead mining was attempted at Thieveley in the early 17th and mid 18th centuries. The site of this venture at Black Clough is protected as a scheduled monument. Also near Pot Oven Farm, there are the remains of a blast furnace constructed around 1700 for the Spencer partnership. Although it had become a pottery by 1760, it is thought to be the first blast furnace built in Lancashire.

Open cast coal mining took place in the 1940s and 50s above Thieveley Scout and on Deerplay Moor and were the site of two walking draglines, "Cilla" and "Charybdis". The areas were subsequently back-filled and landscaped.

There are three war memorials in the parish – these are located outside the church in Holme Chapel; at the Mount Zion chapel in Walk Mill; and also the Weir war memorial is located near the old Deerplay Inn, although the village of Weir itself is within the parish of Bacup, not Cliviger. There are three official war graves from the First World War in the churchyard at Holme Chapel, and a casualty of the Boer War is buried in the old chapel graveyard in Mereclough.

== Governance ==
Cliviger was once a township in the ancient parish of Whalley. This became a civil parish in 1866, forming part of the Burnley Rural District from 1894. In 1897 an area of the parish including parts of the villages of Cornholme and Portsmouth, (Note: The old border extended on the north side of the Yorkshire Calder to Redwater Clough.) was added to Todmorden thus transferring to the West Riding of Yorkshire. Since 1974 Cliviger has formed part of the Borough of Burnley.

Cliviger Parish Council consists of 9 councillors who serve a 4-year term of office, with council meetings held once a month. Cliviger is made up of five enumeration districts named Mereclough, Overtown, Walk Mill, Southward Bottom and Holme Chapel, the last being regarded as the village centre, with a primary school (St John the Divine C.E. Primary School), the church and the village hall. It is also part of the Cliviger with Worsthorne ward of Burnley Borough Council, along with the neighbouring parish of Worsthorne-with-Hurstwood. The ward elects three councillors, currently Beki Hughes and Jack Launer of the Green Party and Ivor Emo (Conservative). Cliviger is represented on Lancashire County Council as part of the Burnley Rural division, represented since 2017 by Cosima Towneley (Conservative).

The Member of Parliament for Burnley, the constituency into which the parish falls, is Oliver Ryan of the Labour Party, who was first elected in 2024.

== Geography ==
The parish is located at the northwestern entrance to Cliviger Gorge, which extends southeast to the (now) West Yorkshire town of Todmorden. It is regarded as a remarkable example of a glacial valley that follows a fault line cutting through the South Pennine Moors. The highest point in the parish is Hoof Stones Height on Stiperden Moor to the northeast, at 1,573 feet (479.5 m) above sea level (on the county boundary). To the west are Heald Moor and Deerplay Moor, attaining 1,470 feet (448.1 m) at Thieveley Pike. There is a legend that a spectral huntsman and his hounds appear in the gorge every Halloween. A hair-raising account of a journey through the gorge on horseback is made in Harrison Ainsworth's classic novel of magic and witchcraft, "The Lancashire Witches".

The valley is a major transport link between Lancashire and Yorkshire, and both the A646 road and a railway line pass through it (there was previously a railway station at Holme Chapel). However a road called 'The Long Causeway' which runs above the valley (passing Coal Clough Wind Farm), is believed to be ancient in its origins, possibly dating back to the Bronze Age.

The parish contains the sources of Lancashire's River Calder, Yorkshire's River Calder and the River Irwell. It lies astride the main watershed of Great Britain, as the Lancashire Calder and the Irwell flow west (via the rivers Ribble and Mersey respectively) to the Irish Sea, whilst the Yorkshire Calder flows east (via the Aire, the Ouse and the Humber) to the North Sea. Everage Clough, a tributary of the Lancashire Calder, forms the parish's western boundary as far as Crown Point, the location of the Singing Ringing Tree sculpture. The River Brun, its tributary Rock Water, and its tributary Shedden Clough form the parish's northern boundary.

=== Mereclough ===
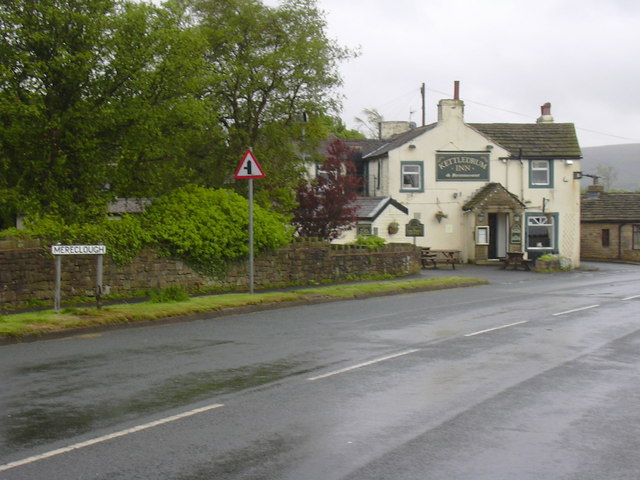
Kettledrum Inn, Mereclough

Mereclough is at the junction of Red Lees Road with The Long Causeway. A Wesleyan Methodist chapel was built at Mereclough in 1824. There were two public houses in Mereclough, the Fighting Cocks Inn and the Kettledrum Inn, although only the latter remains since the closure of the Fighting Cocks in 2019. Colonel Charles Towneley's horse Kettledrum won the 1861 Epsom Derby. Popular legend has it that the winnings from this particular race paid for the building of the pub, but since there has been an ale-house on this site since at least 1848 then it may only have been that the pub was renamed to commemorate the victory. A silver-mounted horses-hoof inkwell kept behind the bar in the pub is claimed to be from the beast itself.

=== Overtown ===
Overtown is at the junctions of Red Lees Road with Mount Lane and Greencliffe Lane. The parish playing fields and the Jerry Dawson Sports Pavilion are located on Mount Lane.

=== Walk Mill ===
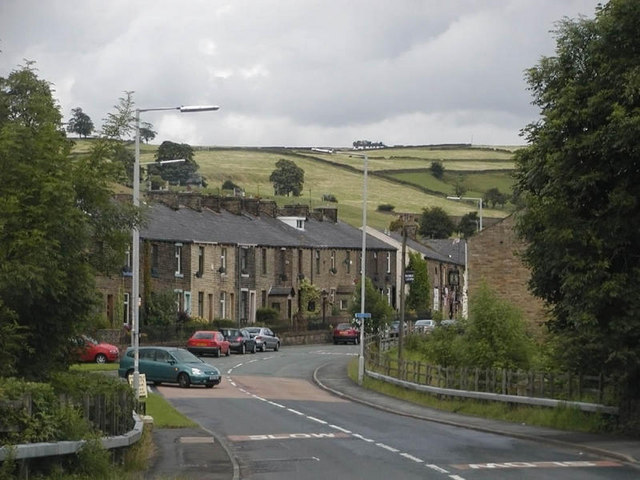
Older housing in Walk Mill

Walk Mill is on Burnley Road, where it passes over the River Calder. Barcroft is to the north and Dyneley is southwest. In 1311 Henry de Lacy held 80 acres of land and a water-mill in Cliviger. A medieval fulling mill (often water-powered) could also be known as a walk mill. Mount Zion Independent Methodist chapel was built in 1853 and superseded an earlier building of 1835. The engine house of Railway Pit drift mine still survives (installed in 1848) next to the chapel. A weaving shed was built here in 1876, in-between the wars there were 736 looms operating. It closed in 1958 and has been demolished. A public house called the Gordon Lennox opened in 1892, named after Lady Emily Frances Gordon-Lennox, daughter of Charles Towneley and wife of Lord Alexander Gordon-Lennox. It superseded an earlier building across the road, and has since been demolished to make way for a housing development.

=== Southward Bottom ===
Southward Bottom is centered on the junction of Red Lees Road and Burnley Road. The River Calder is joined by Easden Clough near Honey Holme farm. In the 1840s there was a drift colliery here called the Turner Carr Level.

=== Holme Chapel ===
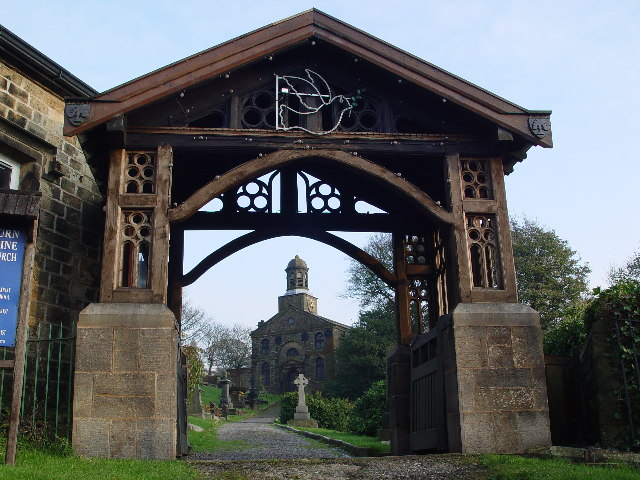
Church of St John the Divine, Holme Chapel

Holme Chapel is on Burnley Road in the centre of the parish (although its most southeasterly settlement) and is regarded as the village centre, with a primary school (St John the Divine C.E. Primary School), St. John's church and the village hall. Holme is to the southeast. There are two public houses, the Ram Inn and Queen Hotel.

A small chapel, probably built here during the reign of Henry VIII and considered the property of the Whitaker family of the Holme, becoming ruinous, was demolished in 1788. St John the Divine Church in Holme Chapel was consecrated in 1794. The Rev. Dr. Thomas Dunham Whitaker would later write that he had contributed more than a moiety toward its construction. The church also contains two 15th century misericords, which probably originated at Whalley Abbey.

== Demography ==
According to the 2011 United Kingdom census, the parish has a population of 2,238, a decrease from 2,350 in the 2001 census. This represents a decline of 5% over ten years. The parish has an area of 2,727 hectares (10.53 sq mi; 27.27 km^{2}), giving a population density of 0.82 inhabitants per hectare (210/sq mi; 82/km^{2}). The small developed part of the parish, adjoining Burnley, was included in the Burnley built-up area, defined in the 2011 census which had a population of 149,422.

In 2011 the average (mean) age of residents was 48 years, with a roughly even distribution between males and females. The racial composition was 99.3% White (98.7% White British), 0.4% Asian, 0.2% Mixed and 0.1% Other. The largest religious groups were Christian (80.1%) and Muslim (0.3%). 65.4% of adults between the ages of 16 and 74 were classed as economically active and in work.

Population of Cliviger parish over time
| Year | 1901 | 1911 | 1921 | 1931 | 1951 | 1961 | 2001 | 2011 |
|---|---|---|---|---|---|---|---|---|
| Population | 1,669 | 1,827 | 1,675 | 1,569 | 1,526 | 1,580 | 2,350 | 2,238 |

== Social life and festivals ==
Clivger's social life largely revolves around its four surviving pubs, the church, school and village hall in Holme Chapel and the Mount Zion Methodist church in Walk Mill. The school and churches play host to familiar national organisations such as Brownies and Rainbows, whilst the village hall hosts local interest groups, activity groups for senior citizens and mother-and-toddler groups amongst other things. An annual flower show also takes place at the village hall in August each year, whilst a fete and duck race take place at the recreation ground on Park Road every May. The Holme Sheep Fair (Lonk Sheep Breeders' Association), held in September, has been going on for hundreds of years. Today it also includes Holme Sheepdog Trials Association championship and the Thieveley Pike fell race organized by Clayton-le-Moors Harriers. In June 2017, the Todmorden Agricultural Show was held in Holme Chapel, due to the organisers being unable to secure the use of Centre Vale Park in the town

== Notable people ==
There appears to have been a family called "de Clivacher" in the 14th century. The last known member of the family was Cecilia de Clivacher who died shortly before the accession of Edward I to the throne of England. After that the name becomes extinct.

The parish is the historical home of the Whitaker family, possibly the most notable being 16th century theologian William Whitaker. William Whitaker's son, Alexander Whitaker, was instrumental in the founding of the Jamestown colony in what is now Virginia, United States. Alexander converted many local First Nation Americans, including most notably Pocahontas, daughter of Powhatan, chief of the Powhatan Confederacy. The Baptism of Pocahontas is depicted in a painting of the same name by John Gadsby Chapman and now hangs in the US Capitol building, Washington DC.

The Reverend Thomas Dunham Whitaker, often called "the historian of Whalley", was curate of St John's from 1797, and later vicar of the parishes of Whalley and Blackburn. A keen naturalist, The Rev. Whitaker is credited with planting many of the trees in the immediate vicinity of Holme Chapel.

Ormerod House was the home of the Thursby family—notable members include General James Yorke Scarlett; and also the mother of German Korvettenkapitän Peter-Erich Cremer (1911–1992), one of the most decorated U-boat aces of the Second World War (and ultimately adjutant to Grand Admiral Karl Dönitz), was a Thursby.

Notable residents of the parish, past and present, also include

- Titus Thornber, historian and naturalist.
- Edward "Eddy" Rawlinson, former newspaper photographer and picture editor of the Manchester edition of the Daily Mirror.
- Sir Simon Towneley KCVO, KCSG (1921–2022), former High Sheriff and Lord Lieutenant of Lancashire, and elder brother of Sir Peregrine Worsthorne (1923–2020).
- Lady Mary Towneley MBE, late wife of Sir Simon Towneley. She was a notable horsewoman and close friend of Princess Anne, who did an incredible amount of work to open up many forgotten bridleways and pack-horse routes in Northern England. She was instrumental in bringing about the construction of the Pennine Bridleway long-distance route. A loop of this route which circumnavigates Cliviger is named the Mary Towneley Loop in her honour. Her other achievements include recreating Dick Turpin's legendary ride from London to York, and also taking part in the Vienna to Budapest endurance ride which she would have won had she not stopped to help a fellow competitor involved in an accident. Lady Mary died in 2001 at the age of 65.
- Thomas Dunham Whitaker (1759–1821), clergyman and topographer, undertook landscape improvements in the Cliviger area, and oversaw the planting of approximately half a million trees between 1785 and 1815.
- General Sir James Yorke Scarlett (1799–1871), known for leading the charge of the Heavy Brigade at the Battle of Balaclava in the Crimean War, is buried at St John's church.
- Sir John Thursby, 1st Baronet (1826–1901), landowner, military officer and sportsman; from Ormerod House
- Eric Halsall (1920–1996), long-term commentator on BBC TV series One Man and His Dog.
- John McArdle (born 1949) and his wife Kathy Jamieson (born 1957), the Liverpool-born Brookside actor lived here in the 1990s.
- Sir Paul Stephenson (born 1953), former commissioner of the Metropolitan Police.

and Sport

- Jerry Dawson (1888–1970), played 522 games for Burnley as goalkeeper. Dawson was born in Cliviger and lived all his life in the parish. He is notable for the fact that he missed playing in the 1914 FA Cup Final (which Burnley won) due to illness. Concerned that this illness might affect the whole team's chances (and at the time, substitutes were not allowed) he had told the manager the day before that he would not be fit to play, thus allowing the team to field a fit 'keeper. As a reward for his thoughtfulness and sportsmanship, the FA decided to award Dawson a winner's medal despite the fact that he hadn't played. The tradition is carried on to this day, in that all players selected to be in the team which wins the FA Cup final are presented with a winner's medal, regardless of whether they have played or not. The sports pavilion on the playing fields at Mount Lane was rededicated as the "Jerry Dawson Pavilion" in 2010.
- Jimmy Robson (1939–2021), footballer, played 455 games, including 202 for Burnley.
- Frank Casper (born 1944), played 237 games for Burnley and manager.
- Colin Waldron (born 1948), played 308 games Burnley as a defender, .
- Chris Casper (born 1975), footballer who played 75 games; 2 for Manchester United and 39 for Reading, now Academy Manager for Burnley, son of Frank Casper, brought up locally.
- Tom Heaton (born 1986), played 188 games for Burnley and 3 for England as goalkeeper; resided in Mereclough during Burnley's 2014–15 Premier League campaign.

== See also ==
- Listed buildings in Cliviger
