= Wilson Smith =

British physician, virologist and immunologist

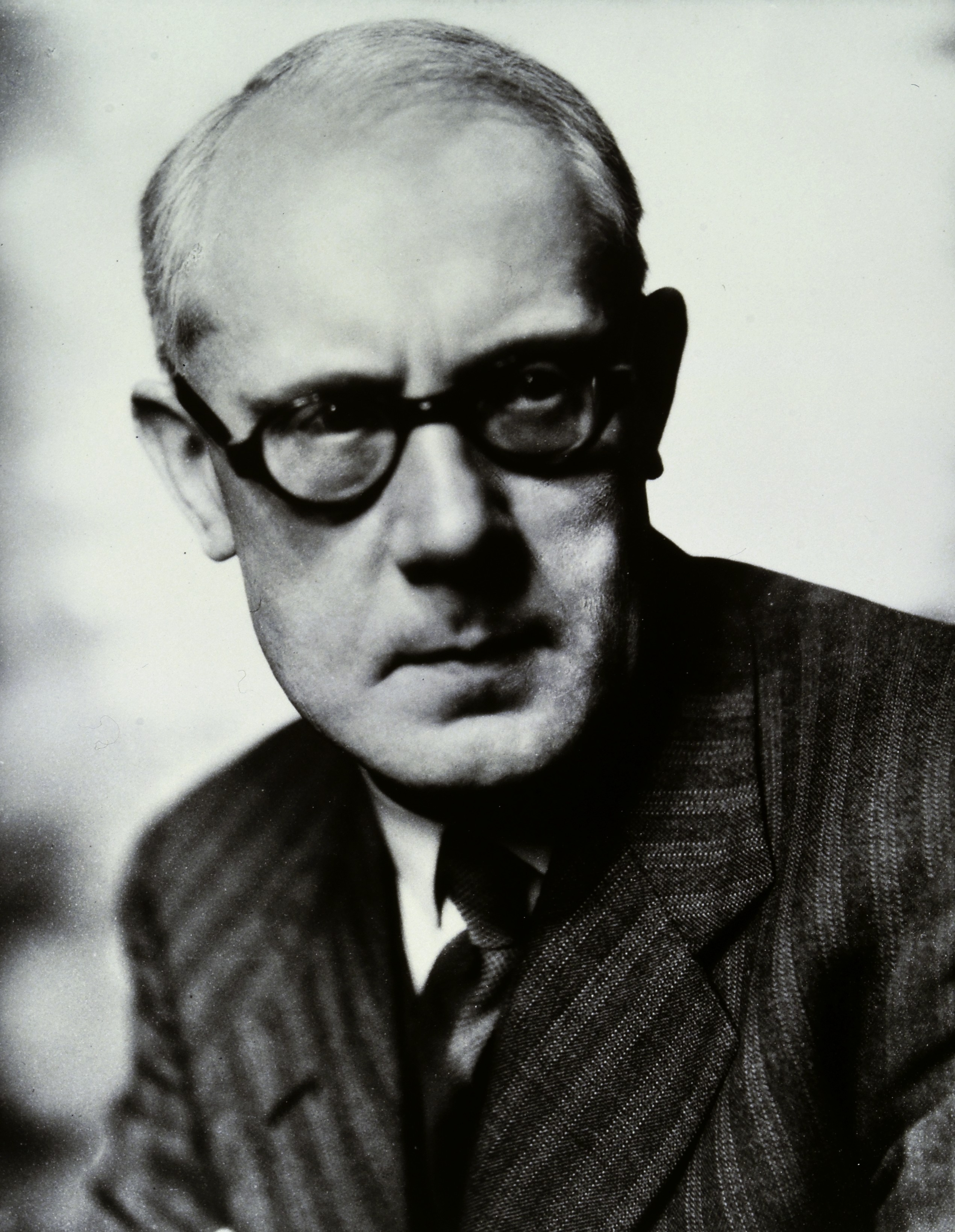
Portrait of Wilson Smith

Wilson Smith FRCP FRS (21 June 1897, Great Harwood at Blackburn; – 10 July 1965, Woolton Hill at Newbury) was a British physician, virologist and immunologist. He was part of the group that first isolated the influenza virus and developed one of the first vaccines against influenza.

When Wilson Smith was ten years old, his father died and his mother took care of the four children alone. During his last year of secondary school at the Accrington Grammar School, he also taught at Great Harwood Elementary School. From 1915 to 1919 he served in France and Belgium as a private in the R.A.M.C.'s 107th Field Ambulance. From 1919 he studied medicine at the University of Manchester with degree qualification as both physician and surgeon (M.B., Ch.B.) in 1923. He was for two years a physician practising clinical medicine in Manchester and worked for one year as a ship's doctor aboard a Blue Funnel Line cargo ship. He then studied bacteriology, graduating with a higher medical degree (M.D.) in 1927. He went into research and led a virus research group at the Medical Research Council in Hampstead in north London. There in 1933 he, in collaboration with Christopher Andrewes and Patrick Laidlaw, succeeded in isolating human influenza A virus and transferring it to ferrets. In 1936 Frank Horsfall, Alice Chenoweth, and colleagues developed, in mouse lung tissue, a live influenza virus vaccine.

That same year, 1936, saw the development of two influenza A vaccines in embryonated eggs, one (live) by Wilson Smith ... and the other (killed, whole virus) by Thomas Francis and Thomas Magill. ... In 1937 Anatol Smorodintsev and colleagues in the Soviet Union reported on the administration of the Wilson Smith strain to humans, using doses that were lethal to mice. ... This vaccine is considered the first live human influenza virus vaccine, and although it would not receive a passing grade by today's standards (20% of vaccinees developed febrile influenza), it absolutely demonstrated the role of the virus in the development of influenza. ...

In 1939 Smith became a professor of bacteriology at the University of Sheffield and in 1946 a professor at the University College Hospital Medical School at the University of London. He retired from the U.C.H. Medical School in 1960 but continued to do research at the Microbiological Research Establishment in Porton Down.

Smith was also instrumental in the introduction of polio vaccination in the UK and headed the Medical Research Council's Biological Research Board.

Smith was elected in 1949 a fellow of the Royal Society in and in 1959 a fellow of the Royal College of Physicians, whose Bose Prize he received in 1959. He was in 1957 the Leeuwenhoek Lecturer of the Royal Society (Virus-Host Cell Relationships) and in 1960 the Royal Society's vice-president. In 1960 he received the Graham Gold Medal from the University of London.

As a hobby, he played his violin in string quartets with friends. He married the bacteriologist Muriel Mary Nutt in 1927. Upon his death he was survived by his widow and their two married daughters.

His brother George was Lecturer in mycology at the London School of Hygiene and Tropical Medicine and his brother Howard was lecturer in theology at the University of Manchester.
