= Mortimer Grimshaw =

English political activist (c. 1826–1869)

- Born: c. 1826; Great Harwood, England
- Died: 22 December 1869 (aged 43); Rishton, England
- Other name: "Thunderer of Lancashire"
- Occupations: Cotton weaver, political activist
- Years active: 1852–1864
- Known for: Joint leader of the 1853–54 Preston strike

Mortimer Grimshaw (c. 1826 – 22 December 1869) was an English political activist, strike leader and cotton weaver. He briefly attained national fame in the 1850s due to his part in the Preston strike of 1853–54. A large man whose face was marked by smallpox, he was renowned for his oratory, which earned him the nickname of the "Thunderer of Lancashire".

The son of a radical public speaker and orator, Grimshaw's early campaigns were centred on the improvement of working conditions for the mill-workers in the village of Royton and enforcement of the Factory Acts. He was an outspoken critic of the Whig Party and an advocate of the Chartist movement, in particular of their anti-Whig alliance with the Tory Party. Strikes among mill-workers began to break out during the early 1850s and Grimshaw was one of the leaders, along with George Cowell, of the strike in Preston in 1853. The strikers were fruitless in their demands for a ten per cent wage increase, and Grimshaw found himself with no further role in the workers' unions. He and his fellow conspirators were charged with conspiring to prevent people working in the mills, although the charges were later dropped.

Following the defeat in Preston, Grimshaw emigrated to the United States, where he became a supporter of the Confederacy. In 1861, he and Cowell attempted to intervene in a strike in Clitheroe but were branded "notorious scoundrels" by the weavers there for their parts in the Preston strike. The following year he joined a small group of Lancashire men who unsuccessfully attempted to rally support for the Confederates in northern England. After a period as a freelance industrial mediator, selling his services to mill owners and working against the unions he had once aligned with, he returned to his job as a power-loom weaver until his death from tuberculosis in 1869. Grimshaw and his activities were the basis for two of the author Charles Dickens' characters.

== Early life and career ==
Grimshaw was born in or around Great Harwood, Lancashire into a working-class family and baptised at Church Kirk in 1826. His father, Thomas, had a reputation as a radical public speaker in the early part of the 19th century. Grimshaw initially worked as a cotton weaver before becoming a full-time activist and agitator. He first came to prominence in the village of Royton, near Oldham, in 1852 as a campaigner for the improvement and enforcement of the Factory Acts, to improve the working conditions of those employed in the cotton mills. In the same year he became editor of the anti-Whig broadsheet, the Royton Vindicator. He criticised the suppression of local political activists and supported the alliance of the Chartist movement with the Tories against the Whigs.

Mill workers in England became increasingly disenchanted with improper practices by factory owners, long working hours and unsatisfactory conditions. During the early 1850s workers throughout the country began to campaign for higher wages and strikes were held in several towns and cities; brickmakers in Manchester struck in January while woollen mill operatives in the West Riding of Yorkshire went on strike two months later. Grimshaw himself was involved in a strike in Stockport, where workers were demanding a ten percent wage increase, in March 1853.

== Preston strike of 1853–1854 ==
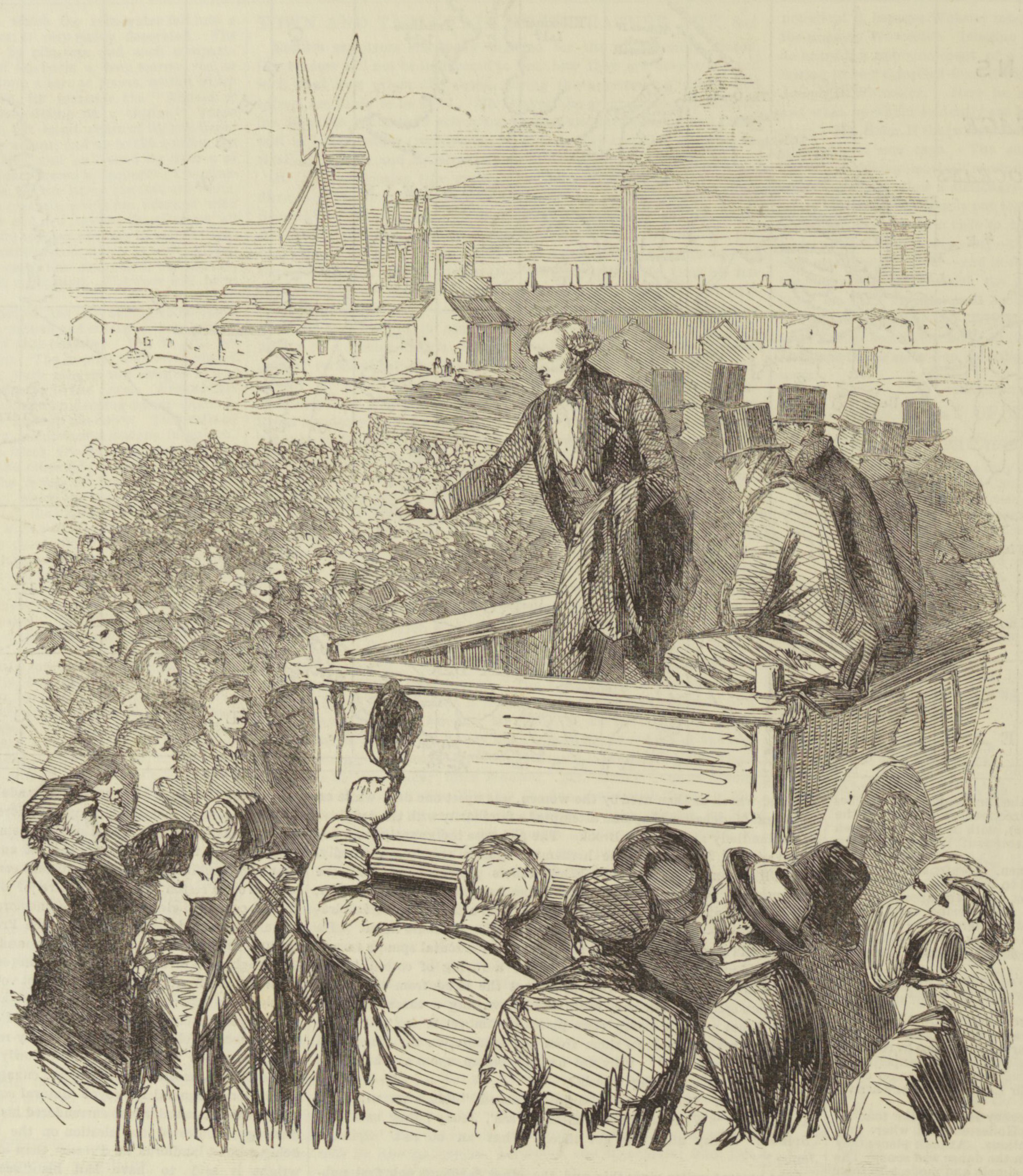
Grimshaw's friend and fellow activist, George Cowell, speaking to the gathered strikers in Preston

When cotton weavers in Preston struck in September of that year, again demanding a wage increase of ten percent, he and fellow activist George Cowell became the most prominent leaders at the mass meetings of the workers. Grimshaw would often wear a white hat at meetings in the style of politicians Henry Hunt and William Cobbett. According to local journalist Charles Hardwick, he was a strong advocate of the liberation of oppressed "factory slaves" but it was noted that his judgement in arguments could often be overpowered by his enthusiasm and emotions. In the seven months that Grimshaw was involved with the Preston strike he travelled throughout Lancashire and Yorkshire, speaking at more than 60 public meetings.

At one meeting in October 1853, he shared the platform with John B. Horsfall and Chartist leader Ernest Jones, whose Labour Parliament Grimshaw was involved in the following year as one of the two delegates from Preston, along with Wallace Beever. The Labour Parliament was partly a response to a lock-out of around 20,000 mill workers by the employers in Preston; its aim was to organise a levy on wages to support operatives who went on strike or were locked out. Those paying the levy were to elect a committee to buy and look after land and factories and the Parliament would meet on a yearly basis. However, the plan did not gain support among all Chartists and the plans never materialised.

The Preston strike ended in defeat for Grimshaw, Cowell and the operatives and as a result there were no suitable jobs for him in the unions; his characteristics would not have lent themselves to a secretarial role. In April 1854, Grimshaw spoke at a meeting in Fulwood advocating for the creation of a new mill town outside Preston, where the factories would be owned by the workers; this idea too was unsuccessful. On 10 August 1854, Grimshaw, Cowell and nine other men were indicted for conspiring to "prevent certain persons working in the mills in [Preston]". Although the charges were dropped by the prosecution, the judge presiding implied he would otherwise have felt compelled to pass down a severe sentence and expressed his hope that none of the 11 would engage in such conspiracy again.

Two years later, Grimshaw and Horsfall raised funds to enable them to emigrate and he subsequently spent some time living in the northern United States. Upon his return to England, Grimshaw, Cowell and two other weavers were involved in a dispute between mill-owners and workers in Clitheroe, Lancashire, in 1861. However, due to their lack of success in Preston the group were branded a "gang of notorious scoundrels" by strike leader John O'Neil and were treated with hostility by the gathered crowds of weavers.

== Later career ==
During his time in America, Grimshaw had developed pro-Confederacy tendencies. In general, there was some support for the Confederacy among people who were affected by the shortage in cotton from America caused by the American Civil War, such as traders and mill-owners. On a personal level, Grimshaw was opposed to the growth of capitalism in the United States and described the notions of American freedom and liberty as "farce and humbug". In 1862 he became part of a small group of working-class Lancashire men, all of whom had been involved in various strikes in the 1850s, assembled by Liverpool-based tin plate merchant James Spence. The group held meetings with the intention of rallying support for the Confederates within northern England, particularly in Lancashire and Cheshire. However, when a vote regarding the support of British mediation in America was taken at one meeting in Blackburn, only 12 out of more than 4,000 workers voted in favour of Grimshaw. The local Weavers' Association consequently declared themselves in favour of Abraham Lincoln and his Union. Ultimately, the group's efforts were handicapped by an inability to maintain activity throughout the duration of the Civil War; by 1864 only two of the original company remained.

By the end of his career, Grimshaw had become a freelance political adventurer, industrial mediator and anti-union agitator selling his services to mill-owners and employers. In an 1864 letter to George Wilson, former president of the Anti-Corn Law League during the 1840s, he described himself as "destitute and pennyless [sic]" and begged the Lancashire and Yorkshire Railway chairman for money or employment. This was the last public record of Grimshaw; he returned to work as a power-loom weaver until his death in Rishton from the lung disease tuberculosis on 22 December 1869. He is buried at St Bartholomew's Church in Great Harwood.

== Legacy ==
Two of Charles Dickens' characters were based on Grimshaw. Dickens travelled to Preston in January 1854 to gather information about the strikes for a piece in his weekly magazine Household Words. He attended two meetings where union delegates from nearby towns presented money they had raised in support of the striking Preston workers. In the resulting article On Strike, Dickens describes the general good order of the meetings, which was only disturbed by Grimshaw's oratory; in the article he is given the alias "Gruffshaw".

Later in 1854, Dickens used Grimshaw as his inspiration for Slackbridge, the "unscrupulous demagogue" from the novel Hard Times. Like Grimshaw, Slackbridge is a vocal advocate for better conditions for factory workers in the fictional Coketown; in the story, however, the campaign is successful and the workers unionise rather than going on strike. In his Reader's Guide to Charles Dickens, critic Philip Hobsbaum considers Slackbridge to be a somewhat exaggerated, more sentimental and inflammatory, caricature of Grimshaw.
