= Listed buildings in Cliviger =

Cliviger is a civil parish in the borough of Burnley, Lancashire, England. The parish contains 22 listed buildings that are recorded in the National Heritage List for England. Of these, two are listed at Grade II*, the middle grade, and the others are at Grade II, the lowest grade. Apart from small settlements, the parish is rural, and most of the listed buildings are or have been farmhouses, farm buildings, and associated structures. Also in the parish are large houses, a parish church, the base of a cross, a public house, two war memorials, and two boundary stones.

== Key ==
Grade	Criteria
II*	Particularly important buildings of more than special interest
II	Buildings of national importance and special interest

== Buildings ==
Name and location	Photograph	Date	Notes	Grade
Stump Cross; 53.76645°N 2.18637°W		Late medieval (probable)	A roughly-hewn upright stone, one of five marking the line of the Long Causeway. The word "STUMP" is inscribed on the front face.	II
Barcroft Hall; 53.76998°N 2.20528°W		Late 16th century	A former country house, later altered. It is in sandstone with stone-slate roofs, and has an E-shaped plan consisting of a hall with cross-wings. The house is on a sloping site, and is in two and three storeys. The windows are mullioned and/or transomed. In the forecourt wall is semicircular arched gateway with a crow-stepped parapet and a datestone. The garden wall and the gateway are included in the listing.	II*
The Holme, Holme Chapel; 53.75159°N 2.18625°W		1603	Originally a country house, altered in 1717, 1796 and 1854, and later used as an old people's home, but then gutted by fire. It is in sandstone and had a stone-slate roof. The house has a modified H-plan, with a hall range flanked by gabled wings, and is in two storeys. On the front is a gabled porch. The windows are mullioned.	II*
Old farmhouse and outbuilding, Dyneley Farm; 53.75968°N 2.21473°W	—	Early 17th century	The former farmhouse and outbuilding are in sandstone with stone-slate roofs. The farmhouse has two storeys and two bays. Most of the windows are mullioned. The outbuilding is attached to the farmhouse and projects at right angles.	II
Higher Red Lees Farmhouse; 53.77783°N 2.19462°W	—	1631	A sandstone farmhouse with a stone-slate roof in two storeys with a complex plan in two overlapping ranges. Most of the windows are mullioned. Inside the farmhouse is a large bressumer.	II
Stiperden House Farmhouse; 53.74768°N 2.13947°W		1658	A farmhouse with a barn attached on the left side and a stable on the right side. They are in sandstone with a stone-slate roof. The house has two storeys and two bays. On the front is a single-storey gabled porch and an inscribed datestone. The windows vary; some are mullioned, others have been replaced.	II
Bulls Head Farmhouse; 53.76090°N 2.19850°W		Late 17th century (probable)	A sandstone farmhouse with a stone-slate roof, in two storeys and two bays. It has a plain doorway, and the windows have been altered. Inside the farmhouse is a timber-framed partition.	II
Law House; 53.76757°N 2.19539°W	—	Late 17th century (possible)	The farmhouse, altered in the 18th and 19th centuries, is in sandstone with a stone-slate roof. It has two storeys, and is in two unequal bays with a large outshut at the rear. Some of the windows date from the 19th century, but there are also mullioned windows, some containing sashes.	II
Berrils Green Farmhouse; 53.74987°N 2.18475°W	—	Mid 18th century (probable)	The former farmhouse is in sandstone with a stone-slate roof, with two storeys and two bays. The central doorway has a moulded surround, and a small canopy. There are two mullioned windows in each floor.	II
Far Side Farmhouse and barn 53.77040°N 2.19736°W	—	18th century	An integrated farmhouse and barn with some 17th-century features, in sandstone with a stone-slate roof. It has a long rectangular plan with the farmhouse at the south; this has two storeys and is in two bays with a single-storey extension at the rear. Some of the windows are mullioned. The barn continues the range to the north.	II
Mounting block, Foxstone Farm; 53.77541°N 2.18448°W	—	18th century (probable)	The mounting block is in sandstone, and consists of six moulded steps on a base.	II
Well, Foxstone Farm; 53.77551°N 2.18459°W	—	18th century (probable)	The well is in the courtyard of the farm. It is covered by a square sandstone slab carrying a tapering pedestal surmounted by a ball finial.	II
Workshop and Rose Cottage, Foxstone Farm; 53.77543°N 2.18436°W	—	18th century	The combined workshop and cottage are in sandstone with a stone-slate roof, and form a long rectangular block. The workshop faces the courtyard, is in two storeys, and contains garage doors, a plain door and mullioned windows. The rear is a dwelling and has been altered.	II
Fir Trees, Foxstone Farmhouse and Cottage; 53.77563°N 2.18462°W		18th century	Originally a farmhouse, later divided into three dwellings, and possibly a reordering of a 17th-century building. It is in sandstone with stone-slate roofs, with two storeys, and has a central range and two receding gabled wings. On the front is a round-headed doorway that has a moulded architrave with imposts, a triple keystone, and a fanlight containing Y-tracery. Most of the windows are mullioned, and there are some sash windows.	II
Ram Inn, Holme Chapel; 53.75304°N 2.19050°W		Late 18th century	An inn and an attached house in sandstone with a stone-slate roof. The building has a long rectangular plan, and is in two storeys. The windows are mullioned, and in front of the centre of the building is a four-step mounting block that is included in the listing.	II
St John's Church, Holme Chapel; 53.75294°N 2.18900°W		1788–94	The church is in simple Classical style, and a chancel and vestry were added in 1897. It is in sandstone and has a rectangular plan. At the west end is a doorway with a pedimented Tuscan architrave, above which is a blind arch containing a lunette. There are round-headed windows in two storeys, a round window in the pediment, and a bellcote with an octagonal cupola.	II
Ice house, former Ormerod House; 53.77979°N 2.19070°W	—	Early 19th century	The sandstone ice house is built into a steep slope. It has a plain doorway leading into an L-shaped vaulted passage. At the end of this is a semicircular-arched doorway and a large egg-shaped vessel.	II
395 and 397 Burnley Road, Holme Chapel; 53.75321°N 2.19078°W		Mid 19th century	A pair of sandstone houses with stone-slate roofs in Jacobean style. They have a square plan, with three bays on each front, and are in two storeys with a basement and an attic. In the centre of the entrance front is a gabled double porch with a central pier, and at the top of the house is a central gablet. The windows are mullioned. At the front of the houses is a wall with railings, and a gates with piers that are included in the listing.	II
Boundary stone 53.73496°N 2.15698°W		Late 19th century	The boundary stone is arched and has a flat face. This is divided vertically into two parts, the left side inscribed "BOROUGH OF TODMORDEN", and the right side "CLIVIGER RURAL DISTRICT".	II
County boundary stone 53.73493°N 2.15676°W		Late 19th century	The boundary stone is arched and has a flat face. This is divided vertically into two parts, the left side inscribed "YORKSHIRE", and the right side "LANCASHIRE".	II
Cliviger War Memorial; 53.75311°N 2.19018°W		1922	The war memorial is in an enclosed garden adjacent to the west end of the churchyard of St John's Church, Holme Chapel. It is in granite, and consists of a rough-hewn Latin cross with a tapering shaft on a plinth, a square base, and a concrete platform. The plinth has an inscription and the names of those lost in the First World War, and on the base are inscriptions and the names of those lost in the Second World War.	II
Weir and District War Memorial; 53.73660°N 2.20975°W		1935	The war memorial was built to replace an existing memorial built into the wall of a shop, and it stands on an elevated site above the A671 road. It is in granite and consists of a cross on a tapering shaft about 3 metres (9.8 ft) high. This stands on a square plinth on a two-stepped base, in an octagonal terraced enclosure enclosed by stone walls. There are inscriptions on the horizontal arms of the cross, and on the base of the shaft.	II
