= Martholme =

Grade I listed English country house in Lancashire, England

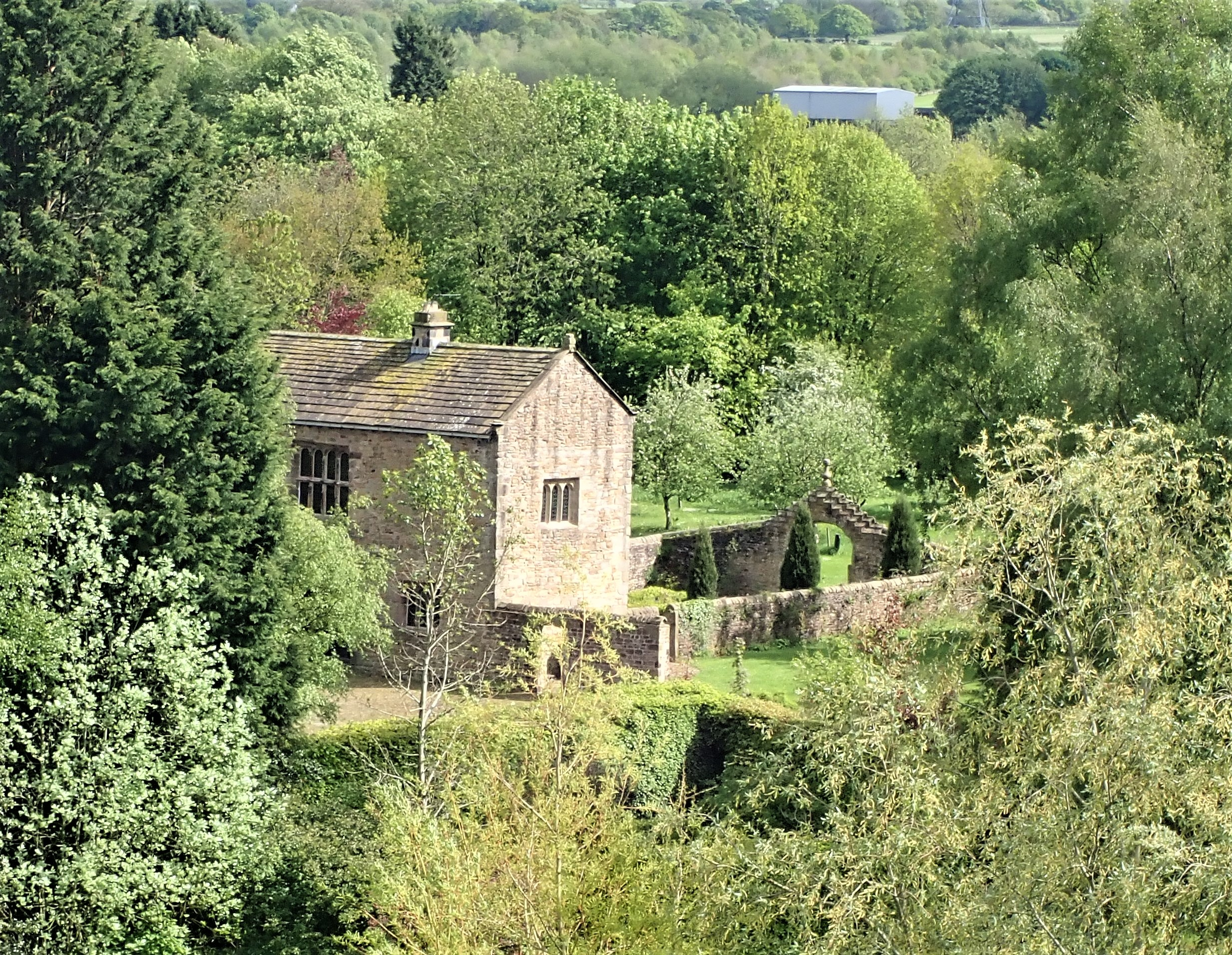
- The gatehouse and outer archway, the main building is not visible from the public highway

- Location within the Borough of Hyndburn
- 53.8000°N 2.3768°W
- Location: Great Harwood, Lancashire

Listed Building – Grade I
- Official name: Martholme
- Designated: 11 July 1966
- Reference no.: 1205981

Listed Building – Grade II*
- Official name: Gatehouse at Martholme
- Designated: 11 July 1966
- Reference no.: 1072735

Listed Building – Grade II*
- Official name: Outer archway at Martholme
- Designated: 11 July 1966
- Reference no.: 1280458

Martholme is a Grade I listed medieval manor house standing on the banks of the River Calder 1 1/4 miles (2 km) from Great Harwood, Lancashire, England and 5 miles (8 km) north-east of Blackburn.

== History ==
In the 13th century, the house belonged to the de Fitton family. It was passed through marriage to the Hesketh family. Parts of the current building date from Medieval times. Additions and alterations took place in 1561, when the gatehouse was rebuilt and 1607.

The house was rebuilt in 1577 by Thomas Hesketh (d. 1588), High Sheriff of Lancashire for 1563. He added an east wing and a gatehouse. Later work was carried out during the time of his son Robert Hesketh (d. 1620), High Sheriff in 1599 and MP for Lancashire in 1597, who added a second arched gateway. After his death his last wife Jane married Sir Richard de Hoghton and left Martholme to be leased out to tenant farmers. With the death of Jane ownership passed to her son Thomas but the Heskeths never reoccupied the house itself.

After the Civil War the Hesketh family, as Catholics, were heavily fined, losing much of their land at Great Harwood. As a result, Martholme was neglected. It is now a private residence but much of the house has been demolished. It has been designated a Grade I listed building by English Heritage.

== Architecture ==
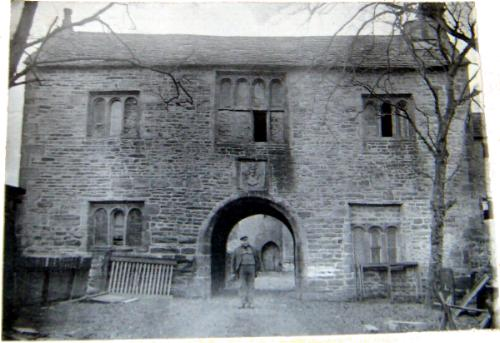
Martholme gatehouse, built 1561

Martholme is constructed, to a T-shaped floor plan, of sandstone rubble, now rendered, with a slate roof. It was originally surrounded by a moat, of which there are still traces.

The 16th-century gatehouse is about 75 feet (23 m) south of the house. It too is built of sandstone, with slate roofs. It is rectangular and measures approximately 43 feet 9 inches (13.34 m) by 20 feet (6.1 m). The entrance is a round stone archway. The building has three bays and is on two storeys.

English Heritage designated the house a Grade I listed building on 11 July 1966. The Grade I designation—the highest of the three grades—is for buildings "of exceptional interest, sometimes considered to be internationally important". The gatehouse has received a separate Grade II* designation.

== See also ==
- Grade I listed buildings in Lancashire
- Listed buildings in Great Harwood
