= Jerry Dawson (footballer, born 1888) =

English footballer

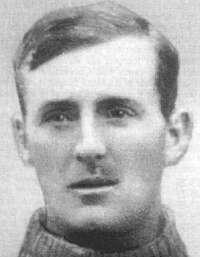

Personal information
- Full name: Jeremiah Dawson
- Date of birth: 18 March 1888
- Place of birth: Cliviger, Burnley, England
- Date of death: 8 August 1970 (aged 82)
- Place of death: Cliviger, England
- Height: 5 ft 10 1/2 in (1.79 m)
- Position: Goalkeeper

Senior career*
Years	Team	Apps	(Gls)
1907–1928	Burnley	522	(0)

International career
1921–1922	England	2	(0)
- * Club domestic league appearances and goals

Jeremiah Dawson (18 March 1888 – 8 August 1970) was an English professional football goalkeeper. Dawson is most notable for holding the record of having played the most ever league games for Burnley.

== Playing career ==
Dawson was born in Cliviger, Burnley, Lancashire and signed his first professional contract with Burnley in February 1907 after coming to their attention playing for Portsmouth Rovers. He was formerly employed by the nearby mine.

Dawson is mostly remembered for one match, the 1914 FA Cup Final, even though he did not play in it. The day before the game, he told manager John Haworth that he didn't think he would make it to the end of the game. As there were no substitutes in those days, that would have left Burnley without a goalkeeper. Burnley went on to win the FA Cup and, as a sign of respect for his unselfishness, Dawson was given a winner's medal along with the rest of the team.

In his time at Burnley, Dawson played well over 700 first team games as a keeper.

Dawson also played twice for the England national football team, making his debut on 22 October 1921 in the 1–1 draw with Ireland.

== Non-playing career ==
After retiring from professional football he joined the coaching staff at Turf Moor, and played as a batsman in the Lancashire League for Burnley Cricket Club. His nephew Arthur Dawson was also a professional football player for Burnley and Nelson.

== Death ==
Still living in Cliviger, Dawson died, aged 82, on 8 August 1970.
