= Blackburn (ancient parish) =

Coordinates: 53.749°N 2.485°W

Blackburn was a large parish in Lancashire, England. The parish had numerous townships and chapelries, which were administered separately from the core Blackburn area, and became recognised as separate civil parishes in 1866. The parish formed part of the Blackburn hundred.

The other parishes were:

- Balderstone
- Billington
- Clayton-le-Dale
- Cuerdale
- Dinckley
- Eccleshill
- Great Harwood
- Little Harwood
- Livesey
- Lower Darwen
- Mellor
- Osbaldeston
- Over Darwen
- Pleasington
- Ramsgreave
- Rishton
- Salesbury
- Samlesbury
- Tockholes
- Walton-le-Dale
- Wilpshire
- Witton
