= John Mercer (scientist) =

English chemist and fabric printer (1791–1866)

John Mercer JP
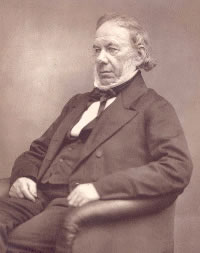
- Born: 21 February 1791; Great Harwood, Lancashire, England
- Died: 30 November 1866 (aged 75); Great Harwood, Lancashire, England
- Occupations: Dye and Fabric Chemist; Fabric Printer
- Spouse: Mary Wolstenholme (m. 1814)
- Children: 6

John Mercer JP (21 February 1791 – 30 November 1866) was an English dye and fabric chemist and fabric printer born in Great Harwood, Lancashire. In 1844 he developed a process for treating cotton, mercerisation, that improves many of its qualities for use in fabrics.

== Biography ==
John Mercer never went to school; he learned basic reading and writing from his neighbour. He was very fond of dyeing and experimented to find new methods. With the help of a textbook he taught himself the chemistry of dyes. In 1817, he discovered Antimony orange, the first good orange pigment available for cotton-fabric printing. He developed the mercerisation process in 1844, and was admitted to the Royal Society, the Philosophical Society and the Chemical Society. He was elected to membership of the Manchester Literary and Philosophical Society on 17 April 1849.

Mercer pioneered research into antimicrobials, preventing the spread of cholera in Sykeside(now part of Haslingden) in 1847 with chloride of lime, or "calcium hypochlorite", which is today used to disinfect public swimming pools and drinking water.

He was an exhibitor and juror to the Great Exhibition in 1851, and was one of only two participants that Queen Victoria exchanged gifts with. He was a juror at the second Great Exhibition in 1862 as well. He also became a justice of the peace in Lancashire, and continued to give lectures at Clayton-le-Moors and supporting local Anglican and Methodist churches.

In 1814, he married Mary Wolstenholme; together they had six children. His wife died in 1859.

The 1861 census records him as a 70-year-old "Chymist", living with his son John and 12 others at 29 Burlington Hotel, London (Florence Nightingale was next door, at No. 30). Mercer died at home on 30 November 1866, aged 75, and was buried in St Bartholomew's Church, Great Harwood. Funds for his commemoration were provided by his daughter Maria, and a clock tower was unveiled in Great Harwood in 1903, as well as the Mercer Hall. Mercer's cottage at Oakenshaw, Clayton-le-Moors was donated to be a museum and park.
