= Holme Hall, Cliviger =

Listed building in Lancashire, England

The Holme
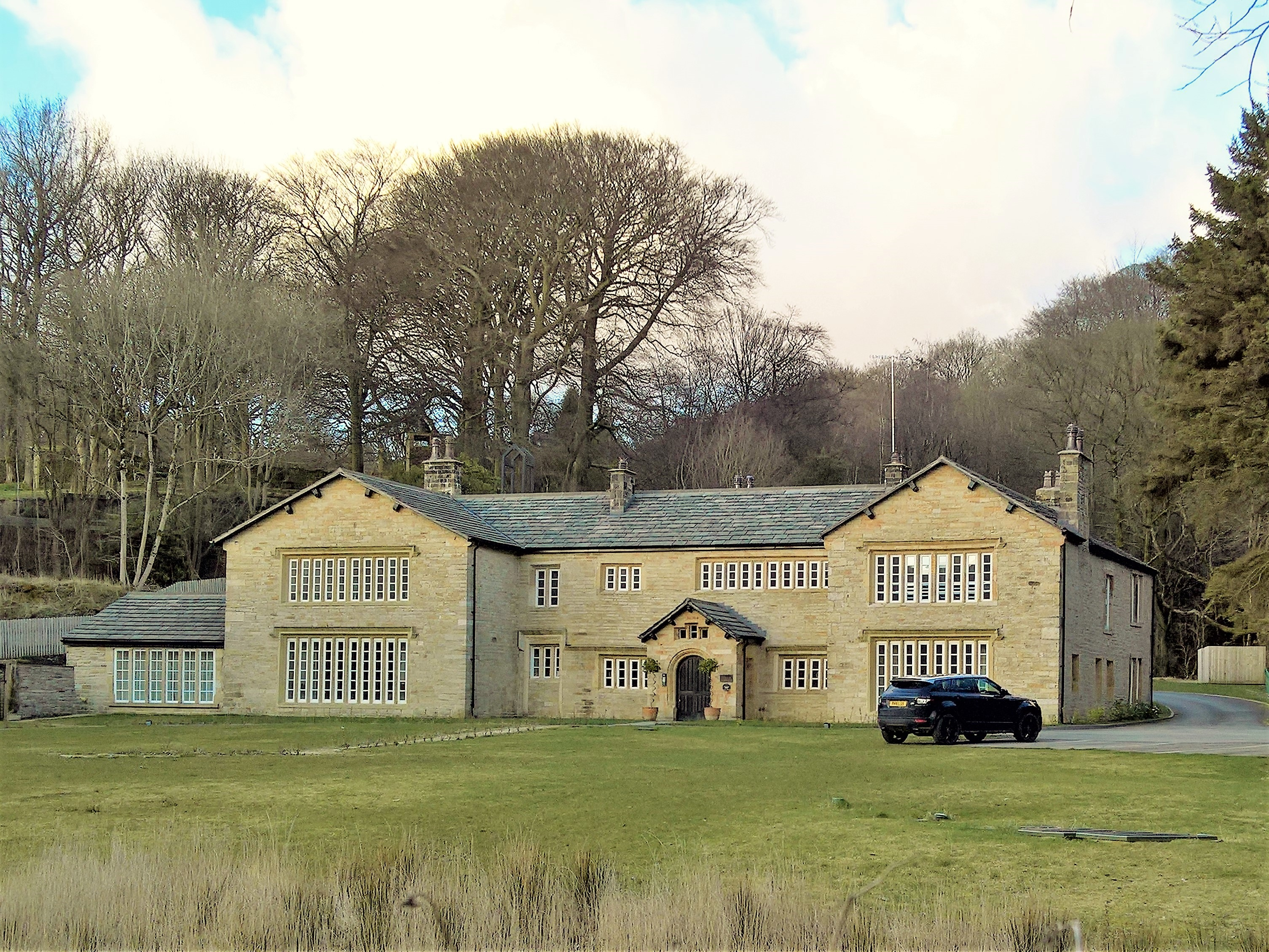

- Location within the Borough of Burnley
- Alternative names: Holme Hall

General information
- Type: Manor house
- Location: Cliviger, Burnley, Lancashire, England
- Coordinates: 53°45′6″N 2°11′10″W
- Construction started: 1603
- Completed: 1717
- Renovated: 2016
- Destroyed: 2003

Technical details
- Material: Coursed squared sandstone, mostly watershot, stone slate roof

Listed Building – Grade II*
- Official name: The Holme
- Designated: 1 April 1953
- Reference no.: 1362053

Holme Hall (or The Holme) is a Grade II* listed manor house in Cliviger near Burnley, in Lancashire, England. The house dates back to at least the 15th century, was rebuilt in the 17th century, and extended in 1854. Between 1985 and 2003 it was used as a retirement home. The structure was devastated by suspected arson attacks in 2003 and remained derelict for more than a decade before being redeveloped into apartments in 2016.

== History ==
The land that sites Holme Hall dates back to 1340, when Richard de Whitacre arrived in Cliviger from High Whiteacre (Padiham). In 1431 The Holme, then a manor house of 40 rooms, was referenced in connection with Thomas Whitaker. The process of converting the original wooden structure into stone began in 1603 and was completed in 1717, with the west wing. The Whitakers installed windows in the stairway that had been removed from the old St Mary's Church, Blackburn, after the church was demolished in 1819, and built an extension to the rear in 1854. The family sold the house in 1950. The land once belonged to the Tattersall family and housed a chapel which lent its name to the neighbouring village of Holme Chapel.

In 1953 the house was recognised as a Grade II* listed building with Historic England. The original features were documented, as well as the history of the alterations, including the rear extension in 1854.

In 1985 The Holme became a retirement home which closed in 2003. It was subject to suspected arson attacks in March and April 2003 which devastated most of the south-east structure and destroyed period features, leaving the west wing and 1854 northeast addition intact. The property was sold on 19 August 2004 for £475,000 and again sold on 11 March 2005 for £495,000 to the Hurstwood Group. On 29 August 2007, Hurstwood obtained planning permission to convert the building into ten 1,000-square-foot (93 m^{2}) apartments. On 6 September 2007, Hurstwood sold the property with 1.5 acres (0.61 ha) at auction for £600,000. On 25 April 2013, the derelict property with 1.5 acres was auctioned on behalf of the Receivers with a guide price of £100,000 to £150,000 and sold for £151,000. By this time the planning application had lapsed.

On the 30 November 2014 edition of BBC One's Antiques Roadshow, two yew dining chairs from The Holme, dated to about 1700 and carved with the Whitaker family crest and coat of arms, were featured. Originally part of a set of 18, they were described as "rare" and "the best of their type", and were valued at between £2,000 and £4,000.

== Media gallery ==
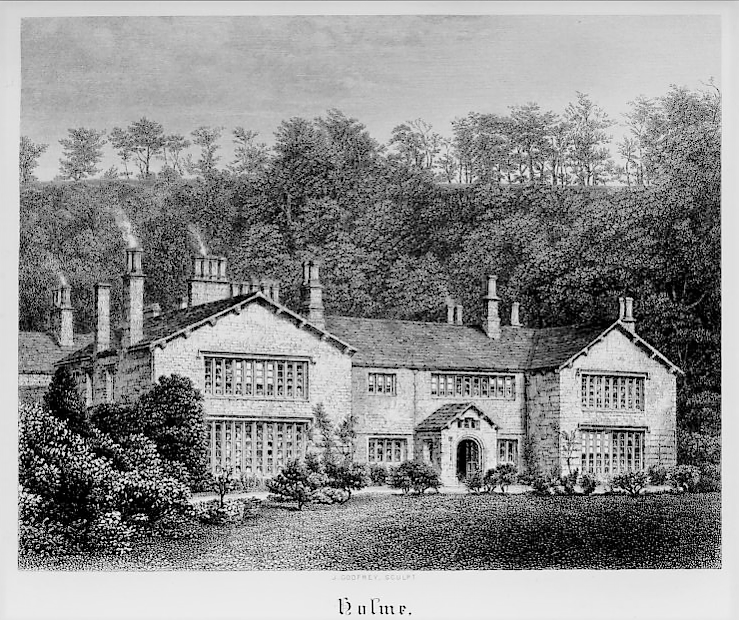
Engraving made c. 1874

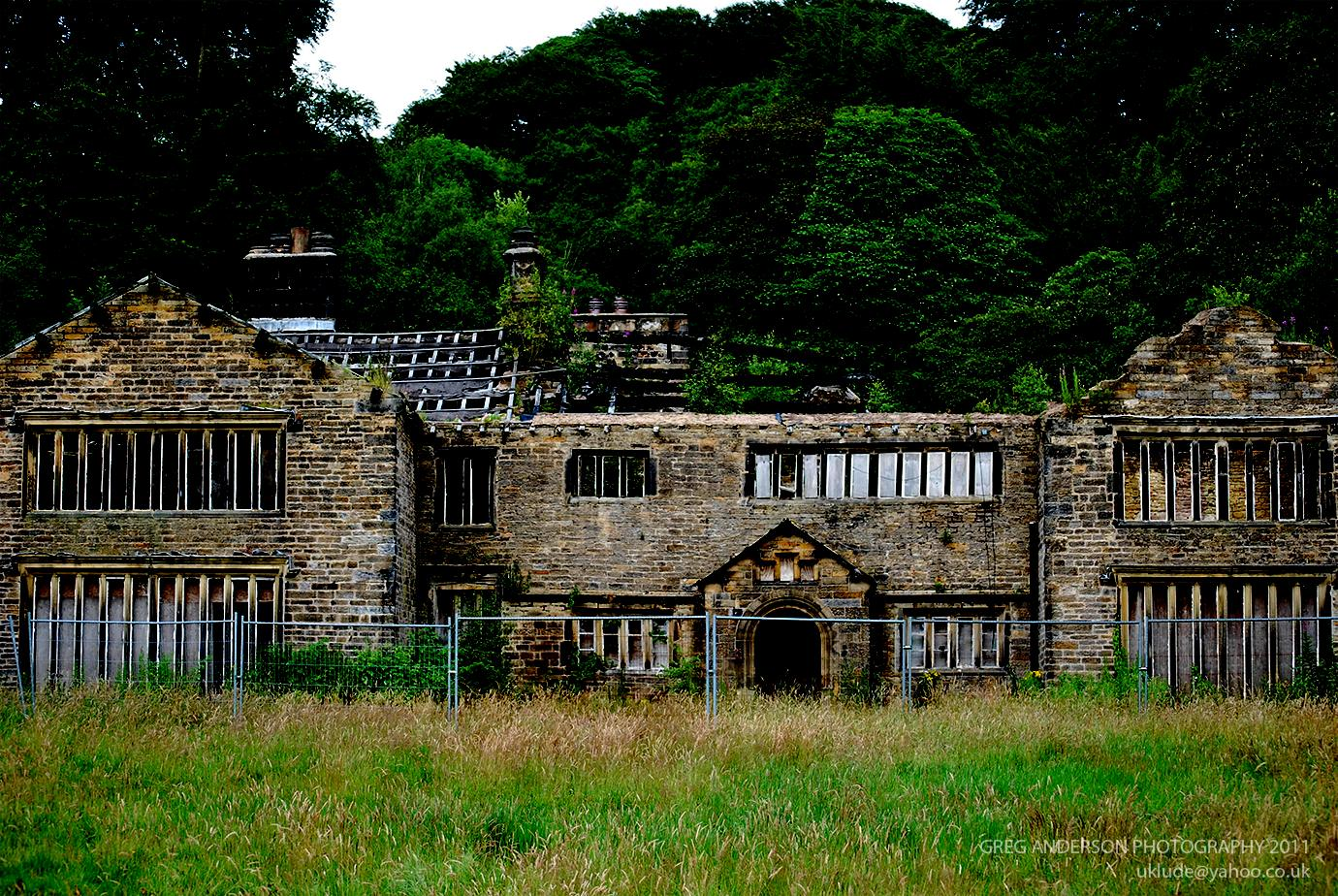
After the fire

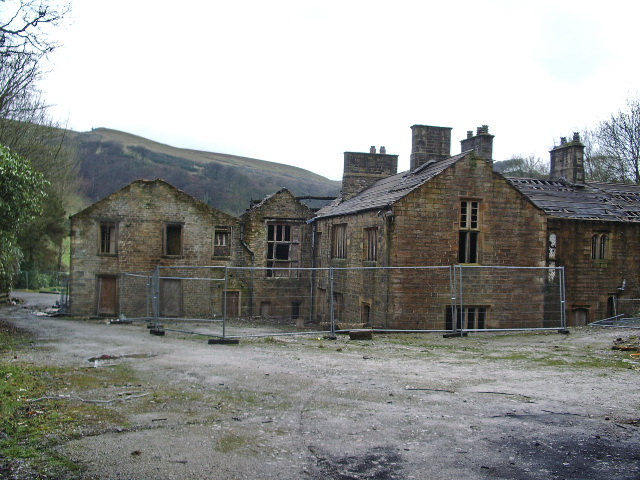
Rear view

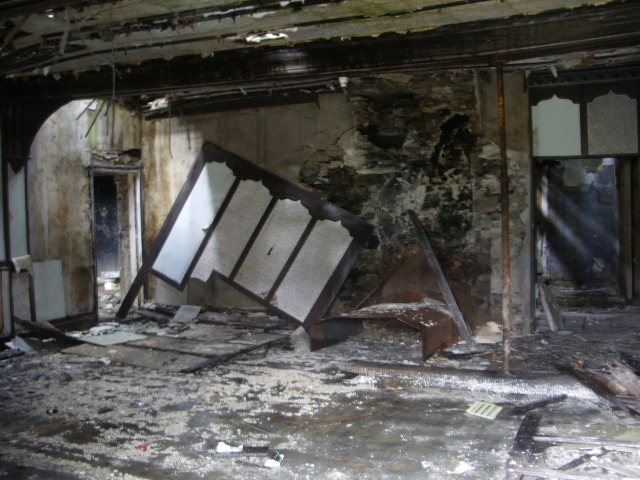
Interior

== See also ==
- Grade II* listed buildings in Lancashire
- Listed buildings in Cliviger
- Thomas Dunham Whitaker
- William Whitaker
