= Lonk =

British breed of sheep

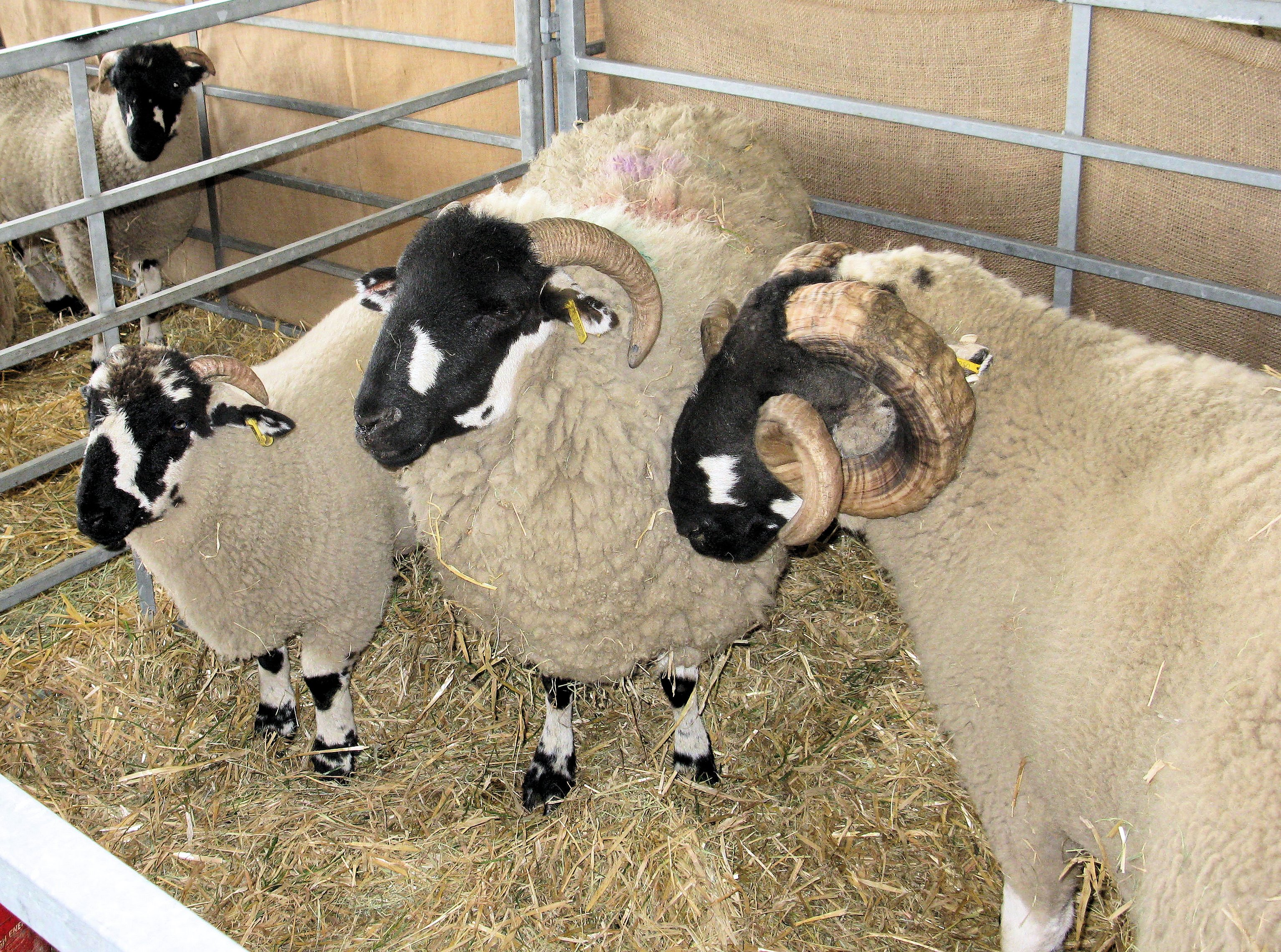
- Ram, ewe and lamb
- Conservation status: FAO (2007): not at risk; DAD-IS (2021): endangered; RBST (2021): at risk
- Other names: Improved Haslingden
- Country of origin: United Kingdom
- Distribution: Lancashire; Yorkshire

Traits
- Weight: Male: average 79 kg; Female: average 54 kg
- Height: Male: average 77 cm; Female: average 66 cm
- Wool colour: white
- Face colour: black or mottled
- Horn status: horned in both sexes

Lonk Ram, photograph by Frank Babbage from the Encyclopaedia Britannica, 1911

The Lonk is a British breed of domestic sheep. It belongs to the group of black-faced hill breeds of northern England, and is found in the hills and forests of the central and southern Pennines of Lancashire and Yorkshire. It is documented from the mid-eighteenth century; a flock book was started in 1905.

== History ==
The Lonk has been reared on the fells of Lancashire and Yorkshire for several hundred years; a herd with records going back to 1740 is still in existence. It is particularly associated with the area around Haslingden, and is also known as the Improved Haslingden. The origin of the word 'Lonk' is unknown; it may derive from the Middle English: wlonk, Old English: wlanc, with meanings including 'proud' and 'bold'; it may be a word for the coarse grazing of its area of origin; or it may derive from 'lanky'.

A breed society, the Lonk Sheep Breeders' Association, was established in 1905, and a flock book was begun in the same year.

Like other traditional breeds, the Lonk was threatened by the mass slaughter of flocks during the 2001 United Kingdom foot-and-mouth outbreak; some genetic material was placed in storage.

In 1999 the total breed population was reported to DAD-IS at 3645 head. In 2003 a survey found that there might be close to 40 000 head of unregistered stock, but by 2012 this figure had fallen to 20 000. In 2021 the breed was listed by the FAO as "not at risk"; in 2021 it was reported to DAD-IS as "endangered", and was listed on the watchlist of the Rare Breeds Survival Trust as "at risk".

== Characteristics ==
The Lonk is of medium size, though larger than most upland breeds. The face and legs are clear of wool; the legs are mottled black-and-white, the face may be mottled or black; the fleece is white. Both sexes are horned. It is strong-boned, agile, long-lived and hardy, and is well adapted to the environment of its area of origin and to the poor grazing of the fells. It can be kept year-round on upland pasture.

== Use ==
Like most other British sheep, the Lonk is reared for its meat and for its wool. Lambs can reach a killing weight of approximately 36 kg on moorland pasture alone.

Ewe fleeces weigh about 3 kg; the wool is rather less coarse than that of many other moorland breeds, with a Bradford count of 44s–56s. It is almost entirely free of kemp.

Ewes kept in lowland conditions may be mated to terminal sire rams, producing fast-growing hybrid lambs that may be ready for slaughter in twelve weeks.
