= Great Harwood =

Town in Lancashire, England

Coordinates: 53.786°N 2.408°W

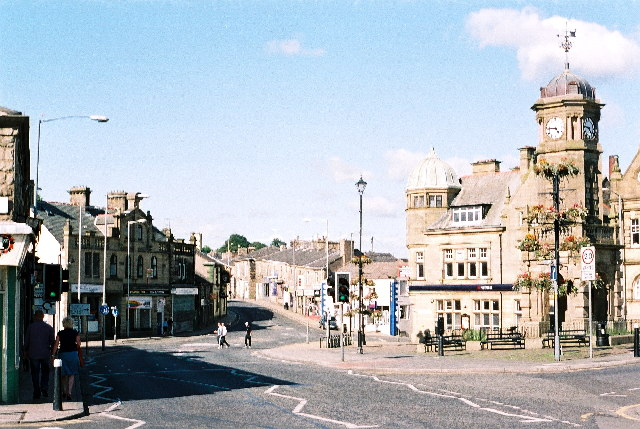
- Town Hall Square with clock tower and the Town Hall just visible behind (on the right of the picture)

- Shown within Hyndburn Location within Lancashire
- Area: 0.87 sq mi (2.3 km^{2})
- Population: 10,800 (2011)
  - Density: 12,414/sq mi (4,793/km^{2})
- OS grid reference: SD737318
- District: Hyndburn
- Shire county: Lancashire
- Region: North West
- Country: England
- Sovereign state: United Kingdom
- Post town: BLACKBURN
- Postcode district: BB6
- Dialling code: 01254
- Police: Lancashire
- Fire: Lancashire
- Ambulance: North West
- UK Parliament: Hyndburn

Great Harwood is a town in the Hyndburn district of Lancashire, England, located 5 miles (8.0 km) north east of Blackburn and adjacent to the Ribble Valley. Great Harwood is part of the "Three Towns" conurbation along with the towns of Clayton-le-Moors and Rishton. In 2001, the town had a population of 11,220, which decreased to 10,800 at the census of 2011.

== History ==
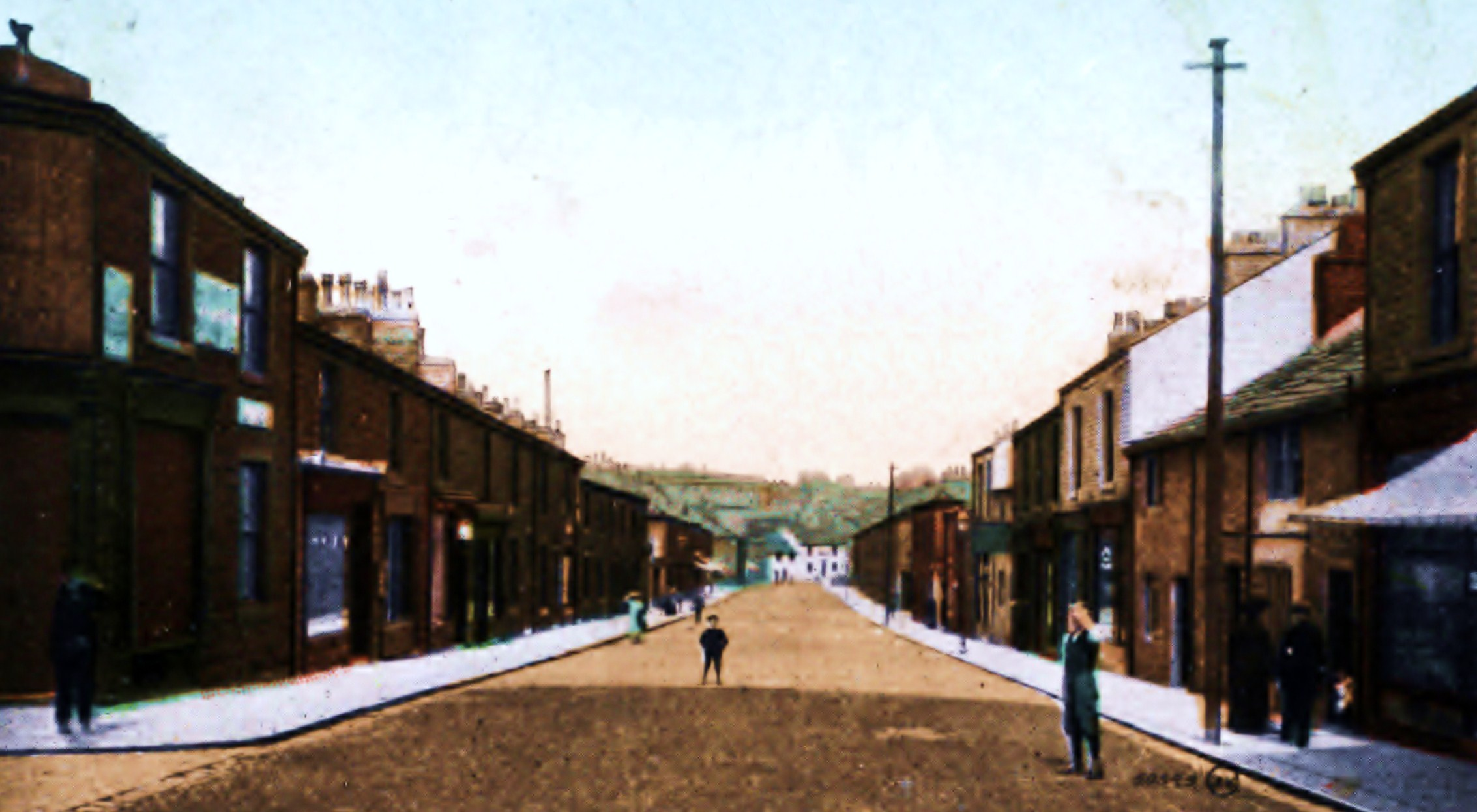
View of Blackburn Road, Great Harwood, circa 1910

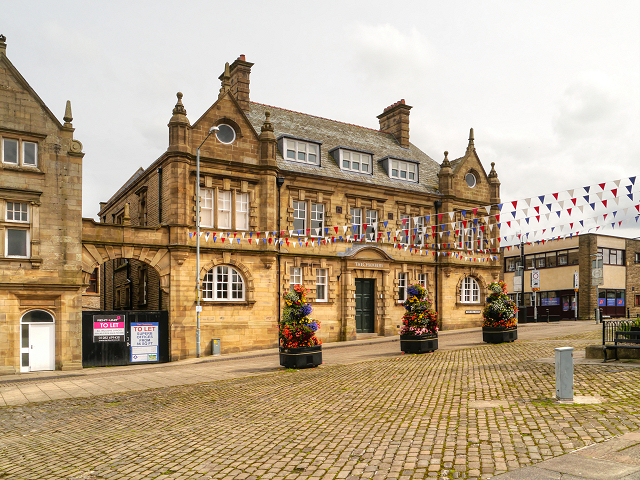
Great Harwood Town Hall, completed in 1900

Great Harwood is a town with an industrial heritage. The Mercer Hall Leisure Centre in Queen Street, and the town clock, pay tribute to John Mercer (1791–1866), the 'father' of Great Harwood, who revolutionised the cotton dyeing process with his invention of mercerisation. The cotton industry became the main source of employment in the town, and by 1920, the Great Harwood Weavers' Association had more than 5,000 members.

The town was once on the railway line from Blackburn to Burnley via Padiham – The North Lancs or Great Harwood Loop of the Lancashire and Yorkshire Railway. The last passenger train ran in November 1957 and goods traffic in 1964. The Martholme Viaduct on the line remains about one mile north east.

Public transport links were further curtailed in 2016, when the direct bus link to Manchester was axed by Harrogate based Transdev.

Great Harwood used to have a lively and bustling market around the town clock in the main square.

Great Harwood has three supermarkets: Aldi, which opened in November 2010, Tesco, which opened in December 2011, and Morrisons, which was previously Co-Op, which originally opened in June 2001, which also opened in 2010. There are two petrol stations, run by Texaco, as well as Morrisons.

A retained fire station is also located in the town, having opened in 1972.

== Sports ==
In 1726 it was reported:

On Wednesday the 23d Instant; a moft obstinate and hard Match at football was played near Great Harwood in this County, between 7 men of the Village of Ranfe (sic), and the like Number of Great Harwood; which last had challenged the whole Kingdom to match them. The Contest was so great between them, that one of the Harwood's Champions dropp'd down dead on the Spot, whose brother being engaged on the same side, would not leave off till the Decision of the Game, which ended in favour of their antagonists the Ranfe Men.

The town football team, Great Harwood Town, closed in July 2006. Great Harwood Cricket Club, was a member of the Ribblesdale Cricket League, winning the senior division in 2008, and has seven teams, ranging from under-9s through to senior level. In 2016, the club accepted an invitation from the Lancashire League, and played in that league from the season of 2017.

In 1954, and again in 1957, the Great Harwood team won the Roller Hockey National Cup.

== Events ==
Great Harwood is also home to the Great Harwood Agricultural Show, an annual show, established in 1857 and held on Spring Bank Holiday Monday. It moved to its present site at the junction of Harwood Lane and Whalley Road in 2009.

== Notable people ==
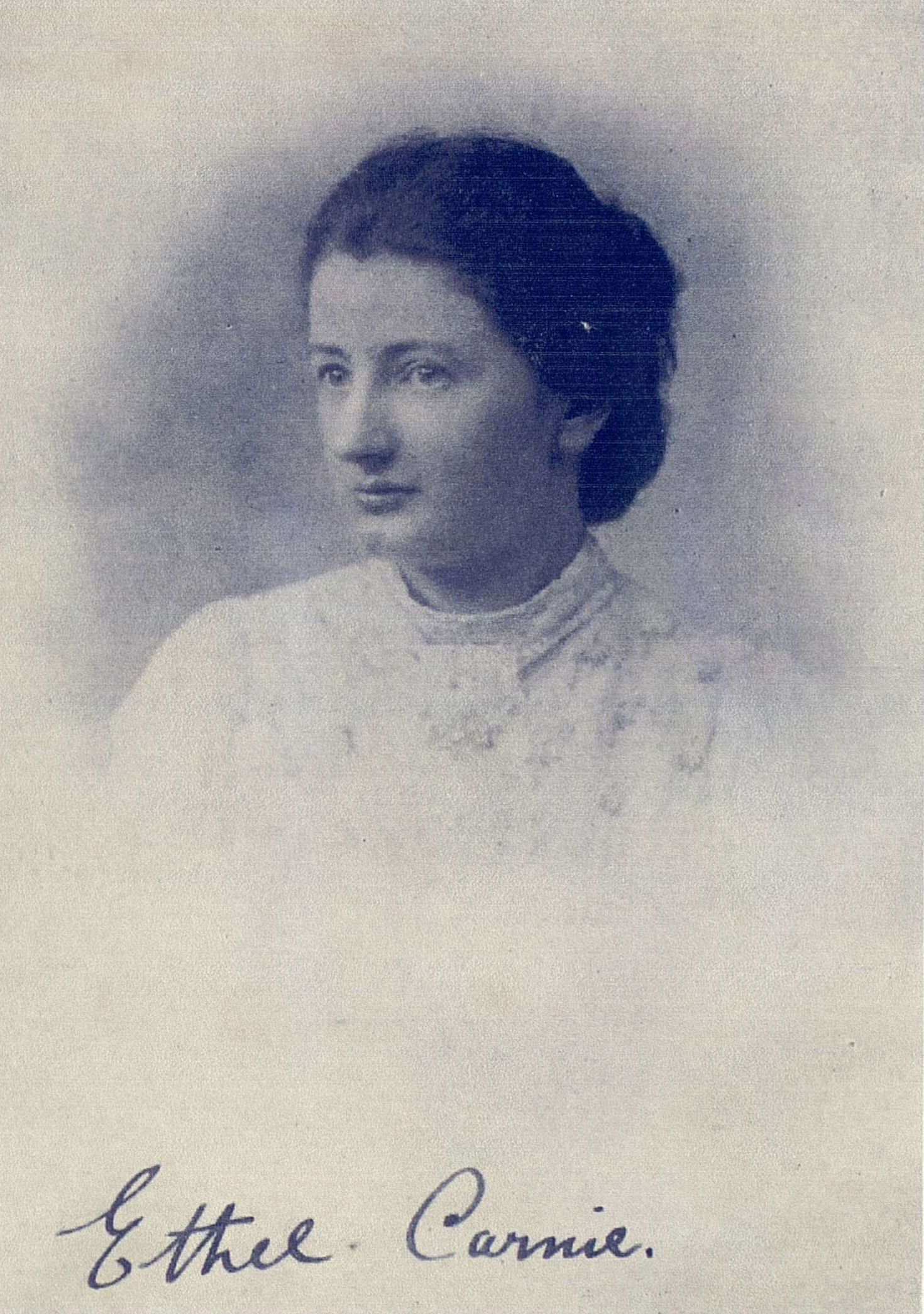
Ethel Carnie Holdsworth, 1908)

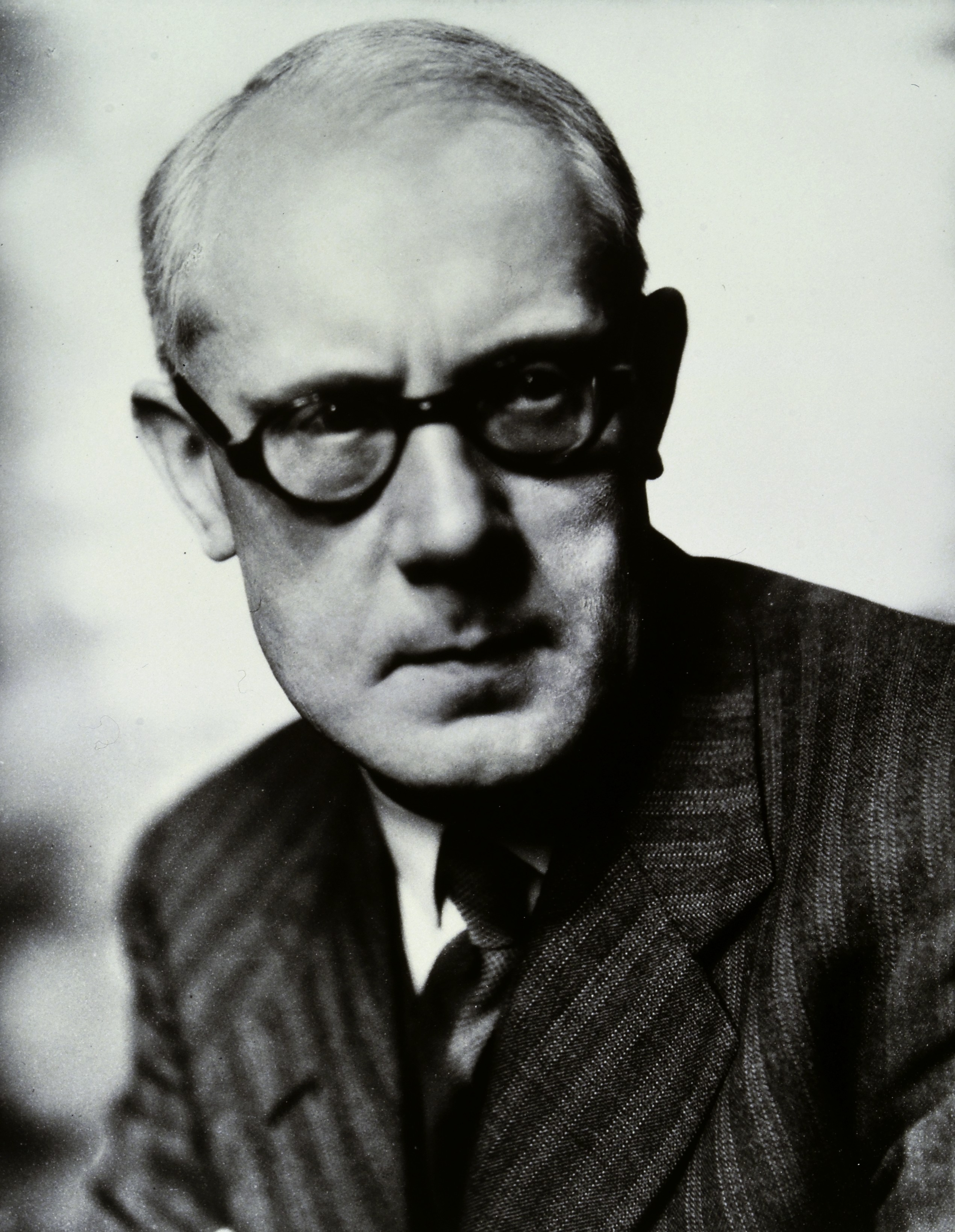
Wilson Smith

- John Mercer (1791–1866), a scientist who developed Mercerisation, a process for treating cotton.
- Samuel Brooks (1793–1864), cotton manufacturer and banker.
- Mortimer Grimshaw (c. 1826–1869), strike leader and political activist
- Thomas Birtwistle (1833–1912), trade unionist and factory inspector, born at Great Harwood.
- Ethel Carnie Holdsworth (1886–1962), a working-class British writer, feminist, and socialist activist.
- George Smith (1895–1967), a British mycologist, studied mildew and moulds that grew on cotton items
- Wilson Smith (1897-1965), physician, virologist and immunologist, developed a vaccine against influenza.
- Netherwood Hughes (1900–2009), World War I veteran, was born in Lord Street.
- Nicholas Freeston (1907–1978), award winning Lancashire poet, who worked as a weaver in cotton mills
- Leslie Duxbury (1926–2005), scriptwriter for Coronation Street, lived locally
- Lesley Mercer (born 1954), a former British trade unionist, President of the Trades Union Congress, 2012-2013
- Steven Pinder (born 1960), actor, played Max Farnham in Brookside
- Mick Jackson (born 1960), writer, best known for his novel of 1997 The Underground Man

=== Sport ===
- Brett Ormerod (born 1976), footballer, played 564 games mainly for Blackpool, grew up on Duke Street.
- David Dunn (born 1979), footballer, played 382 games, including over 300 games for Blackburn Rovers in two sessions.
- Matthew Derbyshire (born 1986), footballer, played over 430 games, mainly with Blackburn Rovers and Rotherham United.
- Lenni Cirino (born 2003), footballer, plays for Gillingham F.C. and Montserrat national football team.
- Raff Cirino (born 2007), footballer, plays for Fleetwood Town F.C. and Montserrat national football team.

== See also ==
- Listed buildings in Great Harwood
- St John's Church, Great Harwood
