= William McConnell (footballer) =

Irish football player (1889–1966)

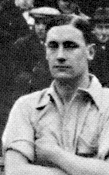
- McConnell with Ireland in 1914

Personal information
- Full name: William George McConnell
- Date of birth: 3 March 1889
- Place of birth: Dublin, Ireland
- Date of death: 6 January 1966 (aged 76)
- Place of death: Dublin, Republic of Ireland
- Position: Full back

Senior career*
Years	Team	Apps	(Gls)
1910–1914	Bohemians		
1914–1915	Bradford (Park Avenue)	4	(0)

International career
1912–1914	Ireland	6	(0)
- * Club domestic league appearances and goals

William George McConnell (3 March 1889 – 6 January 1966) was an Irish footballer in the years before World War I who was part of the first Ireland team to win the British Home Championship outright in 1913–14. During his club career McConnell played mainly for Bohemians.

== Club career ==
McConnell mostly featured at full back for Bohemians. He was part of the Bohs team that lost the Irish Cup Final of 1910–11 against Dublin rivals Shelbourne after a replay. McConnell moved to Bradford (Park Avenue), who had recently been promoted to the top division of the English Football League, in the summer of 1914. McConnell spent a single season in Bradford and helped the team finish a credible ninth place in the league although his appearances for the first team were limited.

== International career ==
McConnell was Ireland's right-back for the entire British Home Championship campaign of 1914, when they won the title outright for the first time. McConnell had a remarkable record at international level. His first game, played at left-back against Wales in 1912, resulted in a 3–2 win. The following year, installed in his favoured right-back role, he played in a 2–1 victory over England at Windsor Park – Ireland's first success against their largest neighbours. During the 1–1 draw against Scotland in the game to secure the championship, McConnell suffered an injury was forced to go into goal for Ireland after Fred McKee was also hurt and had to leave the field. Wearing a sodden goalkeeper's jersey two sizes too small, McConnell was at fault for the Scottish goal which looked to have robbed Ireland of victory as he rushed off his line only to be beaten by forward Joe Donnachie; however Linfield player Samuel Young managed to score the equalising goal.

In his six caps he finished on the losing side just once; 2–1 against Scotland in 1913. In a hard-fought and crowd-troubled match at Dalymount Park, his club home ground, McConnell put in an energetic performance, and only the mis-firing forward-line denied the Irish a more favourable result. He was part of a squad which contained such notable footballers as Bill Lacey, Val Harris and Billy Gillespie but the outbreak of War and the suspension of international games meant that Ireland were not able to build on the success of 1914.

== Honours ==
Bohemians

- Leinster Senior Cup: 1911–12
- Irish Cup: Runner-up 1911

Ireland

- British Home Championship: 1914
