= 1913–14 in Scottish football =

Football in Scotland
- Season: 1913–14

1913–14 in Scottish football

Division One champions
- Celtic

Division Two champions
- Cowdenbeath

Scottish Cup winners
- Celtic

Junior Cup winners
- Larkhall Thistle

Scotland national team
- 1914 BHC

The 1913–14 season was the 41st season of competitive football in Scotland and the 24th season of the Scottish Football League. 1913–14 saw an increase from 18 teams to 20 teams in Division one while the number of teams in Division two was decreased back to 12 from 14.

== League competitions ==
=== Scottish League Division One ===
| Pos | Team | Pld | W | D | L | GF | GA | GD | Pts |
|---|---|---|---|---|---|---|---|---|---|
| 1 | Celtic (C) | 38 | 30 | 5 | 3 | 81 | 14 | +67 | 65 |
| 2 | Rangers | 38 | 27 | 5 | 6 | 79 | 31 | +48 | 59 |
| 3 | Heart of Midlothian | 38 | 23 | 8 | 7 | 70 | 29 | +41 | 54 |
| 4 | Morton | 38 | 26 | 2 | 10 | 76 | 51 | +25 | 54 |
| 5 | Falkirk | 38 | 20 | 9 | 9 | 69 | 51 | +18 | 49 |
| 6 | Airdrieonians | 38 | 18 | 12 | 8 | 72 | 43 | +29 | 48 |
| 7 | Dundee | 38 | 19 | 5 | 14 | 64 | 53 | +11 | 43 |
| 8 | Third Lanark | 38 | 13 | 10 | 15 | 42 | 51 | −9 | 36 |
| 9 | Clyde | 38 | 11 | 11 | 16 | 44 | 44 | 0 | 33 |
| 10 | Ayr United | 38 | 13 | 7 | 18 | 56 | 72 | −16 | 33 |
| 11 | Raith Rovers | 38 | 13 | 6 | 19 | 56 | 57 | −1 | 32 |
| 12 | Kilmarnock | 38 | 11 | 9 | 18 | 48 | 68 | −20 | 31 |
| 13 | Hibernian | 38 | 12 | 6 | 20 | 58 | 75 | −17 | 30 |
| 14 | Aberdeen | 38 | 10 | 10 | 18 | 38 | 55 | −17 | 30 |
| 15 | Partick Thistle | 38 | 10 | 9 | 19 | 37 | 51 | −14 | 29 |
| 16 | Queen's Park | 38 | 10 | 9 | 19 | 52 | 84 | −32 | 29 |
| 17 | Motherwell | 38 | 11 | 6 | 21 | 46 | 65 | −19 | 28 |
| 18 | Hamilton Academical | 38 | 11 | 6 | 21 | 49 | 66 | −17 | 28 |
| 19 | Dumbarton | 38 | 10 | 7 | 21 | 45 | 87 | −42 | 27 |
| 20 | St Mirren | 38 | 8 | 6 | 24 | 38 | 73 | −35 | 22 |

Source: "1913-1914 Division 1 - SPFL Archive". SPFL.
(C) Champions

Champions: Celtic

=== Scottish League Division Two ===
| Pos | Team | Pld | W | D | L | GF | GA | GD | Pts |
|---|---|---|---|---|---|---|---|---|---|
| 1 | Cowdenbeath (C) | 22 | 13 | 5 | 4 | 34 | 17 | +17 | 31 |
| 2 | Albion Rovers | 22 | 10 | 7 | 5 | 38 | 33 | +5 | 27 |
| 3 | Dundee Hibernian | 22 | 11 | 4 | 7 | 36 | 31 | +5 | 26 |
| 3 | Dunfermline Athletic | 22 | 11 | 4 | 7 | 46 | 28 | +18 | 26 |
| 5 | Abercorn | 22 | 10 | 3 | 9 | 32 | 32 | 0 | 23 |
| 5 | St Johnstone | 22 | 9 | 5 | 8 | 48 | 38 | +10 | 23 |
| 7 | East Stirlingshire | 22 | 7 | 8 | 7 | 40 | 36 | +4 | 22 |
| 7 | St Bernard's | 22 | 8 | 6 | 8 | 39 | 31 | +8 | 22 |
| 9 | Arthurlie | 22 | 8 | 4 | 10 | 35 | 38 | −3 | 20 |
| 10 | Leith Athletic | 22 | 5 | 9 | 8 | 31 | 37 | −6 | 19 |
| 11 | Vale of Leven | 22 | 5 | 3 | 14 | 23 | 47 | −24 | 13 |
| 12 | Johnstone | 22 | 4 | 4 | 14 | 21 | 55 | −34 | 12 |

Source: statto.com
Rules for classification: Teams finish equal if level on points. Points system: 2 points for a win, 1 point for a draw, 0 points for a loss
(C) Champions

== Other honours ==
=== Cup honours ===
==== National ====
| Competition | Winner | Score | Runner-up |
|---|---|---|---|
| Scottish Cup | Celtic | 4 – 1 (Note: Replay needed.) | Hinernian |
| Scottish Qualifying Cup | Albion Rovers | 3 – 1 (Note: Second replay needed.) | Dundee Hibs |
| Scottish Consolation Cup | St Johnstone | 2 – 1 | St Bernard's |
| Scottish Junior Cup | Larkhall Thistle | 1 – 0 | Ashfield |
| Scottish Amateur Cup | Cameronians | 2 – 0 | Albert Road School |

==== County ====
| Competition | Winner | Score | Runner-up |
|---|---|---|---|
| Aberdeenshire Cup | Aberdeen | 3 – 0 | Buckie Thistle |
| Ayrshire Cup | Galston | 3 – 2 | Stevenston United |
| Dumbartonshire Cup | Renton | 1 – 0 | Dumbarton |
| East of Scotland Shield | Hearts | 1 – 0 | Hibernian |
| Fife Cup | Dunfermline Athletic | 4 – 1 | Lochgelly United |
| Forfarshire Cup | Arbroath | 2 – 1 | Dundee Hibs |
| Glasgow Cup | Rangers | 3 – 0 | Third Lanark |
| Lanarkshire Cup | Airdrie | 3 – 1 | Royal Albert |
| Linlithgowshire Cup | Broxburn | 2 – 1 | Armadale |
| Perthshire Cup | St Johnstone | 4 – 0 | Morrisonians |
| Renfrewshire Cup | Morton | 5 – 11 (Note: Aggregate over two legs.) | St Mirren |
| Southern Counties Cup | Nithsdale Wanderers | 4 – 3 | Whithorn |
| Stirlingshire Cup | East Stirling | 2 – 1 | Falkirk |

=== Non-league honours ===
Highland League

Top Three
| Pos | Team | Pld | W | D | L | GF | GA | GD | Pts |
|---|---|---|---|---|---|---|---|---|---|
| 1 | Inverness Caledonian | 16 | 9 | 7 | 0 | 29 | 13 | +16 | 25 |
| 2 | Aberdeen 'A' | 16 | 11 | 1 | 4 | 43 | 28 | +15 | 23 |
| 3 | Elgin City | 16 | 8 | 2 | 6 | 30 | 23 | +7 | 18 |

Source: RSSSF

Other Senior Leagues

| Division | Winner |
|---|---|
| Central League | Armadale |
| Eastern League | |
| Northern League | unfinished |
| Perthshire League | Tulloch |
| Scottish Union | Queen's Park Victoria XI (Note: The Victoria XI were the fourth XI of Queen's Park.) |

== Scotland national team ==
| Date | Venue | Opponents | Score | Competition | Scotland scorer(s) |
|---|---|---|---|---|---|
| 28 February 1914 | Celtic Park, Glasgow (H) | Wales | 0–0 | BHC | |
| 14 March 1914 | Windsor Park, Belfast (A) | Ireland | 1–1 | BHC | Joe Donnachie |
| 4 April 1914 | Hampden Park, Glasgow (H) | England | 3–1 | BHC | Charles Thomson, Jimmy McMenemy, Willie Reid |

Key:

- (H) = Home match
- (A) = Away match
- BHC = British Home Championship

| Team | Pld | W | D | L | GF | GA | GD | Pts |
|---|---|---|---|---|---|---|---|---|
| Ireland (C) | 3 | 2 | 1 | 0 | 6 | 2 | +4 | 5 |
| Scotland | 3 | 1 | 2 | 0 | 4 | 2 | +2 | 4 |
| England | 3 | 1 | 0 | 2 | 3 | 6 | −3 | 2 |
| Wales | 3 | 0 | 1 | 2 | 1 | 4 | −3 | 1 |

Rules for classification: 1) points. The points system worked as follows: 2 points for a win and 1 point for a draw.
(C) Champions

== Other national teams ==
=== Scottish League XI ===
| Date | Venue | Opponents | Score (Note: Scottish League XI's score is shown first.) | Scotland scorer(s) |
|---|---|---|---|---|
| 13 October 1913 | Cathkin Park, Glasgow (H) | (England) Southern League XI | 5–0 | |
| 5 November 1913 | Windsor Park, Belfast (A) | (Northern Ireland) Irish League XI | 2–1 | |
| 21 March 1914 | Turf Moor, Burnley (A) | (England) Football League XI | 3–2 | |

== See also ==
- 1913–14 Aberdeen F.C. season
