= 1913–14 British Home Championship =

Tournament details
- Host country: England, Ireland, Scotland and Wales
- Dates: 18 January – 5 April 1914
- Teams: 4

Final positions
- Champions: Ireland (2nd title)
- Runners-up: Scotland

Tournament statistics
- Matches played: 6
- Goals scored: 13 (2.17 per match)
- Top scorer: (Ireland) Billy Gillespie (3 goals)

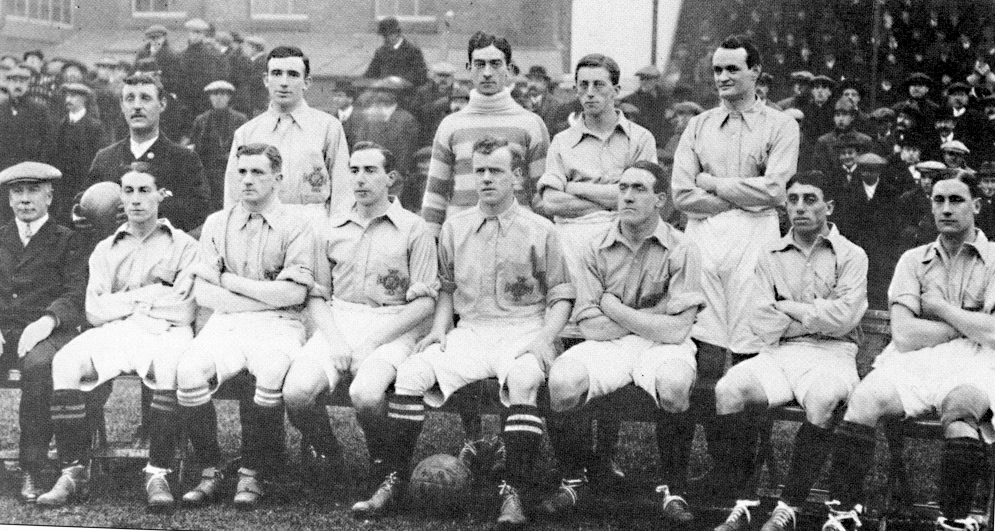
Ireland v Wales during 1914 British Home Championship Back(l-r): Val Harris, Fred McKee, Davy Rollo, Patrick O'Connoll Front(l-r): Trainer, Ted Seymour, Sam Young, Billy Gillespie, Alex Craig, Bill Lacey, Louis Bookman, Bill McConnell

The 1913–14 British Home Championship was the last British Home Championship played before the First World War. The competition was played between January and April 1914 and won by Ireland with a team that included Patrick O’Connell, Billy Gillespie, Val Harris, Louis Bookman, Samuel Young and Bill Lacey.

1913–14 was the first time Ireland won the competition outright. The Irish had been the tournament's poorest performers over the years, but the previous year had demonstrated potential in beating England for the first time, in a 2–1 win at Windsor Park. Ireland began the 1914 tournament beating Wales 2–1 in Wrexham on 19 January and then demolished England in England for the first time, winning 3–0 at Ayresome Park in Middlesbrough. Ireland clinched the title on 16 March, following a 1–1 draw with Scotland at Windsor Park, while England's away victory over Wales did not salvage their poor campaign as Scotland would eventually finish as runners up, beating England 3–1 at Hampden Park. It would be six years before the championship was again contested, and it would be with substantially different teams and in a different, increasingly global era of football.

The third-place finish by England represented that nation's lowest ever final position in the competition up to this point.

== Table ==
| Team | Pld | W | D | L | GF | GA | GD | Pts |
|---|---|---|---|---|---|---|---|---|
| Ireland (C) | 3 | 2 | 1 | 0 | 6 | 2 | +4 | 5 |
| Scotland | 3 | 1 | 2 | 0 | 4 | 2 | +2 | 4 |
| England | 3 | 1 | 0 | 2 | 3 | 6 | −3 | 2 |
| Wales | 3 | 0 | 1 | 2 | 1 | 4 | −3 | 1 |

Rules for classification: 1) points. The points system worked as follows: 2 points for a win and 1 point for a draw.
(C) Champions

== Results ==
19 January 1914

| Wales | 1–2 | Ireland |
|---|---|---|
| Jones 80' (pen.) | | Gillespie 11', 70' |

Racecourse Ground, Wrexham
Attendance: 5,000
Referee: Isaac Baker (England)

14 February 1914

| England | 0–3 | Ireland |
|---|---|---|
| | | Lacey 5', 80'; Gillespie 36' |

Ayresome Park, Middlesbrough
Attendance: 25,000
Referee: Alex Jackson (Scotland)

28 February 1914

| Scotland | 0–0 | Wales |

Celtic Park, Glasgow
Attendance: 10,000
Referee: Harold H. Taylor (England)

14 March 1914

| Ireland | 1–1 | Scotland |
|---|---|---|
| Young 89' | | Donnachie 70' |

Windsor Park, Belfast
Attendance: 31,000
Referee: Herbert S. Bamlett (England)

16 March 1914

| Wales | 0–2 | England |
|---|---|---|
| | | Smith 50'; Wedlock 70' |

Ninian Park, Cardiff
Attendance: 17,586
Referee: Jim Mason (England)

4 April 1914

| Scotland | 3–1 | England |
|---|---|---|
| Thomson 2'; McMenemy 50'; Reid 67' | | Fleming 15' |

Hampden Park, Glasgow
Attendance: 105,000
Referee: Herbert S. Bamlett (England)

== Winning squad ==
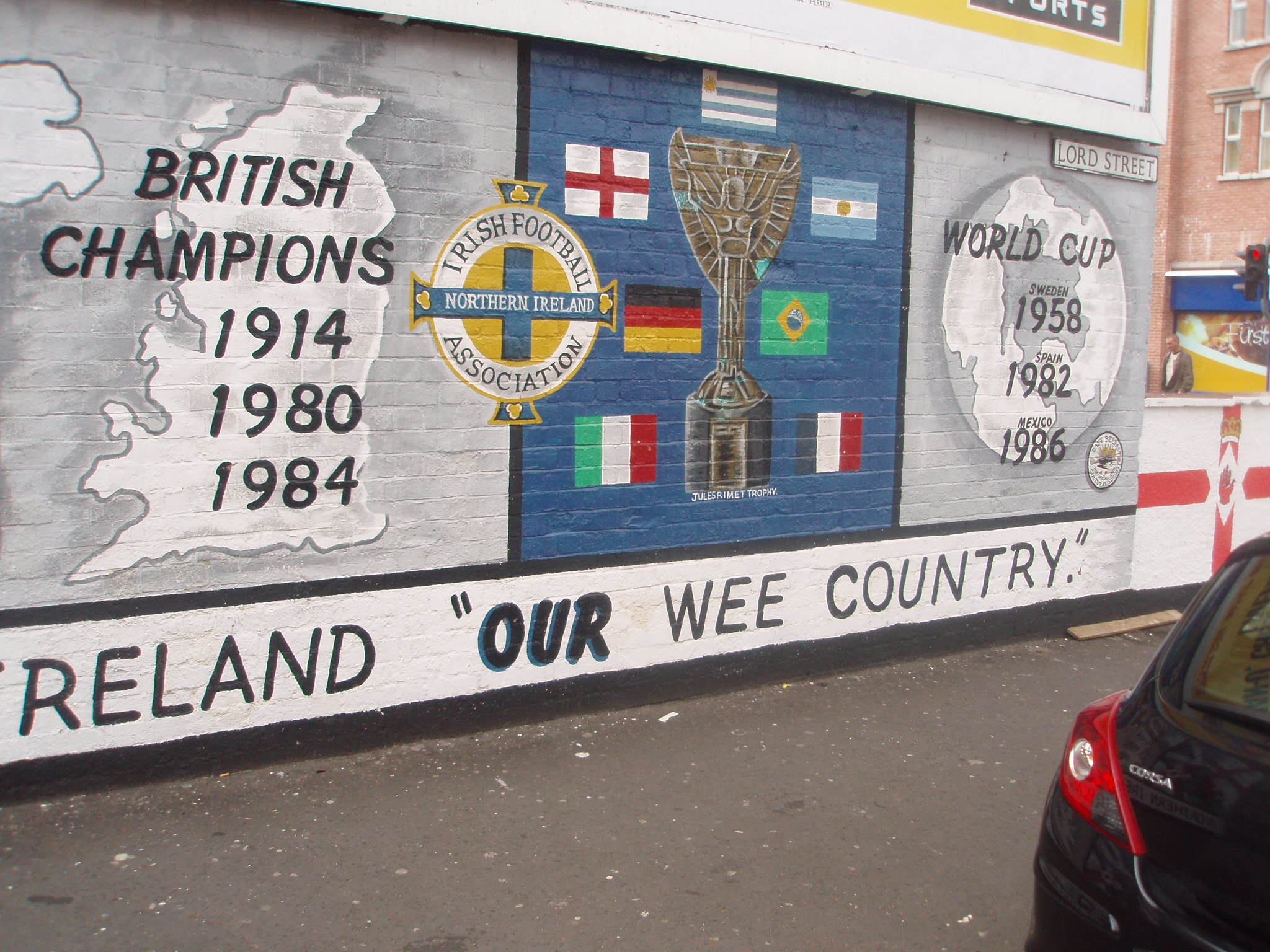
Mural in Belfast celebrating the three outright wins of the British Home Championship by Ireland and Northern Ireland, including in 1914.

- Ireland

| Name | Apps/Goals by opponent | | | Total | |
| Name | (Wales) WAL | (Scotland) SCO | (England) ENG | Apps | Goals |
|---|---|---|---|---|---|
| Bill Lacey | 1 | 1 | 1/2 | 3 | 2 |
| Sam Young | 1 | 1/1 | 1 | 3 | 1 |
| Alex Craig | 1 | 1 | 1 | 3 | 0 |
| Bill McConnell | 1 | 1 | 1 | 3 | 0 |
| Fred McKee | 1 | 1 | 1 | 3 | 0 |
| Pat O'Connell | 1 | 1 | 1 | 3 | 0 |
| Billy Gillespie | 1/2 | | 1/1 | 2 | 3 |
| Dave Rollo | 1 | | 1 | 2 | 0 |
| Mickey Hamill | | 1 | 1 | 2 | 0 |
| Frank Thompson | | 1 | 1 | 2 | 0 |
| Val Harris | 1 | 1 | | 2 | 0 |
| Harry Hampton | | | 1 | 1 | 0 |
| Louis Bookman | 1 | | | 1 | 0 |
| Ted Seymour | 1 | | | 1 | 0 |
| Johnny Houston | | 1 | | 1 | 0 |
| Rab Nixon | | 1 | | 1 | 0 |
