= Mickey Hamill =

Irish footballer (1889–1943)

Personal information
- Full name: Michael Hamill
- Date of birth: 19 January 1889
- Place of birth: Belfast, Ireland
- Date of death: 23 July 1943 (aged 54)
- Place of death: Lisburn, Northern Ireland
- Height: 5 ft 7 1/2 in (1.71 m)
- Position: Wing half

Senior career*
Years	Team	Apps	(Gls)
- St Paul's Swifts
- Belfast Rangers
1909–1910	Belfast Celtic		
1910–1914	Manchester United	57	(2)
1914–1920	Belfast Celtic		
1916–1917	→ Celtic (loan)	7	(0)
1920–1924	Manchester City	118	(1)
1924	Fall River	0	(0)
1924–1926	Boston Soccer Club	64	(1)
1926	New York Giants	1	(0)
1926–1930	Belfast Celtic		

International career
1912–1921	Ireland	7	(1)
- * Club domestic league appearances and goals

Michael Hamill (19 January 1889 – 23 July 1943) was an Irish association football wing half who played professionally in Ireland, Scotland, England, and the United States.

== Biography ==
A native of West Belfast, he learned to play Gaelic football before turning to association football. His first clubs were St. Paul's Swifts and Belfast Rangers. After signing for Belfast Celtic, he made his debut against Shelbourne in 1909 but only became a first-team regular at inside-right from 1910 onwards. A skilful performance in a friendly against Celtic led to Manchester United signing him for a new record fee of £175 on New Year's Eve 1910.

His career at Manchester United was blighted by irregular appearances in the first team. A disagreement over a benefit match led to Hamill returning to Belfast Celtic on a free transfer. The fact that Manchester United received no indemnity for the loss of Hamill's services led to an agreement being established between the Football League and the Irish League regarding the transfer of players between the two leagues.

In 1914, Hamill led Ireland to their first Home Championship win. This included a victory over England at Ayresome Park, Middlesbrough, which was considered by many to be Hamill's greatest-ever game. However, he would be capped by Ireland on just seven occasions; he later refused to play for Ireland until alleged discrimination against Catholic players by the Irish Football Association ceased.

Hamill won his first Irish Cup medal with Belfast Celtic in 1918, playing through a knee injury to lead his team to victory over Linfield.

During World War I, Hamill had played in Scotland for a season with Celtic, winning a League and Charity Cup medal. In 1920, after Belfast Celtic temporarily withdrew from competitive football, he returned to Manchester, this time to play for Manchester City.

Hamill later returned to Belfast Celtic but left again in 1925, just after having married. His destination was Fall River, Massachusetts, where he would play for the Fall River He played only two 1924–1925 pre-season exhibition games with the 'Marksmen'. In the first, he performed masterfully in 3–2 victory over the Boston Soccer Club. His second trial game was a fiasco, and the team released him after the match. He then immediately signed with 'Wonder Workers'. He spent two seasons in Boston before moving to the New York Giants at the start of the 1926–1927 season. He played only one game before returning to Ireland.

When Hamill returned to Ireland, he signed yet again for Belfast Celtic where he ended his playing career after the 1929–1930 season. He would later manage Belfast club Distillery and run the 'Centre-Half Bar' on Belfast's Falls Road.

His drowned body was recovered from the River Lagan at Lisburn on 23 July 1943.
