= McWhinnie =

McWhinnie is a surname. Notable people with the surname include:

- Archie McWhinnie (1926–1971), Scottish footballer
- Debbie McWhinnie (born 1981), Scottish footballer
- Mary Alice McWhinnie (1922–1980), American biologist

== See also ==
- McWhinnie Peak, a mountain of Victoria Land, Antarctica
