= Ledwidge =

Ledwidge is a surname that originated in the hamlet of Upper Ledwyche, Shropshire, England. After the Norman invasion of Ireland a family of this name was granted extensive tracts of land by Hugh de Lacy in the counties of Meath and Westmeath. In common with other Old English families many of these Ledwidges took the losing side in the wars of the 17th century and were dispossessed of their lands. The name was spelt in many different ways; the historian Edward Ledwich noted the following variations: Luitwick, Luitwich, Lutwyche, Ledwith, Ledewich, and Ledwich.

Notable people with the surname include:

- Francis Ledwidge (1887–1917), Irish poet
- Joseph Ledwidge (1877–1953), Irish sportsman
- Michael Ledwidge, American novelist
