= Paul Mackie =

Scottish footballer

Personal information
- Date of birth: 8 November 1963
- Place of birth: Glasgow, Scotland
- Position: Right winger

Senior career*
Years	Team	Apps	(Gls)
- Kilsyth St. Patrick's
1983–1986	Alloa Athletic	33	(0)
1986–1987	Stenhousemuir	6	(1)
- Rutherglen Glencairn
Total		39	(1)
- * Club domestic league appearances and goals

Paul Mackie (born 8 November 1963) is a Scottish former professional footballer who played as a right winger.

== Career ==
Born in Glasgow, Mackie began his career at Kilsyth St. Patrick's, before playing in the Scottish Football League for Alloa Athletic and Stenhousemuir.

He also played for Rutherglen Glencairn.
