= Jack Jones (footballer, born 1907) =

Northern Irish association football player (1966–2002)

Personal information
- Full name: John Jones
- Date of birth: 23 April 1907
- Place of birth: Lurgan, Ireland
- Date of death: 20 March 1986 (aged 78)
- Place of death: Lurgan, Northern Ireland
- Height: 1.80 m (5 ft 11 in)
- Position: Midfielder

Senior career*
Years	Team	Apps	(Gls)
1925–1929	King's Own Scottish Borderers		
1929	Glenavon		
1929–1935	Linfield		
1935–1937	Hibernian	50	(4)
1937–1939	Glenavon		
1939–1940	Bath City		

International career
1928–1930	Ireland amateurs	5	(0)
1930–1937	Ireland	23	(0)
- * Club domestic league appearances and goals

John "Soldier" Jones (23 April 1907 – 20 March 1986) was a Northern Irish footballer who played as a midfielder.

== Playing career ==
Jones joined the King's Own Scottish Borderers in 1925, where he won army high jump and long jump titles. He spent four years with the regiment, including two in Glasgow, and served as a corporal which earned him the nickname "Soldier".

In 1929, while home on leave from the army, he played for Glenavon. Shortly after, he bought himself out of the army and joined Linfield, where he spent his first year as an amateur player. He would turn professional in 1930, and shortly after, made his debut for the Ireland national team. Later on, he served as Linfield's captain.

Following a dispute over a testimonial match, Jones requested to leave Linfield. Despite interest from Dundee, Jones, alongside teammate and midfielder partner Bill Gowdy, signed for Scottish Division One side Hibernian in December 1935 for £6,000, then a record for an Irish player. While still on the books of Hibernian, Jones represented Northern Irish side Portadown during a five-a-side football tournament in May 1937.

He later returned to Glenavon in August 1937, having failed to agree a new contract with Hibernian. There, he helped them reach the final of the 1938–39 Gold Cup, where he captained his side in a 2–1 defeat against Belfast Celtic. In August 1939, he signed for non-league club Bath City.

=== International career ===
Between 1930 and 1937, Jones made 23 appearances for the Ireland national team. He had previously made five appearances for the Ireland amateur national team.

== Coaching career ==
In July 1949, Jones was hired as a trainer by Glenavon, working there until his resignation in June 1962. During this time, he also worked as a scout for the club.

== Personal life and death ==
Jones had two brothers, Sammy and Kenneth, who were both footballers. Meanwhile, his sister married Irish international footballer Billy Mitchell, who played as a half-back for teams like Lisburn Distillery and Chelsea. He was also the cousin of former Northern Irish international footballer Jimmy Jones, who went on trial at Linfield at the suggestion of Jack. He had four children, three sons and a daughter, with two of his sons, Jack Jones Jr. and Bobby Jones, also being footballers.

Following his retirement, he worked for Harland and Wolff during World War II. Jones died in Lurgan Hospital on 20 March 1986, at the age of 78.
