= Bill Lacey (footballer) =

Irish footballer and manager

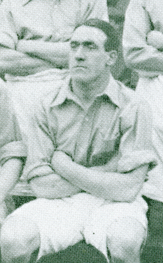

Personal information
- Full name: William Lacey
- Date of birth: 24 September 1889
- Place of birth: Enniscorthy, County Wexford, Ireland
- Date of death: 30 May 1969 (aged 79)
- Height: 5 ft 8 in (1.73 m)
- Positions: Defender; midfielder; forward

Senior career*
Years	Team	Apps	(Gls)
1906–1909	Shelbourne	10	(3)
1909–1912	Everton	37	(11)
1912–1915	Liverpool	99	(12)
- → Belfast United (guest)
- → Linfield (guest)
1919–1924	Liverpool	131	(6)
1924–1925	New Brighton	7	(0)
1925–1931	Shelbourne	66	(12)
1931–1932	Cork Bohemians (player coach)		

International career
1909–1924	Ireland (IFA)	23	(3)
1927–1930	Irish Free State (FAI)	3	(1)
	League of Ireland XI	3	

Managerial career
- 1930s: Irish Free State (FAI)
- 1933–1938: Bohemians
- * Club domestic league appearances and goals

William Lacey (24 September 1889 – 30 May 1969) was an Irish footballer who played for, among others, Shelbourne, Liverpool, Everton and Linfield. Lacey was a dual international and also played for both Ireland teams – the IFA XI and the FAI XI.

An extremely versatile and talented player, Lacey played in all eleven positions during his career. He was a prominent member of the Ireland team that won the 1914 British Home Championship and was also a member of the Liverpool team that won two successive English First Division titles in 1922 and 1923. He was also the first player to be capped at full international level while playing for both Everton and Liverpool. In 1927 at the age of 37, he became the oldest player to make his debut for an FAI XI, and in 1930 at the age of 41 he became the FAI XI's oldest ever player. After retiring as a player, Lacey became a coach, most notably with the FAI XI and Bohemians.

In August 2010, a plaque was unveiled for Bill in his hometown of Enniscorthy coming 14 months after the 40th anniversary of his death in 1969. The plaque was unveiled at his birthplace on the Ross Road, Enniscorthy, County Wexford.

== Club career ==
=== Shelbourne ===
Lacey first played senior football with Shelbourne in 1906 and in 1908, together with Val Harris and Joseph Ledwidge, he helped them reach the final of the Irish Cup. Lacey scored in the 1–1 draw against Bohemians at Dalymount Park and also played in the replay which Shelbourne lost 3–1. After a successful career in the English League, Lacey returned to Shelbourne for a second spell in May 1925 and, together with Harris, helped them win the League of Ireland title in 1926. During his second spell with Shelbourne, he also played three times for the League of Ireland XI.

=== Everton ===
Lacey followed Val Harris to Everton in February 1909 and made his club debut, leading the forward line, in April 1909 against Bradford City. During his time at Everton, he also played as a half-back. While at the Blues he made 37 English League appearances and scored 11 goals. He also played a further 3 games in the FA Cup. Lacey helped Everton finish League runners-up twice and reach the semi-final stage of the 1910 FA Cup. Apart from Harris, his teammates at Everton also included another Irish international, Billy Scott.

=== Liverpool ===
In February 1912 Lacey joined Liverpool. He arrived, along with Tom Gracie, as part of swap that saw Harold Uren join Everton. Lacey made his Liverpool debut, as a left-winger, on 2 March 1912 in a First Division match against Middlesbrough. The game finished as a 1–1 draw. He scored his first goal for the club on 16 March in a 2–1 home defeat to Tottenham Hotspur. Lacey would eventually make 230 league appearances and scored 18 league goals for Liverpool. He also made a further 28 appearances and scored another 11 goals in the FA Cup. In 1914, playing as an inside forward, he scored 5 goals in 7 games as he helped Liverpool reach their first ever FA Cup final. However Liverpool lost the match 1–0 to Burnley.

During the First World War, Lacey returned to Ireland and played as a guest in the Belfast and District League, first for the now defunct team, Belfast United, and then for Linfield. While with Linfield he helped them reach two successive Irish Cup finals in 1918 and 1919, finishing as runners-up and winners respectively. After returning to Liverpool, Lacey helped them win two successive First Division titles in 1922 and 1923. Among his teammates at Liverpool during this era where Ephraim Longworth and Elisha Scott. Lacey left Liverpool in June 1924 and briefly played with New Brighton before returning to Shelbourne.

== Irish international ==
When Lacey began his international career in 1909, Ireland was represented by a single team, selected by the Belfast-based Irish Football Association. However, during the 1920s, Ireland was partitioned into Northern Ireland and the Irish Free State. Amid these political upheavals, a rival association, the Football Association of Ireland, emerged in Dublin and from 1924 organised its own national team. As a result, several notable Irish players from this era, including Lacey played for both teams – the IFA XI and the FAI XI.

=== IFA XI ===
Between 1909 and 1924, Lacey won 23 caps and scored 3 goals for the IFA XI. He won the first 10 caps while at Everton, the next 12 at Liverpool and his last with New Brighton. He made his international debut on 13 February 1909 in a 4–0 defeat to England and then on 20 March he scored his first international goal in a 3–2 defeat against Wales.

Although Lacey only scored two more goals for the IFA XI, they would prove significant. Along with Val Harris, Patrick O'Connell and Billy Gillespie, Lacey helped Ireland win the 1914 British Home Championship. On 14 February, he scored twice as Ireland beat England 3–0 at Ayresome Park. In a game which saw Lacey play in three different positions, including in goal, Ireland then clinched the title following a 1–1 draw with Scotland at Windsor Park in Belfast. He made his last appearance for the IFA XI on 22 October 1924 in 3–1 defeat against England.

=== FAI XI ===
After returning to Shelbourne, Lacey also made 3 appearances and scored 1 goal for the FAI XI. On 23 April 1927, at the age of 37, he became the oldest player to ever make his debut for the FAI XI when he was selected to play against Italy B – this was later surpassed in 1931 by 40-year-old Patsy Gallacher whose first appearance was also his last. On 12 February 1928 Lacey inspired the FAI XI to a comeback. 2–0 down at half-time, he scored the FAI XI's opening goal in a 4–2 away win against Belgium. On 11 May 1930, at the age of 41, he became the oldest player ever to play for the FAI XI when he played against Belgium again. In his three appearances for the FAI XI, he played as outside-right, inside-right and right-back.

== Coaching career ==
=== FAI XI ===
During the 1930s, Lacey also coached the FAI XI on several occasions. At the time the team was selected by a committee of selectors and coaches were appointed on a game by game basis. Lacey took charge of the FAI XI on at least four occasions. On 13 December 1931, he was in charge of the FAI XI that lost 5–0 to Spain. He had little chance to influence the result as he was unable to get in touch with all the players until the morning of the game. On 25 February 1934, Lacey was also in charge of the first FAI XI to compete in a FIFA World Cup qualifier. The team, featuring Paddy Moore, Jimmy Kelly and Joe Kendrick, drew 4–4 with Belgium with Moore scoring all four goals for the FAI XI. Lacey also coached the FAI XI that played the Netherlands on 5 December 1935. In terms of preparation, the team did better than usual, with Lacey organising three coaching sessions the week before the game. Despite this, the FAI XI still lost 5–2. However, on 17 October 1936, Lacey coached the FAI XI to one of their best results of the pre-Second World War era when a team featuring Paddy Moore and Tom Davis, beat Germany 5–2 at Dalymount Park.

=== Bohemians ===
Lacey was appointed coach of Bohemians at the start of the 1933–34 season. With a team that included Fred Horlacher and Billy Jordan, he subsequently guided them to a League of Ireland and League of Ireland Shield double. He also guided them to an FAI Cup win in 1935.

== Honours ==
=== Player ===
Shelbourne

- Irish Cup runners-up:1907–08
- League of Ireland winners: 1925–26
- League of Ireland Shield winners: 1926

Everton

- First Division runners-up: 1908–09, 1911–12

Ireland

- 1914 British Home Championship: 1914

Liverpool

- Football League champions:1921–22, 1922–23
- FA Cup runners-up: 1914

Linfield

- Irish Cup winners: 1918–19
  - runners-up: 1917–18

=== Manager ===
Bohemians

- League of Ireland champions: 1933–34
- FAI Cup winners: 1935
- League of Ireland Shield winners: 1934
