= Johnny Houston =

Irish footballer

Personal information
- Full name: John Houston
- Date of birth: 14 May 1889
- Place of birth: Ahoghill, Ireland
- Date of death: 11 December 1964 (aged 75)
- Place of death: Belfast, Northern Ireland
- Position: Forward

Senior career*
Years	Team	Apps	(Gls)
–1912	South End Olympic		
1912–1913	Linfield		
1913–1915	Everton	26	(2)
1915–1919	Linfield		
1919–1920	Ulster Rangers		
1919–1920	Partick Thistle	17	(0)

International career
1912	Irish League XI	2	(0)
1912–1914	Ireland	6	(0)
- * Club domestic league appearances and goals

John Houston MM & Bar (14 May 1889 – 11 December 1964) was an Irish professional footballer who played as a forward in the Football League for Everton and in the Scottish League for Partick Thistle. He was capped by Ireland at international level and represented the Irish League XI.

== Personal life ==
Houston served in the Royal Irish Rifles before and during the First World War and held the rank of acting colour sergeant. His brother Leslie died of wounds during the war. Houston won the Military Medal in 1917 for conspicuous bravery, when "during an attack on the enemy’s lines all the officers were put out of action and Sergeant Houston took command of his platoon. Houston led the attack in face of a murderous fire, advance 100 yards and succeeded in taking and holding the objective for 36 hours until relief arrived". He was later awarded a bar to his Military Medal. Houston married in 1915 and later worked at the Belfast General Post Office. He served in the Tank Corps during the Second World War.

== Career statistics ==
Appearances and goals by club, season and competition
Club	Season	League			National Cup		Other		Total	
Club	Season	Division	Apps	Goals	Apps	Goals	Apps	Goals	Apps	Goals
Everton	1912–13	First Division	7	0	2	0	―		9	0
Everton	1913–14	First Division	18	2	0	0	―		18	2
Everton	1914–15	First Division	1	0	0	0	―		1	0
Everton	Total		26	2	2	0	―		28	2
Partick Thistle	1919–20	Scottish First Division	17	0	3	1	3 (Note: Appearances in Glasgow Cup)	0	23	1
Career total			43	2	5	1	3	0	51	3

== Honours ==
Linfield

- Irish Cup: 1915–16
