= Alex Craig (footballer) =

Irish footballer (1886–1951)

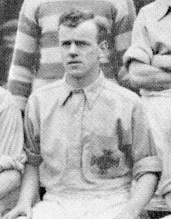
- Craig with Ireland in 1914

Personal information
- Full name: Alexander Breckenridge Craig
- Date of birth: 2 April 1886
- Place of birth: Galway, Ireland
- Date of death: 16 February 1951 (aged 64)
- Place of death: Glasgow, Scotland
- Position: Full-back

Senior career*
Years	Team	Apps	(Gls)
- Rutherglen Glencairn
1905–1912	Rangers	102	(0)
1911–1912	→ Morton (loan)	28	(0)
1912–1914	Morton	52	(1)
1914–1916	Rangers	42	(0)
- Johnstone

International career
1908–1914	Ireland	9	(0)
1915	SFL XI (wartime)	1	(0)
- * Club domestic league appearances and goals

Alexander Breckenridge Craig (born 2 April 1886 – 16 February 1951) was a footballer who played for Rangers, Greenock Morton and Ireland as a left back.

He is one of only four players born in what is now the Republic of Ireland to play for Rangers; the others were Alex Stevenson, Jon Daly and James Lowry McAuley.

== Career ==
=== Club ===
Galway-born Craig had moved to Scotland with his family by the time of the 1891 United Kingdom Census, residing in the Hutchesontown district of Glasgow. He joined Rangers from junior side Rutherglen Glencairn in January 1905. His initial seasons at Ibrox Park coincided with a rare lean spell for the club, and he left without a single major winner's medal. The closest he came was in 1905 when Rangers lost a replayed Scottish Cup final 3–1 to Third Lanark. In his last season, 1910–11, Rangers did win the league title, but Craig made just a single appearance and so was not entitled to a medal.

By the time of his move to Greenock Morton, Craig was proving his versatility by slotting in regularly on the left-hand side of defence. In May 1914 he returned to Rangers, making his second debut in a Glasgow Charity Cup Final defeat by Celtic. He was a regular in the Gers side for the initial war-time campaign and was still on the club's books when hostilities ended though his last appearances were made in April 1916. Still without a significant club honour, Craig finished his playing days in the Western League with Johnstone.

=== International ===
Craig's international career began as he reaped the benefits of Billy McCracken's expulsion by the Irish FA. He made his Ireland debut in a 3–1 defeat by England in February 1908, playing in each of that year's British Home Championship ties at right-back. But it was at left-back that Craig played during each of the 1914 Home Championship games as Ireland claimed the title outright for the first time.
