= Harry Hampton (footballer, born 1888) =

Irish footballer

Personal information
- Full name: Henry Verner Hampton
- Date of birth: 1888
- Place of birth: Dublin, Ireland
- Date of death: 3 August 1946 (aged 57–58)
- Place of death: Derby, England
- Position: Half back

Senior career*
Years	Team	Apps	(Gls)
1908–1910	Dundee	0	(0)
1910–1914	Bradford City	47	(0)
1914–1915	Distillery	4	(0)
Total		51	(0)

International career
1911–1914	Ireland	9	(0)
- * Club domestic league appearances and goals

Henry Verner Hampton (1888 – 3 August 1946) was an Irish international footballer who played professionally in Scotland and England as a half back.

== Career ==
Born in Dublin, Hampton moved from Scottish club Dundee (where he had only played in the reserves) to English club Bradford City in March 1910. He returned to Ireland in May 1914 to play with Distillery.

Hampton also represented Ireland at international level, earning 9 caps between 1911 and 1914.
