= Rutherglen Glencairn F.C. =

Association football club in Scotland

Rutherglen Glencairn
- Full name: Rutherglen Glencairn Football Club
- Nickname: The Glens
- Founded: 1896; 130 years ago
- Ground: The Hamish B Allan Stadium (New Southcroft Park); Rutherglen
- Capacity: 1,500
- Coordinates: 55°49′50″N 4°13′31″W
- Manager: Joe Pryce & Billy Ogilvie
- League: West of Scotland League Premier Division
- 2025–26: West of Scotland League Premier Division, 15th of 16
- Website: https://rutherglenglencairn.com
Home colours	Away colours

Rutherglen Glencairn Football Club is a Scottish football club based in Rutherglen, South Lanarkshire, near Glasgow. Nicknamed The Glens and formed in 1896, they play at The Hamish B Allan Stadium (New Southcroft Park).

Glencairn currently play in the West of Scotland League Premier Division. Trophy successes include the SJFA West Region Championship in 2018–19, the Stagecoach Central District League Division One championship in the 2008–09 season and the West Region Super League Division One title in 2018–19 and 2009–10. The latter gave the club the right to compete in the West Region Super Premier League for the first time in the 2010–11 season.

The club is currently managed by Co-Managers Joe Pryce and Billy Ogilvie, while Willie Harvey is now General Manager.

== History ==
Chart of Glencairn's yearly table positions in the Scottish Junior Football leagues from 2003 to 2017

Rutherglen Glencairn F.C. were formed in 1895 at the 'Old Jail' office in Rutherglen.

The Glens played their first-ever game on 15 August 1896 against the Ibrox XI (Rangers' junior string in those days) and the Glens won 1–0. The Southcroft team joined the Glasgow Junior League and won it in 1899–1900 to take possession of the "Evening Times Trophy".

The Glens' moment did not arrive until season 1901–02 when they won the Scottish Junior Cup, the Glasgow League Championship, and the Glasgow Exhibition Championship. The team brought the Scottish Junior Cup to Rutherglen for the first time by beating Maryhill 1–0 at Meadowside includes future Scotland senior international forwards Jimmy McMenemy and Alec Bennett, both natives of the town.

It was not until 1918–19 that the Glens won the Scottish Junior Cup again, beating St Anthony's 1–0.

Glencairn's third Scottish Junior Cup win was in season 1926–27 and the satisfaction was all the greater because it was Cambuslang Rangers, their great local rivals, who were defeated 2–1. The Glens won the Scottish Junior Cup again for the last time in season 1938–39 when Shawfield (the other local rivals, from Oatlands) went down 2–1.

Glencairn's recent success has been in their rise through the junior leagues in which they were crowned champions of both the West of Scotland League Central District First Division in 2009 and the West of Scotland Super League First Division in 2010.

In 2020, the club confirmed their intention to leave the separate Junior setup and join a proposed feeder division for the Lowland Football League, part of the pyramid system below the professional level of the Scottish game.

== Crest ==
The current Glencairn crest is heavily influenced from the town of Rutherglen's official blazon and consists of the club's initials with a football centrepiece watched over by guardian angels at each side. Rutherglen's motto 'Ex Fumo Fama' , which translates as 'Fame From Smoke', is incorporated.

== Stadium ==
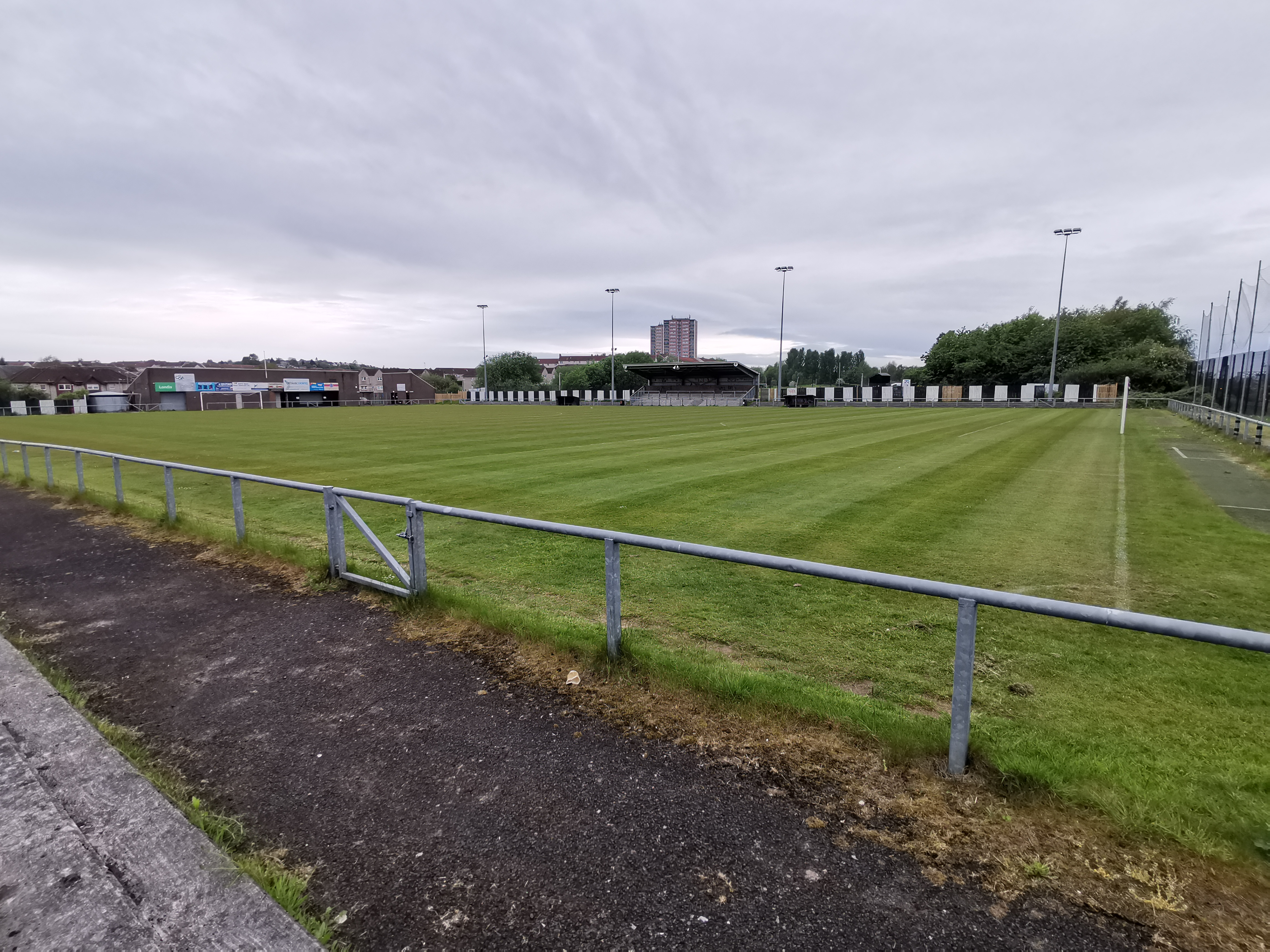
View from north-east

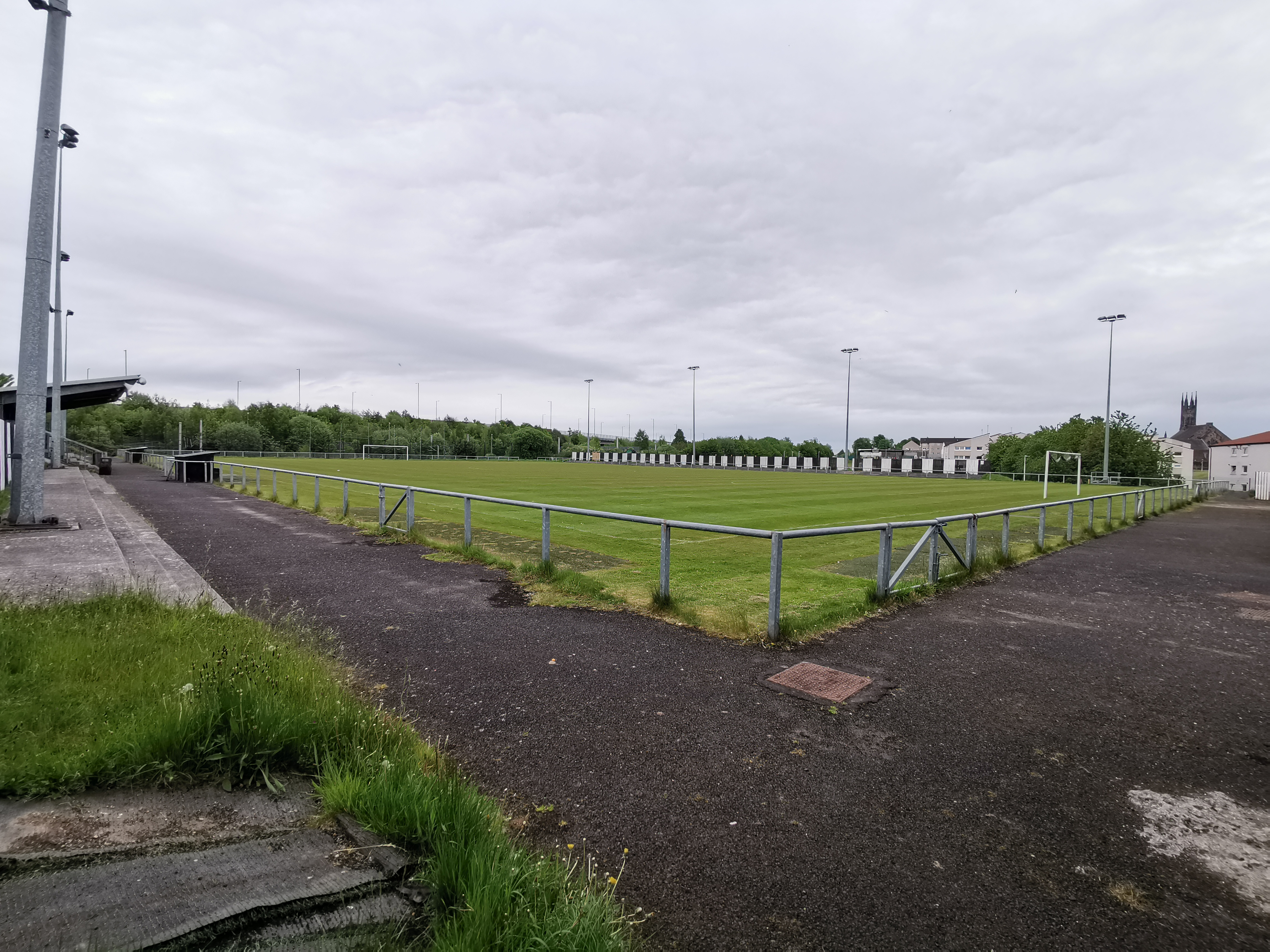
View from south-west

The club plays its home games at Hamish B. Allan Stadium in the Burnhill district of Rutherglen, after the original Southcroft Park on Glasgow Road in the town's Shawfield district was demolished in 2007 to make way for the M74 motorway extension into central Glasgow. The original ground had survived for 110 years and was the oldest Junior football ground in Scotland when it closed; the final game was a 1–0 victory over Dunipace in October 2006. Its banked terracing areas also contained toxic Chromium VI, a byproduct from the nearby chemical factory; this was also found to be the case at other stadiums in the local area: Lesser Hampden and Rosebery Park.

The new ground (on the opposite side of the motorway from the original site) was officially opened in July 2008 with a friendly match between Glencairn and Clyde, whose previous home Shawfield Stadium had been just yards from the original Southcroft Park.

In August 2009, the club signed a lucrative sponsorship deal with local urban regeneration company Clyde Gateway to sponsor New Southcroft Park for two years, and it was renamed the Clyde Gateway Stadium. This arrangement was extended for another two seasons in 2012. In 2014 the sponsor became Celsius Cooling Ltd and the ground was duly renamed as The Celsius Stadium. In August 2020 the stadium was renamed 'The Hamish B Allan Stadium' in honour of a lifelong supporter and committee member.

Rutherglen Glencairn entered discussions with Clyde in 2012 about the possibility of sharing the stadium. Although the changing facilities are modern, other things would need improvement to meet Scottish Football League regulations. The proposal was eventually dropped by Clyde in favour of a proposed move to East Kilbride, which was also never realised.

== Current squad ==
Updated 2 July 2026

Note: Flags indicate national team as defined under FIFA eligibility rules; some limited exceptions apply. Players may hold more than one non-FIFA nationality.

No.	Pos.	Nation	Player
—	GK	SCO	Glen Cameron
—	GK	SCO	Scott McLellan
—	GK	SCO	James Scott
—	DF	SCO	Aiden McLaughlin
—	DF	SCO	Alan Dunsmore
—	DF	SCO	Ben Hobbs (on loan at Knightswood Juveniles)
—	DF	SCO	Calum McEwan
—	DF	SCO	Jordan Scott
—	DF	SCO	Kyle Chrystal
—	DF	SCO	Leon Boomer
—	DF	SCO	Lewis Blane
—	DF	SCO	Liam Coyne
—	DF	SCO	Ronan Shiels
—	DF	SCO	Matthew Meechan

No.	Pos.	Nation	Player
—	MF	SCO	Andy McLaughlin
—	MF	SCO	Dylan Collins
—	MF	SCO	Allan Woodhouse
—	MF	SCO	Grant Brennan
—	MF	SCO	Sean McGuire (Captain)
—	MF	SCO	Jay McKay
—	MF	SCO	Matthew Gear
—	MF	SCO	Martin McBride
—	MF	SCO	Marc Risi
—	MF	SCO	Michael Foley (on-loan at Ashfield)
—	MF	SCO	Ross Smith
—	FW	SCO	Barry Peters
—	FW	SCO	Dylan Henry
—	FW	SCO	Josh McGrillen
—	FW	SCO	Ryan McManus
—	FW	SCO	Bradley Wilkie

== Club Officials ==
=== Club Officials ===
President	Elizabeth Allan
Vice-president	Andy Handlin
Club secretary	Peter Ferguson

=== Management ===
The management staff of Rutherglen Glencairn as of season 2023-24 are:

General Manager	Willie Harvey
Co-Manager	Joe Pryce
Co-Manager	Billy Ogilvie
Coach	Tam Miller
Goalkeeping coach	Stevie Hutchison
Sports Therapist	Leah Giudici
Kitman	Alex Forbes

=== Managerial history ===
2023-Current	Joe Pryce
2010-2023	Willie Harvey

== Honours ==
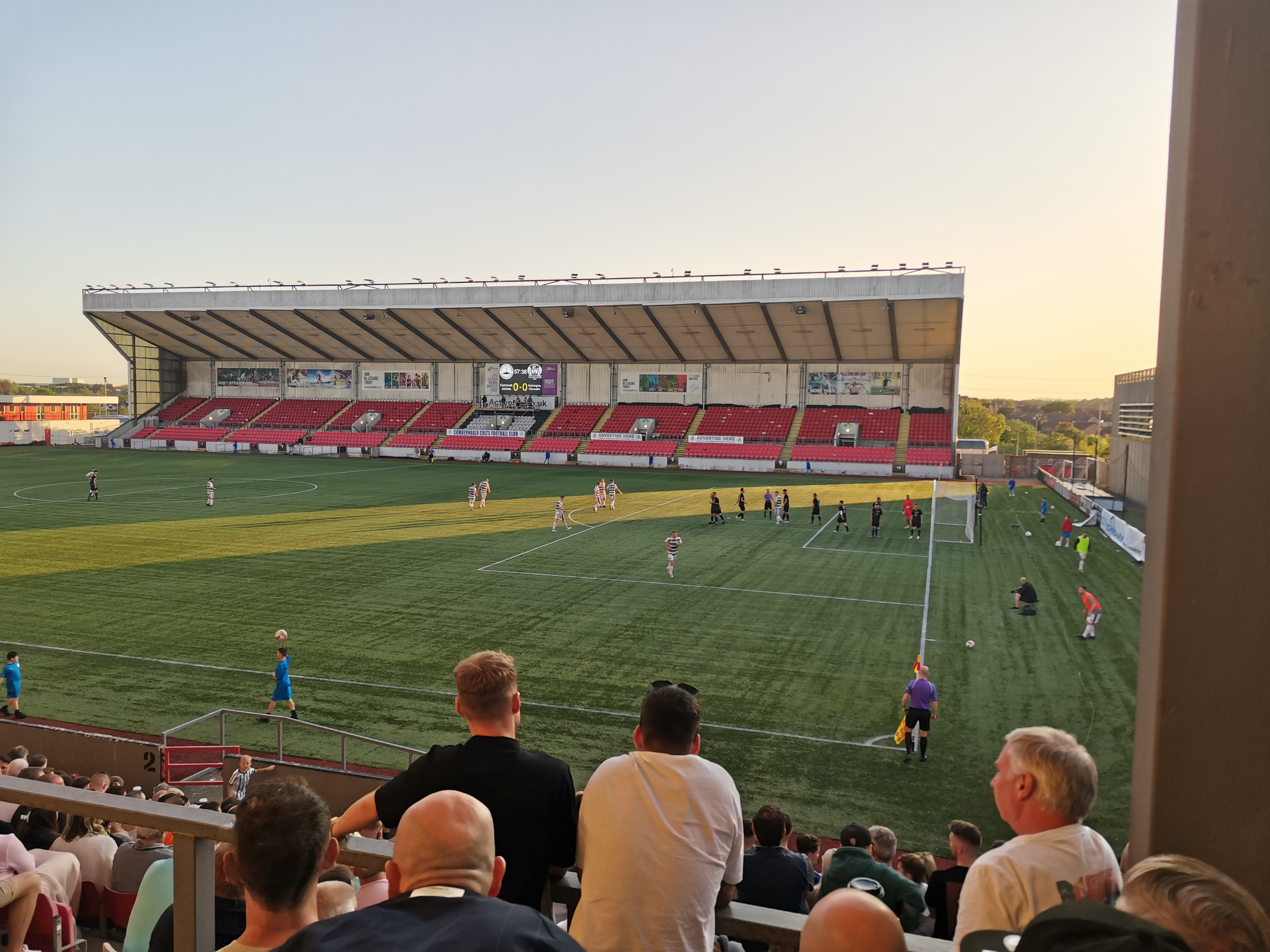
Action from the 2023 Scottish Junior Cup final

Scottish Junior Cup

- Winners: 1901–02, 1918–19, 1926–27, 1938–39
- Runners-up: 1966–67, 1974–75, 2022–23

West of Scotland Super League First Division

- Winners: 2009–10, 2018–19

=== Other honours ===
- West of Scotland League Central District First Division winners: 2008–09
- Glasgow Junior League winners: 1898–99, 1901–02, 1918–19, 1921–22
- Central League champions: 1933–34, 1942–43, 1966–67
- Central League B Division winners: 1974–75
- Glasgow Junior Cup winners: 1899–1900, 1923–24, 1934–35, 1937–38, 1942–43
- Glasgow Dryburgh Cup winners: 1939–40
- Central Junior League Cup winners: 1998–99
- Central Sectional League Cup 1991–92, 2007–08

== Final league positions ==
Rutherglen Glencairn's recent final league positions are shown in the table below:

Season	League	Final Position	Notes
2019-20	SJFA West Region Premiership	15th	Season abandoned due to COVID19 pandemic. League positions decided on a points per game basis.
2018-19	SJFA West Region Championship	1st	Promoted as Champions
2017-18	West of Scotland Super League First Division	7th
2016-17	West of Scotland Super League First Division	5th
2015-16	West of Scotland Super League First Division	7th
2014-15	West of Scotland Super League First Division	5th
2013–14	West of Scotland Super League First Division	7th
2012–13	West of Scotland Super League First Division	6th
2011–12	West of Scotland Super League First Division	6th
2010–11	Scottish Junior Football West Premier League	12th	Relegated
2009–10	West of Scotland Super League First Division	1st	Promoted as Champions
2008–09	Scottish Junior Football Central Division One	1st	Promoted as Champions
2007–08	Scottish Junior Football Central Division One	4th
2006–07	Scottish Junior Football Central Division One	5th
2005–06	Scottish Junior Football Central Division One	3rd
2004–05	Scottish Junior Football Central Division One	8th
2003–04	Scottish Junior Football Central Division One	9th
2002–03	Scottish Junior Football Central Division One	2nd
2001–02	Scottish Junior Football Central Division One	4th
2000–01	Central League Premier Division	10th	Relegated
1999–2000	Scottish Junior Football Central Division One	2nd	Promoted
1998–99	Scottish Junior Football Central Division One	12th

== Youth Development ==
Willie Harvey became the new manager before the start of the 2010–11 Super Premier League Season and established under-21 and under-19 teams under youth team manager Alex McArthur. The under-21 team competes in West of Scotland Under 21 League Division One, and the under-19 team in the Cumbernauld & Kilsyth District League. To emphasise the importance of youth development, Harvey said, "Every now and again you find a real gem. Somewhere down the line you will find someone who can have a good, strong career. We want to be the side that clubs are trying to poach players from but at the same time we will have first dibs on the best players coming through."

The 2012–13 season was one to remember for the young Glens. Managers Andy McFadyen and Alex McArthur, as well as coach George Fortheringham, led the 21s to winning the treble, a historic moment for the club. An unforgettable night at Glencairn's home pitch saw a Rutherglen last minute equaliser against Knightswood in the final game of the season clinch the West of Scotland Premier League for the first time in the club's history. The Glens also went on to win the League Cup in style after defeating Goldenhill in a 4–1 encounter played at Shettleston. Finally the boys wrapped up an emphatic season with a penalty shoot out victory against Knightswood in the West of Scotland Cup final.

== Notable former players ==
- Jimmy Bain – Manchester United, Brentford
- Sammy Baird – Clyde, Rangers, Hibernian, Scotland
- Alec Bennett – Celtic, Rangers, Dumbarton, Scotland
- Kenny Campbell – Liverpool, Partick Thistle, Leicester City, Scotland
- Alex Craig – Rangers, Morton, Ireland
- Joe Donnachie – Everton, Oldham Athletic, Scotland
- Rob McKinnon – Hartlepool United, Motherwell, FC Twente, Hearts, Scotland
- Jimmy McMenemy – Celtic, Partick Thistle, Scotland
- Archie McWhinnie - Wrexham A.F.C., Wales
- Archie Robertson – Clyde, Morton, Scotland
- Bernie Slaven – Albion Rovers, Middlesbrough, Republic of Ireland
- Jimmy Soye – Southampton, Aberdeen
- Bobby Ward – Newport County
