= Billy Scott (footballer, born 1882) =

Irish footballer (1882–1936)

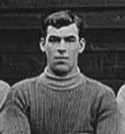

Personal information
- Full name: William Edward Scott
- Date of birth: 17 May 1882
- Place of birth: Belfast, Ireland
- Date of death: 15 August 1936 (aged 54)
- Place of death: Walton, Liverpool, England
- Height: 5 ft 11 1/2 in (1.82 m)
- Position: Goalkeeper

Senior career*
| Years | Team | Apps | (Gls) |
| 1901–1903 | Cliftonville | | |
| 1903–1904 | Linfield | | |
| 1904–1912 | Everton | 251 | (0) |
| 1912–1914 | Leeds City | 26 | (0) |
| 1914–19xx | Liverpool | 0 | (0) |

International career
| 1903–1913 | Ireland | 25 | (0) |
- * Club domestic league appearances and goals

William Edward Scott (17 May 1882 – 16 August 1936) was an Irish footballer who played as a goalkeeper for, among others, Everton, Leeds City, Liverpool and Ireland. In 1913 Scott was a member of the Ireland team that beat England for the first time with a 2–1 win at Windsor Park. His younger brother, Elisha Scott, was also a notable goalkeeper and also played for Liverpool and Ireland. It was Billy Scott who recognised his younger brother's potential and recommended him to Liverpool after an unsuccessful trial at Everton.

== Club career ==
Scott was born in Belfast. After playing for Cliftonville and Linfield, Scott joined Everton in July 1904. He spent eight years at the club, playing 251 English League games and helping the club finish runners-up in the First Division three times. Scott also played a further 38 games for Everton in the FA Cup, including two appearances in the final. His teammates at the club included fellow Irish internationals Val Harris and Bill Lacey. In August 1912 Scott joined Leeds City where he played under Herbert Chapman and alongside another Irish international, Billy Gillespie. After leaving Leeds, Scott returned to Merseyside where he played 27 games for Liverpool during the First World War.

== International career ==
Between 1903 and 1913 Scott played 25 times for Ireland. In 1903, together with Jack Kirwan, Archie Goodall, Billy McCracken and Robert Milne, he was a member of the Ireland team that won a share in the 1903 British Home Championship. On 15 February 1913 Scott, along with Val Harris and two-goal hero Billy Gillespie, was a member of the Ireland team that beat England for the first time with a 2–1 win at Windsor Park.

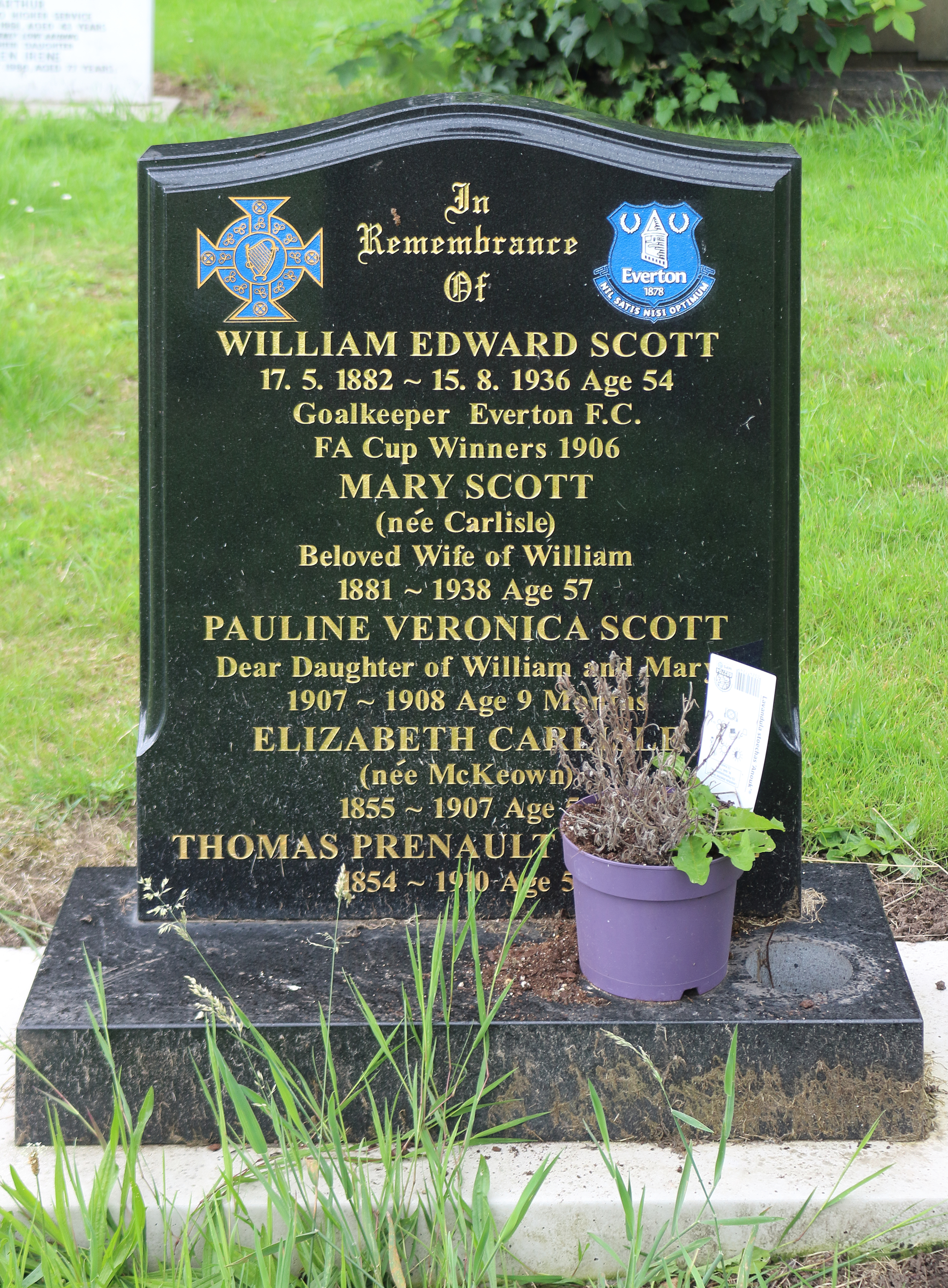
Scott's grave

== Honours ==
Linfield

- Irish Cup: 1901–02, 1903–04
- Irish League: 1901–02, 1903–04

Everton

- FA Cup: 1906; runner-up 1907
- First Division runner-up: 1904–05, 1908–09, 1911–12

Ireland

- British Home Championship: 1903 (shared)

== Sources ==
- Tony Matthews (14 November 2004). Who's Who of Everton. Mainstream Publishing. ISBN 1-84596-140-4.
- Tony Matthews (6 July 2006). Who's Who of Liverpool. Mainstream Publishing. ISBN 1-84596-140-4.
- Joyce, Michael (2004). Football League Players' Records 1888 to 1939. Nottingham: SoccerData (Tony Brown). p. 233. ISBN 978-1-899468-67-6.
