= Evan Jones (footballer) =

Welsh footballer

Personal information
- Date of birth: 20 October 1888
- Place of birth: Wales

International career
Years	Team	Apps	(Gls)
1910–1914	Wales	7	(0)

Evan Jones (born 20 October 1888) was a Welsh international footballer. He was part of the Wales national football team between 1910 and 1914, playing 7 matches. He played his first match on 5 March 1910 against Scotland and his last match on 19 January 1914 against Ireland.

== See also ==
- List of Wales international footballers (alphabetical)
