= Samuel Young (footballer) =

Irish association footballer

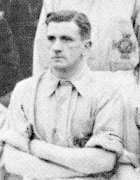
- Young with Ireland in 1914

Personal information
- Full name: Samuel Young
- Date of birth: 14 February 1883
- Place of birth: Belfast, Ireland
- Date of death: 28 November 1954 (aged 71)
- Position: Winger

Senior career*
Years	Team	Apps	(Gls)
????–1908	Linfield	?	(?)
1908–1912	Airdrie	131	(32)
1912–1913	Portsmouth	13	(3)
1913–????	Linfield	?	(?)
Total		144	(35)

International career
1907–1914	Ireland	9	(2)
- * Club domestic league appearances and goals

Samuel Young (14 February 1883 – 28 November 1954) was an Irish footballer who played as a winger. Young played club football in Ireland, Scotland and England for Linfield, Airdrie and Portsmouth. Young also played at international level for Ireland, scoring two goals in the 1914 British Home Championship.
