= Aníbal Zapicán Falco =

Uruguayan footballer (1893-1961)

Personal information
- Date of birth: 25 September 1888
- Place of birth: Montevideo, Uruguay
- Date of death: 30 April 1961 (aged 72)
- Place of death: Montevideo, Uruguay
- Position: Defender

Senior career*
Years	Team	Apps	(Gls)
1903–1911	Nacional		

International career
1908–1909	Uruguay	4	(0)
- * Club domestic league appearances and goals

Aníbal Zapicán Falco (25 September 1888 — 30 April 1961) was a Uruguayan footballer who played as a defender for Nacional and Uruguay.

== Career ==
Falco was born in Montevideo on 25 September 1888.

On 4 October 1908, Falco made his debut for Uruguay at the age of 19, playing in a 1–0 win against Argentina. In 1911, Falco retired from football, owing to a problem with his meniscus.

In 1937, Falco was named president of Nacional. On 14 June 1937, under Falco's presidency, Nacional purchased Estadio Gran Parque Central for $150,000.
