= Archie McWhinnie =

Scottish footballer

Personal information
- Full name: Archibald McWhinnie
- Date of birth: 17 July 1926
- Place of birth: Glasgow, Scotland
- Date of death: 21 March 1971 (aged 44)
- Place of death: East Kilbride, Lanarkshire, Scotland
- Position: Wing half

Senior career*
Years	Team	Apps	(Gls)
- Rutherglen Glencairn
1951–1952	Wrexham	2	(0)
1952–1953	Cowdenbeath		
- * Club domestic league appearances and goals

Archibald "Archie" McWhinnie (17 July 1926 – 21 March 1971) was a Scottish professional footballer, who made two appearances in the English football league with Wrexham.

He also played for Scottish clubs Rutherglen Glencairn and Cowdenbeath.
