= Val Harris =

Irish footballer (1884-1963)

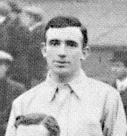
- Harris with Ireland in 1914

Personal information
- Full name: Valentine Harris
- Date of birth: 13 June 1884
- Place of birth: Ringsend, Dublin, Ireland
- Date of death: 9 November 1963 (aged 79)
- Place of death: Dublin, Ireland
- Positions: Midfielder; forward; defender

Youth career
- 1898: Pembroke
- 1899: Emeralds

Senior career*
Years	Team	Apps	(Gls)
1900	Isles of the Sea (Gaelic football)		
1901	Dublin county team (Gaelic football)		
1903–08	Shelbourne		
1908–1914	Everton	190	(1)
1914–1927	Shelbourne		

International career
1906–1914	Ireland	20	(0)
1904–1906	Irish League XI	4	(0)
1925–1926	League of Ireland XI	2	(0)

Managerial career
- 193x–193x: Irish Free State
- 193x–19xx: Shelbourne
- * Club domestic league appearances and goals

Valentine Harris (Irish: Vailintín Ó hEarchaí; 23 June 1884 in Ringsend, Dublin, Ireland – 9 November 1963), commonly referred to as Val Harris, was an Irish footballer who played Gaelic football for the Dublin county team and soccer for, among others Shelbourne, Everton and Ireland. Harris was regarded as one of the finest soccer players of his generation and in 1906 became the first Shelbourne player capped by Ireland. He still remains the club's most capped player. In 1913 he captained the first Ireland team to beat England and in 1914 he was a member of the Ireland team that won the British Home Championship. Harris has been described as an extremely hard player in the mode of Kevin Moran or Paul McGrath and like his Shelbourne, Everton and Ireland teammate, Bill Lacey, he was also very versatile, covering just about every outfield position during his career.

== Playing career ==
=== Early years ===
Harris initially played soccer with junior clubs Pembroke and Emeralds and in 1898 helped Pembroke reach the final of the Leinster Junior Cup. He was also an accomplished Gaelic footballer during his teens, initially joining Terenure Sarsfields before joining, and winning honours at club level with Ringsend GAA team Isles of the Sea. In 1901 he won an All-Ireland medal with the Dublin county team. Harris is one of several prominent Dublin Gaelic footballers who successfully switched codes to soccer; others have included Jack Kirwan, Con Martin, Joseph Ledwidge and Kevin Moran.

=== Shelbourne ===
In 1903 Harris made his debut for Shelbourne in the Leinster Senior League. In May 1904 he had a trial with West Bromwich Albion but then returned to Shelbourne and made his Irish League debut in a 3–1 defeat to Glentoran on 17 September 1904 at Serpentine Avenue, Dublin. Harris stated that as well as offers from West Bromwich Albion, he has also received approaches from Blackburn Rovers, Bury F.C. and Partick Thistle. Harris went on to play in four consecutive Irish Cup finals and in the 1906 final was captain when Shelbourne beat Belfast Celtic 2–0 at Dalymount Park, becoming the first Dublin side to lift the trophy. His teammates during this era included, among others, Joseph Ledwidge and Bill Lacey.

=== Everton ===
In March 1908 Harris moved to Everton for £350, the maximum amount allowed at the time. He made his debut for Everton against Woolwich Arsenal and quickly established himself as the team's regular right-half. During his time at Goodison Park he was noted for his consistency and effectiveness and played in six different positions. With Harris in the team, Everton regularly challenged for top honours, twice finishing as League runners-up (1908–09 and 1911–12) as well as reaching the semi-final stage in the 1910 FA Cup. His teammates at Everton included fellow Irish internationals Billy Scott and Bill Lacey, who had followed Harris from Shelbourne in February 1909. Harris made 190 Football League appearances and scored one goal; he also played a further 14 games and scored a further goal in the FA Cup.

=== Return to Shelbourne ===
After six years at Everton, Harris returned to Shelbourne in August 1914. In 1920 he won the Irish Cup for a second time after both Belfast Celtic and Glentoran were expelled. In 1921 Shelbourne became founder members of the League of Ireland and in 1926 the club won the title. Harris remained a prominent member of the Shelbourne team well passed his fortieth birthday and his second spell at the club saw him play alongside Bill Lacey, Bob Fullam, Ed Brookes and Louis Bookman. During his two spells with Shelbourne, Harris made 71 Irish League appearances, scoring 13 goals, 89 League of Ireland appearances, scoring 6 goals, and a further 36 games and 12 goals in the Irish Cup.

=== International ===
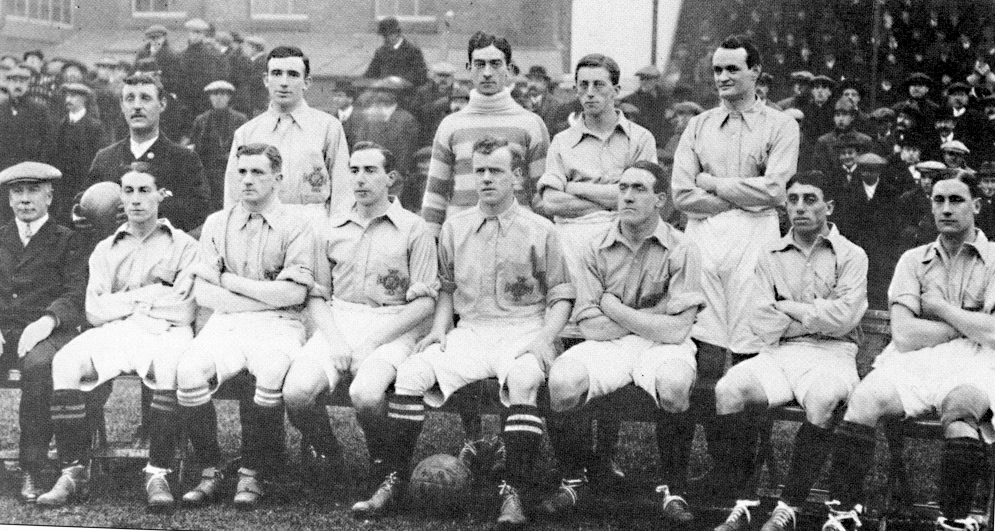
Harris (first player on left of back-row) with Ireland team v Wales during 1914 British Home Championship.

Harris made his debut for Ireland as a centre-forward on 17 February 1906 in a 5–0 defeat to England at the Solitude Ground. His teammates that day included Robert Milne and Jack Kirwan. He was the first Shelbourne player to be capped by Ireland and subsequently won a further six caps while at the club. Despite suffering a number of severe injuries related to his robust style of play, Harris was remarkably consistent in his appearances for Ireland and he featured in a run of thirteen consecutive internationals between 1908 and 1912. On 15 February 1913, Harris captained the Ireland team, that also included Billy Scott and two-goal hero Billy Gillespie, as they beat England for the first time with a 2–1 win at Windsor Park. In 1914 Ireland went a stage further and won the British Home Championship. Harris and Gillespie were joined in the squad by the likes of Patrick O'Connell, Louis Bookman and Bill Lacey.

== Coaching career ==
After retiring as player in 1927, Harris became a coach with both the Irish Free State and Shelbourne. In 1932 Harris took charge of the Irish team as they played the Netherlands. Although the team was chosen by selectors, Harris took charge of training and gave the team talk. Before the game Harris declared Pat O'Callaghan put the tricolour flying high here in the 1928 Olympics and it's up to you lads to see it is still flying high this evening. The words proved inspiring as an Irish team that included Alex Stevenson, Mick O'Brien, Jimmy Kelly and Paddy Moore won 2–0. Harris would later coach and managed Shelbourne as they won the 1939 FAI Cup, their first success in that competition.

== Sources ==
- Tony Matthews (2004). Who's Who of Everton.
- Sean Ryan (1997). The Boys in Green – The FAI International Story.
