= Joseph Ledwidge =

Irish cricketer (1877–1953)

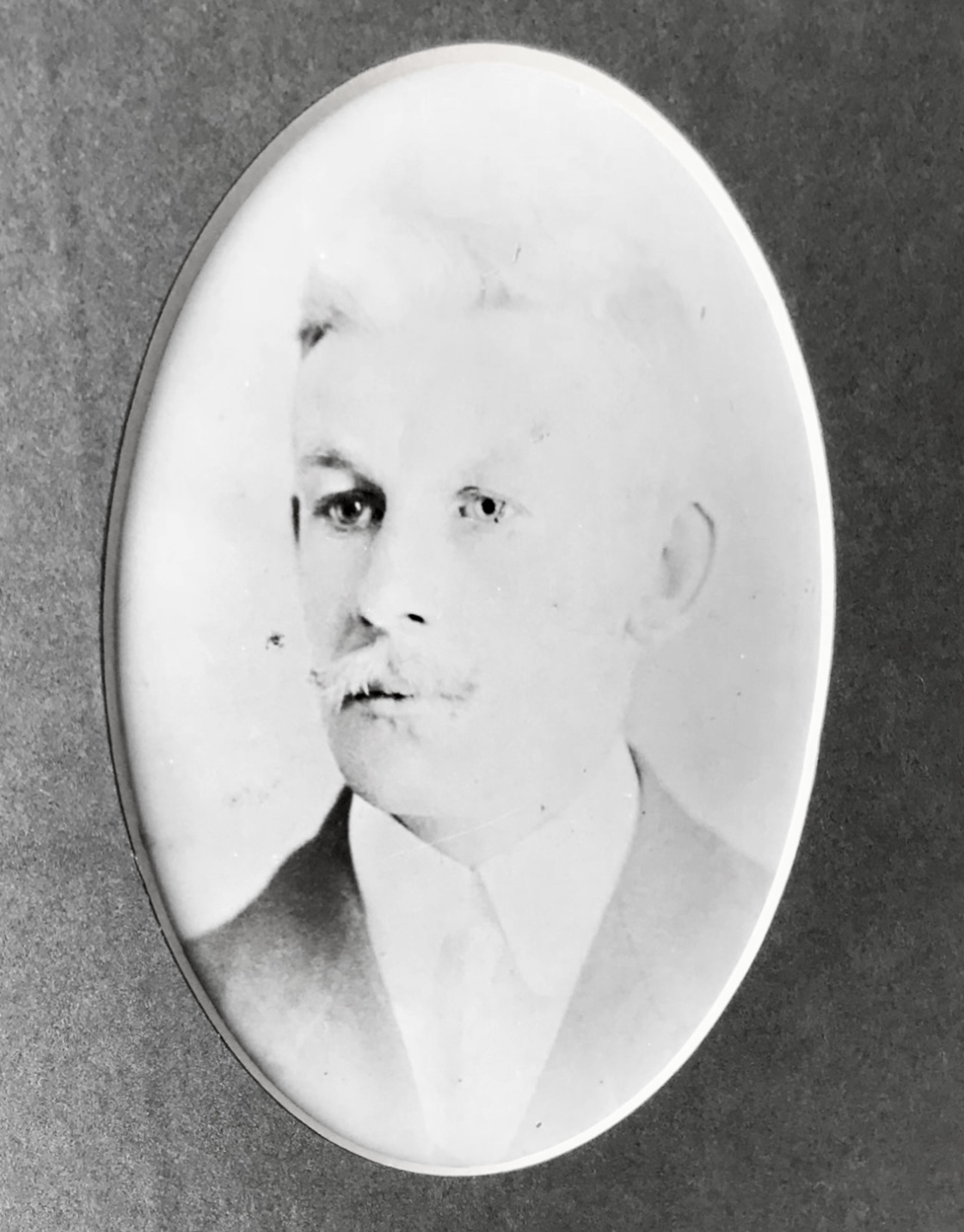
- Portrait of Joseph Ledwidge
- Born: Joseph James Ledwidge; 8 June 1877; Arran Quay, Dublin, Ireland.
- Died: 19 January 1953 (aged 75); Dolphin's Barn, Dublin, Ireland.
- Occupation: Footballer

Joseph James Ledwidge Sr. (8 June 1877 – 19 January 1953) was a Gaelic footballer, an Irish international soccer player and a cricketer. He won two All-Ireland medals playing with the Dublin Geraldines and later played with Shelbourne in the Irish League.

== Early life ==
Ledwidge was born on Arran Quay, Dublin, Ireland to Joseph William Ledwidge, a butcher, and Elizabeth Trulock. He married Molly Owens in 1910.

== Sporting career ==
He had his first successes playing with the Geraldines' selection that won two All-Ireland titles for Dublin in 1898 and 1899.

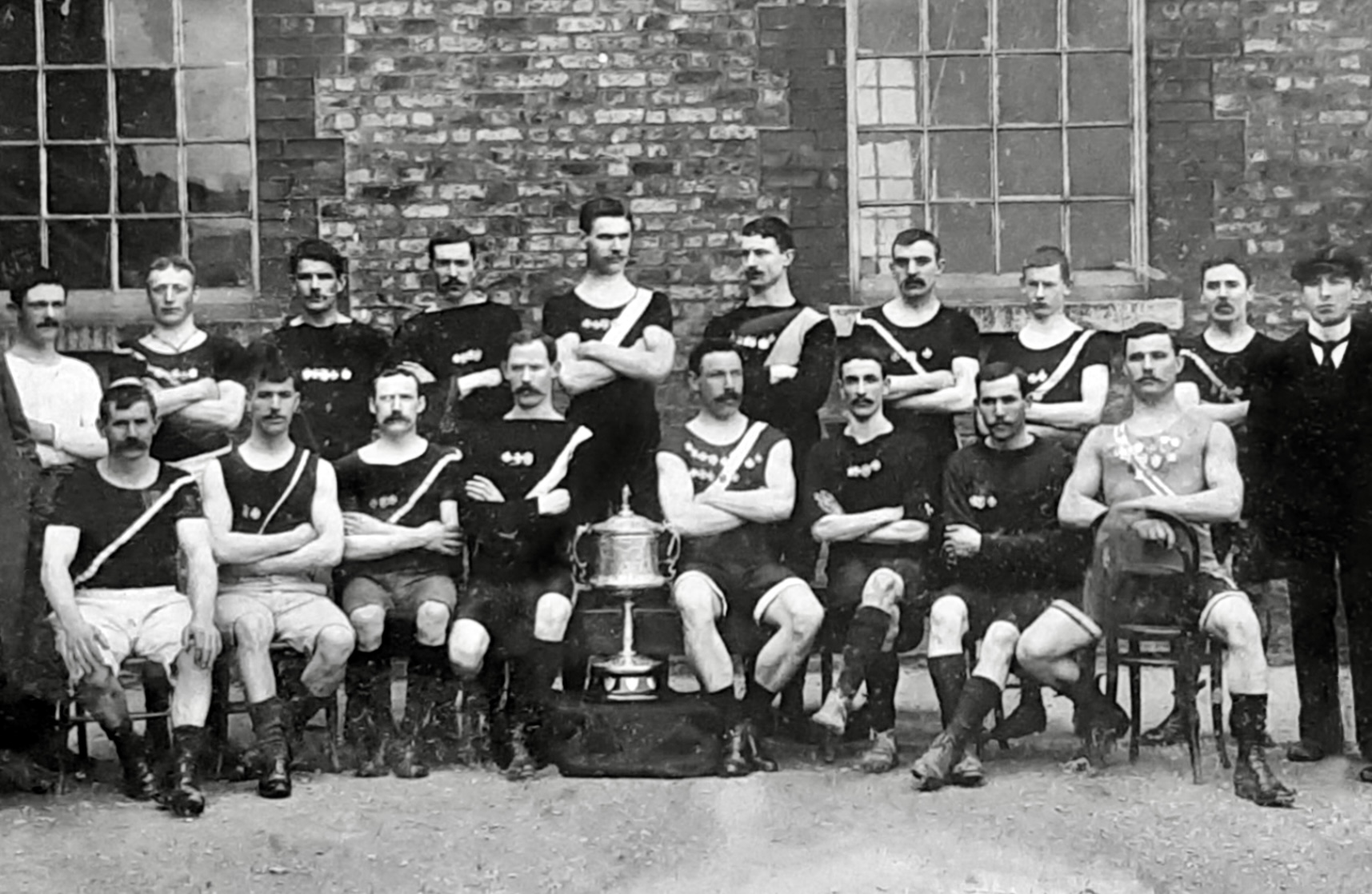
Dublin Geraldines, 1901. Ledwidge is third from the right in the back row.

Ledwidge joined Shelbourne in 1901 when they played in the Leinster Senior League and played 51 times for them in the Irish League after they joined in 1904 until he left Shelbourne in 1909.

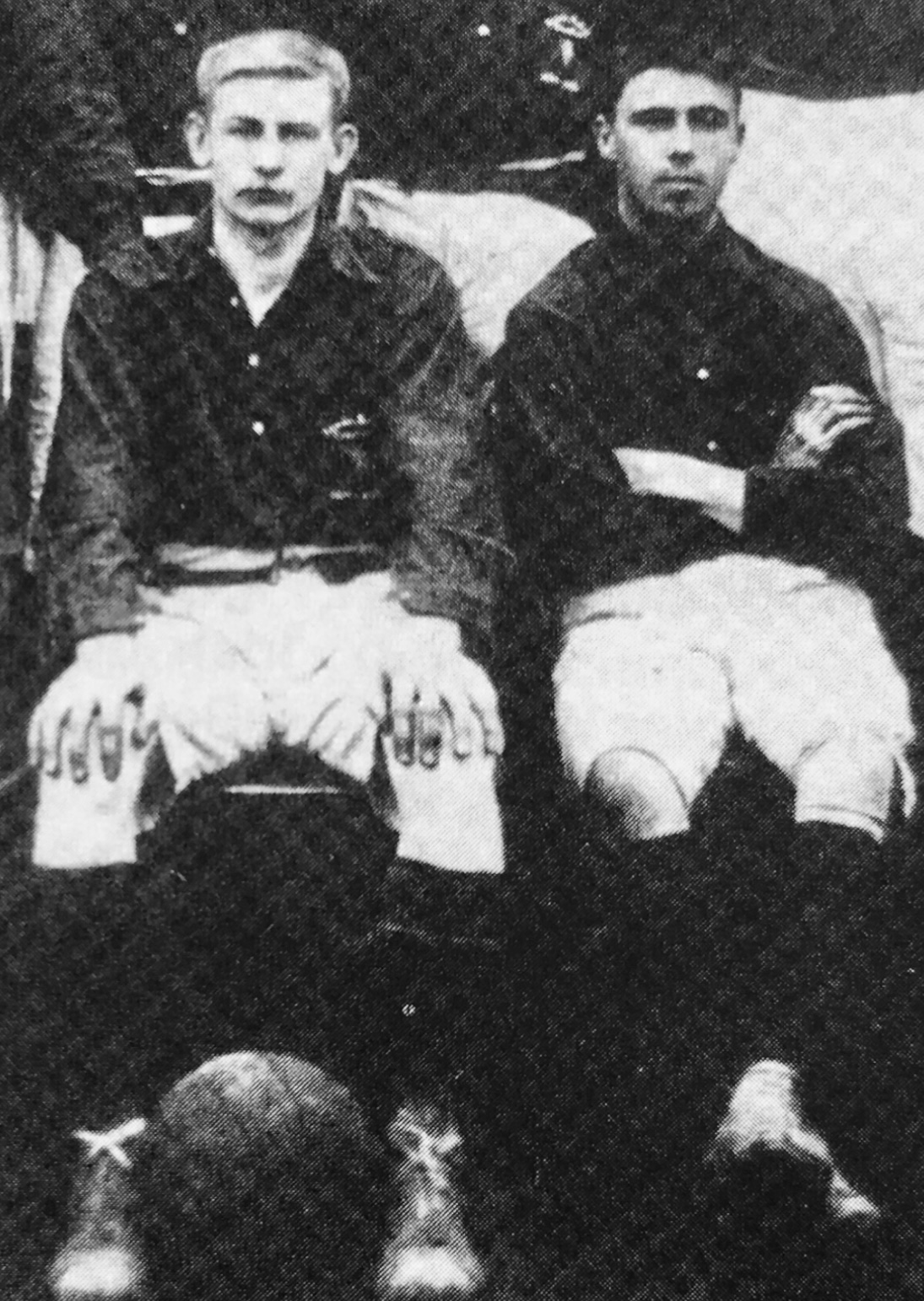
Joe Ledwidge (left) and brother-in-law, Jack Owens.

He played for Shelbourne in their historic Irish Cup final win over Belfast Celtic in 1906 as well the cup final defeat to Distillery in 1905 and the cup final replay defeats to Cliftonville and Bohemians in 1907 and 1908. He was the first man to win both a GAA All-Ireland and an IFA cup-winner's medal.

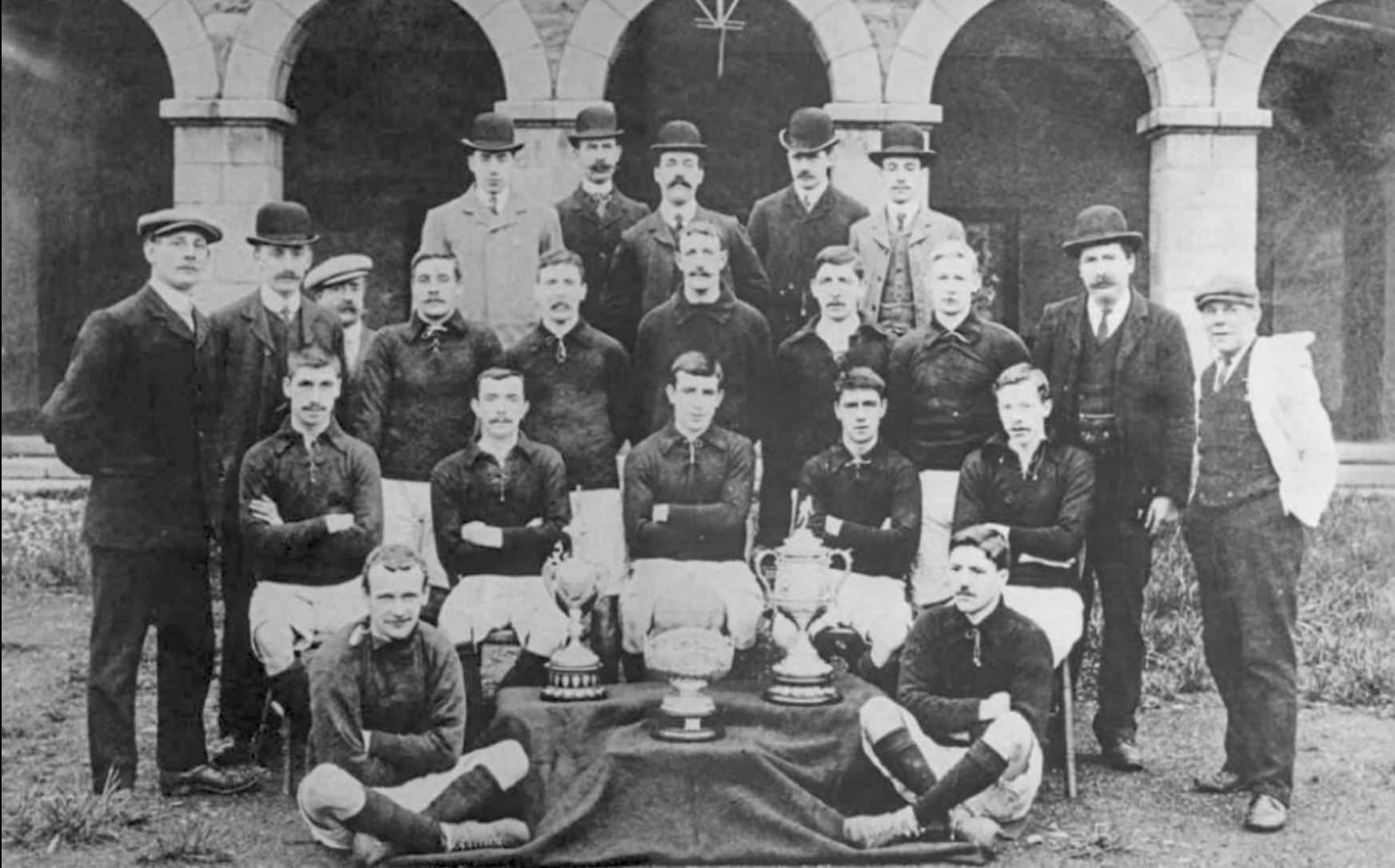
Shelbourne F.C at Dalymount Park, 28 April 1906. Ledwidge is third from the right in the middle row. Ledwidge’s brothers-in-law, James and John Owens are featured as well as Val Harris.

Ledwidge won an inter-league cap for the Irish League against the Football League in Manchester during the 1905-06 season. He also played soccer for St. James's Gate F.C.

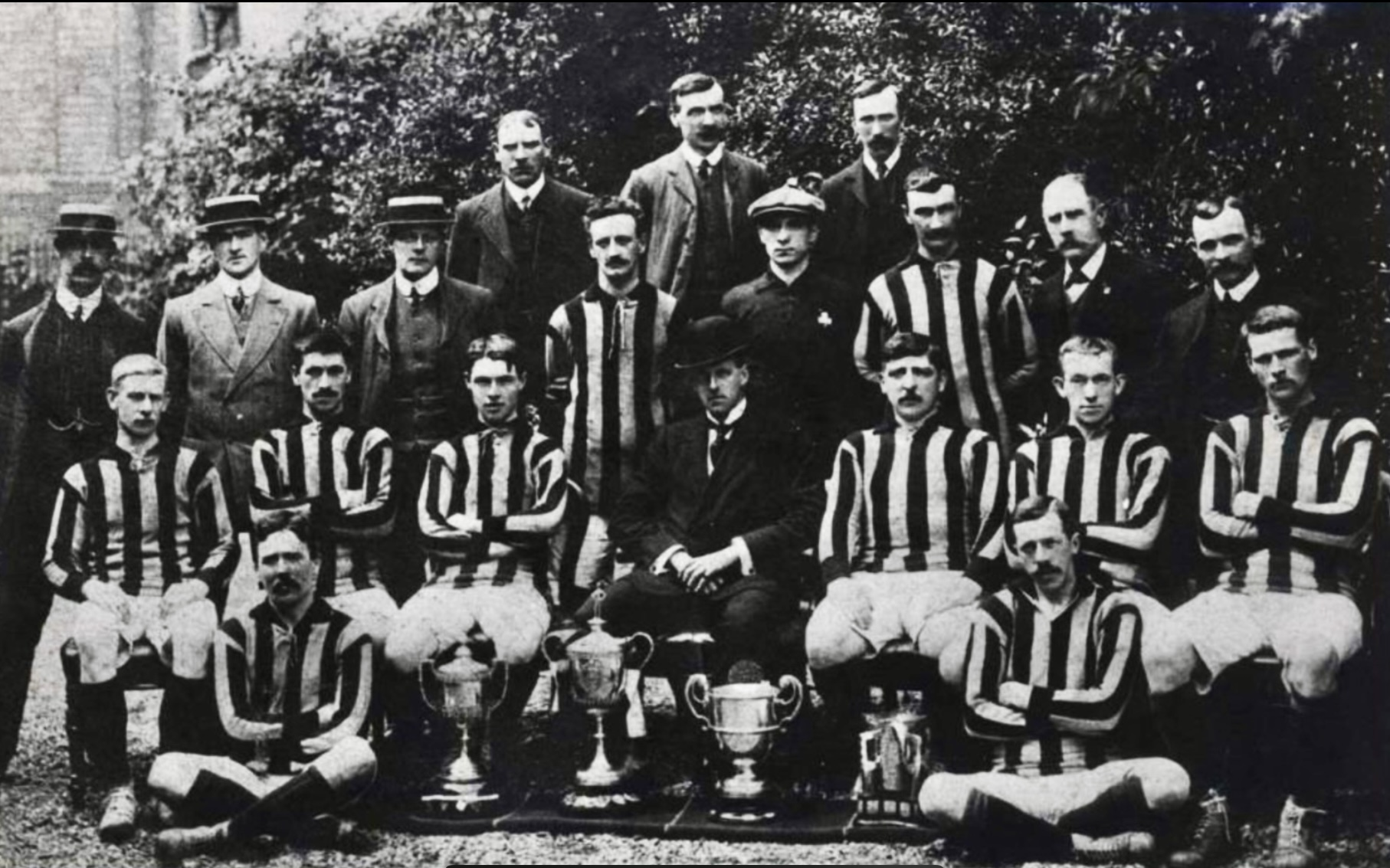
St. James’ Gate F.C, 1910. Ledwidge is first from the left in the front row.

He got his first international caps playing for Ireland against Scotland and Wales in the 1905-06 British Home Championship.

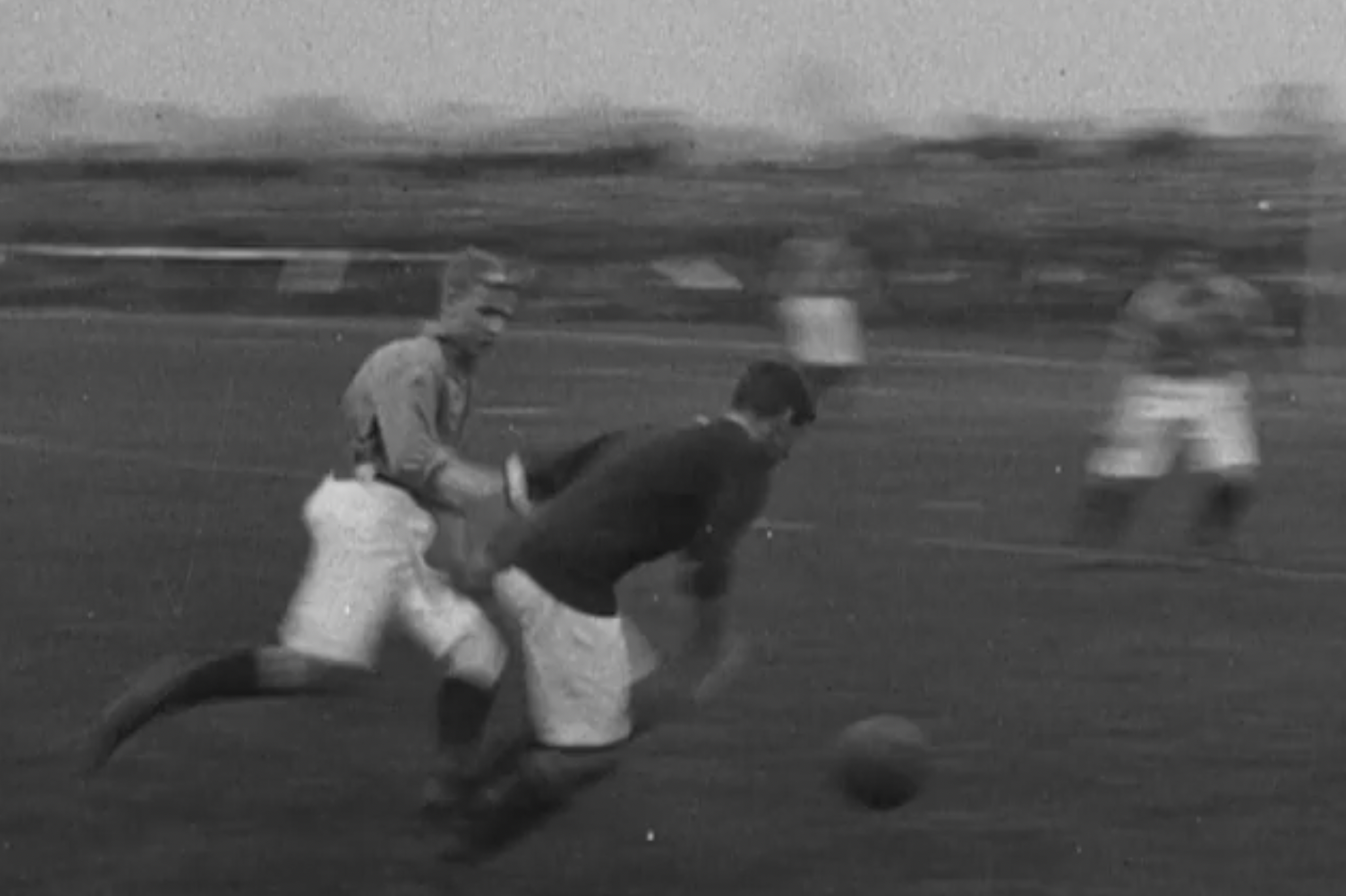
Joseph Ledwidge (left) playing against Wales in the British Home Championship, 2 April 1906.

== Post-sporting life ==
After his sporting career, he enlisted in the British army during World War One, and was a private in the 1st Battalion of the Royal Irish Fusiliers as well as a sapper in the Royal Engineers, seeing action in France at the Battle of Passchendaele. While serving in the latter, he received the Distinguished Conduct Medal for conspicuous gallantry.

Ledwidge was a great-great nephew of historian Edward Ledwich and 2nd cousin of notable Irish anatomist and surgeon Thomas Hawkesworth Ledwich.

He worked for the Ordnance Survey office and later for the Land Commission before retiring.

Joseph died in Dublin on 19 January 1953 and is buried in Mount Jerome Cemetery.
