= Joe Donnachie =

Scottish footballer and manager

Personal information
- Full name: Joseph Donnachie
- Date of birth: 18 December 1882
- Place of birth: Kilwinning, Scotland
- Date of death: 31 December 1966 (aged 84)
- Place of death: Chester, England
- Position: Outside forward

Senior career*
Years	Team	Apps	(Gls)
- Rutherglen Glencairn
1903–1905	Morton	2	(0)
1904–1905	→ Albion Rovers (loan)	15	(3)
1905–1906	Newcastle United	2	(0)
1906–1908	Everton	40	(0)
1908–1914	Oldham Athletic	216	(19)
1919	Rangers	5	(0)
1919–1920	Everton	16	(0)
1920–1921	Blackpool	19	(1)
1921–1924	Chester City		

International career
1913–1914	Scotland	3	(1)
- * Club domestic league appearances and goals

Joseph Donnachie (18 December 1882 – 31 December 1966) was a Scottish professional footballer. An outside left or outside right, he played in the Football League for Newcastle United, Everton, Oldham Athletic and Blackpool.

== Club career ==
He began his career in his native Scotland with newly formed Rutherglen Glencairn in the late 19th century. He signed for Morton, and had a loan stint with Albion Rovers. In 1905, aged 20, he moved south to join Newcastle United. He made just two League appearances for the Magpies before joining Everton the following February. In three years at Goodison Park he made forty League appearances.

In 1908 he joined Oldham Athletic, with whom he spent the bulk of his career. In six years he made 216 League appearances. He also scored his first League goal for the Latics, and went on to score nineteen in total.

He had a short spell back in Scotland with Rangers, making five Scottish Football League appearances (he was one of several players of the Catholic faith to feature for the club up to that time, after which an unwritten rule was introduced at the club which persisted for several decades) then returned to Everton in 1919, for whom he made a further sixteen League appearances. The following year he moved a short distance up the west coast to sign with Blackpool. In nineteen League appearances with the Seasiders he scored one goal.

Donnachie finished his career with Chester City as player-manager.

== International career ==
Donnachie made three appearances for the Scotland national team, all during his spell with Oldham Athletic. He scored one goal, in a 1–1 draw with Ireland on 14 March 1914.

== Personal life ==
Donnachie's son, also called Joe, was also a footballer, playing for Everton, Bolton Wanderers and Chester City. He was killed in an aircraft accident in 1944.
