= Ireland national football team (1882–1950) =

Former national association football teams

Ireland
1882–1950
- Association: Irish Football Association
- Most caps: Elisha Scott (31)
- Top scorer: Billy Gillespie (13)
- Home stadium: Windsor Park; Lansdowne Road; Solitude; Ulster Cricket Ground; Celtic Park, Belfast
- FIFA code: EIR
First colours

First international
- Ireland 0–13 England (Belfast, Ireland; 18 February 1882)

Last international
- Wales 0–0 Ireland (Wrexham, Wales; 8 March 1950)

Biggest win
- Ireland 7–0 Wales (Belfast, Ireland; 1 February 1930)

Biggest defeat
- Ireland 0–13 England (Belfast, Ireland; 18 February 1882)

The Ireland national football team (Irish: Foireann peile náisiúnta na hÉireann) represented the island of Ireland in association football from 1882 until 1950. It was organised by the Irish Football Association (IFA), and is the fourth oldest international team in the world. It mainly played in the British Home Championship against England, Scotland and Wales. Though often vying with Wales to avoid the wooden spoon, Ireland won the Championship in 1914, and shared it with England and Scotland in 1903.

After the partition of Ireland in the 1920s, although the IFA's administration of club football was restricted to Northern Ireland, the IFA national team continued to select players from the whole of Ireland until 1950, and did not adopt the name "Northern Ireland" until 1954 in FIFA competition, and the 1970s in the British Home Championship. (Note: The last match played as Ireland was 1978 versus Scotland, however, apart from this match, all British Championship matches had been played as "Northern Ireland" since the 1973–74 tournament. In the 1972–73 tournament, the first two matches were played as "Ireland" and the third as "Northern Ireland". In the 1971–72 tournament, the first was played as "Ireland" and the second and third as "Northern Ireland". 1970–71 was the last tournament in which all matches were played under the name "Ireland".) In 1924, a separate international team, organised by the Football Association of Ireland, fielded a team called Ireland, which now represents the Republic of Ireland.

== History ==
=== 1800s ===
On 18 February 1882, two years after the founding of the Irish FA, Ireland made their international debut against England, losing 0–13 in a friendly played at Bloomfield Park in Belfast, becoming the fourth international side ever to take the field. This result remains the record win for England and the record defeat for an Ireland team. The Irish line-up that day included Samuel Johnston, who at the age of 15 years and 154 days became the youngest international debutant, which was a record until Aníbal Zapicán Falco played for Uruguay in 1908 at the age of 15 years and nine days. On 25 February 1882 Ireland played their second international against Wales at the Racecourse Ground, Wrexham and an equaliser from Johnston became Ireland's first ever goal, although Ireland went on to lose 1–7, the goal also saw Johnston became the youngest ever international goalscorer.

In 1884 Ireland competed in the inaugural British Home Championship and lost all three games. Ireland did not win their first game until 13 March 1887, a 4–1 win over Wales in Belfast. Between their debut and this game, they had a run of 14 defeats and 1 draw, the longest run without a win in the 19th century. Despite the end of this run, heavy defeats continued to blight Ireland's record, including 3 March 1888 when they lost 0–11 to Wales, and on 23 February 1901 when they lost 0–11 to Scotland. These losses, together with the initial loss to England still constitute the record wins held by each of the other home nation teams.

However, there were some brighter moments: on 7 February 1891 an Ireland team featuring Jack Reynolds and four-goal hero Olphert Stanfield defeated Wales 7–2, providing Ireland with their second win. Reynolds international performances attracted the interest of West Bromwich Albion who signed him in March 1891, however it was later discovered that Reynolds was actually English. On 3 March 1894 at the Solitude Ground in Belfast, after thirteen attempts Ireland finally avoided defeat to England, the team that included Fred Spiksley and Reynolds, who had since switched allegiances, Ireland gained a 2–2 draw. Goals from Stanfield and W.K. Gibson inspired Ireland to come back from 2–0 down to gain a 2–2 draw.

Lacking the strength in depth enjoyed by England and Scotland, Irish internationals of this era started younger and their careers lasted longer than their English or Scottish contemporaries. As a result, Ireland fielded both the youngest and oldest national teams during the 19th century. Samuel Johnston had led the way in the early 1880s. Then on 27 February 1886 Shaw Gillespie, at the age of 18, became the youngest goalkeeper of the 19th century. Both Olphert Stanfield and W.K. Gibson were only 17 when they made their debuts. Another 17-year-old debutant was future Worcestershire cricketer, George Gaukrodger. In Johnston, Gibson and Gaukrodger, Ireland also had three of the four youngest goalscorers in the 19th century. Stanfield would go on to win 30 caps for Ireland, making him the most capped international of the century.

=== British champions ===
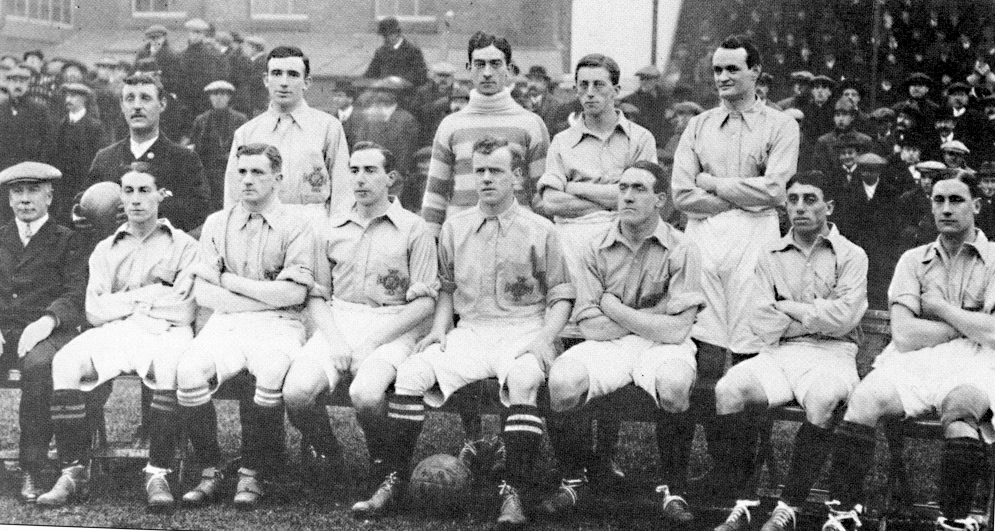
Ireland v Wales during 1913–14 British Home Championship Back(l-r):Val Harris, Fred McKee, Davy Rollo, Patrick O'Connell Front(l-r): Ted Seymour, Sam Young, Billy Gillespie, Alex Craig, Bill Lacey, Louis Bookman, Bill McConnell

Ireland's greatest success on the football field came when they won the 1913–14 British Home Championship. However the foundations for that success had been laid over a decade earlier when Ireland had pioneered the use of national team coaches. The first time in the history of modern football that a national team had a coach was on 20 February 1897 when Billy Crone was in charge of the Ireland team that lost 6–0 to England, again for the wins against Wales on 19 February 1898, on 4 March 1899, Ireland was coached by Hugh McAteer, and on 24 February 1900 Robert Torrans coached Ireland for the game against Wales. In 1914 McAteer would return to coach Ireland to their greatest success.

In 1899 the IFA also changed its rules governing the selection of non-resident players. Before then the Ireland team selected its players exclusively from the Irish League, in particular the four Belfast-based clubs, Cliftonville, Distillery, Glentoran and Linfield. On 4 March 1899 for the game against Wales, McAteer included four Irish players based in England. The change in policy produced dividends as Ireland won 1–0. Three weeks later, on 25 March one of these four players, Archie Goodall, aged 34 years and 279 days, became the oldest player to score at international level during the 19th century when he scored in a 1–9 defeat to Scotland. Goodall remained a regular at centre-half for Ireland until he was almost 40. On 28 March 1903, aged 38 years and 283 days, he scored the opening goal in a 2–0 win against Wales and became the oldest goalscorer in Ireland's history. The goal also helped an Ireland team, that also included Jack Kirwan, Billy Scott, Billy McCracken and Robert Milne, clinch a share in the 1902–03 British Home Championship. Until then the competition had been monopolised by England and Scotland. However, in 1903, before goal difference was applied, Ireland forced a three way share. Despite losing their opening game 0–4 to England, the Irish then beat Scotland for the first time with a 2–0 win at Celtic Park.

On 15 February 1913, with a team captained by Val Harris and including Billy Scott and two-goal hero Billy Gillespie, Ireland beat England for the first time with a 2–1 win at Windsor Park. In 1914 Ireland went a stage further and won the championship outright. Harris and Gillespie were joined in the squad by among others, Patrick O'Connell and Bill Lacey. Gillespie scored twice as Ireland beat Wales 2–1 away, Ireland then beat England 3–0 at Ayresome Park, Middlesbrough with Lacey grabbing two of the goals. They clinched the title following a 1–1 home draw with Scotland in what would be their last match until the end of the First World War.

=== Inter-war years ===
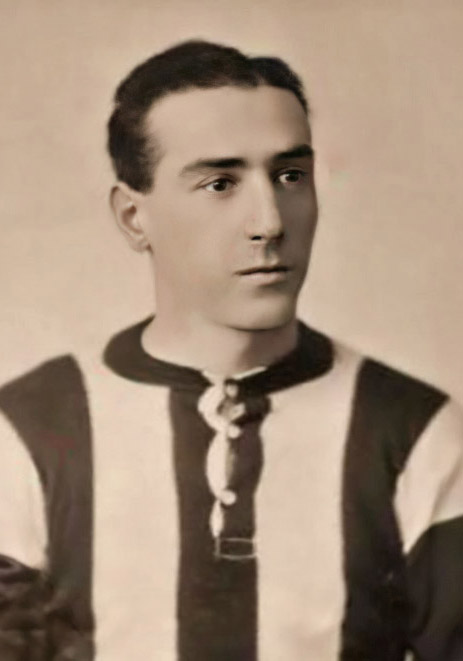
Billy Gillespie held the international scoring record for sixty years.

Following the end of hostilities, the British Home Championship resumed in October 1919, opening with Ireland taking on England at Windsor Park. The championship winning team had since broken up, and in their first game, Ireland fielded eight debutants, and despite only losing one game in the first post war competition, they finished the tournament in last place.

Ireland never refound the form of their 1914 winning season, and only managed two second places in the following twenty years. However they did have a number of excellent match performance including beating England 2–1 at Windsor Park on 10 October 1923 with a team featuring Tom Farquharson, Sam Irving, Bobby Irvine and Billy Gillespie. During the 1920s, Billy Gillespie set the Irish FAs record of thirteen goals in an international career, of which seven of these came at the expense of England. Gillespie's record was eventually equalled by Colin Clarke in 1992 and broken by David Healy in 2004, thus holding the record for nearly 80 years.

Throughout Ireland's formative years they exclusively played against England, Scotland and Wales, both in friendlies and in the British Home Championship. However, in the 1920s there were occasions when Ireland played other teams, including France, Norway and South Africa, for various reasons, such as the number of amateur players involved, the status of these internationals has been disputed.

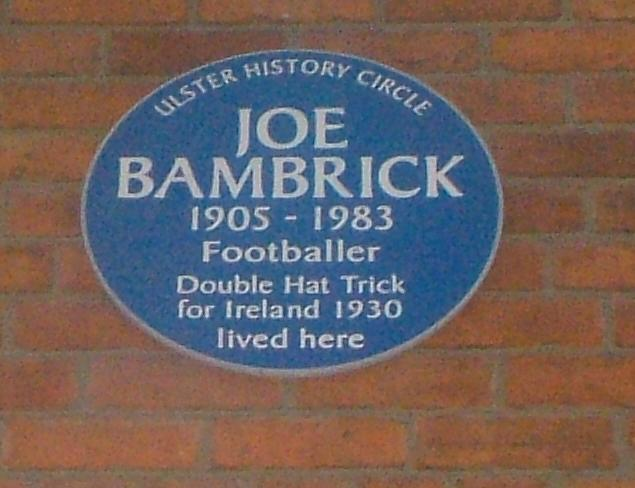
Blue plaque noting six goal hero Bambrick's home in Belfast

On 10 October 1927 Gillespie and Irving were joined by Elisha Scott as they defeated England 2–0 at Windsor Park, in the following match a defeat by Wales in Belfast put the championship beyond reach, however on 25 February 1928 an inspired goalkeeping performance from Scott helped Ireland defeat Scotland 1–0, their first win against the Scots in eighteen years, gaining the side their best season finish since 1914.

On 2 February 1930 Ireland beat Wales 7–0 with Joe Bambrick, playing at his home club ground scoring six of the seven goals. This remains the team's record win to this day, and Bambrick's six goals was the highest tally by any player in a single match in the history of the competition, and remains unequaled to this very day.

However Ireland spent the remainder of the decade in the bottom half of the table, only managing to avoid last place on three occasions. Following war breaking out in Europe, the British home championship was again suspended with Ireland finishing the 1938–39 competition where they had spent most of the last two decades, at the bottom of the table, having lost all their games.

==== Irish FA v FA of Ireland ====
In 1920 Ireland was partitioned into Northern Ireland and Southern Ireland. In 1922, the south of Ireland gained independence as the Irish Free State, later to become Republic of Ireland. Amid these political upheavals, a rival football association, the Football Association of Ireland (the FAI), emerged in Dublin in 1921 and organised a separate league and later a national team. In 1923, during a period when the home nations had disaffiliated from the governing body, the FAI was recognised by FIFA as the governing body of the Irish Free State on the condition that it changed its name to the Football Association of the Irish Free State. At the same time, the IFA continued to organise its national team on an all-Ireland basis, regularly calling up Free State players. During this era at least one Northerner, Harry Chatton, also played for the Irish Free State and from 1936, the FAI began to organise their own all–Ireland team. Both teams now competed as Ireland and during this era at least 39 dual internationals were selected to represent both teams. In an era when national teams played only a few games a year, it was rare for professional players to turn down an opportunity to play at international level. Between 1928 and 1946 the IFA were not affiliated to FIFA and the two Ireland teams co-existed, never competing in the same competition. Only in 1949, they both would participate in the qualifying tournament for the 1950 World Cup.

=== End of the era ===
During the Second World War all home internationals were suspended, however, during this period Ireland played an unofficial match against a combined services eleven, which was effectively a Great Britain side containing Matt Busby, Stanley Matthews, Tommy Lawton and Stan Mortensen. The game was a high scoring affair with Ireland losing 4–8, with all four Ireland goals coming from the future manager Peter Doherty. The performance of Doherty was such that the match commentator, Maurice Edelston, stated "He was almost a one-man team – and if Ireland had two Dohertys that day, I shudder to think what might have happened".

In 1946, when the Home Nations resumed official internationals, the IFA-FAI split was highlighted as England played both teams in the same week. The English FA requested each association to select only players from its jurisdiction, "quoting the International Federation rule to that effect". The FAI complied, but not the IFA, and two players from the 2–7 defeat in Belfast on 28 September played again in the 0–1 defeat in Dublin on 30 September. On 27 November, seven players born in the 26 counties, including Johnny Carey, Peter Farrell and Con Martin, played in the IFA side's 0–0 draw with Scotland. The draw helped the team finish as runners-up in the 1946–47 British Home Championship. From then until the 1949–50 season the IFA regularly selected five to seven players born in the Free State and were rewarded with some respectable results, including a 2–0 win against Scotland on 4 October 1947 and a 2–2 draw with England at Goodison Park on 5 November the same year.

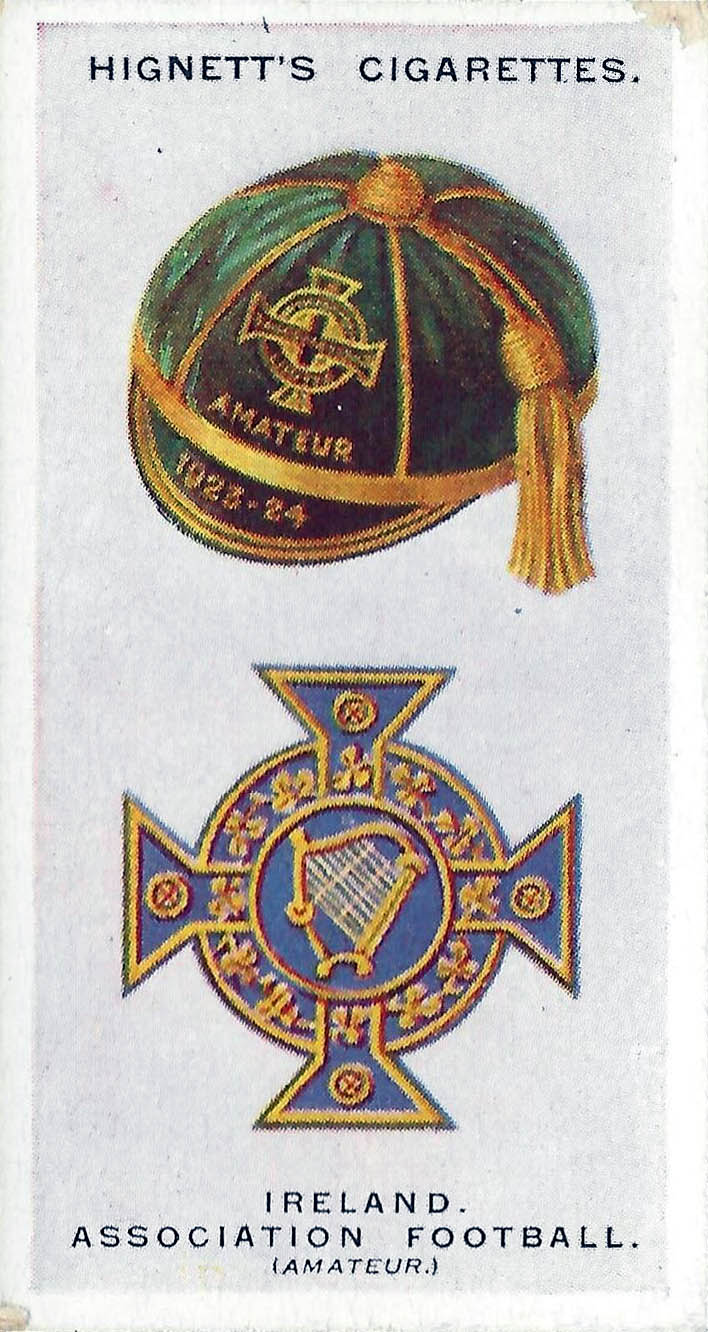
Cigarette card issued by Hignett Bros. & Co. in 1924, displaying the IFA cap and logo

The Irish FA, along with the other Home Nations, rejoined FIFA to compete in the World Cup; the 1949–50 British Home Championship was used as the qualifying group. Ireland hosted the first ever World Cup qualifier in which a home nation side competed, losing 2–8 to Scotland in Belfast, and eventually finishing bottom of the group only managing to take a point, away to Wales. During the match against Wales at the Racecourse Ground, Wrexham, the IFA fielded an all-Ireland team for the last time. The team included four players – Tom Aherne, Reg Ryan, Davy Walsh and the captain Con Martin – who were born in the Irish Free State, and all four of whom had previously played for the FAI international team in their qualifiers and as a result had played for two different associations in the same FIFA World Cup tournament.

The FAI took steps to prevent players from what was now the Republic of Ireland turning out for the IFA's Ireland team. All UK-based players from the Republic were pressured to sign an undertaking not to play for the IFA. Jackie Carey was the last to comply, in April 1950. Rule 35(b) of the FAI articles provided that players based in the Republic would be denied clearance certificates for transfers abroad unless they gave a similar undertaking. The IFA complained to FIFA; in April 1951, FIFA replied that the FAI rule 35(b) was contrary to its regulations, but also that the IFA team could not select "citizens of Eire". An exception was for British Home Championship games, as a 1923 IFAB agreement at Liverpool prevented FIFA intervention in relations between the four Home Nations. However, the exception would only apply "if the F.A. of Ireland do not object", and was never availed of.

IFA and FAI teams both continued to compete as Ireland. At FIFA's 1953 congress, its Rule 3 was amended so that an international team must use "that title ... recognised politically and geographically of the countries or territories". The FAI initially claimed Rule 3 gave them the right to the name Ireland (see names of the Irish state), but FIFA subsequently ruled neither team could be referred to as Ireland, decreeing that the FAI team be officially designated as the Republic of Ireland, while the IFA team was to become Northern Ireland. The IFA objected and in 1954 was permitted to continue using the name Ireland in Home Internationals, based on the 1923 agreement. This practice was discontinued in the late 1970s.

== Home grounds ==
Up until 1899 Ireland played all their home internationals in Belfast, with their first international being played at Bloomfield. Subsequent home games during the 1880s were played at the Ulster Cricket Ground, also known as Ballynafeigh Park, the home of Ulster F.C. During the 1890s the Solitude Ground, the home stadium of Cliftonville, hosted 11 home internationals. In the early 20th century occasional internationals were also played at Grosvenor Park, the then home of Distillery, and the Balmoral Showgrounds.

On 17 March 1900, Saint Patrick's Day, Ireland played their first game in Dublin, losing 0–2 at Lansdowne Road to England. On 26 March 1904 Ireland played their first game at Dalymount Park in north Dublin, a 1–1 draw with Scotland. Between 1904 and 1913 Dalymount hosted at least one Irish international in the years when Ireland had more than one home match. The other games were played at Windsor Park, completed in 1905. After the partition of Ireland, all subsequent home internationals were played in Belfast, mainly at Windsor Park but occasionally at Celtic Park, the home of Belfast Celtic.

== Team colours and emblems ==
Usual	Away to Scotland
Early Ireland colours

From the beginning Ireland wore a variety of colours, including green, white and blue. The first colours were "royal blue jerseys and hose and white knickers". St. Patrick's blue, however, emerged as the established colour from before the First World War until September 1931. Blue has been a national colour of Ireland since the Norman era and has been used by several other Irish sports teams, including Dublin GAA, Leinster Rugby and Dublin City. In 1931 the shirts were changed to green, the colour still worn by the modern Northern Ireland team. The official reason given for the change was to avoid a clash with Scotland, who also wore blue.

Ireland's initial logo was a stylised Celtic cross with a harp in the centre, which in a modern form is used by the current team, however this had been replaced in the 1930s until the 1950s with a Shamrock badge. This change occurred at a time when the IFA and the FAI were both using the Ireland name, and at this time the shamrock was also being worn by the FAI's national side.

== Team selection ==
See Category:Pre-1950 IFA men's international footballers

Selection was the responsibility of a committee, with no individual manager in the modern sense. Coaches were appointed on a match by match basis, among them Billy Crone (1897), Hugh McAteer (1898, 1899, 1914) and Robert Torrans (1900).

== Competitive record ==
=== World Cup record ===
During the preparations for the 1928 Olympic Football Tournament, FIFA ruled that all its member associations must provide "broken-time" payments to cover the expenses of players from the country who participated. In response to what they considered to be unacceptable interference, the football associations of Scotland, England, Ireland and Wales held a meeting at which they agreed to resign from FIFA. As a result, Ireland did not compete in the first three World Cup competitions.

FIFA World Cup record									FIFA World Cup qualification record					
Year	Round	Position	Pld	W	D*	L	GF	GA	Pld	W	D	L	GF	GA
(Uruguay) 1930	did not enter								did not enter					
(Italy) 1934	did not enter								did not enter					
(France) 1938	did not enter								did not enter					
(Brazil) 1950	did not qualify								3	0	1	2	4	17
Total	–	0/4	0	0	0	0	0	0	3	0	1	2	4	17

== Honours ==
=== Regional ===
- British Home Championship
  - Champions (2)
    - Outright winners (1): 1914
    - Shared (1): 1903

== Player records ==
As of 8 March 1950.

=== Most capped players ===
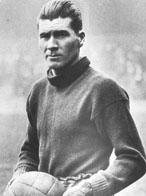
Elisha Scott is Ireland's most capped player at 31 capps.

Rank	Player	Caps	Goals	Career
1	Elisha Scott	31	0	1920–1936
2	Olphert Stanfield	30	11	1887–1897
3	Robert Milne	27	2	1894–1906
4	Samuel Torrans	26	1	1889–1901
5	Billy Gillespie	25	13	1913–1930
5	Billy Scott	25	0	1903–1913
7	Jack Peden	24	7	1887–1899
8	Jack Jones	23	0	1930–1937
8	Bill Lacey	23	1	1927–1930
10	Johnny Darling	22	1	1897–1912

=== Top goalscorers ===
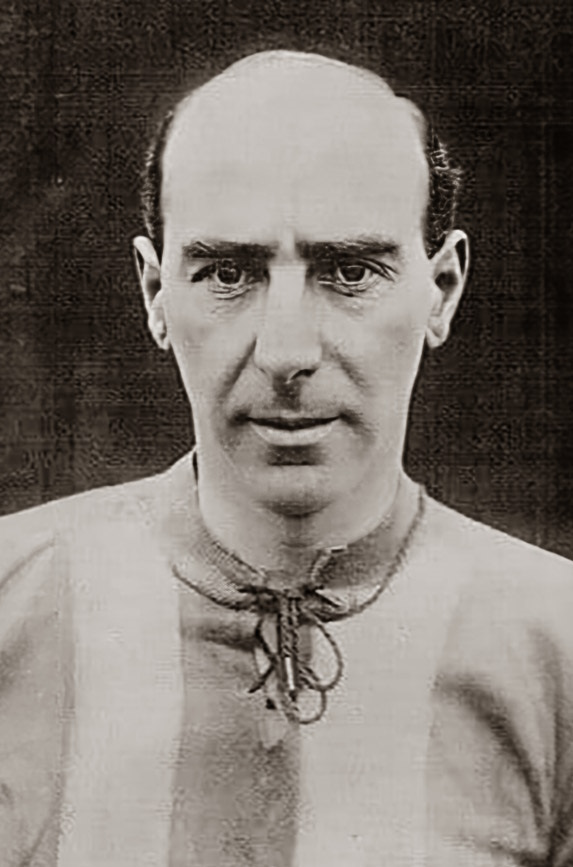
Billy Gillespie is Ireland's all-time record goalscorer at 13 goals.

Rank	Player	Goals	Caps	Ratio	Career
1	Billy Gillespie	13	25	0.52	1913–1930
2	Joe Bambrick	12	11	1.09	1928–1938
3	Olphert Stanfield	11	30	0.37	1887–1897
4	Davy Walsh	7	11	0.64	1946–1950
4	Jack Peden	7	24	0.29	1887–1899
6	Harold Sloan	5	8	0.63	1903–1909
6	Alex Stevenson	5	19	0.26	1933–1947
8	Jimmy Dunne	4	7	0.43	1928–1932
8	William Boyd Dalton	4	11	0.36	1888–1894
8	Jimmy Kelly	4	11	0.36	1931–1936
8	George Gaffikin	4	15	0.27	1890–1895

== See also ==
- List of dual Irish international footballers
- Shamrock Rovers XI vs Brazil: an exhibition match in 1973 between Brazil and a cross-border team of Irish internationals.
