= List of Liverpool F.C. players (1–24 appearances) =

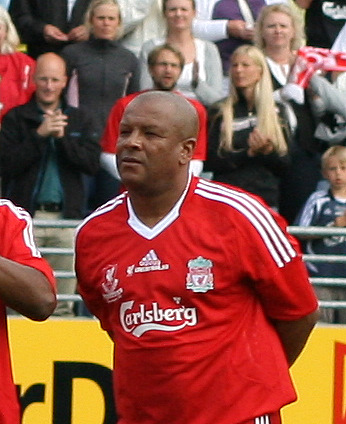
Howard Gayle, who made five appearances for Liverpool during his career.

Liverpool Football Club is an English association football club based in Liverpool, Merseyside. The club was formed in 1892 following a disagreement between the board of Everton and club president John Houlding, who owned the club's ground, Anfield. The disagreement between the two parties over rent resulted in Everton moving to Goodison Park from Anfield, which left Houlding with an empty stadium. Thus, he founded Liverpool F.C. to play in the empty stadium. Liverpool won the First Division title for the first time in 1901; since then, the club has won a further 19 league titles, along with eight FA Cups and ten League Cups. They have also been crowned champions of European football on six occasions, winning the European Cup/UEFA Champions League in 1977, 1978, 1981, 1984, 2005 and 2019. The club was one of 22 members of the Premier League when it was formed in 1992. They experienced the most successful period in their history under the management of Bob Paisley, who guided the team to 21 trophies in nine seasons.

Since Liverpool's first competitive match, more than 700 players have made a competitive first-team appearance for the club. Many of these players spent only a short period of their career at Liverpool before seeking opportunities with other teams; some had their careers cut short by injury, while others left for other reasons. The First and Second World Wars also disrupted the careers of footballers across the United Kingdom. Keith Burkinshaw only played one match for Liverpool but went on to have a successful managerial career at Tottenham Hotspur, where he won the FA Cup twice. Gordon Wallace, who made 22 appearances for the club, was the scorer of Liverpool's first goal in European competition. He scored the first goal in a 6–0 win over KR Reykjavik in the 1964–65 European Cup. Roy Evans made 11 appearances during his Liverpool career, and later managed the club from 1994 to 1998. The only trophy won during his tenure was the League Cup in 1995.

376 players have played fewer than 25 competitive matches for the club. Six former players – John Miller, John Curran, William Watkinson, Avi Cohen, Torben Piechnik and Sebastián Coates – each made 24 appearances during their spell at Liverpool.

== Players ==
- Appearances and goals are for first-team competitive matches only, including Premier League, Football League, FA Cup, EFL Cup, FA Charity/Community Shield, European Cup/UEFA Champions League, UEFA Cup/Europa League, UEFA Cup Winners' Cup, Inter-Cities Fairs Cup, UEFA Super Cup and FIFA Club World Cup matches; wartime matches are regarded as unofficial and are excluded, as are matches from the abandoned 1939–40 season.
- Players are listed according to the date of their first-team debut for the club.
- Positions are listed according to the tactical formations that were employed at the time. Thus, the change in the names of defensive and midfield reflects the tactical evolution that occurred from the 1960s onwards.
- Statistics correct as of 8 November 2026.

Table headers

- Nationality – If a player played international football, the country/countries he played for are shown. Otherwise, the player's nationality is given as their country of birth
- Liverpool career – The year of the player's first appearance for Liverpool to the year of his last appearance.
- Starts – The number of games started.
- Sub – The number of games played as a substitute. Substitutions were only introduced to the Football League in the 1960s.
- Total – The total number of games played, both as a starter and as a substitute.

Positions key
Pre-1960s		1960s–	
GK	Goalkeeper		
FB	Full back	DF	Defender
HB	Half-back	MF	Midfielder
FW	Forward		
U	Utility player		

Liverpool players with fewer than 25 appearances
Player	Nationality	Position	Liverpool career	Starts	Sub	Total	Goals	Ref.
Player	Nationality	Position	Liverpool career	Appearances			Goals	Ref.
John Cameron	Scotland	FW	1892–1893	9	0	9	5	
John Miller	Scotland	FW	1892–1893	24	0	24	25	
Jock Smith	Scotland	FW	1892–1893	11	0	11	5	
Sydney Ross	Scotland	GK	1892–1893	21	0	21	0	
Joseph Pearson	England	HB	1892	1	0	1	0	
Andrew Kelvin	Scotland	HB	1892	6	0	6	0	
James Kelso	Scotland	FB	1892	1	0	1	0	
Phil Kelly	England	HB	1892–1893	3	0	3	0	
James Henderson	Scotland	FW	1893	1	0	1	0	
Douglas Dick	Scotland	FW	1893–1894	11	0	11	2	
James Stott	England	FW	1893–1894	17	0	17	14	
David Henderson	Scotland	FW	1893–1894	23	0	23	12	
Wally Richardson	England	FB	1893	1	0	1	0	
Hugh Henderson	England	FW	1894	2	0	2	0	
William McCann	Scotland	GK	1894–1895	17	0	17	0	
Arthur Worgan	England	FW	1894	2	0	2	2	
Neil Kerr	Scotland	HB	1894–1895	12	0	12	3	
Gerard Dewhurst	England	FW	1894	1	0	1	0	
John Givens	Scotland	FW	1894	10	0	10	3	
William Hughes	England	FB	1894	1	0	1	0	
John Drummond	Scotland	HB	1894–1895	18	0	18	1	
John Curran	Scotland	FB	1894–1895	24	0	24	0	
James Cameron	Scotland	FB	1894	4	0	4	0	
James Cleland	Scotland	FW	1895	1	0	1	0	
John Whitehead	England	GK	1895	3	0	3	0	
William Keech	England	FB	1895	6	0	6	0	
Ben Bull	England	HB	1896	1	0	1	1	
Bill Michael	Scotland	FW	1896–1897	23	0	23	5	
Willie Donnelly	Ireland	GK	1896–1897	8	0	8	0	
Barney Battles	Scotland	FB	1896–1898	6	0	6	0	
Abe Hartley	Scotland	FW	1897–1898	12	0	12	1	
Bobby Marshall	Scotland	HB	1897–1898	21	0	21	2	
Pat Finnerhan	England	FW	1897–1898	8	0	8	1	
Joe Lumsden	England	HB	1897–1898	8	0	8	2	
William Walker	Scotland	FW	1897–1898	12	0	12	3	
Dan Cunliffe	England	FW	1897–1898	18	0	18	6	
Charlie Jowitt	England	GK	1897	1	0	1	0	
Robert Colvin	Scotland	HB	1898	3	0	3	0	
General Stevenson	England	FB	1898–1899	22	0	22	0	
Abraham Foxall	England	FW	1899	1	0	1	0	
Peter Kyle	Scotland	FW	1899–1900	5	0	5	0	
Jack Parkinson	England	FB	1899	1	0	1	0	
Thomas John Hunter	Scotland	FB	1899–1902	5	0	5	0	
David A. Wilson	England	HB	1899	2	0	2	0	
George Bowen	England	HB	1901	2	0	2	0	
John Davies	England	FW	1901–1902	10	0	10	0	
Bill White	Scotland	FW	1901–1902	6	0	6	1	
Donald McCallum	Scotland	FB	1902–1903	2	0	2	0	
Tommy Green	England	FW	1902–1903	7	0	7	1	
Fred Buck	England	FW	1903–1904	13	0	13	1	
Sydney Smith	England	FW	1903	2	0	2	1	
John McLean	Scotland	FB	1903	4	0	4	0	
Herbert Craik	Scotland	FB	1903	1	0	1	0	
Joe Hoare	England	FB	1903–1904	7	0	7	0	
Jack Chadburn	England	FB	1903	2	0	2	0	
David Murray	Scotland	FB	1904–1905	15	0	15	0	
Charles Cotton	England	GK	1904	12	0	12	0	
James Hughes	England	FB	1904–1909	15	0	15	0	
James Garside	England	FW	1905–1906	5	0	5	0	
Harry Griffiths	England	FB	1905–1908	6	0	6	0	
George Latham	Wales	FB	1905–1908	19	0	19	0	
James Gorman	England	FB	1906–1908	23	0	23	1	
Jack Lipsham	England	HB	1906–1907	3	0	3	0	
Robert Blanthorne	England	FW	1907	2	0	2	1	
Charlie Hewitt	England	FW	1907–1908	16	0	16	6	
Sam Hignett	England	FB	1907	1	0	1	0	
Harold Fitzpatrick	Scotland	FW	1907	4	0	4	2	
John McKenna	England	HB	1907	1	0	1	0	
Arthur Berry	England	FW	1908–1912	4	0	4	0	
Bertram Goode	England	FW	1908–1909	7	0	7	1	
Michael Griffin	England	HB	1908–1909	4	0	4	0	
Don Sloan	Scotland	GK	1908–1909	6	0	6	0	
Dick Allman	England	HB	1909	1	0	1	0	
James Speakman	England	HB	1909–1913	8	0	8	1	
William Hunter	England	FW	1909	1	0	1	0	
Augustus Beeby	England	GK	1909–1910	16	0	16	0	
Herbert Leavey	England	FW	1910–1911	5	0	5	0	
Joe Brough	England	FW	1910–1911	11	0	11	3	
William Stuart	Scotland	HB	1912	5	0	5	1	
Joseph Dines	England	FB	1912	1	0	1	0	
John Tosswill	England	HB	1912–1913	11	0	11	1	
Hugh Lester	United States	HB	1912	2	0	2	0	
James Scott	Scotland	FB	1912	10	0	10	0	
Harry Welfare	England	HB	1913	4	0	4	1	
James Dawson	Scotland	FW	1913–1914	14	0	14	3	
Fred Staniforth	England	HB	1913	3	0	3	0	
Ralph Holden	England	FB	1913	2	0	2	0	
Frank Grayer	England	FB	1914	1	0	1	0	
Charlie Hafekost	England	FB	1914	1	0	1	0	
Wilfred Bartrop	England	HB	1914–1915	3	0	3	0	
Bob McDougall	Scotland	HB	1914	8	0	8	1	
Philip Bratley	England	FB	1914–1915	13	0	13	0	
William Jenkinson	England	FB	1919–1920	13	0	13	0	
Thomas Armstrong	England	GK	1920	1	0	1	0	
John Miller	Scotland	HB	1919–1920	8	0	8	0	
Thomas Bennett	England	FW	1919	1	0	1	0	
Peter McKinney	England	FW	1920–1921	3	0	3	1	
James Penman	Scotland	FB	1920	1	0	1	0	
Harry McNaughton	Scotland	GK	1920	1	0	1	0	
Billy Matthews	Wales	FW	1920–1921	9	0	9	4	
William Cunningham	England	HB	1921–1922	3	0	3	0	
Francis Checkland	England	FB	1921	5	0	5	0	
Harry Beadles	Wales	FW	1921–1923	18	0	18	6	
Frank Mitchell	Scotland	GK	1921	18	0	18	0	
Chris Harrington	England	HB	1921	4	0	4	0	
Edward Parry	Wales	FB	1921–1925	13	0	13	0	
Cyril Gilhespy	England	HB	1922–1925	19	0	19	3	
Jack Sambrook	England	FW	1922–1923	2	0	2	0	
Joe Keetley	England	FW	1923–1924	9	0	9	2	
Billy McDevitt	Ireland	FB	1923–1924	4	0	4	0	
John Jones	Wales	GK	1924–1925	4	0	4	0	
William Chalmers	Scotland	HB	1924–1925	2	0	2	0	
Hector Lawson	England	HB	1924	16	0	16	0	
James Garner	England	FB	1924–1925	5	0	5	0	
Fred Baron	England	FW	1925–1927	20	0	20	7	
Tom Scott	England	FW	1925–1927	18	0	18	4	
Albert Shears	England	FB	1926–1928	16	0	16	0	
William Devlin	Scotland	FW	1927	19	0	19	15	
George Pither	England	HB	1927–1928	12	0	12	1	
Billy Millar	Ireland	FW	1928	3	0	3	2	
Albert Whitehurst	England	FW	1928–1929	8	0	8	2	
Bill Salisbury	Scotland	FW	1928–1929	17	0	17	3	
Jimmy Gray	Scotland	FB	1928	1	0	1	0	
John Lindsay	Scotland	FB	1928–1929	16	0	16	3	
Neil McBain	Scotland	FB	1928	12	0	12	0	
Bill Murray	Scotland	U	1928–1929	4	0	4	1	
Allan Scott	England	FW	1929–1931	4	0	4	2	
Tommy Gardner	England	FB	1930	5	0	5	0	
John McFarlane	Scotland	FW	1929	2	0	2	0	
Andrew Aitken	England	GK	1930	1	0	1	0	
Robert Ireland	Scotland	FB	1930	1	0	1	0	
Charlie Thompson	England	HB	1930–1931	6	0	6	0	
John Charlton	England	FB	1931	3	0	3	0	
Alastair Henderson	Scotland	FB	1931–1932	5	0	5	0	
Harry Barkas	England	FW	1931	5	0	5	0	
Norman James	England	FB	1931–1932	8	0	8	0	
Les Bruton	England	FW	1932–1933	8	0	8	1	
Edmund Crawford	England	FW	1932–1933	8	0	8	4	
Ted Hancock	England	FW	1932–1933	10	0	10	2	
Jack Roberts	England	FW	1933	1	0	1	0	
Norman Low	Scotland	FB	1934–1936	13	0	13	0	
Bob Glassey	England	FW	1935–1936	9	0	9	4	
John Browning	Scotland	FB	1935–1939	19	0	19	0	
Stanley Kane	England	GK	1935–1936	6	0	6	0	
Jimmy Collins	England	FW	1936–1937	7	0	7	0	
Billy Hartill	England	FW	1936	4	0	4	0	
John Shield	England	FB	1936	1	0	1	0	
Ted Harston	England	FW	1937	5	0	5	3	
Alex Smith	Scotland	FW	1937	1	0	1	0	
John Shafto	England	FW	1937–1939	20	0	20	7	
William Hood	Ireland	FB	1937	3	0	3	0	
George Paterson	Scotland	HB	1938–1939	3	0	3	1	
Bill Kinghorn	Scotland	HB	1938–1939	19	0	19	4	
Matthew Fitzsimmons	England	FB	1938	1	0	1	0	
Harman van den Berg	South Africa	HB	1938–1939	19	0	19	3	
Ron Jones	Wales	FB	1938–1939	5	0	5	1	
Keith Peters	England	FB	1939	1	0	1	0	
Fred Finney	England	HB	1946	2	0	2	0	
John Easdale	Scotland	FB	1946–1947	2	0	2	0	
Fred Nickson	England	GK	1946	3	0	3	0	
Harry Kaye	England	FB	1946–1947	2	0	2	0	
Len Carney	England	FW	1946–1947	6	0	6	1	
Tommy McLeod	Scotland	HB	1947–1948	7	0	7	0	
Stan Palk	England	FB	1947–1948	13	0	13	0	
William Watkinson	England	HB	1947–1950	24	0	24	2	
Doug McAvoy	Scotland	HB	1948	2	0	2	0	
Alex Muir	Scotland	HB	1948	4	0	4	0	
Les Shannon	England	FW	1948	11	0	11	1	
Peter Kippax	England	HB	1949	1	0	1	0	
Sam Shields	Scotland	FB	1949	1	0	1	0	
Jack Haigh	England	FW	1950–1952	11	0	11	3	
Joe Cadden	England	FB	1950–1952	5	0	5	0	
Frank Christie	Scotland	FB	1950	4	0	4	0	
Don Woan	England	HB	1951	2	0	2	0	
Steve Parr	England	FB	1951–1953	20	0	20	0	
George Whitworth	England	FB	1952	9	0	9	0	
Arthur Rowley	England	FW	1952–1953	11	0	11	0	
Merfyn Jones	Wales	FW	1952–1953	5	0	5	0	
Hugh Gerhardi	South Africa	HB	1953	6	0	6	0	
Harold Jones	England	FW	1953	1	0	1	0	
Albert Childs	England	FB	1953	2	0	2	0	
Keith Burkinshaw	England	FB	1955	1	0	1	0	
Joe Maloney	England	U	1953	12	0	12	0	
Alex South	England	FB	1955	7	0	7	1	
John Price	Wales	FB	1955	1	0	1	0	
Fred Perry	England	FB	1955	1	0	1	0	
Fred Tomley	England	FB	1955	2	0	2	0	
Joe Dickson	England	FW	1956	6	0	6	4	
Bobby Murdoch	England	FW	1957–1959	19	0	19	7	
Tony McNamara	England	HB	1957–1958	10	0	10	3	
Alan Banks	England	FW	1958–1961	8	0	8	6	
Reginald Blore	Wales	HB	1959	1	0	1	0	
John Nicholson	England	FB	1959	1	0	1	0	
Willie Carlin	England	MF	1959	1	0	1	0	
Allan Jones	Wales	FB	1959–1963	5	0	5	0	
Gordon Wallace	Scotland	MF	1962–1965	22	0	22	6	
Robert Thomson	Scotland	DF	1963–1964	8	0	8	0	
Phil Chisnall	England	FW	1964–1966	8	1	9	2	
Alan Hignett	England	DF	1965	1	0	1	0	
Tommy Lowry	England	DF	1965	1	0	1	0	
Billy Molyneux	England	GK	1965	1	0	1	0	
John Sealey	England	MF	1965	1	0	1	1	
John Ogston	Scotland	GK	1967	1	0	1	0	
Dave Wilson	England	MF	1967	0	1	1	0	
Doug Livermore	England	MF	1968–1970	14	4	18	0	
Steve Peplow	England	FW	1969	3	0	3	0	
Chris Fagan	England	DF	1970–1971	1	1	2	0	
Jack Whitham	England	FW	1970–1972	16	2	18	7	
Roy Evans	England	DF	1970–1973	11	0	11	0	
Steve Arnold	England	MF	1971	1	1	2	0	
Frankie Lane	England	GK	1972	2	0	2	0	
Trevor Storton	England	DF	1972–1974	11	1	12	0	
Derek Brownbill	England	FW	1973	1	0	1	0	
Alan Waddle	England	FW	1973–1977	16	6	22	1	
Dave Rylands	England	DF	1974	1	0	1	0	
Max Thompson	England	MF	1974–1975	1	1	2	0	
Brian Kettle	England	DF	1975–1977	4	0	4	0	
Kevin Kewley	England	FW	1978	0	1	1	0	
Steve Ogrizovic	England	GK	1978–1980	5	0	5	0	
Avi Cohen	Israel	DF	1979–1981	21	3	24	1	
Richard Money	England	DF	1980–1981	15	2	17	0	
Howard Gayle	England	FW	1980–1981	3	2	5	1	
Kevin Sheedy	Ireland	MF	1981–1982	3	2	5	2	
Colin Russell	England	FW	1981	1	0	1	0	
Alan Irvine	Scotland	FW	1986–1987	0	4	4	0	
Brian Mooney	Ireland	MF	1986	0	1	1	0	
John Durnin	England	FW	1986–1988	2	1	3	0	
Mark Seagraves	England	MF	1986	2	0	2	0	
Alex Watson	England	DF	1988–1989	6	3	9	0	
Jimmy Carter	England	FW	1991	8	0	8	0	
David Speedie	Scotland	FW	1991	9	5	14	6	
Barry Jones	England	MF	1991	0	1	1	0	
Torben Piechnik	Denmark	DF	1992–1993	23	1	24	0	
Phil Charnock	England	MF	1992	2	0	2	0	
István Kozma	Hungary	MF	1992	3	7	10	0	
Lee Jones	Wales	FW	1994–1996	0	4	4	0	
Mark Kennedy	Ireland	MF	1995–1998	5	16	21	0	
Sean Dundee	South Africa	FW	1998–1999	0	5	5	0	
Jean-Michel Ferri	France	MF	1999	0	2	2	0	
Leyton Maxwell	Wales	MF	1999	1	0	1	1	
Jon Newby	England	FW	1999–2000	0	4	4	0	
Frode Kippe	Norway	DF	1999–2001	0	2	2	0	
Pegguy Arphexad	France	GK	2000–2002	5	1	6	0	
Richie Partridge	Ireland	MF	2000–2004	1	2	3	0	
Bernard Diomède	France	MF	2000–2001	4	1	5	0	
Stephen Wright	England	DF	2000–2002	15	6	21	1	
Gregory Vignal	France	DF	2001–2003	14	6	20	0	
Neil Mellor	England	FW	2002–2005	15	7	22	6	
Jon Otsemobor	England	DF	2002–2003	6	0	6	0	
Nicolas Anelka	France	FW	2001–2002	15	7	22	5	
Abel Xavier	Portugal	DF	2002	20	1	21	2	
John Welsh	England	MF	2002–2005	3	7	10	0	
David Raven	England	DF	2004–2005	3	1	4	0	
Paul Jones	Wales	GK	2004	2	0	2	0	
Patrice Luzi	France	GK	2004	0	1	1	0	
Darren Potter	Ireland	MF	2004–2005	10	7	17	0	
Mark Smyth	England	MF	2004	0	1	1	0	
Zak Whitbread	United States	DF	2004–2005	6	1	7	0	
Mauricio Pellegrino	Argentina	DF	2005	12	1	13	0	
Scott Carson	England	GK	2005–2006	9	0	9	0	
Antonio Barragán	Spain	DF	2005	0	1	1	0	
Gabriel Paletta	Argentina	DF	2006–2007	6	2	8	1	
Lee Peltier	England	DF	2006–2007	4	0	4	0	
James Smith	England	DF	2006	0	1	1	0	
Danny Guthrie	England	MF	2006–2007	2	5	7	0	
Jan Kromkamp	Netherlands	DF	2006	8	10	18	0	
Miki Roqué	Spain	DF	2006	0	1	1	0	
Sebastián Leto	Argentina	MF	2007	4	0	4	0	
Charles Itandje	France	GK	2007–2008	7	0	7	0	
Jack Hobbs	England	DF	2007	3	2	5	0	
Daniele Padelli	Italy	GK	2007	1	0	1	0	
Philipp Degen	Switzerland	DF	2008–2010	8	5	13	0	
Diego Cavalieri	Brazil	GK	2008–2010	10	0	10	0	
Stephen Darby	England	DF	2008–2010	2	4	6	0	
Damien Plessis	France	MF	2008–2009	7	1	8	1	
Daniel Ayala	Spain	DF	2009–2010	2	3	5	0	
Nathan Eccleston	England	FW	2009–2010	1	8	9	0	
Daniel Pacheco	Spain	FW	2009–2012	4	12	16	0	
Jack Robinson	England	DF	2010–2013	9	2	11	0	
David Amoo	England	FW	2010	1	0	1	0	
Lauri Dalla Valle	Finland	FW	2010	0	1	1	0	
Milan Jovanović	Serbia	FW	2010–2011	13	5	18	2	
Paul Konchesky	England	DF	2010–2011	18	0	18	0	
Christian Poulsen	Denmark	MF	2010–2011	18	3	21	0	
Danny Wilson	Scotland	DF	2010–2011	8	1	9	0	
Tom Ince	England	FW	2010	0	1	1	0	
Sebastián Coates	Uruguay	DF	2011–2013	17	7	24	2	
Doni	Brazil	GK	2012–2013	4	0	4	0	
Adam Morgan	England	FW	2012	2	1	3	0	
Nuri Şahin	Turkey	MF	2012	12	0	12	3	
Andre Wisdom	England	DF	2012–2013	21	1	22	1	
Oussama Assaidi	Morocco	MF	2012–2013	6	6	12	0	
Suso	Spain	MF	2012–2014	12	9	21	1	
Samed Yeşil	Germany	FW	2012	2	0	2	0	
Jerome Sinclair	England	FW	2012–2016	1	4	5	1	
Conor Coady	England	MF	2012–2013	1	1	2	0	
Iago Aspas	Spain	FW	2013–2014	6	5	11	1	
Aly Cissokho	France	DF	2013–2014	12	1	13	0	
Luis Alberto	Spain	MF	2013–2014	2	10	12	0	
Victor Moses	Nigeria	FW	2013–2014	9	8	17	2	
Brad Smith	Australia	DF	2013–2016	8	3	11	1	
João Carlos Teixeira	Portugal	MF	2014–2016	5	3	8	1	
Javier Manquillo	Spain	DF	2014–2015	18	1	19	0	
Jordan Rossiter	England	MF	2014–2015	3	2	5	1	
Jordan Williams	Wales	MF	2014	0	1	1	0	
Cameron Brannagan	England	MF	2015–2016	5	4	9	0	
Pedro Chirivella	Spain	MF	2015–2020	6	5	11	0	
Ádám Bogdán	Hungary	GK	2015–2016	6	0	6	0	
Connor Randall	England	DF	2015–2017	7	1	8	0	
Tiago Ilori	Portugal	DF	2016	3	0	3	0	
Ryan Kent	England	MF	2016	1	0	1	0	
Kevin Stewart	England	DF	2016–2017	14	6	20	0	
Sheyi Ojo	England	MF	2016–2017	6	7	13	1	
Joe Maguire	England	DF	2016	0	1	1	0	
Steven Caulker	England	DF	2016	1	3	4	0	
Danny Ward	Wales	GK	2016–2017	3	0	3	0	
Sergi Canos	Spain	MF	2016	0	1	1	0	
Marko Grujić	Serbia	MF	2016–2020	5	11	16	1	
Ovie Ejaria	Nigeria	MF	2016–2020	5	3	8	0	
Ben Woodburn	Wales	FW	2016–2018	4	7	11	1	
Harry Wilson	Wales	MF	2017–2020	1	1	2	0	
Rafael Camacho	Portugal	DF	2019	1	1	2	0	
Ki-Jana Hoever	Netherlands	DF	2019–2020	3	1	4	1	
Rhian Brewster	England	FW	2019–2020	2	2	4	0	
Herbie Kane	England	MF	2019	1	1	2	0	
Sepp van den Berg	Netherlands	DF	2019–2020	3	1	4	0	
Morgan Boyes	Wales	DF	2019–2020	1	1	2	0	
Tony Gallacher	Scotland	DF	2019	1	0	1	0	
Isaac Christie-Davies	Wales	MF	2019	1	0	1	0	
Thomas Hill	England	MF	2019	1	0	1	0	
Luis Longstaff	England	MF	2019	1	0	1	0	
Jack Bearne	England	FW	2019	0	1	1	0	
Leighton Clarkson	England	MF	2019–2020	2	1	3	0	
James Norris	England	DF	2019–2022	0	2	2	0	
Yasser Larouci	Algeria	DF	2020	1	1	2	0	
Adam Lewis	England	DF	2020	1	0	1	0	
Jake Cain	England	MF	2020	1	0	1	0	
Liam Millar	Canada	FW	2020	1	0	1	0	
Joe Hardy	England	FW	2020	0	1	1	0	
Elijah Dixon-Bonner	England	MF	2020–2022	1	2	3	0	
Rhys Williams	England	DF	2020–2021	14	5	19	0	
Billy Koumetio	France	DF	2020–2021	1	1	2	0	
Ozan Kabak	Turkey	DF	2021	13	0	13	0	
Kaide Gordon	England	MF	2021–	4	3	7	1	
Tyler Morton	England	MF	2021–2025	9	5	14	0	
Harvey Blair	England	FW	2021	1	0	1	0	
Owen Beck	Wales	MF	2021–	0	3	3	0	
Max Woltman	England	FW	2021–2022	1	1	2	0	
Melkamu Frauendorf	Germany	MF	2022	1	1	2	0	
Fábio Carvalho	Portugal	MF	2022–2023	8	13	21	3	
Stefan Bajcetic	Spain	MF	2022–2024	12	10	22	1	
Bobby Clark	England	FW	2022–2024	4	10	14	1	
Arthur	Brazil	MF	2022	0	1	1	0	
Calvin Ramsay	Scotland	DF	2022–	2	2	4	0	
Layton Stewart	England	FW	2022	1	0	1	0	
Ben Gannon-Doak	Scotland	FW	2022–2023	4	6	10	0	
Luke Chambers	England	DF	2023–	2	3	5	0	
Calum Scanlon	England	DF	2023–	0	2	2	0	
James McConnell	England	MF	2023–	6	9	15	0	
Jayden Danns	England	FW	2024–	1	9	10	3	
Lewis Koumas	Wales	FW	2024–	6	9	15	2	
Mateusz Musiałowski	Poland	FW	2024	0	1	1	0	
Vítězslav Jaroš	Czech Republic	GK	2024–	1	1	2	0	
Amara Nallo	England	DF	2025–	0	3	3	0	
Isaac Mabaya	England	DF	2025–	0	1	1	0	
Trent Koné-Doherty	Ireland	MF	2025–2026	0	2	2	0	
Giorgi Mamardashvili	Georgia	GK	2025–	21	1	22	0	
Giovanni Leoni	Italy	DF	2025–	1	0	1	0	
Freddie Woodman	England	GK	2025–	3	1	4	0	
Kieran Morrison	Northern Ireland	FW	2025–	1	1	2	0	
Wellity Lucky	England	DF	2025–	0	1	1	0	
Jérémy Jacquet	France	DF	2026–	14	2	16	0	
Ronald Araújo	Uruguay	DF	2026–	13	2	15	2	
Víctor Muñoz	Spain	FW	2026–	6	6	12	2	
Bradley Barcola	France	FW	2026–	10	4	13	3	
