= Phil Kelly =

Phil or Philip Kelly may refer to:

- Phil Kelly (artist) (1950–2010), Irish expressionist painter.
- Phil Kelly (Australian footballer) (born 1957), Australian rules footballer.
- Phil Kelly (footballer, born 1869) (1869–?), English association football player (Liverpool FC).
- Phil Kelly (footballer, born 1939) (1939–2012), Irish association football player.
- Phil Kelly (journalist) (born 1946), English journalist, editor and Labour councillor.
- Philip Kelly (Australian politician) (1886–1954), member of the Tasmanian House of Assembly.
- Philip Kelly (Canadian politician) (1901–1985), member of the Legislative Assembly of Ontario.
- Philip James Vandeleur Kelly, British Army general.
- Phil Kelly (American political scientist), the Roe R. Cross Distinguished Professor of Political Science at Emporia State University.
