= 1891–92 Dumbarton F.C. season =

Dumbarton
1891–92 season
- Stadium: Boghead Park, Dumbarton
- Scottish Football League: Champions
- Scottish Cup: Quarter-final
- Top goalscorer: League: Jack Bell (19); All: Jack Bell (21)
Home colours

The 1891–92 season was the 19th Scottish football season in which Dumbarton competed at a national level, entering the Scottish Football League and the Scottish Cup. In addition Dumbarton played in the Dumbartonshire Cup, the Glasgow Charity Cup and the Greenock and District Charity Cup.

== Story of the Season ==
Dumbarton entered season 1891–92 as the defending league champions, with an almost unchanged side. The battle between professionalism and amateurism in football still raged, but for now playing for the love of the game still won in Scotland.

=== August ===
The season opened on 8 August with a trip to the borders, where a friendly 3–3 draw was played against 5th KRV. A further pre-season friendly was played 4 days later at Airdrie – a 2–0 reverse being suffered.

The league campaign opened on 15 August, with an away fixture against Cambuslang. The team turned out as follows: McLeod (goal); Watson and McMillan (full backs); Lang, Boyle and Keir (half backs); Taylor, W. Bell, J. Miller, Thomson and J. Bell (forwards). Taylor was the first to score for the Sons after 20 minutes and Thomson followed before the interval. The second half was evenly contested and the game finished 2–0.

A week later, the unfurling of the (joint) league champions flag was celebrated at Boghead where Abercorn were the visitors on league duty. The places of Watson, Lang and W. Bell were taken by A. Miller, John Gillan and McNaught respectively. Bell netted his first goal of the season in five minutes and three more followed by half time – with Abercorn missing a penalty. In the second half it was more of the same with the final score being 8–1.

On 29 August the two unbeaten sides in the league so far met, as Hearts took on Dumbarton at Tynecastle. A full strength side took to the field as Watson and Galbraith returned to the side. The Sons got off to a good start and an early ‘goal’ was ruled out for offside. Hearts then came more into the game and scored first, though Dumbarton equalised from an own goal before half time. Early in the second half the visitors ‘scored’ again but the referee did not see the ball cross the line. Luck wasn't with the Sons and Hearts took advantage with a quick brace, the second being a Miller own goal – leaving the final score at 3–1.

The result left Hearts on top of the table, with Dumbarton and Celtic leading the chase 2 points behind.

=== September ===
On 5 September, Dumbarton travelled to Ibrox to play last season's joint champions Rangers in a league fixture. Only one change was made with Thomson coming back in place of Galbraith. The Sons were ahead within 10 minutes from a Taylor goal, and just a minute later the same player made it two, with the hat trick being completed after 15 minutes. Rangers were a disappointing lot and it wasn't till late on that they scored a consolation goal leaving the result at 3–1.

A week later Leith Athletic were visitors to Boghead in their league encounter. Miller failed to appear and was replaced by McDonald with Galbraith coming in for McMillan. Taylor continued his recent goal scoring form by having the Sons two. The other Dumbarton forwards decided to join in the second half with Miller(2); McNaught and Bell completing a 6–0 thrashing.

Hearts, the early league pace setters, played their return league fixture against Dumbarton at Boghead on 19 September. Miller and Thomson returned to the side. The Sons were quickest off the mark and McNaught had the home side ahead within nine minutes. Miller and Bell made it three before 15 minutes had passed. Bell then scored again before Hearts got one back – 4–1 after 20 minutes. Understandably the pace of the game dropped and there were no more goals before the interval. Watson had been injured in the first half and had retired for a time, and although he returned in the second half he was clearly unfit. Nevertheless, it was not until two minutes from the final whistle that Miller scored the last goal of the game for a 5–1 thumping.

On 26 September Dumbarton were at Celtic Park to play off a league fixture. Watson had not recovered from his injury and was replaced by McDonald. Both teams played a fast and exciting game and despite chances falling to both the interval was reached goalless. It only took five minutes however for Celtic to take the lead in the second half and while the Sons had numerous attempts at equalising, they came to nothing and in the end the Celts scored a second just on full-time being called.

So the end of September still saw Hearts in the lead with 13 points, 3 points ahead of the chasing pack of Celtic, Dumbarton and Leith Athletic.

=== October ===
At the beginning of the season a Canadian international touring side played a series of matches in the UK. One of these was against a Scotland XI on 3 October at Ibrox Park. John McLeod and John Bell played in the 5–1 win for the Scots, with Bell scoring two of the goals.

On the same day Dumbarton visited county neighbours, Vale of Leven, on league business. In addition to the missing personnel from the representative match Taylor's place was taken by a trialist. A goal from Miller after 40 minutes was all that separated the teams at half time. A penalty brought Vale level but an own goal shortly before the end provided the Sons with a 2–1 win.

A free week was followed on 17 October with a home league fixture against Third Lanark. McLeod returned to the team but Watson and Bell were absent. Nevertheless, the weakened team played well and goals in each half by Miller were enough for a 2–0 victory.

St Mirren were the next visitors to Boghead on 24 October where an unchanged side was fielded by Dumbarton. Taylor and Miller (his fourth goal in three games) had the Sons two ahead by the interval. In the second half Taylor scored again before the saints got one back. A converted penalty kick by McMillan made it four before a late St Mirren flurry saw the final score being 4–2.

On the last day of the month the Sons travelled to Edinburgh to play the return league fixture against Leith Athletic. Bell returned but Taylor and Miller were missing from the team. Bell wasted no time in adding to his goal tally by scoring Dumbarton's first in 10 minutes. This was the position until Leith evened up matters midway through the second half but a McMillan strike and an own goal made the points safe for the Sons in a 3–1 win.

At the end of the month, with another 4 victories secured, Dumbarton were still in second place with 18 points from 11 games – a point behind Hearts but crucially 2 games in hand.

=== November ===
The month began with a visit to county neighbours Renton for a league fixture on 7 November. Taylor returned but Galbriaith dropped out. Thomson and McMillan had the Sons two ahead after 35 minutes but Renton got one back before half time. An equaliser was scored midway through the second half but Taylor notched the winner for Dumbarton and another two points added to the total.

On 14 November Clyde were visitors to Boghead. Miller returned at centre forward in an otherwise unchanged side. In what became a fairly one-sided match both Bell and Taylor scored hat tricks in an 8–2 thrashing.

The match against St Mirren on 21 November was postponed as Dumbarton were unable to raise a team due to illness and 2nd XI commitments.

A week later there was a rest from league duty and with the first Scottish Cup encounter. Much on the prompting of Dumbarton officials, a qualifying process had been introduced to the cup competition, and Dumbarton's first appearance was at the fifth round stage. Glasgow Thistle were the opponents at Boghead. McLeod and Richmond were unavailable their places taken by Barr and Smith from the Seconds. Thistle held their own until half time but then goals from Taylor, Bell (2) and Miller carried the Sons through to the next round.

At the end of November the positions in the league saw Hearts lead with 21 points from 14 matches, Dumbarton a point behind but with just 12 games and Celtic in third with 16 points from just 9 games.

=== December ===
December began with a league visit to Cathkin Park to play Third Lanark with Dumbarton fielding an unchanged side. Thirds started brightly and were two ahead early on – and had another disallowed for offside. However two goals from Bell brought the teams level before the break. Early in the second half a Thirds man had to retire injured and the Sons took full advantage of the extra man, with Bell completing his hat trick then McNaught and Thomson completing a 5–2 victory.

On 12 December, the league fixture against local rivals Vale of Leven was played at Boghead. Watson was a welcome returnee to the team while McDonald took the place of Keir. Conditions were miserable but Dumbarton played much the better. Taylor scored within seconds of the game starting, then Miller, Thomson and McDonald had the home team four ahead by half time. Another four goals had Dumbarton 8–0 in front with 20 minutes of the second half played and with the weather worsening the Vale captain intimated to the referee that the Vale team surrendered the game to the homesters.

A week later it was back to Cathkin Park – but this time on Scottish Cup duty. McLeod and Keir returned to the squad. As in the previous game between the sides Thirds were first to show and were a goal ahead after 20 minutes but McNaught got the Sons back on level terms just on half time. Luck once again deserted Thirds as one of their players retired injured and Taylor scored twice to take full advantage of the extra man. Late in the game Bell had to leave the field after being charged by a Thirds man.

The 26 December saw near neighbours Renton come to Boghead on league duty. Keir was missing from the previous week's team. The game began in atrocious conditions but McNaught had the Sons ahead within 10 minutes. Renton got the equaliser from a scrimmage but before half time Bell made the score 2–1 before half time. Despite efforts from both teams there were no further goals.

The league positions at the end of the year looked promising for Dumbarton. They led the table with 28 points, five ahead of Hearts. However, Celtic still posed a real threat to Dumbarton's position in the standings, trailing by ten points but with six games still to play.

=== January ===
The New Year began with a visit to Celtic Park in a friendly. Lang replaced Keir in the team with Richmond coming back in place of Smith. A close contest was expected but from the minute that Taylor had the Sons ahead early on it was one-way traffic. Bell, Taylor again and Thomson (2) made it 5–0 by half time. In the second half it was more of the same with Bell getting his second, then McNaught and finally Taylor completing his hat trick for an 8–0 walloping. A day later, Dumbarton met hearts in a friendly at Tynecastle. The only change to the team was the resting of Taylor. In a complete reversal of roles it was the Edinburgh side who dominated proceedings taking a 5–0 lead by the interval. Thomson saved the Sons blushes with a consolation goal in the second half but Hearts increased their tally by two for a 7–1 trouncing.

Then on 4 January, Dumbarton made the trip up north to face Aberdeen. McLeod and Miller were rested but despite the missing first XI men Dumbarton came away with a fine 6–1 win.

Bad weather ensured that little football would be played for most of the month, until 23 January when old rivals Queen's Park came to Boghead for a seventh round Scottish Cup tie. Dumbarton were back to full strength with the return of McLeod. Keir, Taylor and both Millers. Queens opened the scoring after 15 minutes and were two up just before half time. On crossing over the Sons pressed and were rewarded by goals from Boyle then Taylor to claim a 2–2 draw

A week later at Hampden, in front of 15,000 spectators, the replay took place. Dick Hunter of St Mirren took Watson's place at full back. Both sides had chances in the first half but neither team could find the net. However within five minutes of the restart Queens were ahead and three more followed before Taylor scored a consolation goal 13 minutes from time.

=== February ===
Bad winter weather put paid to any play by Dumbarton during February.

So the positions in the league at the end of the month were unchanged, other than Celtic closing the gap in third – now 6 points behind with 4 games in hand.

=== March ===
A series of international trial matches were held on 5 March to consider selection of teams to represent Scotland in the upcoming Home International Championship - John McLeod, Tom McMillan, Dickie Boyle, John Taylor, John Bell and Willie Thomson all took part.

On 12 March Dumbarton played their first match in six weeks with a semi final tie in the county cup at home against Methlan Park. A number of second XI players were given starts but the long lay-off did not seem to have done the Sons forwards much harm as they raced to a 4–0 lead by half time. In the second half McLeod, who was taking a rare opportunity to show his outfield skills, joined in the scoring melee with a brace and in the end the game ended in a 9–0 rout.

A week later Dumbarton returned to league duty with a visit to Paisley to play St Mirren. Watson and Taylor were missing, their places taken by Smith and McIndewar. Bell had the Sons two ahead but the Saints got one back before the break. An own goal restored the visitors two goal advantage before the Buddies got another, but it was not enough as Dumbarton ran out 3–2 winners.

On 26 March John Taylor and William Thomson both earned their first caps for Scotland against Wales, with Thomson scoring a goal in the 6–1 win. At the same time Dumbarton entertained Cambuslang in the league at Boghead. In addition to the internationals, the Sons were also minus McMillan who had decided to retire from the game, and Keir. Bell and Miller put the Sons ahead early but Cambuslang came back to equalise before half time. McLeod, making up for the missing forwards, put Dumbarton ahead again. Another from McLeod and one from Miller made the final score 5–2.

Dumbarton won two more times and, by the end of March, led the table with 32 points and four games remaining.

=== April ===
On 2 April John Bell earned his second cap against England, and John McLeod earned his fourth cap in the same game, with Bell scoring Scotland's goal in the 4–1 defeat.

A week later Rangers came to Boghead on league business. Unfortunately the referee from Dundee failed to appear and both teams agreed to a Dumbarton official taking his place. Goals from Boyle(2), Taylor and Bell gave the Sons a 4–1 victory, but immediately after the game Rangers protested the result. Rangers reason for the protest was that ‘Dumbarton had taken then down too far, and that it would be an extremely nice thing if they could get another chance to show their paces’. The protest was subsequently upheld even though it was the Rangers secretary who had suggested that the Dumbarton referee officiate, however the League censured Rangers for ‘unsportsmanlike behaviour’.

On 11 April teams representing the Scottish and English Leagues met at Bolton. John McLeod, Jack Bell, Dickie Boyle and John Taylor all played in the 2–2 draw, in which Bell scored one of the goals.

The following weekend Dumbarton met Vale of Leven in the Dumbartonshire Cup final at Boghead. A full strength team turned out. Miller had Dumbarton ahead midway through the first half and another goal gained through a scrimmage made the half time score 2–0. There were no further goals and Dumbarton retained the trophy for the fourth successive year.

In a big game which would decide the destination of the league title, Celtic visited Dumbarton on 23 April. McDonald was the only change to the side replacing Stewart. A game saw no goals by half time but just as it looked as if the game would end in a scoreless draw Miller scored a goal to provide Dumbarton with a 1–0 win.

Having taken the massive step of beating their closest challengers, on 30 April Dumbarton travelled to meet Clyde in Glasgow with an unchanged side. In less than a minute Bell had the Sons ahead but it was not to be the easy victory that might have been predicted as Clyde came back with their best performance of the season to record a 4–1 result.

So April ended with Dumbarton still ahead with 34 points, with 2 games left to play. Hearts had the same number of points but only had one remaining game, whilst Celtic were on 28 points with 4 games left.

=== May ===
On 4 May the re-run of the protested match against Rangers was played at Boghead. An unchanged side apart from Galbraith taking Taylor's place, turned out determined to show that the first game's result had been no fluke. A Bell hat-trick contributed towards a 6–0 thrashing – not counting another two ‘goals’ that were disallowed. This victory ensured a 100% home league record.

Three days later, Dumbarton went into their final league game knowing that a draw at Abercorn would be sufficient to win the title outright. Taylor was back in his place for the match and while the Abbies led at halftime a Thomson goal made the score 1–1 and this is how it finished. Dumbarton champions again! On 14 May Dumbarton fielded their second XI to begin their defence of the Greenock Charity Cup against Dykebar at Cappielow. The Sons had the greater share of the play and ran out 1–0 winners.

The following weekend Dumbarton turned out at Ibrox to play Celtic in the semi-final of the Glasgow Charity Cup. Dick Hunter of St Mirren guested for the Sons. With a strong wind in their favour Dumbarton bossed the first half although it was not until late in the first half that Miller scored the opener. In the second half however the Celts took full advantage of the elements– and would gain some revenge for losing the league title by recording a 3–1 win.

The final game of the season took place on 28 May, with the final of the Greenock Charity Cup against Morton at Cappielow. Again a ‘scratch’ side was played with only McLeod and Galbraith of the full team present and a strong Morton side recorded a 4–1 victory.

It was however not the final game for one of the Dumbarton players as on 30 May, a Scottish League XI played a Scottish Alliance XI, with John Miller being selected to play in the 'League' team, scoring twice in the 4–3 win.

On the same day the Dumbarton Rangers won the county Second XI cup with a 6–3 win over Smithston Hibs. With this win the Rangers matched the ‘big’ team by winning a fourth successive county championship.

== Match results ==
=== Scottish League ===
15 August 1891 Scottish League	Cambuslang	0–2	Dumbarton	Whitefield Park
			Taylor 20'; Thomson, W

22 August 1891 Scottish League	Dumbarton	8–1	Abercorn	Boghead Park
	Bell 5'		Goal	Attendance: 3,000; Referee: Mr Bowie

29 August 1891 Scottish League	Hearts	3–1	Dumbarton	Tynecastle Stadium
	Taylor; Baird; McLeod (o.g.)		Fairbairn (o.g.)	Attendance: 7,000; Referee: J Marshall

5 September 1891 Scottish League	Rangers	1–3	Dumbarton	Ibrox Park
	Kerr 89'		Taylor 10', 11', 15'	Attendance: 5,000; Referee: J Aitken

12 September 1891 Scottish League	Dumbarton	6–0	Leith Athletic	Boghead Park
	Taylor 10', 40'; Miller, J McNaught; Bell			Attendance: Mr Young

19 September 1891 Scottish League	Dumbarton	5–1	Hearts	Boghead Park
	McNaught 9'; Miller, J 89'; Bell 15', 16'		Scott 20'	Attendance: 3,000; Referee: J Aitken

26 September 1891 Scottish League	Celtic	2–0	Dumbarton	Celtic Park
	Campbell 50'; McMahon 89'			Attendance: 12,000; Referee: J Marshall

3 October 1891 Scottish League	Vale of Leven	1–2	Dumbarton	Millburn Park
	Bruce (pen.)		Miller, J 40'; Cornock (o.g.)	Referee: Mr Robertson

17 October 1891 Scottish League	Dumbarton	2–0	Third Lanark	Boghead Park
	Miller, J 72'			Referee: Mr MacLean

24 October 1891 Scottish League	Dumbarton	4–2	St Mirren	Boghead Park
	Taylor; Miller, J McMillan (pen.)		Douglas 90'	Attendance: 1,500; Referee: J Holmes

31 October 1891 Scottish League	Leith Athletic	1–3	Dumbarton	Bank Park, Leith
	McQueen		Bell 10'; McMillan scrimmage	Attendance: 5,000; Referee: J Marshall

7 November 1891 Scottish League	Renton	2–3	Dumbarton	Tontine Park
	Brady; Cowan		Thomson, W 25'; McMillan 35'; Taylor 80'	Attendance: 3,000; Referee: Mr Foster

14 November 1891 Scottish League	Dumbarton	8–2	Clyde	Boghead Park
	Taylor; Bell; Sawers (o.g.); McNaught		McInnes	Attendance: 1,500; Referee: Mr Allison

5 December 1891 Scottish League	Third Lanark	2–5	Dumbarton	Cathkin Park
	Crosssan 5'; Thomas		Bell; McNaught; Thomson, W 90'	Referee: Mr Foster

12 December 1891 Scottish League	Dumbarton	8–0	Vale of Leven	Boghead Park
	Taylor 1'; Miller, J 20'; Thomson, W McDonald 44'; McNaught

26 December 1891 Scottish League	Dumbarton	2–1	Renton	Boghead Park
	McNaught; Bell		Goal

19 March 1892 Scottish League	St Mirren	2–3	Dumbarton	Westmarch (stadium)
	Smith scrimmage		Bell (o.g.)	Referee: Mr Young

26 March 1892 Scottish League	Dumbarton	5–2	Cambuslang	Boghead Park
	Bell; Miller, J McLeod		Paterson; Low	Referee: Mr McHardy

9 April 1892 Scottish League	Dumbarton	4–1; VOID	Rangers	Boghead Park
	Boyle 20'; Taylor; Bell		McPherson	Referee: J Baptie

23 April 1892 Scottish League	Dumbarton	1–0	Celtic	Boghead Park
	Miller, J 80'			Attendance: 12,000; Referee: Mr Marshall

30 April 1892 Scottish League	Clyde	4–1	Dumbarton	Barrowfield Park
	Sawers McInnes		Bell 1'	Attendance: 6,000; Referee: J Marshall

4 May 1892 Scottish League	Dumbarton	6–0	Rangers	Boghead Park
	Bell (pen.); Miller, J Thomson, W Galbraith			Attendance: 1,000; Referee: F Watt

7 May 1892 Scottish League	Abercorn	1–1	Dumbarton	Underwood Park, Paisley
	Watson		Thomson, W 80'	Referee: Mr Young

=== Scottish Cup ===
28 November 1891 First round	Dumbarton	4–0	Thistle	Boghead Park
	Taylor 65'; Bell 70', 75'; Miller, J 76'			Referee: Mr Foster

19 December 1891 Second round	Third Lanark	1–3	Dumbarton	Cathkin Park
	Woodburn 20'		Miller, J 45'; Taylor	Attendance: 4,000; Referee: Mr McNicol

23 January 1892 Quarter-final	Dumbarton	2–2	Queen's Park	Boghead Park
	Boyle; Miller, J 85'		Sellar 20'; Hamilton 40'	Attendance: 6,000; Referee: Mr Watson

30 January 1892 QF Replay	Queen's Park	4–1	Dumbarton	Hampden Park
	Hamilton 50'; Lambie 65'; Gulliland		Taylor 77'	Attendance: 15,000; Referee: Mr Watson

=== Dumbartonshire Cup ===
12 March 1892 Semi-final	Dumbarton	9–0	Methlan Park	Boghead Park
	Thomson, W 10'; Johnston 15'; Taylor; McLeod; Poulson (o.g.); McNaught; Keir

16 April 1892 Final	Dumbarton	2–0	Vale of Leven	Boghead Park
	Miller, J scrimmage			Attendance: 3,000; Referee: Mr Oliver

=== Greenock Charity Cup ===
14 May 1892 Semi-final	Dumbarton	1–0	Dykebar	Cappielow Park
	35'			Attendance: 2,000; Referee: Mr Pettigrew

28 May 1892 Final	Morton	4–1	Dumbarton	Cappielow Park
	Burns 30'; Brown 35'		Goal	Attendance: 2,000; Referee: Mr Aitken

=== Glasgow Charity Cup ===
21 May 1892 Semi-final	Celtic	3–1	Dumbarton	Ibrox Park
	McMahon 63'; McCallum 64'; McDonald 73' (o.g.)		Miller, J 44'	Attendance: 10,000; Referee: T Park

=== Friendlies/Other Matches ===
8 August 1891 Friendly	5th KRV	3–3	Dumbarton	Palmerston Park
	Morley 19'		McNaught; Bell; Miller, J

12 August 1891 Benefit	Airdrie	2–0	Dumbarton	Mavisbank Park, Airdrie
	Cullen; Addie			Attendance: 2,000

1 January 1892 Friendly	Celtic	0–8	Dumbarton	Celtic Park
			Taylor; Thomson, W Bell; McMillan; McNaught	Attendance: 15,000

2 January 1892 Friendly	Hearts	7–1	Dumbarton	Tynecastle Stadium
	Ellis 2'; Fairbairn; Taylor; Scott		Thomson, W	Attendance: 10,000; Referee: Mr Robertson

4 January 1892 Friendly	Aberdeen	1–6	Dumbarton	The Chanonry, Aberdeen
	Thomson		Thomson, W Wilson; Reid scrimmage	Attendance: 2,500; Referee: R Hyslop

== Player statistics ==
Jack Bell retained his top League topscorer title for second season in succession - scoring 19 goals.

No.	Pos	Nat	Player	Total		Scottish League		Scottish Cup	
No.	Pos	Nat	Player	Apps	Goals	Apps	Goals	Apps	Goals
	GK	(Scotland) SCO	John Barr	5	0	4	0	1	0
	GK	(Scotland) SCO	John McLeod	22	2	19	2	3	0
	DF	(Scotland) SCO	Richard Hunter	1	0	0	0	1	0
	DF	(Scotland) SCO	Alex Miller	21	0	18	0	3	0
	DF	(Scotland) SCO	Richmond	7	0	7	0	0	0
	DF	(Scotland) SCO	Alf Smith	10	0	8	0	2	0
	DF	(Scotland) SCO	Daniel Watson	9	0	7	0	2	0
	MF	(Scotland) SCO	Dickie Boyle	26	1	22	0	4	1
	MF	(Scotland) SCO	John Gillan	2	0	2	0	0	0
	MF	(Scotland) SCO	Leitch Keir	23	0	19	0	4	0
	MF	(Scotland) SCO	Alex Lang	1	0	1	0	0	0
	MF	(Scotland) SCO	Alex McDonald	9	1	9	1	0	0
	MF	(Scotland) SCO	Tom McMillan	20	3	16	3	4	0
	FW	(Scotland) SCO	Jack Bell	23	21	19	19	4	2
	FW	(Scotland) SCO	W Bell	1	0	1	0	0	0
	FW	(Scotland) SCO	Black	1	0	1	0	0	0
	FW	(Scotland) SCO	Buchan	1	0	1	0	0	0
	FW	(Scotland) SCO	James Galbraith	7	1	7	1	0	0
	FW	(Scotland) SCO	Hodge	1	0	1	0	0	0
	FW	(Scotland) SCO	John McIndewar	1	0	1	0	0	0
	FW	(Scotland) SCO	James McNaught	25	7	21	7	4	0
	FW	(Scotland) SCO	John Miller	24	17	20	14	4	3
	FW	(Scotland) SCO	John Taylor	21	18	17	14	4	4
	FW	(Scotland) SCO	William Thomson	24	6	20	6	4	0
	FW	(Scotland) SCO	A N Other	1	0	1	0	0	0

== Reserve team ==
Dumbarton reached the semi-final of the Scottish Second XI Cup before losing out to Annbank in a replay, but won their fourth successive Dumbartonshire Second XI Cup with a win over Smithston Hibs in the final.
