= 1891–92 Celtic F.C. season =

Celtic
1891–92 season
- Stadium: Celtic Park
- Scottish First Division: 2nd
- Scottish Cup: Winners

The 1891–92 season was the fourth season of football by Celtic.

This marked the second season where Celtic took part in the Scottish Football League, in which they placed second, just two points below champions Dumbarton.

They also competed in the Glasgow Merchants Charity Cup, Glasgow Cup and Scottish Cup, which they won for the first time. The final at Ibrox Park, which was originally won 1-0 by Celtic against Queen's Park, was mutually protested by both teams and so it was replayed, this time with Celtic winning 5-1. This was the first major domestic honour won by Celtic.

== Pre-season and Friendlies ==
4 August 1891 Friendly	Morton	2–5	Celtic
15:00 GMT		Celtic Report

5 August 1891 Friendly	Airdrieonians	2–2	Celtic
15:00 GMT		Celtic Report

10 August 1891 Friendly	Cowlairs	3–6	Celtic
15:00 GMT		Celtic Report

19 September 1891 Friendly	Celtic	11–1	Kelvinside Athletic
15:00 GMT		Celtic Report

1 October 1891 Friendly	Celtic	3–2	Blackburn Rovers
15:00 GMT		Celtic Report

14 November 1891 Friendly	Kilmarnock	2–2	Celtic
15:00 GMT		Celtic Report

1 January 1892 Friendly	Celtic	0–8	Dumbarton
15:00 GMT		Celtic Report

2 January 1892 Friendly	Third Lanark	1–3	Celtic
15:00 GMT		Celtic Report

4 January 1892 Friendly	Celtic	2–0	Rangers
15:00 GMT		Celtic Report

13 February 1892 Friendly	Celtic	10–0	Battlefield
15:00 GMT		Celtic Report

12 March 1892 Friendly	Celtic	1–0	Queens Park
15:00 GMT		Celtic Report

4 April 1892 Friendly	Celtic	4–1	Nottingham Forest
15:00 GMT		Celtic Report

28 May 1892 Friendly	5th KRV	1–8	Celtic
15:00 GMT		Celtic Report

== Competitions ==
=== Scottish Football League ===
==== League table ====
Pos	Team	Pld	W	D	L	GF	GA	GD	Pts	Qualification or relegation
1	Dumbarton (C)	22	18	1	3	79	28	+51	37	Champions
2	Celtic	22	16	3	3	62	21	+41	35	
3	Heart of Midlothian	22	15	4	3	65	35	+30	34	
4	Leith Athletic	22	12	1	9	51	40	+11	25	
5	Rangers	22	11	2	9	59	46	+13	24	

Rules for classification: 1) Points;
(C) Champions

==== Matches ====
15 August 1891 Football League	Heart of Midlothian	3–1	Celtic	Edinburgh
15:00 GMT		Celtic Report		Stadium: Tynecastle Park; Attendance: 4,500

22 August 1891 Football League	Celtic	3–0	Rangers	Glasgow
15:00 GMT		Celtic Report		Stadium: Celtic Park; Attendance: 12,000

29 August 1891 Football League	Clyde	2–7	Celtic	Glasgow
15:00 GMT		Celtic Report		Stadium: Barrowfield Park; Attendance: 12,500

5 September 1891 Football League	Celtic	3–0	Renton	Glasgow
15:00 GMT		Celtic Report		Stadium: Celtic Park; Attendance: 7,000

12 September 1891 Football League	Abercorn	2–5	Celtic	Abercorn
15:00 GMT		Celtic Report		Stadium: Underwood Park; Attendance: 7,000

26 September 1891 Football League	Celtic	2–0	Dumbarton	Glasgow
15:00 GMT		Celtic Report		Stadium: Celtic Park; Attendance: 12,000

3 October 1891 Football League	St. Mirren	1–2	Celtic	Paisley
15:00 GMT		Celtic Report		Stadium: Westmarch; Attendance: 5,000

17 October 1891 Football League	Celtic	3–1	Heart of Midlothian	Glasgow
15:00 GMT		Celtic Report		Stadium: Celtic Park; Attendance: 16,000

24 October 1891 Football League	Celtic	6–1	Vale of Leven	Glasgow
15:00 GMT		Celtic Report		Stadium: Celtic Park; Attendance: 7,000

5 December 1891 (Note: Stopped 15 minutes from time as no-contest to be replayed) Football League	Leith Athletic	2–2	Celtic	Leith
15:00 GMT		Celtic Report		Stadium: Bank Park

26 December 1891 Football League	Celtic	2–1	St. Mirren	Glasgow
15:00 GMT		Celtic Report		Stadium: Celtic Park; Attendance: 3,000

30 January 1892 Football League	Cambuslang	0–4	Celtic	Leith
15:00 GMT		Celtic Report		Stadium: Whitefield Park; Attendance: 3,000

27 February 1892 Football League	Celtic	5–1	Third Lanark	Glasgow
15:00 GMT		Celtic Report		Stadium: Celtic Park; Attendance: 3,000

19 March 1892 Football League	Celtic	0–0	Clyde	Glasgow
15:00 GMT		Celtic Report		Stadium: Celtic Park; Attendance: 11,000

2 April 1892 Football League	Vale of Leven	2–2	Celtic	Glasgow
15:00 GMT		Celtic Report		Stadium: Millburn Park; Attendance: 3,000

16 April 1892 Football League	Celtic	3–1	Cambuslang	Glasgow
15:00 GMT		Celtic Report		Stadium: Celtic Park; Attendance: 6,000

18 April 1892 Football League	Leith Athletic	2–1	Celtic	Leith
15:00 GMT		Celtic Report		Stadium: Bank Park; Attendance: 6,000

23 April 1892 Football League	Dumbarton	1–0	Celtic	Dumbarton
15:00 GMT		Celtic Report		Stadium: Boghead Park; Attendance: 5,500

30 April 1892 Football League	Celtic	3–1	Abercorn	Glasgow
15:00 GMT		Celtic Report		Stadium: Celtic Park; Attendance: 4,000

5 May 1892 Football League	Renton	0–4	Celtic	Renton
15:00 GMT		Celtic Report		Stadium: Tontine Park; Attendance: 3,000

7 May 1892 Football League	Rangers	1–1	Celtic	Glasgow
15:00 GMT		Celtic Report		Stadium: Ibrox Park; Attendance: 8,000

14 May 1892 Football League	Celtic	2–0	Leith Athletic	Glasgow
15:00 GMT		Celtic Report		Stadium: Celtic Park; Attendance: 3,000

24 May 1892 Football League	Third Lanark	1–3	Celtic	Glasgow
15:00 GMT		Celtic Report		Stadium: Cathkin Park; Attendance: 9,000

=== Scottish Cup ===
28 November 1891 First round	St. Mirren	2–4	Celtic	Paisley
15:00 GMT		Celtic Report		Stadium: Westmarch; Attendance: 4,000

19 December 1891 Second round	Celtic	3–0	Kilmarnock Athletic	Glasgow
15:00 GMT		Celtic Report		Stadium: Celtic Park; Attendance: 200

23 January 1892 Quarter-final	Celtic	4–1	Cowlairs	Glasgow
15:00 GMT		Celtic Report		Stadium: Celtic Park; Attendance: 4,000

6 February 1892 Semi-final	Celtic	5–3	Rangers	Glasgow
15:00 GMT		Celtic Report		Stadium: Celtic Park; Attendance: 11,000

12 March 1892 Final	Celtic	1–0	Queen's Park	Glasgow
15:00 GMT				Stadium: Ibrox Park; Attendance: 26,000

9 April 1892 Final Replay	Celtic	5–1	Queens Park	Glasgow
15:00 GMT		Celtic Report		Stadium: Ibrox Park; Attendance: 26,000

=== Glasgow Cup ===
10 October 1891 Glasgow Cup	Partick Thistle	0–3	Celtic	Glasgow
15:00 GMT		Celtic Report		Stadium: Meadowside; Attendance: 4,000

31 October 1891 (Note: Match voided after Northern protested over fog) Glasgow Cup	Celtic	6–0	Northern	Glasgow
15:00 GMT		Celtic Report		Stadium: Celtic Park; Attendance: 200

7 November 1891 Glasgow Cup	Celtic	3–2	Northern	Glasgow
15:00 GMT		Celtic Report		Stadium: Celtic Park; Attendance: 4,000

21 November 1891 Glasgow Cup	Celtic	9–2	Linthouse	Glasgow
15:00 GMT		Celtic Report		Stadium: Celtic Park; Attendance: 26,000

12 December 1891 Glasgow Cup	Celtic	7–1	Clyde	Glasgow
15:00 GMT		Celtic Report		Stadium: Celtic Park

=== Glasgow Merchants Charity Cup ===
21 May 1892 Glasgow Merchants Charity Cup	Celtic	3–1	Dumbarton	Glasgow
15:00 GMT		Celtic Report		Stadium: Celtic Park

1 June 1892 Glasgow Merchants Charity Cup	Celtic	2–0	Rangers	Glasgow
15:00 GMT		Celtic Report		Stadium: Celtic Park
