= 1892–93 Liverpool F.C. season =

English football club season

Liverpool
1892–93 season
- Manager: William Barclay; John McKenna
- Lancashire League: Champions
- FA Cup: Third qualifying round
- Top goalscorer: League: John Miller (23); All: John Miller (26)
- Average home league attendance: 2,441
Home colours	Away colours

The 1892–93 season was the first season in Liverpool Football Club's existence, and their first year in the Lancashire League and the FA Cup.

== First team ==
Name	Nationality	Date of birth (age)	Signed from	Signed in	Apps.	Goals
Goalkeepers
Sydney Ross	(Scotland)	8 June 1869 (age 24)	Cambuslang	1892	21	0
Billy McOwen	(England)	April, 1871 (age 22)	Darwen	1892	1	0
Defenders
Andrew Hannah (c)	(Scotland)	17 September 1864 (age 28)	Renton	1892	25	0
Duncan McLean	(Scotland)	20 January 1868 (age 25)	Everton	1892	25	0
James McBride	(Scotland)	30 December 1873 (age 19)	Renton	1892	23	4
John McCartney	(Scotland)	1870 (age 22–23)	St Mirren	1892	21	1
Joe McQue	(Scotland)	11 March 1873 (age 20)	Celtic	1892	20	2
Matt McQueen	(Scotland)	18 May 1863 (age 30)	Leith Athletic	1892	17	5
James Kelso	(Scotland)	8 January 1869 (age 24)	Renton	1892	1	0
Wally Richardson (Note: During one game, Liverpool were short on players. Richardson, a military player for "Kings 1st Regiment" who was the trainer of the squad, made one appearance for the team when no other players could be found.)	(England)	1870 (age 22–23)		1892	1	0
Midfielders
Hugh McQueen	(Scotland)	1 October 1867 (age 25)	Leith Athletic	1892	17	4
Andrew Kelvin	(Scotland)	1869 (age 23–24)	Kilmarnock	1892	6	0
Philip Kelly	(England)	1869 (age 23–24)		1892	3	0
Joe Pearson	(England)	1868 (age 24–25)	West Derby	1892	1	0
Forwards
Tom Wyllie	(Scotland)	5 April 1870 (age 23)	Everton	1892	25	15
John Miller	(Scotland)	1870 (age 22–23)	Dumbarton	1892	24	26
Malcolm McVean	(Scotland)	7 March 1871 (age 22)	Third Lanark	1892	24	12
John Smith	(Scotland)	1866 (age 26–27)	Sunderland	1892	11	5
Jonathan Cameron	(Scotland)		Renton	1892	9	5
Arthur Worgan	(England)	1871 (age 21–22)		1892	0	0

== Transfers ==
=== In ===
Pos	Player	From	Fee	Date
FW	(Scotland) Malcolm McVean	(Scotland) Third Lanark	Unknown	07-1892
DF	(Scotland) Joe McQue	(Scotland) Celtic	Unknown	08-1892
GK	(England) Billy McOwen	(England) Darwen	Unknown	25-07-1892
DF	(Scotland) Duncan McLean	(England) Everton	Unknown	07-1892
DF	(Scotland) James McBride	(Scotland) Renton	Unknown	06-1892
DF	(Scotland) Andrew Hannah	(Scotland) Renton	Unknown	05-1892
FW	(Scotland) Tom Wyllie	(England) Everton	Unknown	05-1892
FW	(Scotland) John Miller	(Scotland) Dumbarton	Unknown	05-1892
GK	(Scotland) Sidney Ross	(Scotland) Cambuslang	Unknown	06-1892
DF	(Scotland) James Kelso	(Scotland) Renton	Unknown	05-1892
MF	(Scotland) Arthur Kelvin	(Scotland) Kilmarnock	Unknown	06-1892
FW	(Scotland) Jonathan Cameron	(England) Aston Villa	Unknown	05-1892
DF	(Scotland) Matt McQueen	(Scotland) Leith Athletic	Unknown	23-10-1892
MF	(Scotland) Hugh McQueen	(Scotland) Leith Athletic	Unknown	23-10-1892
DF	(Scotland) John McCartney	(Scotland) St Mirren	Unknown	10-1892

== Friendlies ==
1 September 1892 Friendly	Liverpool	7–1	Rotherham Town F.C.	Liverpool
	Miller; Kelvin; McQue; Wyllie	Report	Leatherbarrow	Stadium: Anfield; Attendance: 1,000; Referee: Walter Sugg

5 September 1892 Friendly	Middlesbrough Ironopolis	5–0	Liverpool	Middlesbrough
	Coupar; Hughes	Report		Stadium: Paradise Ground; Attendance: 2,000

8 September 1892 Friendly	Liverpool	2–0	Barrow	Liverpool
	McVean; Wyllie	Report		Stadium: Anfield; Attendance: 600

10 September 1892 Friendly	Liverpool	2–1	Stockton	Liverpool
	McVean; Wyllie	Report	McClung	Stadium: Anfield; Attendance: 6,702

15 September 1892 Friendly	Liverpool	3–1	Grantham Rovers	Liverpool
	Glen; McVean	Report	Joe Chamberlain	Stadium: Anfield; Attendance: 700

22 September 1892 Friendly	Liverpool	1–2	Middlesbrough Ironopolis	Liverpool
	Smith 2'	Report	Hughes; McArthur	Stadium: Anfield; Attendance: 2,000

26 September 1892 Friendly	Stoke	2–1	Liverpool	Stoke-on-Trent
	Evans 4'; Schofield 90'	Report	(unknown) 80'	Stadium: Victoria Ground; Attendance: 2,000

29 September 1892 Friendly	Liverpool	1–0	Queen of the South Wanderers	Liverpool
	Miller 55'	Report		Stadium: Anfield; Attendance: 800

6 October 1892 Friendly	Glasgow Rangers	6–1	Liverpool	Ibrox
	Kerr; H. McCreadie; A. McCreadie; Martin	Report	McVean	Stadium: Ibrox Park; Attendance: 6,000; Referee: A. McLean

14 November 1892 Friendly	Aston Villa	2–3	Liverpool	Perry Barr
	Campbell; Davis	Report	McVean; Miller; McQueen	Stadium: Liverpool; Attendance: 3,000; Referee: Mr. Ford

10 December 1892 Friendly	Heywood Central	1–1	Liverpool	Heywood
	Jack Horsfield 57'	Report	Miller 55'	Stadium: Bamford Road; Attendance: 1,000. Referee: D. Hammond

26 December 1892 Friendly	Liverpool	1–0	Sheffield United	Liverpool
	Wyllie	Report		Stadium: Anfield; Attendance: 6,000; Referee: Mr. Churchill

27 December 1892 Friendly	Southport Central	2–2	Liverpool	Southport
	Hamer; Davenport	Report	Wyllie; McVean 30'	Stadium: Scarisbrick New Road; Attendance: 500

21 January 1893 Friendly	Bury	0–0	Liverpool	Bury
		Report		Stadium: Gigg Lane; Attendance: 3,000; Referee: J. Cooper

4 February 1893 Friendly	Liverpool	1–2	Stoke	Liverpool
	Miller	Report	Naughton 3'; Baker	Stadium: Anfield; Attendance: 1,000

14 February 1893 Friendly	Rotherham Town	2–2	Liverpool	Rotherham
	Longden 44'; Leather 60'	Report	McQueen 35'; Thickitt 80' (o.g.)	Stadium: Clifton Grove; Attendance: 2,500; Referee: J. Fox

23 February 1893 Friendly	Liverpool	0–0	Stoke	Liverpool
		Report		Stadium: Anfield; Attendance: 1,500; Referee: Mr. Churchill

9 March 1893 Friendly	Liverpool	1–3	Aston Villa	Liverpool
	McQueen 15'	Report	Skea	Stadium: Anfield; Attendance: 2,000

31 March 1893 Friendly	Liverpool	1–0	Darwen	Liverpool
	Wyllie	Report		Stadium: Anfield; Attendance: 5,000

1 April 1893 Friendly	Stockton	2–2	Liverpool	Stockton-on-Tees
	Townley; McClung	Report	McVean 1'; Miller 10'	Stadium: Victoria Ground; Attendance: 2,000. Referee: R. Peel

3 April 1893 Friendly	Liverpool	2–0	Corinthians	Liverpool
	Miller; McQueen	Report		Stadium: Anfield; Attendance: 3,500; Referee: J. Lewis

4 April 1893 Friendly	Liverpool	4–1	Cliftonville	Liverpool
	McQueen; Miller; Smith	Report	Stanfield	Stadium: Anfield; Attendance: 1,500

8 April 1893 Friendly	Newcastle United	0–0	Liverpool	Newcastle upon Tyne
		Report		Stadium: St James' Park; Attendance: 1,000; Referee: R. Campbell

10 April 1893 Friendly	Newtown	0–0	Liverpool	Newtown
		Report		Stadium: The Cunnings; Attendance: 2,000; Referee: H. Hibbott

24 April 1893 Friendly	Liverpool	1–1	Bolton Wanderers	Liverpool
	McQueen	Report	Tannahill	Stadium: Anfield; Attendance: 1,500

25 April 1893 Friendly	Liverpool	0–0	Preston North End	Liverpool
		Report		Stadium: Anfield; Attendance: 1,000; Referee: Mr Gough

26 April 1893 Friendly	Liverpool	1–3	Rest of the Lancashire League	Liverpool
	Wyllie	Report	Willie Barbour; Hogan; Hannah (o.g.)	Stadium: Anfield; Attendance: 3,000; Referee: James Cooper

27 April 1893 Friendly	Liverpool	0–1	Blackburn Rovers	Liverpool
		Report	Hall	Stadium: Anfield

29 April 1893 Friendly	Bootle	2–2	Liverpool	Bootle
	T. Carthy	Report	McVean; Wyllie	Stadium: Hawthorne Road; Attendance: 1,000

== Testimonials ==
23 March 1893 Daniel Kirkwood	Liverpool	1–0	Bootle	Liverpool
	Miller	Report		Stadium: Anfield; Attendance: 2,000
Note: Benefit Match for Daniel Kirkwood.

== Competitions ==
Win Draw Loss

=== Lancashire League ===
Pos	Team	Pld	W	D	L	GF	GA	GR	Pts
1	Liverpool	22	17	2	3	66	19	3.474	36
2	Blackpool	22	17	2	3	82	31	2.645	36
3	Bury	22	17	1	4	83	24	3.458	35

3 September 1892 1	Liverpool	8–0	Higher Walton	Liverpool
	Smith 15'; McBride; McVean; Cameron; McQue	Report		Stadium: Anfield; Attendance: 300

9 September 1892 2	Liverpool	4–0	Bury	Liverpool
	Miller 5'; Cameron; McVean	Report		Stadium: Anfield; Attendance: 3,000

1 October 1892 3	Liverpool	3–1	West Manchester	Liverpool
	Wyllie; Smith 85'; Miller 89'	Report	Bogie	Stadium: Anfield; Attendance: 1,000

22 October 1892 4	Higher Walton	0–5	Liverpool	Higher Walton
		Report	Miller; Wyllie	Stadium: Moon's Mill; Attendance: 150

5 November 1892 5	Blackpool	3–0	Liverpool	Blackpool
	John Parkinson; James Pittaway	Report		Stadium: Raikes Hall; Attendance: 3,000; Referee: Lomax

12 November 1892 6	Fleetwood Rangers	1–4	Liverpool	Fleetwood
	Brogan	Report	Miller 4'; McVean; Smith	Stadium: The Copse; Attendance: 2,000

26 November 1892 7	Rossendale	0–2	Liverpool	Newchurch
		Report	McBride; Miller	Stadium: Dark Lane; Attendance: 1,500

3 December 1892 8	Liverpool	7–0	Fleetwood Rangers	Liverpool
	McQueen; McVean; Miller	Report		Stadium: Anfield; Attendance: 2,000

17 December 1892 9	Liverpool	0–2	Blackpool	Liverpool
		Report	James Pittaway; William Marsden	Stadium: Anfield; Attendance: 6,000

24 December 1892 10	South Shore	0–1	Liverpool	Blackpool
		Report	Wyllie	Stadium: Bloomfield Road; Attendance: 2,000

31 December 1892 11	Liverpool	6–2	Heywood Central	Liverpool
	McQueen; McVean; Miller; Wyllie	Report	J. Pearson; E. Jones (pen.)	Stadium: Anfield; Attendance: 2,000

2 January 1893 12	Fairfield	1–4	Liverpool	Fairfield
	(unknown)	Report	Cameron; McQueen; Miller; Wyllie	Stadium: Grassmoor Road; Attendance: 3,000

7 January 1893 13	Heywood Central	1–2	Liverpool	Heywood
	T. Woolfall	Report	McBride; Wyllie	Stadium: Bamford Road; Attendance: 1,000; Referee: W. Smalley

14 January 1893 14	West Manchester	0–0	Liverpool	Manchester
		Report		Stadium: Brook's Bar; Attendance: 3,000

11 February 1893 15	Bury	3–0	Liverpool	Bury
	Willie Barbour; Plant	Report		Stadium: Gigg Lane; Attendance: 8,000

18 February 1893 16	Nelson	2–3	Liverpool	Nelson
	Ross (o.g.); James Fairbairn	Report	McVean; Miller	Stadium: Seedhill; Attendance: 1,500

25 February 1893 17	Liverpool	2–0	Southport Central	Liverpool
	McQueen; McBride	Report		Stadium: Anfield; Attendance: 3,000

4 March 1893 18	Liverpool	3–0	Nelson	Liverpool
	H. McQueen; M. McQueen 47'	Report		Stadium: Anfield; Attendance: 2,000

16 March 1893 19	Liverpool	5–0	Fairfield	Liverpool
	McLean; McQueen; Miller; Wyllie	Report		Stadium: Anfield; Attendance: 2,000

18 March 1893 20	Liverpool	4–0	South Shore	Liverpool
	Wyllie 5'; McVean; Miller	Report		Stadium: Anfield; Attendance: 2,000

25 March 1893 21	Liverpool	2–1	Rossendale	Liverpool
	Smith; McVean	Report	J. Ireland	Stadium: Anfield; Attendance: 2,000

15 April 1893 22	Southport Central	1–1	Liverpool	Southport
	William Hastings	Report	Miller 20'	Stadium: Scarisbrick New Road; Attendance: 1,500

=== F.A. Cup ===
15 October 1892 Q1	Nantwich	0–4	Liverpool	Nantwich
		Report	Wyllie 70'; Miller 75', 80', 85'	Stadium: Jackson Avenue; Attendance: 700; Referee: J. Taylor

29 October 1892 Q2	Liverpool	9–0	Newtown	Liverpool
	McCartney; Wyllie; Townsend (o.g.); Mcvean 45'; McQueen; Cameron	Report		Stadium: Anfield; Attendance: 4,000

19 November 1892 Q3	Northwich Victoria	2–1	Liverpool	Northwich
	Fecitt	Report	Wyllie 10'	Stadium: Drill Field; Attendance: 1,000; Referee: J. Lewis

=== Lancashire Senior Cup ===
17 September 1892 Q1	Liverpool	2–0	Southport Central	Liverpool
	Smith 55'; Kelvin 90'	Report		Stadium: Anfield; Attendance: 4,000

8 October 1892 Q2	West Manchester	1–3	Liverpool	Manchester
	Pickering 70'	Report	Miller; Kelvin 88'	Stadium: Brook's Bar; Attendance: 2,500

28 January 1893 1	Liverpool	1–0	Darwen	Liverpool
	McVean 8'	Report		Stadium: Anfield; Attendance: 8,000; Referee: W.H. Stacey

11 March 1893 2	Bootle	2–1	Liverpool	Bootle
	Gallacher	Report	McQueen	Stadium: Hawthorne Road; Attendance: 5,000

=== Liverpool Senior Cup ===
22 March 1893 1	Liverpool	4–0	Chester	Liverpool
	Cameron 10'; McQueen; Hannah; McVean	Report		Stadium: Anfield; Attendance: 2,000; Referee: Tom Armitt

17 April 1893 SF	Liverpool	1–0	Bootle	Liverpool
	Miller	Report		Stadium: Anfield; Attendance: 5,000; Referee: W.H. Gough

22 April 1893 F	Liverpool	1–0	Everton	Bootle
	Wyllie 35'	Report		Stadium: Hawthorne Road; Attendance: 10,000; Referee: Herbie Arthur
