= Keith Peters =

Keith Peters may refer to:

- Keith Peters (rugby league) (born 1986), Papua New Guinean rugby league player
- Keith Peters (physician) (born 1938), Regius Professor of Physic at Cambridge University
- Keith Peters (footballer) (born 1915), former English footballer
