= Liverpool F.C. league record by opponent =

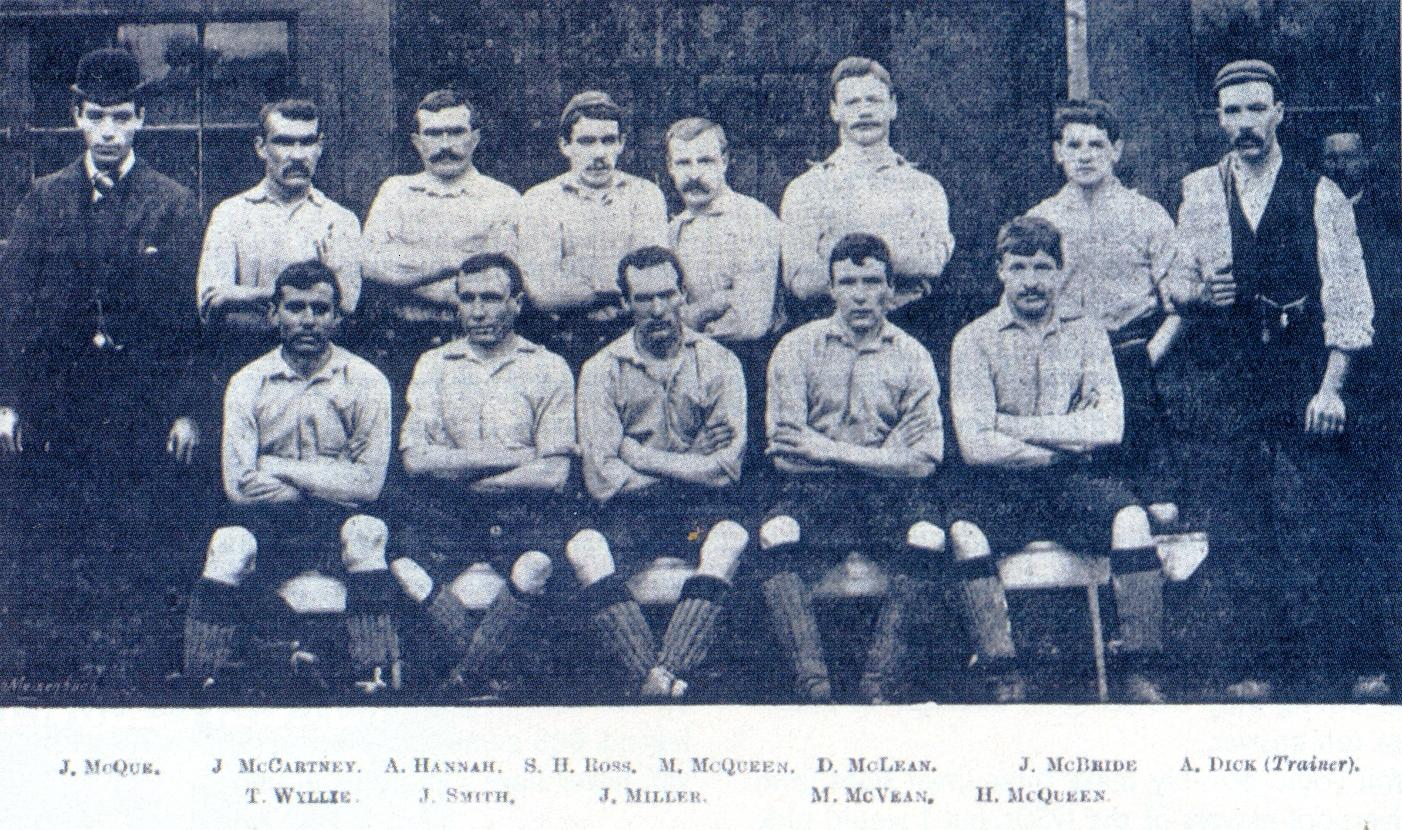
Liverpool's team during its first season, 1892–93

Liverpool Football Club is an English association football club based in Liverpool, Merseyside, which competes in the top tier of English football, for the 2026–27 season. The club was formed in 1892 following a disagreement between the board of Everton and club president John Houlding, who owned the club's ground, Anfield. The dispute over rent resulted in Everton leaving Anfield for Goodison Park, which left Houlding with an empty stadium. Not content for his ground to lay idle, he created his own club: Liverpool. Liverpool joined the Lancashire League on their foundation before the 1892–93 season. They ended their inaugural season as league champions, and were elected to The Football League soon afterwards. The club remained in The Football League until 1992, when its First Division was superseded as English football's top level by the newly formed Premier League.

Liverpool's first team have competed in several nationally and regionally contested leagues, and their record against each club faced in these competitions is listed below. The team that Liverpool have met most in league competition is Everton, against whom they have contested 214 league matches; having drawn 70 of these, Everton are the side Liverpool have drawn with most in league competition. The team most often beaten by Liverpool in league competition are Aston Villa; the Anfield club have beaten them 96 times out of 195 meetings. Manchester United have recorded the most league victories over Liverpool, with 71 wins.

== Key ==
- The records include the results of matches played in the Lancashire League (from 1892 to 1893), The Football League (from 1893 to 1992) and the Premier League (from 1992 to the present day). Wartime matches are regarded as unofficial and are excluded, as are matches from the abandoned 1939–40 season.
- For the sake of simplicity, present-day names are used throughout: for example, results against Newton Heath, Leicester Fosse and Woolwich Arsenal are integrated into the records against Manchester United, Leicester City and Arsenal, respectively.
- The season given as the "first" denotes the season in which Liverpool first played a league match against that team.
- The season given as the "last" denotes the season in which Liverpool last played a league match against that team.
- † Teams with this background and symbol in the "Club" column are current divisional rivals of Liverpool.
- ‡ Clubs with this background and symbol in the "Club" column are defunct.
- Pld = matches played; W = matches won; D = matches drawn; L = matches lost; Win% = percentage of total matches won

== All-time league record ==
Statistics correct as of match played 8 November 2026.

Liverpool F.C. league record by opponent
Club	Pld	W	D	L	Pld	W	D	L	Pld	W	D	L	Win%	First	Last	Notes
Club	Home				Away				Total				Win%	First	Last	Notes
Arsenal †	103	56	22	25	102	24	35	43	205	80	57	68	39.02	1893–94	2026–27	(Note: Record against Woolwich Arsenal included.)
Aston Villa †	98	61	20	17	98	35	23	40	196	96	43	57	48.98	1894–95	2025–26	
Barnsley	6	3	2	1	6	4	0	2	12	7	2	3	58.33	1904–05	1997–98	
Birmingham City	50	32	11	7	50	15	14	21	100	47	25	28	47.00	1893–94	2010–11	(Note: Record against Small Heath included; record against Birmingham included.)
Blackburn Rovers	64	38	17	9	64	16	22	26	128	54	39	35	42.19	1894–95	2011–12	
Blackpool	22	10	5	7	22	8	4	10	44	18	9	17	40.91	1892–93	2010–11	
Bolton Wanderers	59	33	16	10	59	20	13	26	118	53	29	36	44.92	1894–95	2011–12	
Bournemouth †	9	8	1	0	10	7	0	3	19	15	1	3	78.95	2015–16	2026–27	
Bradford City	13	11	0	2	13	7	2	4	26	18	2	6	69.23	1904–05	2000–01	
Bradford Park Avenue	3	1	1	1	3	2	0	1	6	3	1	2	50.00	1914–15	1920–21	
Brentford †	10	6	3	1	11	5	2	4	21	11	5	5	52.38	1935–36	2026–27	
Brighton & Hove Albion †	18	13	3	2	17	6	7	4	35	19	10	6	54.29	1958–59	2026–27	
Bristol City	15	11	1	3	15	5	2	8	30	16	3	11	53.33	1904–05	1979–80	
Bristol Rovers	8	7	0	1	8	3	1	4	16	10	1	5	62.50	1954–55	1961–62	
Burnley	47	25	13	9	47	19	9	19	94	44	22	28	46.81	1894–95	2025–26	
Burton Swifts ‡	2	2	0	0	2	1	1	0	4	3	1	0	75.00	1893–94	1895–96	
Burton United ‡	1	1	0	0	1	0	0	1	2	1	0	1	50.00	1904–05	1904–05	
Burton Wanderers ‡	1	1	0	0	1	0	0	1	2	1	0	1	50.00	1895–96	1895–96	
Bury	25	17	7	1	25	10	7	8	50	27	14	9	54.00	1892–93	1961–62	
Cardiff City	15	8	0	7	14	4	2	9	29	11	2	16	37.93	1921–22	2018–19	
Carlisle United	1	1	0	0	1	1	0	0	2	2	0	0	100.00	1974–75	1974–75	
Charlton Athletic	28	16	6	6	28	13	2	13	56	29	8	19	51.79	1936–37	2006–07	
Chelsea †	83	50	21	12	83	22	20	41	166	72	41	53	43.37	1907–08	2025–26	
Chesterfield	1	1	0	0	1	0	1	0	2	1	1	0	50.00	1904–05	1904–05	
Coventry City †	34	26	5	3	34	13	11	10	68	39	16	13	57.35	1967–68	2000–01	
Crewe Alexandra	2	2	0	0	2	2	0	0	4	4	0	0	100.00	1893–94	1895–96	
Crystal Palace †	26	17	4	5	27	15	6	6	53	32	10	11	60.38	1969–70	2026–27	
Darwen	1	0	1	0	1	1	0	0	2	1	1	0	50.00	1895–96	1895–96	
Derby County	63	42	15	6	63	24	13	26	126	66	28	32	52.38	1894–95	2007–08	
Doncaster Rovers	5	4	0	1	5	1	2	2	10	5	2	3	50.00	1904–05	1957–58	
Everton †	107	50	33	24	107	35	37	35	214	85	70	59	39.72	1894–95	2025–26	
Fairfield Athletic ‡	1	1	0	0	1	1	0	0	2	2	0	0	100.00	1892–93	1892–93	
Fleetwood Rangers ‡	1	1	0	0	1	1	0	0	2	2	0	0	100.00	1892–93	1892–93	
Fulham †	34	23	9	2	33	14	9	10	67	37	18	12	55.22	1949–50	2026–27	
Gainsborough Trinity	1	1	0	0	1	1	0	0	2	2	0	0	100.00	1904–05	1904–05	
Glossop North End	2	1	1	0	2	2	0	0	4	3	1	0	75.00	1899–1900	1904–05	(Note: Record against Glossop included.)
Grimsby Town	18	13	5	0	18	5	5	8	36	18	10	8	50.00	1893–94	1958–59	
Heywood Central ‡	1	1	0	0	1	1	0	0	2	2	0	0	100.00	1892–93	1892–93	
Higher Walton ‡	1	1	0	0	1	1	0	0	2	2	0	0	100.00	1892–93	1892–93	
Huddersfield Town	36	14	10	12	36	15	7	14	72	29	17	26	40.28	1920–21	2018–19	
Hull City †	8	6	2	0	8	3	2	3	16	9	4	3	56.25	1954–55	2016–17	
Ipswich Town †	31	21	8	2	32	10	11	11	63	31	19	13	49.21	1954–55	2025–26	
Leeds United †	54	34	12	8	54	21	16	17	108	55	28	25	50.93	1924–25	2025–26	
Leicester City	54	32	11	11	54	18	10	26	108	50	21	37	46.30	1895–96	2024–25	(Note: Record against Leicester Fosse included.)
Leyton Orient	7	6	1	0	7	3	1	3	14	9	2	3	64.29	1956–57	1962–63	
Lincoln City	10	7	1	2	10	4	3	3	20	11	4	5	55.00	1893–94	1960–61	
Loughborough ‡	1	1	0	0	1	1	0	0	2	2	0	0	100.00	1895–96	1895–96	
Luton Town	15	9	6	0	15	5	4	6	30	14	10	6	46.67	1954–55	2023–24	
Manchester City †	91	54	21	16	90	31	26	33	181	85	47	49	46.96	1893–94	2026–27	(Note: Record against Ardwick included.)
Manchester United †	93	43	24	26	93	19	29	45	186	62	53	71	33.33	1895–96	2025–26	(Note: Record against Newton Heath included.)
Middlesbrough	68	38	17	13	68	21	22	25	136	59	39	38	43.38	1902–03	2016–17	
Middlesbrough Ironopolis ‡	1	1	0	0	1	1	0	0	2	2	0	0	100.00	1893–94	1893–94	
Millwall	2	1	1	0	2	2	0	0	4	3	1	0	75.00	1988–89	1989–90	
Nelson	1	1	0	0	1	1	0	0	2	2	0	0	100.00	1892–93	1892–93	
Newcastle United †	89	61	17	11	90	29	28	33	179	90	45	44	50.28	1893–94	2026–27	
Northampton Town	1	1	0	0	1	0	1	0	2	1	1	0	50.00	1965–66	1965–66	
Northwich Victoria	1	1	0	0	1	1	0	0	2	2	0	0	100.00	1893–94	1893–94	
Norwich City	29	19	6	4	29	15	7	7	58	34	13	11	58.62	1960–61	2021–22	
Nottingham Forest †	55	37	9	9	54	17	17	20	109	54	26	29	49.54	1894–95	2025–26	
Notts County	30	23	5	2	30	11	7	12	60	34	12	14	56.67	1893–94	1991–92	
Oldham Athletic	12	9	1	2	12	5	3	4	24	14	4	6	58.33	1910–11	1993–94	
Oxford United	3	3	0	0	3	2	1	0	6	5	1	0	83.33	1985–86	1987–88	
Plymouth Argyle	5	3	2	0	5	2	1	2	10	5	3	2	50.00	1954–55	1961–62	
Portsmouth	30	16	10	4	30	9	5	16	60	25	15	20	41.67	1927–28	2009–10	
Port Vale	6	5	1	0	6	2	2	2	12	7	3	2	58.33	1893–94	1956–57	(Note: Record against Burslem Port Vale included.)
Preston North End	32	18	8	6	32	8	9	15	64	26	17	21	40.63	1894–95	1961–62	
Queens Park Rangers	23	20	2	1	23	13	4	6	46	33	6	7	71.74	1968–69	2014–15	
Reading	3	3	0	0	3	1	1	1	6	4	1	1	66.67	2006–07	2012–13	^{[F]}
Rossendale ‡	1	1	0	0	1	1	0	0	2	2	0	0	100.00	1892–93	1892–93	
Rotherham Town ‡	2	2	0	0	2	2	0	0	4	4	0	0	100.00	1893–94	1895–96	
Rotherham United	8	8	0	0	8	2	3	3	16	10	3	3	62.50	1954–55	1961–62	
Scunthorpe United	4	4	0	0	4	2	2	0	8	6	2	0	75.00	1958–59	1961–62	
Sheffield United	62	41	12	9	62	20	15	27	124	61	27	36	49.19	1894–95	2023–24	
Sheffield Wednesday	58	36	9	13	58	18	17	23	116	54	26	36	46.55	1894–95	1999–2000	
Southampton	49	33	11	5	49	18	11	20	98	51	22	25	52.04	1960–61	2024–25	
Southport	1	1	0	0	1	0	1	0	2	1	1	0	50.00	1892–93	1892–93	(Note: Record against Southport Central included.)
South Shore ‡	1	1	0	0	1	1	0	0	2	2	0	0	100.00	1892–93	1892–93	
Stoke City	63	47	13	3	63	16	20	27	126	63	33	30	50.00	1894–95	2017–18	(Note: Record against Stoke included.)
Sunderland †	81	40	23	18	81	33	15	33	162	73	38	51	45.06	1894–95	2025–26	
Swansea City	17	13	3	1	17	4	4	9	34	17	7	10	50.00	1954–55	2017–18	(Note: Record against Swansea Town included.)
Swindon Town	1	0	1	0	1	1	0	0	2	1	1	0	50.00	1993–94	1993–94	
Tottenham Hotspur †	83	53	24	6	83	28	18	37	166	81	42	43	48.80	1909–10	2025–26	
Walsall	2	2	0	0	2	0	2	0	4	2	2	0	50.00	1893–94	1961–62	(Note: Record against Walsall Town Swifts included.)
Watford	14	13	0	1	14	8	2	4	28	21	2	5	75.00	1982–83	2021–22	
West Bromwich Albion	67	36	20	11	67	26	20	21	134	62	40	32	46.27	1894–95	2020–21	
West Ham United	68	48	16	4	68	29	17	22	136	77	33	26	56.62	1923–24	2025–26	
West Manchester ‡	1	1	0	0	1	0	1	0	2	1	1	0	50.00	1892–93	1892–93	
Wigan Athletic	8	5	2	1	8	4	3	1	16	9	5	2	56.25	2005–06	2012–13	
Wimbledon ‡	14	6	5	3	14	5	5	4	28	11	10	7	39.29	1986–87	1999–2000	(Note: Wimbledon relocated to Milton Keynes in 2003 and were rebranded as Milton Keynes Dons F.C. the following year. The club renounced all claims to Wimbledon's history in 2007, and have since regarded themselves as a new club founded in 2004.)
Wolverhampton Wanderers †	55	39	7	9	55	22	10	23	110	61	17	32	55.45	1894–95	2025–26	

== Overall record ==
Statistics correct as of 8 November 2026.

Liverpool F.C. overall league record by competition
Competition	Pld	W	D	L	Pld	W	D	L	Pld	W	D	L	GF	GA	Win%	Ref(s)
Competition	Home				Away				Total						Win%	Ref(s)
Premier League (Tier-One)	657	417	157	84	657	282	166	208	1,314	699	323	292	2,345	1,340	53.20	
Football League First Division (Tier-One)	1,548	924	354	270	1,548	483	415	650	3,096	1,407	769	920	5,094	3,956	45.45	
Football League Second Division (Tier-Two)	214	162	32	20	214	81	50	83	428	243	82	103	977	571	56.78	
Lancashire League (Tier-Two; unofficial)	11	10	0	1	11	7	2	2	22	17	2	3	66	19	77.27	
Total	2,430	1,513	543	375	2,430	853	633	943		2,364	1,176	1,318	8,482	5,885	48.64	
