= Billy McOwen =

English footballer (1871–1950)

Personal information
- Full name: William Arthur McOwen
- Date of birth: 1 April 1871
- Place of birth: Blackburn, England
- Date of death: 1950 (aged 78–79)
- Position: Goalkeeper

Senior career*
Years	Team	Apps	(Gls)
1886	Cherry Tree		
1886–1888	Blackburn Olympic		
1888–1889	Blackburn Rovers	14	(0)
1889–1892	Darwen	17	(0)
1892–1894	Liverpool	23	(0)
1894–1895	Blackpool		
1895	Nelson		
- * Club domestic league appearances and goals

William McOwen, known as Billy McOwen, (1 April 1871 – 1950) was an English footballer who played in the Football League for Blackburn Rovers, Darwen and Liverpool.

== Early career ==
Billy McOwen signed for Cherry Tree F.C. ( no records can be found about this club) as a Youth Player (Age 15) in 1886. McOwen was not at Cherry Tree FC for long (months) as he signed for Blackburn Olympic. The club were in decline as they could not compete with Blackburn Rovers. McOwen joined Rovers in 1888.

== 1888-1889 ==
Billy McOwen became the next player to assist Blackburn Rovers' with their mid-season goalkeeping crisis. He made his Football League debut on 12 January 1889, at Leamington Road, Blackburn, when he was 'between the sticks" for Rovers against "The Invincibles", Preston North End. The match, according to a Lancaster Gazette journalist, was "thrilling". Rovers gave as good as they got but in each half had to chase and get an equaliser. McOwen did well in goal and made some smart saves. Rovers nearly won it at the end but the Referee ruled that the ball had gone out of play before Rovers scored. It finished 2-2. McOwen had kept goal on 5 occasions by the end of the season and kept two clean sheets. Rovers finished the season in 4th place.

== Liverpool FC ==
McOwen joined Liverpool in July 1892. The Blackburn Standard reported on 30 July: Many supporters of the Darwen Football Club will regret to hear that W McOwen, the former goalkeeper, has severed his connection with the club. Some time ago the committee engaged Chalmers, the Middlesbrough goalkeeper, and it was thought that the club would retain the services of the little champion from Blackburn. McOwen has, however, obtained his release from the club in the "Salmon Town", and signed for the Liverpool club. The popular custodian was formally transferred by the Darwen committee on Monday last.

He was not a regular in Liverpool's inaugural 1892–93 season — the preference being Sidney Ross — but he was their first-ever goalkeeper for a Football League match, when the Reds opened their 1893–94 Second Division campaign at Middlesbrough Ironopolis on 2 September 1893. He played in 23 of their 28 League fixtures that season, at the end of which Liverpool were crowned champions and promoted to First Division. McOwen, however, did not play for them again, preferring to take up a career in dentistry because it paid better.
