= Oldham County A.F.C. =

Former association football club from Lancashire

Oldham County
- Full name: Oldham County Association Football Club
- Nickname(s): County, the Counts
- Founded: 1895
- Dissolved: 1897
- Ground: Athletic Ground
- Secretaries: W. Clarkson (financial), J. Jones (correspondence)
- Chairman: J. Dyson

Oldham County Association Football Club was an association football club from Oldham, Lancashire, active in the 1890s.

== History ==
The club was formed in 1895, to bring the association code to a rugby union town, and it was admitted to The Combination for the 1895–96 season. The new club got off to a promising start, 4,000 spectators turning up to a narrow home defeat to Everton reserves. It finished the season 4th out of 8 clubs.

The season had been however a financial disaster, the club running a loss of £235 after gate receipts added up to £317 but player wages ran to £277. Before the 1896–97 season, a new limited liability company, the Oldham County Football and Athletic Company Limited, was formed, with proposed capital of £4,000, to take over the assets and liabilities of the A.F.C., with the aim of building a new ground, adding tracks for trotting, cycling, and athletics. The club stepped up to the higher standard Lancashire League and enjoyed a mid-table finish. It also had a decent run in the 1896–97 FA Cup qualifying rounds, winning through two ties before going down to Nelson at the third stage.

However the club struggled with finances off-field, the cost of the new ground proving crippling. In October 1896, a toxic dispute broke out players and club. Seven players went on strike claiming they had not been given promised written contract, or part-time jobs to supplement their pay, and they had not received their winning bonuses; the directors denied these allegations, but the club's season was derailed. Later in the year, the wife of a previous club secretary successfully sued the club for the return of £10 which she had lent at the start of the season.

Despite this, the club planned to apply to join the Football League at the end of the 1896–97 season, but the application was hopeless, and the club came crashing down in November 1897. After landscape gardener J. J. Ashton presented a winding-up against the club for his £550 fees for designing the Athletic Ground, it withdrew from the Lancashire League, two directors were made bankrupt at the end of the month, and the club was formally wound up on 9 December. By 1900, most of the club directors, who were mostly working men on minimal wages, had been made bankrupt, as they had guaranteed Ashton's fees.

== Ground ==
The club's ground in its first season was at West Hulme. In 1896, after a plan to buy a ground off Chadderton Street had foundered, the club laid out a new ground, the Athletic Ground; after the club's liquidation, it was taken over by Pine Villa F.C., which was in the process of changing its name to Oldham Athletic, and the new club changed the ground's name to Boundary Park.

== Notable players ==
- W. H. Sharpe, who also played for Notts County and Woolwich Arsenal.
- Former international Michael Whitham, John Gourlay, and Charlie Bannister were all recruited for the ill-fated 1897–98 season.
