= Phil Kelly (artist) =

Irish artist (1950–2010)

Phil Kelly (7 September 1950 – 1 August 2010) was an Irish painter known for his expressionist depictions of urban environments, particularly Mexico City. After gaining recognition in Mexico during the 1990s, he exhibited widely in Mexico, Ireland and the United Kingdom. His work is held in several public and private collections, and he became a naturalised Mexican citizen in 1999.

== Early life and education ==
Kelly was born in Dublin, Ireland, and was the younger of two sons. His family moved to Birmingham, England, during his early childhood, although he maintained strong personal ties to Ireland. He attended Rugby School before being expelled, and going on Brathay Exploration Group trip to Western Kenya. When returned, he continued his studies in Bath.

In the 1970s he lived in a number of locations, including London, Portugal and Whitby in North Yorkshire, while attempting to establish himself as a professional artist. During this period he supported himself through various jobs, including van driving, farm work and teaching. From 1974 to 1981 he exhibited intermittently in small galleries in the United Kingdom and in Portugal.

== Career ==
=== Move to Mexico and stylistic development ===
Kelly first travelled to Mexico in 1982. Prior to this, his work had been influenced by European painters such as Lucian Freud, Frank Auerbach and Jack Yeats, with a focus on landscapes characteristic of Northern Europe. Exposure to Mexico’s climate, light and urban environment significantly influenced his artistic development. He remained in Mexico for three years.

While he was abroad in the mid-1980s, the 1985 Mexico City earthquake destroyed his former apartment and resulted in the death of his partner, along with the loss of many of his early works. Kelly subsequently returned to London, where he continued teaching and exhibiting in small venues.

=== Return to Mexico and career expansion ===
Kelly relocated permanently to Mexico in 1989. In 1990 he married arts administrator Ruth Munguía, who later managed aspects of his professional career. The 1990s marked increased public recognition, with regular exhibitions in Mexico City and occasional shows in London. Works were auctioned at Christie’s in 1991 and 1992.

In 1996, Kelly held a solo exhibition at the Museo de Arte Contemporáneo in Mexico City titled Babel Descifrada. The exhibition generated discussion in the Mexican press and contributed to his growing profile. That same year he exhibited at the Westbourne Gallery in London and at the Hay Festival of Literature and Arts.

Kelly’s first solo exhibition in Ireland took place at the Frederick Gallery, Dublin, in 1997, supported by the Mexican ambassador to Ireland. Subsequent exhibitions included collaborations with Hillsboro Fine Art. He also produced commissioned works for Rick Stein’s Seafood Restaurant in Cornwall.

Through the 1990s, Kelly became an unofficial cultural attache of the Irish embassy in Mexico, with then-ambassador Daniel Dultzin recommending Irish visitors to Mexico visit Kelly. Kelly became a Mexican citizen in 1999.

== Artistic style and themes ==
Kelly is primarily associated with expressionist urban painting. His work frequently depicts Mexico City, including its streets, buildings, vegetation and distinctive taxis. He also produced figurative works, seascapes (notably from Cornwall and Mexico), landscapes from Ireland and Oaxaca, and a substantial number of ink drawings.

Characteristic features of his work include energetic brushwork, saturated colour, and a focus on the visual intensity of urban environments. Critics have noted his interest in the dynamism and density of large cities, particularly Mexico City.

== Personal life ==
Kelly married Ruth Munguía in 1990. The couple had two daughters, born in 1993 and 1997. He lived and worked primarily in Mexico City until his death in 2010.

== Legacy ==
Phil Kelly's paintings are still exhibited regularly and he has work in several notable Mexican museums, including The Museum of Modern Art in Mexico City and The Museum of Modern Art of Oaxaca. Various paintings and drawings have been used as artwork for books published in Mexico, Ireland and in the UK and there are many pieces in private collections. During his life, Kelly forged friendships with many of the art-intellectual elite, including Francisco Goldman. Kelly is depicted as Lowry's Consul in Daniel Lezama's La muerte de Empédocles. Phil Kelly’s enduring connection to Mexico was recognised in 2013 when a painting of El Valle de Chalco was featured as the cover background for the book El Valle de Chalco – Mexico – Ville sortie d’un lac published by L’Harmattan. Kelly's ability to capture Mexico City and the urban environment has drawn parallels between himself and Carlos Fuentes.

== Sources ==
- "Babel Deciphered" Teresa del Conde, La Jornada (Cultural section) January 24, 1997 Mexico DF
- "Babel Deciphered: The plastic idiom of Kelly", Miguel Angel Munoz, Reforma (El Angel Supplement) February 2, 1997
- "A Swirl of Mexico" Aidan Dunne, The Irish Times (The Arts), February 26, 2000.
- "The Seafood Interior by the Irish Painter Phil Kelly", Rick Stein, The Times, London, England, April 24, 2002
- Obituary: The Irish Times August 7 www.irishtimes.com
- Obituary: The Times September 4, 2010 www.thetimes.co.uk
- Obituary - Other Lives: The Guardian 6 October 2010 www.guardian.co.uk/artanddesign/2010/oct/06/phil-kelly-obituary
- Phil Kelly - Dos Horas y Veinticinco Anos. Grupo Fogra 2005 ISBN 970 - 9834 - 00 - 2
