= Boundary Park =

Football stadium

- Ice Station Zebra
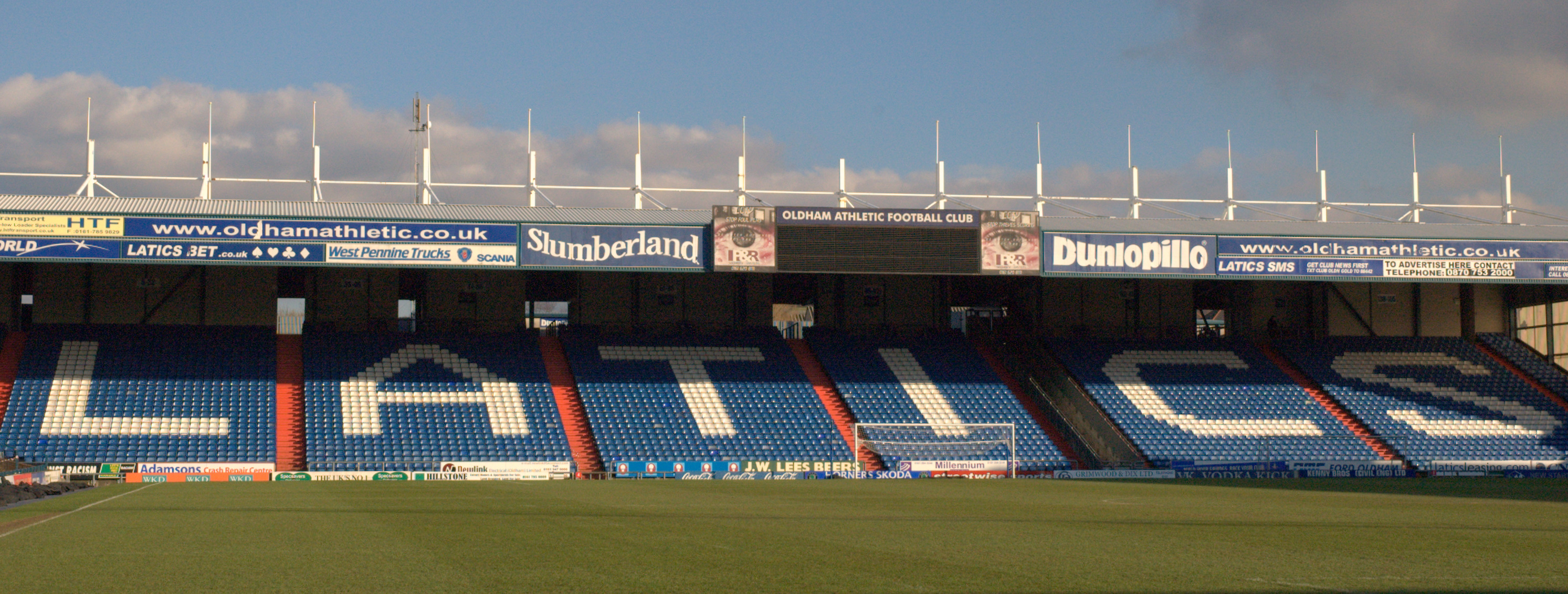
- The Jimmy Frizzell (Rochdale Road) Stand
- Interactive map of Boundary Park
- Full name: Boundary Park
- Location: Boundary Park; Oldham; OL1 2PA
- Coordinates: 53°33′19″N 2°7′43″W
- Elevation: 526 feet (160 m)
- Capacity: 13,186
- Field size: 110 yd × 74 yd (101 m × 68 m)

Construction
- Built: 1904
- Opened: 1 August 1904
- Renovated: 1991–1994, 2014

Tenants
- Oldham Athletic A.F.C. (1906–present); Oldham R.L.F.C. (1997–2001, 2003–2009, 2024–); Manchester Allstars (American Football) (1984-1990)

Boundary Park is a football stadium in Oldham, Greater Manchester, England. Its name originates from the fact that it lies at the northwestern extremity of Oldham, with Royton and Chadderton lying immediately north and west respectively.

Boundary Park was originally known as the Athletic Ground when it was opened in 1896 for Oldham's first professional football club, Oldham County. County folded in 1897, and in 1899 Pine Villa F.C. took over the ground and changed their name to Oldham Athletic. Oldham Athletic A.F.C. have played their home games here since the stadium was opened. For a brief period in the 1980s the stadium hosted Manchester Allstarts American Football home games in the British American Football League. Oldham RLFC also began playing their home matches at the ground after leaving their traditional home, Watersheddings, in 1997, and moved to Boundary Park. However, following disagreements between the boards, they moved away from the ground between 2009 and 2023.

== Overview ==
The Lookers Stand on the Broadway side was knocked down as part of a proposed redevelopment (see below). Oldham Borough Council confirmed planning approval for the new North Stand in April 2013. This will have capacity for 2,671 spectators, plus a health and fitness suite, supporters' bar and event facilities.

The hardcore Oldham fans used to be situated in the Chadderton Road End (Chaddy End); a traditional, small, one-tiered stand. However, the 'Athleticos' now occupy the larger Rochdale Road End, and the away fans are allocated the Chaddy End. The main stand has existed since the time when the stadium was originally built, and is a small two-tiered structure. Terracing disused since the conversion to an all-seater can still be seen towards the end of this stand.

== Capacity ==
The stadium currently has an all-seated capacity of 13,186. It became an all-seater venue during the 1994–95 season – the season after Oldham Athletic's relegation from the top flight of English football. In the early days, the stadium could hold nearly 50,000 people. The highest crowd ever recorded at Boundary Park is 47,671, for an FA Cup tie between Oldham and Sheffield Wednesday in 1930. The highest attendance for a league match was also recorded during the same season against Blackpool, with 45,304 attending for the promotion clash.

== Ownership ==
Historically, Boundary Park was owned by the football club which has occupied it since 1904, Oldham Athletic. This arrangement changed in 1999 when the then owners of the football club sold the stadium to Oldham Property Partnerships, Oldham Council’s joint venture company.

The football club entered administration in 2003 and a takeover by Simon Blitz, Simon Corney and Danny Gazel was completed in early 2005. Blitz and Gazel purchased the football club through their company Oldham Athletic (2004) Association Football Club Limited and subsequently completed the purchase of Boundary Park through a separate company, Brass Bank Limited, with that purchase completing in June 2005.

The ownership of the football club and its stadium was again split in 2011 when Blitz and Gazel sold their shares in Oldham Athletic to Corney, whilst retaining ownership of Boundary Park through Brass Bank Limited.

Corney’s sale of Oldham Athletic to Moroccan football agent Abdallah Lemsagam in 2018 led to a period of dispute between Lemsagam and Blitz over the use of Boundary Park by the football club.

Finally, Lemsagam sold the football club to local businessman Frank Rothwell in July 2022, at which time Rothwell announced that he was also in advanced discussions to purchase Boundary Park from Blitz, a transaction which completed on 24 March 2023, bringing the football club and its stadium back under single ownership for the first time in over ten years.

== Records ==
Boundary Park is anecdotally known as being the coldest ground in the Football League, earning the nickname coined by Joe Royle, Ice Station Zebra. It is also the second-highest stadium, at 526 feet (160 m) above sea level, of any Premier League or Football League club after the Hawthorns, home of West Bromwich Albion, 552 feet (168 m).

== Redevelopment ==
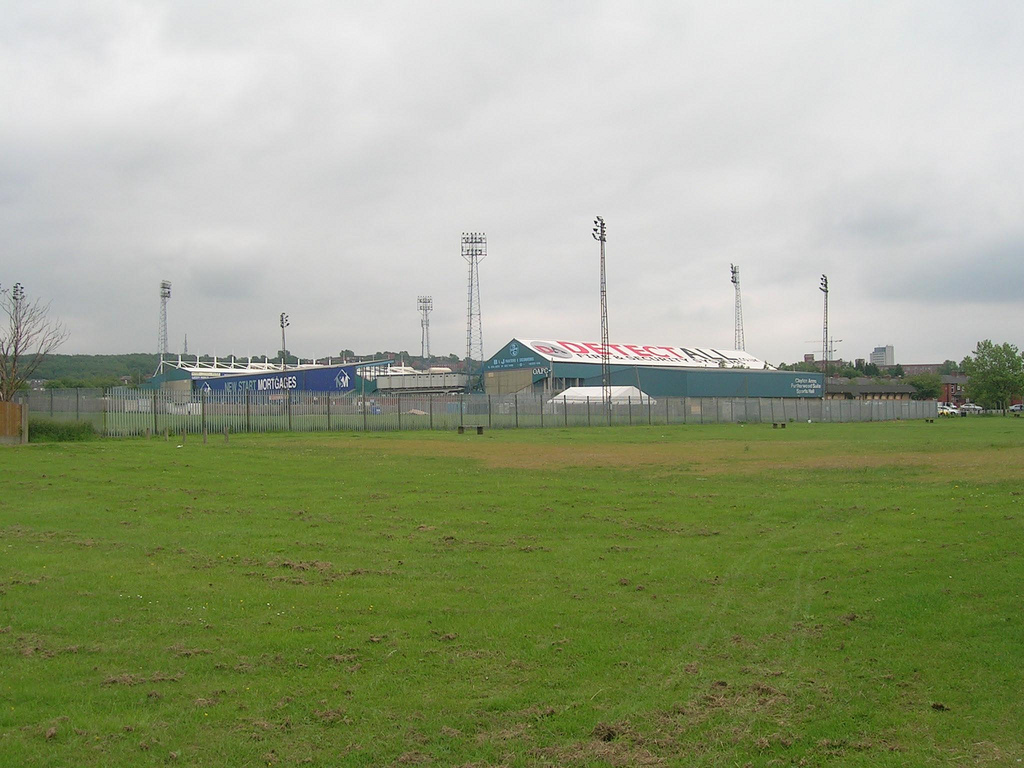
Outside of the Boundary Park ground

There were plans in the late 1990s for a move to a new 20,000 seater stadium (named Sports Park 2000) on adjoining waste ground, but these plans were scrapped. On 15 February 2006, the club unveiled plans for the redevelopment of their current ground. The plans would see every stand other than the Rochdale Road End being redeveloped. When completed it would initially be a 16,000 seater stadium, estimated to cost £80 million, and with a working name of the Oldham Arena.

On 14 November 2007, Oldham Athletic received planning permission for the Broadway Stand, whilst Oldham Borough Council rejected the further development of the stadium due to local objections regarding the height and size of a proposed block of flats. On 12 December 2007, after amending the plans, another council meeting gave permission for redevelopment. Facilities would include conferencing and a hotel plus the option of a casino.

Demolition of the Broadway Stand started on 8 May 2008, with the work completed before the start of the new season. The building of the new stand was due to commence in December 2008 and was expected to take 16 months.

On 28 July 2011 the council offered the club £5.7 million to help with their redevelopment fund of Boundary Park, which would involve the redevelopment of the Broadway Stand.

Following the club's relegation to non-league football with the match against Salford City abandoned, Oldham Athletic decided that the now renamed 'Joe Royle Stand' would be closed for the 2022-23 season, on cost and safety grounds.

In March 2023, it was announced that Oldham Council would invest £1 million in a new pitch at Boundary Park making the surface suitable for increased usage including the return of Oldham R.L.F.C. to the stadium from the 2024 season.
