= Joseph Pearson (footballer) =

English footballer

Joe Pearson
Personal information
- Full name: Joseph Pearson
- Date of birth: 1868
- Place of birth: Lancashire
- Position: Half-back

Senior career*
Years	Team	Apps	(Gls)
1888–1889	Bolton Wanderers	1	(0)
1892	Liverpool	1	(0)
- * Club domestic league appearances and goals

Joseph Pearson (born 1868) was an English footballer who played as a midfielder. Pearson did not make his league debut until his second season (1889–90) at Bolton Wanderers. However, he was selected to play left-half in their 3 FA Cup ties in the 1888–1889 season. In the first 2 ties against Hurst and West Manchester, Pearson was part of a midfield that helped to achieve 2 clean-sheets, but Bolton were unable to score as both games ended 0–0. However, on 17 November 1888. Pearson and his team were well beaten by Irish club, Linfield Athletic, with the final score being 4–0 to Linfield. He played one league match for Liverpool on 3 September 1892 against Higher Walton in the 1892–93 season.
