= John Miller (footballer, born 1870) =

Scottish footballer (1870–1933)

Personal information
- Full name: John Miller
- Date of birth: c. 1870
- Place of birth: Dumbarton, Scotland
- Date of death: 1933 (aged 62–63)
- Place of death: Glasgow, Scotland
- Height: 1.78 m (5 ft 10 in)
- Position: Centre forward

Senior career*
Years	Team	Apps	(Gls)
1890–1891	Union Dumbarton		
1891–1892	Dumbarton	21	(16)
1892–1893	Liverpool	21	(22)
1893–1894	The Wednesday	13	(7)
1894	Airdrieonians		
1894–1895	Clyde	17	(12)
1895–1897	Derby County	62	(20)
1897–1898	Bolton Wanderers	8	(0)

International career
1892	Scottish League XI	1	(2)
- * Club domestic league appearances and goals

John Miller (c. 1870 in Dumbarton – 1933 in Glasgow) was a Scottish footballer who played in the Football League for Bolton Wanderers, Derby County and The Wednesday.

== Career ==
Miller began his career with his local club Union Dumbarton, before being signed by Dumbarton in 1891. He made his debut and scored on 2 May 1891 against St Mirren, which was the final league game of the season. He then played two weeks later and scored in the League Play-Off against Rangers. In the 1891–92 season, Miller made 20 league appearances and scored 15 goals as the Sons won the title outright, having shared the championship the previous year. At its end, he played for the Scottish League XI against the rival Scottish Football Alliance, scoring twice.

In June 1892, Miller joined Liverpool in their first season. He made his debut and scored the sixth goal in Liverpool's first ever match, which was a 7–1 win friendly against Rotherham Town on 1 September. Miller was his league debut on 24 September against Bury, in which he also scored. He went on to make a further 20 league appearances and score a further 21 goals, including 5 against Fleetwood Rangers on 3 December, helping Liverpool to win the Lancashire League. He also made 3 appearances in the FA Cup in which he scored a hat-trick against Nantwich on 15 October. Miller played all of Liverpool's matches in the Lancashire Senior Cup and Liverpool Senior Cup (4 and 3 appearances, respectively) and scored a total of 3 goals.

At the end of the season, Miller wanted a pay rise of "£100 down and £3 per week" which was rejected by Liverpool, so after his contract expired in June 1893, he signed for The Wednesday, playing in the First Division. He played in the first match of the season, but was injured and on 8 December, he was granted a leave of absence to his home in Dumbarton due "ill-health and the injury". He returned a month later and in the season he made a total of 13 appearances, scoring 7 goals.

He returned to Scotland to join Airdrieonians, before joining Clyde on 28 June 1894, playing in Scottish Division One. He made 17 appearances and scored 12 times that season, finishing as the league's top goalscorer. On 13 June 1895, Miller joined Derby County. Over his 2 seasons at the club, he made 62 league appearances, scoring 20 goals. He also made 9 appearances in the FA Cup and scored 5 goals. In October 1897, Miller transferred to Bolton Wanderers for a fee of £100. He made 8 league appearances and 1 appearance in the FA Cup, but didn't score.

== Honours ==
Dumbarton

- Scottish Football League: Champions 1890–91; 1891–92
- Dumbartonshire Cup: Winners 1891–92
- League Charity Cup: Winners 1890–91

Liverpool

- Lancashire League: Winners 1892–93
- Liverpool Senior Cup: Winners 1892–93

== Career statistics ==
Appearances and goals by club, season and competition
Club	Season	League			Cup (Note: Includes Scottish Cup and FA Cup)		Other (Note: Includes Lancashire Senior Cup and Liverpool Senior Cup)		Total	
Club	Season	Division	Apps	Goals	Apps	Goals	Apps	Goals	Apps	Goals
Dumbarton	1890–91	Scottish Football League	1	1	0	0	1 (Note: Includes League Play-Off)	1	2	2
Dumbarton	1891–92	Scottish Football League	20	15	4	3	0	0	24	18
Liverpool	1892–93	Lancashire League	21	22	3	3	7	3	31	28
The Wednesday	1893–94	First Division	13	7	?	?	0	0	13	7
Clyde	1894–95	Scottish Football League	17	12	2	3	0	0	19	15
Derby County	1895–96	First Division	30	12	5	5	0	0	35	17
Derby County	1896–97	First Division	28	7	4	0	0	0	32	7
Derby County	1897–98	First Division	4	1	0	0	0	0	4	1
Bolton Wanderers	1897–98	First Division	8	0	?	?	0	0	8	0
Career total			142	77	18	14	8	4	168	95
