= Hugh McQueen =

Scottish footballer (1867–1944)

Personal information
- Date of birth: 1 October 1867
- Place of birth: Harthill, Scotland
- Date of death: 8 April 1944 (aged 76)
- Position: Outside left

Senior career*
Years	Team	Apps	(Gls)
–	West Benhar		
–	Bo'ness		
1889–1892	Leith Athletic	28	(4)
1892–1895	Liverpool	39	(13)
1895–1901	Derby County	150	(18)
1901–1902	Queens Park Rangers	26	(9)
1902–1903	Gainsborough Trinity	30	(3)
1903–1904	Fulham	10	(3)
1904	Kilmarnock	7	(0)
1905	Hibernian	1	(0)
1908–1909	Norwich City	1	(0)
- * Club domestic league appearances and goals

Hugh McQueen (1 October 1867 – 8 April 1944) was a Scottish footballer, who played for several clubs in the 1890s and 1900s, mainly as an outside left.

Born in Harthill, Lanarkshire, McQueen played for Leith Athletic before being signed by Liverpool manager John McKenna in October 1892, along with his older brother, Matt. Having the distinction of being one of the first players to represent the Reds, he made his debut in a Lancashire League match against Hyde Park United, which Liverpool won 8–0, he went on to help the Anfield club gain promotion to the Football League Division Two at the first attempt.

He was also chosen to play in Liverpool's first ever League match, a 2–0 away victory this time over Middlesbrough Ironopolis. The wing man missed just one game as Liverpool went the whole season (28 games) unbeaten, they then went on to beat Newton Heath (later to become Manchester United) in the promotion 'test match'. Liverpool's stay in the top flight was brief, being relegated straight back down to the second tier by the end of their first season in Division One.

McQueen moved to Derby County in July 1895 and played for them in the 1898 FA Cup Final during a six-year spell. He also represented Queens Park Rangers, Gainsborough Trinity, Fulham, Norwich City, Hibernian and Kilmarnock during the later part of his career.

== Career details ==
Liverpool

- Lancashire League: 1892–93
- Football League Division Two: 1893–94

Derby County

- FA Cup: runner-up 1898
