= Daniel Lezama =

Mexican artist (born 1968)

Daniel Lezama (born in 1968 in Mexico City) is a contemporary Mexican artist based in Mexico City. He is known for his sometimes disturbing fantastic compositions constituted by highly realistic representations of Mexican people juxtaposed in strange dream-like situations and with strong symbolic meanings connected to Mexican history and traditions.

== Early life ==
Daniel Lezama was born in Mexico City in 1968. His father was a commercial painter and together with his family, he lived in Mexico, Texas and Paris and grew up in close contact with the visual arts. Lezama studied in the Escuela Nacional de Artes Plasticas (Academia de San Carlos) of the Universidad Nacional Autonoma de Mexico where he graduated in 1997.

== Career and style ==
He started his formal artistic career in 1995 and has had a productive career since then. His style has been influenced by multiple artists including Rubens, Goya, Caravaggio, Velazquez, Hopper and Orozco, among others. In his paintings, Lezama uses realistic looking representation to create unreal scenes inspired by delicate historical and contemporary Mexican social and psychological themes from his own very personal point of view. Many of his paintings gather groups of unrelated people in unexpected settings that result in representations that resemble surrealistic art.

While he is fairly successful and has exhibited widely, his work creates conflicting reactions that has made some gallery owners hesitant to display it and collectors to own it. Lezama's compositions often bring together groups of people in strange, surrealistic circumstances. While his images represent everyday characters, in his compositions they are converted into history, myths and legends. Each image in the composition has a singular significance but the composition connects all the characters together.

The peculiar physical characteristics and mindset of people in Mexican society are highlighted in Lezama's compositions. He has defined elements of his style as "figurative" since his representations seem real but they are not, "naturalist" because he creates from the imagination instead of using models and "allegorical" because his work can be subjected to multiple interpretations. Moreover, he points out that he does not paint what he likes but what he must as he tries to paint daily. While in his early career he made use of preliminary sketches before producing the final painting, now he paints directly on large canvases. Besides extensive paintings has also been producing sculptures.

== Recognition and reception ==
Early in his career, he was awarded the acquisition prize during the X Rufino Tamayo Biennale in Mexico in 2001 for his work Niña Muerta (Dead Girl), a decision that was hotly contested and controversial. He has received multiple recognitions and sponsorships since then. While some galleries and collectors have condemned and/or refused his work, others have sought it and acquired it.

== Personal life ==
Lezama currently resides and works in downtown Mexico City. He considers himself a "reflective hedonist". He travels daily from his home in Mexico City to his studio, which is located near El Zocalo in the center of the city, in order to separate his artistic endeavors from his private life.

== Exhibitions ==
Lezama's work has been shown in over 20 solo exhibitions and more than 60 collective exhibitions both in Mexico and abroad. For instance: 2022 Centro Cultural Taller Popular, Oaxaca, Mexico (Solo). 2022 Museo de Arte Moderno, Mexico City, Mexico (Solo). 2020 The Mexican Museum, San Francisco, California (Solo – Online). 2012 Spinnerei, Leipzig, Germany (Collective).

== Collections ==
His works can be found in a number of museum collections and private collector's homes in Mexico and abroad. For instance: Museum, in San Francisco, California.
