= Archie Hughes (footballer, born 1871) =

Scottish footballer

Personal information
- Full name: Archibald Hughes
- Date of birth: 1871
- Place of birth: Arthurlie, Scotland
- Position: Centre half

Senior career*
Years	Team	Apps	(Gls)
1890–1891	Barrhead		
1891–1892	Arthurlie		
1892–1893	Middlesbrough Ironopolis		
1893–1894	Bolton Wanderers	15	(2)
1894–1895	Leicester Fosse	18	(2)
1895–1896	Glossop North End		
1896	Chatham		
Total		33	(4)
- * Club domestic league appearances and goals

Archibald Hughes (1871–unknown) was a Scottish footballer who played in the Football League for Bolton Wanderers and Leicester Fosse.
