= John Cameron (footballer, born 1868) =

Scottish footballer

Personal information
- Full name: John Cameron
- Date of birth: 1868
- Place of birth: Glasgow, Scotland
- Height: 1.79 m (5 ft 10 1/2 in)
- Position: Centre forward

Senior career*
Years	Team	Apps	(Gls)
1890	Renton		
1891–1892	Stoke	9	(4)
1892	Hibernian		
1892–1893	Liverpool	7	(4)
1893	Musselburgh Thistle		
- * Club domestic league appearances and goals

John Cameron (1868 (Note: playupliverpool.com have his birth date as 15 July 1869 in Renton; whereas Matthews' Encyclopaedia of Stoke City and lfchistory.net (the latter in which, he is named as Jonathan) date his birth as 1868 in Glasgow.) – unknown) was a Scottish footballer who played in the Football League for Stoke and also played for Liverpool during their inaugural 1892–93 season.

== Career ==
Cameron played football with Renton before they were expelled from the league in September. He then moved south to Stoke in 1891. He played nine matches for Stoke during the 1891–92 season scoring four goals. He returned to Scotland at the end of the season to play for Hibernian.

However, on 7 May 1892, Cameron was signed by Liverpool for their inaugural season. He made his debut and scored twice on 3 September in an 8–0 win against Higher Walton in the Lancashire League. He went on to make a further 6 appearances in the league, scoring a further 2 goals, helping Liverpool finish top of the league. Cameron also played twice in the FA Cup, including a 9–0 win over Newtown, in which he scored the ninth goal. He also played 5 times for the Liverpool Reserves in the Liverpool and District League, scoring at least twice, as some of the scorers haven't been accounted. Cameron also played in 13 friendlies for Liverpool (including a benefit match for Daniel Kirkwood against Bootle), but did not score any goals. In May, at the end of the season, he moved back to Scotland to play for Musselburgh Thistle.

== Career statistics ==
Appearances and goals by club, season and competition
Club	Season	League			FA Cup		Friendlies		Other (Note: Liverpool & District League)		Total	
Club	Season	Division	Apps	Goals	Apps	Goals	Apps	Goals	Apps	Goals	Apps	Goals
Stoke	1891–92	The Football League	9	4	0	0	?	?	?	?	9	4
Liverpool	1892–93	Lancashire League	7	4	2	1	13	0	5	2	27	5
Career total			16	8	2	1	13	0	5	2	36	9
