= Andrew Kelvin =

Scottish footballer (1869–1911)

Personal information
- Full name: Andrew Wallace Kelvin
- Date of birth: 1869
- Place of birth: Kilmarnock, Scotland
- Date of death: 23 October 1911 (aged 41–42)
- Place of death: Kilmarnock, Scotland
- Height: 1.68 m (5 ft 6 in)
- Position: Outside left

Senior career*
| Years | Team | Apps | (Gls) |
| 1890–1892 | Kilmarnock | 6 | (0) |
| 1892–1893 | Liverpool | 4 | (0) |
| 1893–? | Kilmarnock | | |

International career
| 1892 | Scottish Alliance XI | 1 | (2) |
- * Club domestic league appearances and goals

Andrew Wallace Kelvin (born 1869) was a Scottish footballer who played as an outside left. Kelvin played six times for Liverpool during their inaugural season of 1892–93. He also played for Kilmarnock.

== Career ==
Kelvin began his career at Kilmarnock. He made at least two league appearances in the 1890–91 season, scoring three goals. In the Ayrshire Cup final against Hurlford, he scored five goals in a 7–1 win on 21 February 1891. He then made at least four league appearances the following season, at the end of which he was selected for the Scottish Football Alliance XI against the rival Scottish Football League, scoring twice.

In June 1892, Kelvin signed for Liverpool for their inaugural season. He made his debut in the club's first ever match, a friendly against Rotherham Town on 1 September. He then played two days later against Higher Walton, in Liverpool's league debut. He went on to make a further three league appearances and also played twice in the FA Cup. In October 1893, Kelvin moved back to Scotland and re-signed for Kilmarnock. He then played at least one league match in the 1893–94 season for Kilmarnock. He died on 23 October 1911 in Kilmarnock at the age of 52.
