= John Curran (footballer) =

Scottish footballer (1864–1953)

Personal information
- Date of birth: 1 March 1864
- Place of birth: Bellshill, Scotland
- Date of death: 1953 (aged 88–89)
- Place of death: Thorndean Avenue Bellshill
- Position: Defender

Senior career*
Years	Team	Apps	(Gls)
–	Benburb		
1892–1894	Celtic	21	(0)
1894–1895	Liverpool	20	(0)
1895–1896	Hibernian	1	(0)
1896	Motherwell	1	(0)
- * Club domestic league appearances and goals

John Curran (1 March 1864 – January 1933) was a Scottish footballer who played as a full back. He played in the 1894 Scottish Cup Final with Celtic (a defeat by Rangers) and won the Scottish Football League title in the same season (having played a smaller role in their 1892–93 championship win). After Curran moved to England with Liverpool, the team gained promotion as winners of the Second Division in 1894–95, and he was still with the Reds at the start of the following campaign (which ended in relegation) but soon moved on to Hibernian then again to Motherwell.
