= James Kelso (footballer) =

Scottish footballer

Personal information
- Date of birth: 8 January 1869
- Place of birth: Cardross, Scotland
- Date of death: 25 July 1900 (aged 31)
- Place of death: Renton, Scotland
- Position: Right half

Senior career*
Years	Team	Apps	(Gls)
?–1892	Renton		
1892–1893	Liverpool	1	(0)
1893–?	Renton		
- * Club domestic league appearances and goals

James Kelso (8 January 1869 – 25 July 1900) was a Scottish footballer who played as a right half. he was the younger brother of Scotland international player Bob Kelso. He began his career with Renton before joining Liverpool in 1892 for their inaugural season. He made one appearance for Liverpool, in a 4–0 win over Bury in the Lancashire League on 24 September 1892. He rejoined Renton in 1893. Kelso committed suicide at the age of 31.
