= Thomas Wyllie =

Scottish footballer (1870–1943)

Tom Wyllie
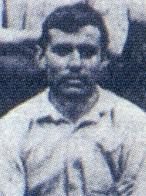

Personal information
- Date of birth: 5 April 1870
- Place of birth: Maybole, South Ayrshire, Scotland
- Date of death: 28 July 1943 (aged 73)
- Place of death: Glasgow
- Position: Outside right

Youth career
- Maybole

Senior career*
Years	Team	Apps	(Gls)
1888–1890	Rangers	4	(0)
1890–1892	Everton	20	(5)
1892–1893	Liverpool		
1893–1897	Bury		
1897–1898	Bristol City	16	(3)

International career
1890	Scotland	1	(1)
- * Club domestic league appearances and goals

Thomas Wyllie (5 April 1870 – 28 July 1943) was a Scottish footballer who played for Rangers, Everton, Liverpool, Bury and Bristol City.

He made four Scottish Football League appearances for Rangers in the competition's first season, 1890–91, then after moving south in December 1890, featured in the same number of fixtures for Everton in the English Football League – both clubs won their respective championships. Although neither the Scottish nor English League issued medals, Wylie was honoured with a medal issued by Everton themselves. The English and Scottish Leagues both adopted the concept for future seasons. Moving to Liverpool in 1892, he was one of their earliest players, prior to their promotion to the Football League. He later won the Second Division title with Bury in 1895 and was in the side which defeated his old club Liverpool in a play-off to gain promotion to the top tier, where he played for two seasons. His spell at Bristol City took place during their time in the Southern League.

Wyllie represented Scotland once in 1890.
