= Sydney Ross (footballer) =

Scottish footballer (1869–1924)

Personal information
- Full name: Sydney Henderson Ross
- Date of birth: 8 June 1869
- Place of birth: Edinburgh, Scotland
- Date of death: 4 February 1924 (aged 54)
- Place of death: South Brisbane, Queensland, Australia
- Height: 1.70 m (5 ft 7 in)
- Position: Goalkeeper

Senior career*
Years	Team	Apps	(Gls)
1889–1890	Clydesdale		
1890–1892	Cambuslang	38	(0)
1892–1893	Liverpool	18	(0)
1893–1894	Cambuslang		
1894–1898	Third Lanark	15	(0)
1898–1899	Clyde		
?–1910	Ayr Parkhouse		

International career
1892	Scottish League XI	1	(0)
- * Club domestic league appearances and goals

Sydney Henderson Ross (8 June 1869 – 4 February 1924) was a Scottish footballer who played as a goalkeeper. He was the first choice goalkeeper for Liverpool during its first season in 1892–93.

== Career ==
Ross was signed by Clydesdale in 1889 and in December was praised for his "phenomenal goalkeeping" in a 5–0 loss to Celtic in the Glasgow Cup. He then moved to Cambuslang, where he stayed until the end of the 1891–92 season, when Cambuslang decided not to apply for re-election to the Scottish Football League.

In June 1892, Ross was one of several players who had taken part in a match between the Scottish League XI and the rival Scottish Football Alliance that were signed up by Liverpool for their inaugural season. He was a regular in the side, making 18 league appearances and three FA Cup appearances. However, on 11 March 1893, Ross suffered a serious injury in a Lancashire Senior Cup match against Bootle, in which he broke his leg. The seriousness of the injury was noted by the fact that he was kept in hospital until 24 March and that it was "feared he [had] received a permanent injury". By the end of the season, he still hadn't recovered from the injury and Liverpool decided to not renew his contract. He returned to Scotland and re-signed for Cambuslang, but his not play his first match until 13 January 1894.

At the beginning of May 1894, Ross transferred to Third Lanark after having been "resting for some time". He made his debut on 5 May in a Glasgow Charity Cup match against Celtic. On 20 November 1895, Ross was badly burned by a gas explosion (the 1901 Census details his occupation as a tinsmith and gas-fitter). Towards the end of May 1898, he signed for Clyde. He also played for Ayr Parkhouse, until he migrated to Australia in June 1910. Ross died from Hodgkins disease and heart failure on 4 February 1924 in South Brisbane at the age of 54.
