= Keith Peters (footballer) =

English footballer

Keith Peters (born 19 July 1915, date of death unknown) was an English footballer who played as a defender, making one appearance for Liverpool in 1939. He was born in Port Sunlight, England in July 1915.
