= Whitefield Park =

Former football ground in Cambuslang, Scotland

- Location in South Lanarkshire
- Location: Cambuslang, Scotland
- Coordinates: 55.8160°N 4.1600°W
- Owner: Cambuslang F.C.
- Surface: Grass

Construction
- Opened: 1888
- Closed: 1897

Tenant
- Cambuslang F.C. (1888–1897)

Whitefield Park was a football ground in Cambuslang, Scotland. It was the home ground of Cambuslang F.C. between 1888 and 1897, including their two seasons in the Scottish Football League.

== History ==
The park was named after 18th century preacher George Whitefield whose Cambuslang Work religious revival events had attracted thousands to the area in 1742. Cambuslang moved to Whitefield Park from Westburn Park in 1888. The ground included an uncovered seated stand on the western side of the pitch and embankment behind the southern end of the pitch; there was also a pavilion in the south-western corner of the site. In 1890 Cambuslang were founder members of the Scottish Football League, and the first league match was played at the ground on 16 August 1890 with Cambuslang beating Vale of Leven 8–2.

The first-ever hat-trick in the SFL was scored at Whitefield Park on 23 August 1890 when John McPherson scored four goals for Rangers on 23 August 1890. Cambuslang dropped out of the league at the end of the 1891–92 season and folded in 1897.

A lawn bowling club, also named Whitefield, nowadays occupies part of the site, with the remainder being housing.

== Whitefield F.C. ground ==
There was also a Whitefield Park in Govan, which was then home ground of the Whitefield F.C. club in the 1880s.
