= 1891–92 Scottish Football League =

Scottish Football League
- Season: 1891–92
- Dates: 15 August 1891 – 24 May 1892
- Champions: Dumbarton; 2nd title
- Relegated: Cambuslang and Vale of Leven (not re-elected)
- Matches: 132
- Goals: 594 (4.5 per match)
- Top goalscorer: Jack Bell (23 goals)
- Biggest home win: Leith Athletic 10–0 Vale of Leven (19 September 1891)
- Biggest away win: Clyde 3–10 Heart of Midlothian (3 October 1891)
- Highest scoring: Clyde 10–3 Vale of Leven (15 August 1891); Clyde 3–10 Heart of Midlothian (3 October 1891)
- Longest winning run: 12 games: Dumbarton
- Longest unbeaten run: 14 games: Celtic
- Longest winless run: 22 games: Vale of Leven
- Longest losing run: 9 games: Vale of Leven

The 1891–92 Scottish Football League was the second season of the Scottish Football League after its formation in 1890. A total of 12 clubs (3rd LRV, Abercorn, Cambuslang, Celtic, Clyde, Dumbarton, Heart of Midlothian, Leith Athletic, Rangers, Renton, St Mirren and Vale of Leven) took part in the competition. Dumbarton and Rangers were the defending champions having shared the title the previous season.

The competition began with the first matches held on 15 August 1891 and concluded on 24 May 1892. The league was won by Dumbarton who won the title outright for the first time on 7 May 1892 after they drew 1–1 away to Abercorn in their final match.

== Clubs ==
Locations of clubs in the 1891–92 Scottish Football League

In the close season after the league's successful first year, the Scottish Football League held its annual general meeting. As per the rules, the bottom three teams from season 1890–91 (St Mirren, Vale of Leven and Cowlairs) were put up for re-election to the league. Clyde and Leith Athletic both applied to join the league while league members agreed to increase the number of teams to 12. St Mirren, Vale of Leven, Clyde and Leith Athletic were all elected to join the league and would compete in the new season beginning on 15 August but Cowlairs failed re-election and instead became founding members of the Scottish Football Alliance. Renton competed for the first few months of the previous season but were expelled by the Scottish Football Association for professionalism however the club successfully appealed its suspension and was readmitted to the league for this season.

Club	Home town/city	Home ground
3rd LRV	Glasgow	Cathkin Park
Abercorn	Paisley	Underwood Park
Cambuslang	Cambuslang	Whitefield Park
Celtic	Glasgow	Celtic Park
Clyde	Glasgow	Barrowfield Park
Dumbarton	Dumbarton	Boghead Park
Heart of Midlothian	Edinburgh	Tynecastle Park
Leith Athletic	Leith	Bank Park
Rangers	Glasgow	Ibrox Park
Renton	Renton	Tontine Park
St Mirren	Paisley	Westmarch
Vale of Leven	Alexandria	Millburn Park

== Season overview ==
The league began on 15 August 1891. Both defending champions Dumbarton and Rangers opened the season with victories against Cambuslang (2–0) and Renton (4–1) respectively. On the same day, Clyde defeated Vale of Leven 10–3 in what would be the joint highest-scoring game of the season.

Rangers suffered an early season set back when they lost the first Old Firm derby of the season to rivals Celtic 3–0 on 22 August and, after a 3–1 defeat to Dumbarton two weeks later, they were effectively out of the running in 10th place with three defeats from their opening four games. Heart of Midlothian defeated Dumbarton 3–1 at Tynecastle Park on 29 August to take the early season lead two points clear at the top.

They would stay there until 19 September when a 5–1 reverse at Boghead Park saw Dumbarton leapfrog them to go top. However, a run of three straight wins – culminating in a 10–3 defeat of Clyde – saw Heart of Midlothian three points clear of Celtic, Dumbarton and Leith Athletic on 3 October.

Dropping points to St Mirren and Vale of Leven allowed the chasing pack to catch up but it was Dumbarton who made the biggest impact. By the time they went top on 7 November after a tight 3–2 win against Renton, they had won five games in a row - a run that would extend well beyond the new year. On Boxing day they again defeated Renton 2–1 to move five points clear of Heart of Midlothian and 10 clear of third-placed Celtic but the Glasgow side had six games in hand, enough to catch and pass the league leaders.

Dumbarton would play just two games in the new year before a crucial tie at home to Celtic on 23 April 1892. The Glasgow side had been unbeaten in all competitions after their opening day loss to Heart of Midlothian racking up 23 wins in 25 games – winning the Glasgow Cup and the Scottish Cup in the process – before a 2–1 loss away to Leith Athletic. That left Dumbarton on 32 points, one clear of Heart of Midlothian with a game in hand and six clear of Celtic who had two games in hand on the league leaders. John Miller scored the only goal in front of 12,000 spectators at Boghead Park to put Dumbarton in pole position to claim the title.

A 6–0 humbling of Rangers 11 days later – in which the league's top scorer Jack Bell scored a hat-trick – put Dumbarton on the brink and, in their final match of the season on 7 May, a 1–1 draw with Abercorn was enough to secure a second league title. On the same day, Vale of Leven drew 1–1 with Renton in their final match as they finished bottom of the table, failing to win a single game throughout the league season.

At the league's annual general meeting on 3 June 1892, it was voted that the number of competing clubs would reduce from 12 to 10 for the next season. The bottom three clubs, St Mirren, Cambuslang and Vale of Leven, had to submit applications to rejoin the league for the next season. The league also received applications from four non-league clubs: Kilmarnock, Cowlairs, Northern and St Bernard's. In the election, St Mirren received the most votes and retained their league status meaning Cambuslang and Vale of Leven lost their league places.

== League table ==
Pos	Team	Pld	W	D	L	GF	GA	GD	Pts	Qualification or relegation
1	Dumbarton (C)	22	18	1	3	79	28	+51	37	Champions
2	Celtic	22	16	3	3	62	21	+41	35	
3	Heart of Midlothian	22	15	4	3	65	35	+30	34	
4	Leith Athletic	22	12	1	9	51	40	+11	25	
5	Rangers	22	11	2	9	59	46	+13	24	
6	Renton	22	8	5	9	38	44	−6	21	
6	3rd LRV	22	8	5	9	44	47	−3	21	
8	Clyde	22	8	4	10	63	62	+1	20	
9	Abercorn	22	6	5	11	45	59	−14	17	
10	St Mirren	22	5	5	12	43	60	−17	15	Re-elected
11	Cambuslang	22	2	6	14	21	53	−32	10	Not re-elected
12	Vale of Leven	22	0	5	17	24	99	−75	5	Not re-elected

Rules for classification: 1) Points;
(C) Champions

== Results ==
Home \ Away	3RD	ABC	CAM	CEL	CLY	DUM	HOM	LEI	RAN	REN	STM	VOL
3rd LRV		1–1	3–1	1–3	3–2	2–5	3–2	0–3	2–2	1–1	2–3	9–2
Abercorn	2–4		3–1	2–5	3–3	1–1	1–3	3–2	0–1	3–3	1–1	6–3
Cambuslang	1–1	0–2		0–4	3–5	0–2	3–3	1–3	0–6	1–1	1–1	1–0
Celtic	5–1	3–1	3–1		0–0	2–0	3–1	2–0	3–0	3–0	2–1	6–1
Clyde	3–3	7–3	2–0	2–7		4–1	3–10	1–2	1–3	1–3	4–1	10–3
Dumbarton	2–0	8–1	5–2	1–0	8–2		5–1	6–0	6–0	2–1	4–2	8–0
Heart of Midlothian	2–0	2–1	1–0	3–1	2–1	3–1		3–1	3–2	4–2	2–2	7–0
Leith Athletic	3–1	3–2	3–0	2–1	1–0	1–3	2–2		3–1	2–3	4–2	10–0
Rangers	2–3	6–2	2–1	1–1	1–5	1–3	0–1	3–2		5–2	2–3	7–0
Renton	1–0	2–1	1–1	0–4	2–1	2–3	0–3	3–0	1–4		5–2	3–0
St Mirren	1–2	2–1	2–2	1–2	1–4	2–3	2–5	3–1	3–4	2–1		6–4
Vale of Leven	0–2	0–3	0–1	2–2	2–2	1–2	2–2	0–3	1–6	1–1	2–2	

Legend: Blue = home team win; Yellow = draw; Red = away team win.

== See also ==
- 1891–92 in Scottish football
