= Phil Kelly (footballer, born 1869) =

English footballer

Philip Kelly (1869 – 1953) was an English footballer who played as a midfielder. He played for Liverpool doing their inaugural 1892–93 season and was the first player born in the city to play for the club. He made three Lancashire League appearances during that season, but was attacked by two members of an opposing team and suffered a leg injury which ended his playing career. However, Kelly remained active in football and was a trainer for several amateur clubs including West Toxteth Labour AFC and Africa Royal FC. He was also a talent spotter into his seventies for South Liverpool FC.
