= 1929–30 Liverpool F.C. season =

English football club season

Liverpool F.C
1929–30 season
- Manager: George Patterson
- Stadium: Anfield
- Football League: 12th
- FA Cup: Third round
- Top goalscorer: League: Jimmy Smith (23); All: Jimmy Smith (23)

The 1929–30 Liverpool F.C. season was the 38th season in existence for Liverpool.

== Squad statistics ==
=== Appearances and goals ===
No.	Pos	Nat	Player	Total		Division 1		FA Cup	
No.	Pos	Nat	Player	Apps	Goals	Apps	Goals	Apps	Goals
	FW	(England) ENG	Harold Barton	11	0	11	0	0	0
	MF	(Scotland) SCO	Tom Bradshaw	17	0	17	0	0	0
	MF	(England) ENG	Tom Bromilow	9	0	9	0	0	0
	FW	(England) ENG	Bob Clark	5	1	5	1	0	0
	DF	(Scotland) SCO	Dave Davidson	23	1	22	1	1	0
	DF	(England) ENG	Bob Done	13	0	13	0	0	0
	MF	(England) ENG	Dick Edmed	30	4	29	4	1	0
	MF	(England) ENG	Tommy Gardner	5	0	5	0	0	0
	FW	(England) ENG	Gordon Gunson	10	1	10	1	0	0
	FW	(South Africa) RSA	Gordon Hodgson	37	14	36	14	1	0
	MF	(England) ENG	Fred Hopkin	32	3	31	3	1	0
	DF	(England) ENG	Jimmy Jackson	41	0	40	0	1	0
	MF	(Scotland) SCO	John Lindsay	4	1	4	1	0	0
	DF	(England) ENG	Tommy Lucas	32	0	31	0	1	0
	MF	(Scotland) SCO	Jimmy McDougall	35	1	34	1	1	0
	FW	(Scotland) SCO	John McFarlane	1	0	1	0	0	0
	MF	(Scotland) SCO	Archie McPherson	26	6	25	5	1	1
	DF	(Scotland) SCO	Tom Morrison	37	0	36	0	1	0
	DF	(Scotland) SCO	Billy Murray	2	1	2	1	0	0
	FW	(England) ENG	Harry Race	19	7	19	7	0	0
	GK	(South Africa) RSA	Arthur Riley	35	0	34	0	1	0
	FW	(England) ENG	Alan Scott	1	0	1	0	0	0
	GK	(Northern Ireland) NIR	Elisha Scott	8	0	8	0	0	0
	FW	(Scotland) SCO	Jimmy Smith	38	23	37	23	1	0
	MF	(South Africa) RSA	Charlie Thompson	1	0	1	0	0	0
	FW	(Scotland) SCO	Dave Wright	1	0	1	0	0	0

== Table ==
Pos	Team	Pld	W	D	L	GF	GA	GAv	Pts
10	Huddersfield Town	42	17	9	16	63	69	0.913	43
11	Birmingham	42	16	9	17	67	62	1.081	41
12	Liverpool	42	16	9	17	63	79	0.797	41
13	Portsmouth	42	15	10	17	66	62	1.065	40
14	Arsenal	42	14	11	17	78	66	1.182	39

Rules for classification: 1) Points; 2) Goal average; 3) Goals scored
