= 1931–32 Liverpool F.C. season =

English football club season

Liverpool F.C
1931–32 season
- Manager: George Patterson
- Stadium: Anfield
- Football League: 10th
- FA Cup: Sixth round
- Top goalscorer: League: Gordon Hodgson (26); All: Gordon Hodgson (27)

The 1931–32 Liverpool F.C. season was the 40th season in existence for Liverpool.

== Squad statistics ==
=== Appearances and goals ===
No.	Pos	Nat	Player	Total		Division 1		FA Cup	
No.	Pos	Nat	Player	Apps	Goals	Apps	Goals	Apps	Goals
	FW	(England) ENG	Harry Barkas	1	0	1	0	0	0
	FW	(England) ENG	Harold Barton	28	12	24	8	4	4
	MF	(Scotland) SCO	Tom Bradshaw	46	0	42	0	4	0
	FW	(England) ENG	Les Bruton	2	0	1	0	1	0
	DF	(England) ENG	John Charlton	3	0	3	0	0	0
	DF	(England) ENG	Bob Done	26	3	26	3	0	0
	FW	(England) ENG	Gordon Gunson	46	19	42	17	4	2
	MF	(England) ENG	Ted Hancock	9	2	9	2	0	0
	DF	(Scotland) SCO	Alastair Henderson	5	0	5	0	0	0
	FW	(South Africa) RSA	Gordon Hodgson	43	27	39	26	4	1
	DF	(England) ENG	Jimmy Jackson	20	0	17	0	3	0
	DF	(England) ENG	Tommy Lucas	17	0	16	0	1	0
	MF	(Scotland) SCO	Jimmy McDougall	43	0	39	0	4	0
	FW	(Scotland) SCO	Archie McPherson	29	2	28	2	1	0
	MF	(England) ENG	Danny McRorie	27	5	25	5	2	0
	DF	(Scotland) SCO	Tom Morrison	39	1	35	1	4	0
	GK	(South Africa) RSA	Arthur Riley	5	0	5	0	0	0
	FW	(England) ENG	Syd Roberts	1	0	1	0	0	0
	DF	(England) ENG	Ted Savage	7	2	7	2	0	0
	GK	(Northern Ireland) NIR	Elisha Scott	41	0	37	0	4	0
	FW	(Scotland) SCO	Jimmy Smith	3	1	3	1	0	0
	DF	(Scotland) SCO	Willie Steel	26	0	22	0	4	0
	FW	(Scotland) SCO	Dave Wright	39	13	35	13	4	0

== Table ==
Pos	Team	Pld	W	D	L	GF	GA	GAv	Pts
8	Portsmouth	42	19	7	16	62	62	1.000	45
9	Birmingham	42	18	8	16	78	67	1.164	44
10	Liverpool	42	19	6	17	81	93	0.871	44
11	Newcastle United	42	18	6	18	80	87	0.920	42
12	Chelsea	42	16	8	18	69	73	0.945	40

Source: World Football
Rules for classification: 1) Points; 2) Goal average; 3) Goals scored
