= 1930–31 Liverpool F.C. season =

English football club season

Liverpool F.C
1930–31 season
- Manager: George Patterson
- Stadium: Anfield
- Football League: 9th
- FA Cup: Third round
- Top goalscorer: League: Gordon Hodgson (36); All: Gordon Hodgson (36)

The 1930–31 Liverpool F.C. season was the 39th season in existence for Liverpool.

== Overview ==
On 27 December 1930 Andrew Aitken made his one and only first team appearance in a 3–3 draw away to Blackburn Rovers. However his career at Liverpool was cut short when on 4 April 1931 he broke his leg in a reserve game against Stockport County.

== Squad statistics ==
=== Appearances and goals ===
No.	Pos	Nat	Player	Total		Division 1		FA Cup	
No.	Pos	Nat	Player	Apps	Goals	Apps	Goals	Apps	Goals
	GK	(England) ENG	Andrew Aitken	1	0	1	0	0	0
	FW	(England) ENG	Harry Barkas	4	0	4	0	0	0
	FW	(England) ENG	Harold Barton	26	4	26	4	0	0
	MF	(Scotland) SCO	Tom Bradshaw	36	0	35	0	1	0
	FW	(England) ENG	Bob Clark	1	1	1	1	0	0
	DF	(England) ENG	Bob Done	14	2	14	2	0	0
	MF	(England) ENG	Dick Edmed	12	4	12	4	0	0
	FW	(England) ENG	Gordon Gunson	9	1	8	1	1	0
	FW	(South Africa) RSA	Gordon Hodgson	41	36	40	36	1	0
	MF	(England) ENG	Fred Hopkin	37	1	36	1	1	0
	DF	(Scotland) SCO	Bob Ireland	1	0	1	0	0	0
	DF	(England) ENG	Jimmy Jackson	29	0	28	0	1	0
	DF	(England) ENG	Norman James	7	0	7	0	0	0
	DF	(England) ENG	Tommy Lucas	43	0	42	0	1	0
	MF	(Scotland) SCO	Jimmy McDougall	40	1	40	1	0	0
	FW	(Scotland) SCO	Archie McPherson	43	10	42	10	1	0
	MF	(England) ENG	Danny McRorie	3	1	3	1	0	0
	DF	(Scotland) SCO	Tom Morrison	40	1	39	1	1	0
	GK	(South Africa) RSA	Arthur Riley	28	0	27	0	1	0
	FW	(England) ENG	Alan Scott	3	2	2	2	1	0
	GK	(Northern Ireland) NIR	Elisha Scott	14	0	14	0	0	0
	FW	(Scotland) SCO	Jimmy Smith	21	14	21	14	0	0
	MF	(South Africa) RSA	Charlie Thompson	5	0	4	0	1	0
	FW	(Scotland) SCO	Dave Wright	15	6	15	6	0	0

== Competitions ==
=== Results ===
27 December 1930	Blackburn Rovers	3–3	Liverpool	Blackburn, Lancashire
				Stadium: Ewood Park

=== Table ===
Pos	Team	Pld	W	D	L	GF	GA	GAv	Pts
7	Middlesbrough	42	19	8	15	98	90	1.089	46
8	Manchester City	42	18	10	14	75	70	1.071	46
9	Liverpool	42	15	12	15	86	85	1.012	42
10	Blackburn Rovers	42	17	8	17	83	84	0.988	42
11	Sunderland	42	16	9	17	89	85	1.047	41

Source: World Football
Rules for classification: 1) Points; 2) Goal average; 3) Goals scored
