= 1932–33 Liverpool F.C. season =

English football club season

Liverpool F.C
1932–33 season
- Manager: George Patterson
- Stadium: Anfield
- Football League: 14th
- FA Cup: Third round
- Top goalscorer: League: Gordon Hodgson (24); All: Gordon Hodgson (24)

The 1932–33 Liverpool F.C. season was the 41st season in existence for Liverpool.

== Squad statistics ==
=== Appearances and goals ===
No.	Pos	Nat	Player	Total		Division 1		FA Cup	
No.	Pos	Nat	Player	Apps	Goals	Apps	Goals	Apps	Goals
	FW	(England) ENG	Harold Barton	35	13	34	13	1	0
	MF	(Scotland) SCO	Tom Bradshaw	40	3	39	3	1	0
	FW	(England) ENG	Les Bruton	6	1	5	1	1	0
	FW	(England) ENG	Ted Crawford	8	4	8	4	0	0
	DF	(England) ENG	Bob Done	30	1	29	1	1	0
	FW	(England) ENG	Gordon Gunson	22	5	21	5	1	0
	MF	(England) ENG	Alf Hanson	11	2	11	2	0	0
	FW	(South Africa) RSA	Gordon Hodgson	39	24	38	24	1	0
	DF	(England) ENG	Jimmy Jackson	14	1	14	1	0	0
	DF	(England) ENG	Norman James	1	0	1	0	0	0
	DF	(England) ENG	Tommy Lucas	3	0	3	0	0	0
	MF	(Scotland) SCO	Jimmy McDougall	27	0	26	0	1	0
	FW	(Scotland) SCO	Archie McPherson	24	1	24	1	0	0
	MF	(England) ENG	Danny McRorie	5	0	5	0	0	0
	DF	(Scotland) SCO	Tom Morrison	33	1	32	1	1	0
	GK	(South Africa) RSA	Arthur Riley	15	0	15	0	0	0
	FW	(England) ENG	Syd Roberts	25	6	25	6	0	0
	DF	(England) ENG	Ted Savage	11	0	11	0	0	0
	GK	(Northern Ireland) NIR	Elisha Scott	28	0	27	0	1	0
	DF	(Scotland) SCO	Willie Steel	43	0	42	0	1	0
	MF	(England) ENG	Harry Taylor	22	2	22	2	0	0
	FW	(Scotland) SCO	Dave Wright	31	14	30	14	1	0

== Table ==
Pos	Team	Pld	W	D	L	GF	GA	GAv	Pts
12	Sunderland	42	15	10	17	63	80	0.788	40
13	Birmingham	42	14	11	17	57	57	1.000	39
14	Liverpool	42	14	11	17	79	84	0.940	39
15	Blackburn Rovers	42	14	10	18	76	102	0.745	38
16	Manchester City	42	16	5	21	68	71	0.958	37

Source: World Football
Rules for classification: 1) Points; 2) Goal average; 3) Goals scored
