= List of Liverpool F.C. players =

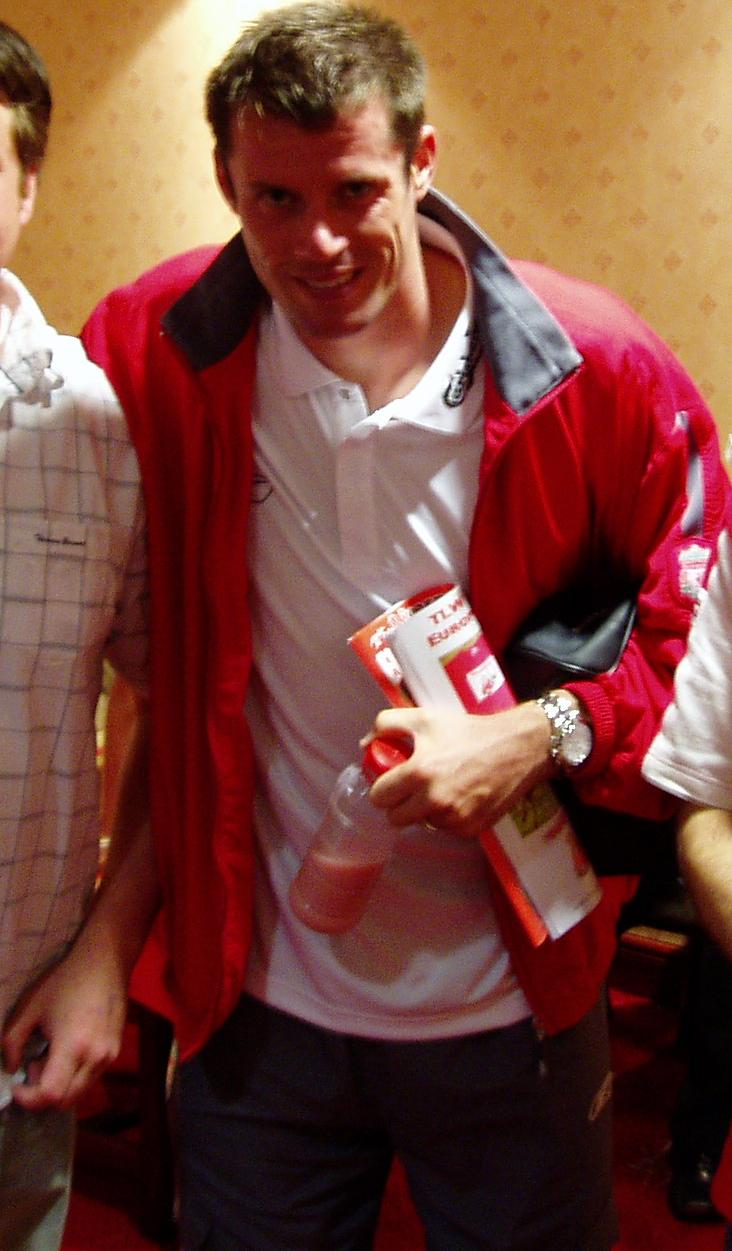
Jamie Carragher has the most appearances in Europe.

Liverpool Football Club is an English professional association football club based in Liverpool, Merseyside, who currently play in the Premier League. They have played at their current home ground, Anfield, since their foundation in 1892. Liverpool entered the Lancashire League in their first season, winning the league. The club applied to the English Football League to become members of the Second Division in the following season, their application was accepted. Since that time, the club's first team has competed in numerous nationally and internationally organised competitions. Since playing their first competitive match, more than 800 players have made a competitive first-team appearance for the club, of whom 224 players have made at least 100 appearances (including substitute appearances); those players are listed here.

Liverpool's record appearance-maker is Ian Callaghan, who made 857 appearances between 1960 and 1978. Jamie Carragher has made the second-most appearances with 737. Eight other players have made more than 600 appearances for the club, every one of them being part of at least one European Cup-winning team. Ian Rush is the club's record goalscorer; he scored 346 goals in his 16 years at Liverpool. Rush is the only player to score more than 300 goals for Liverpool; only four other players have scored more than 200 goals for the club.

== Players ==
- Appearances and goals are for first-team competitive matches only, including Premier League, English Football League, FA Cup, EFL Cup, FA Charity/Community Shield, European Cup/UEFA Champions League, UEFA Cup/UEFA Europa League, UEFA Cup Winners' Cup, Inter-Cities Fairs Cup, UEFA Super Cup and FIFA Club World Cup matches; wartime matches are regarded as unofficial and are excluded, as are matches from the abandoned 1939–40 season.
- Players are listed according to the date of their first team début for the club.
- Positions are listed according to the tactical formations that were employed at the time. Thus, the change in the names of defensive and midfield reflects the tactical evolution that occurred from the 1960s onwards.
- Statistics correct as of 8 November 2026.

Table headers

- Nationality – If a player played international football, the country/countries he played for are shown. Otherwise, the player's nationality is given as their country of birth.
- Liverpool career – The year of the player's first appearance for Liverpool to the year of his last appearance.
- Starts – The number of games started.
- Sub – The number of games played as a substitute. Substitutions were only introduced to the Football League in the 1960s.
- Total – The total number of games played, both as a starter and as a substitute.

Positions key
Pre-1960s		1960s–	
GK	Goalkeeper		
FB	Full back	DF	Defender
HB	Half back	MF	Midfielder
FW	Forward		
U	Utility player		

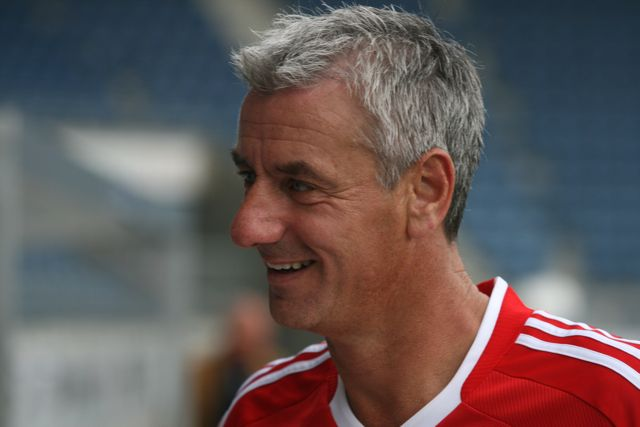
Ian Rush, Liverpool's record goalscorer with 346 goals, held the captaincy from 1993 to 1996.

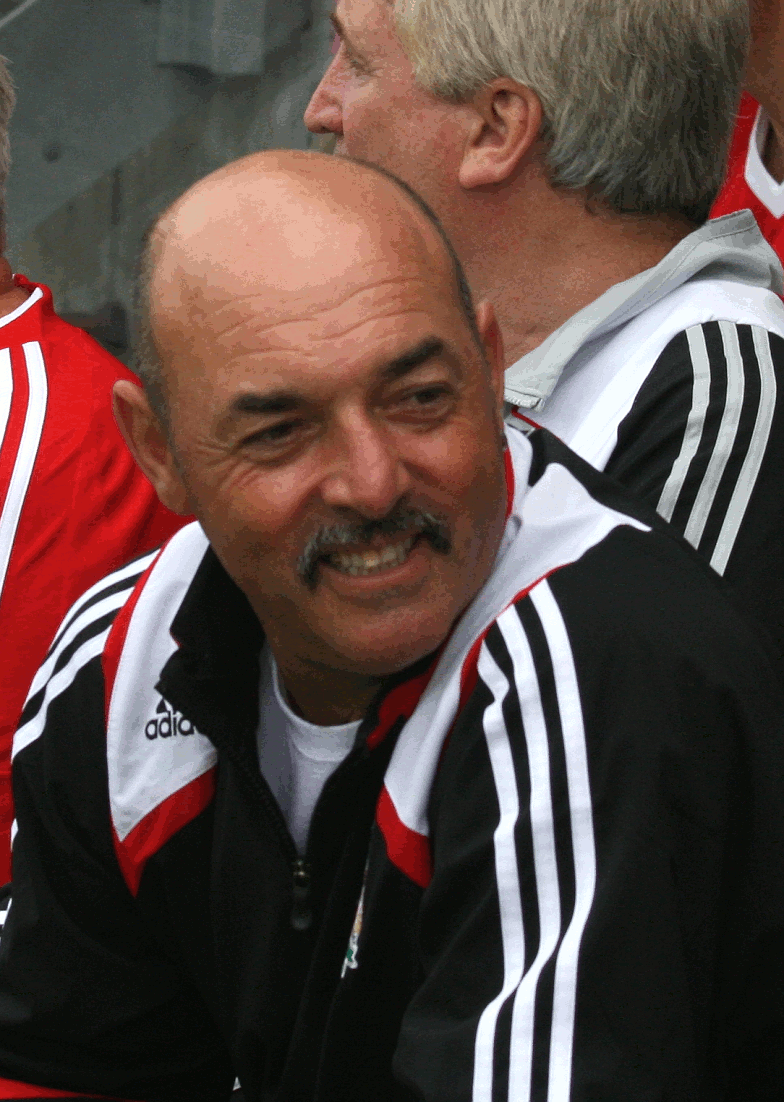
Bruce Grobbelaar has the most appearances for an overseas player.

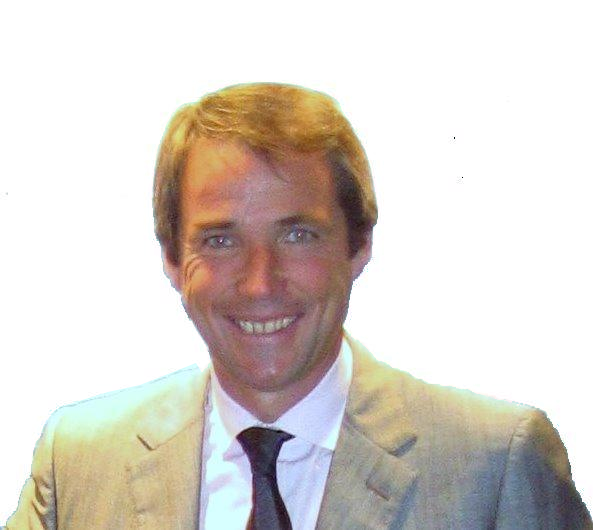
Alan Hansen was captain from 1985 to 1988 and in the 1989–90 season.

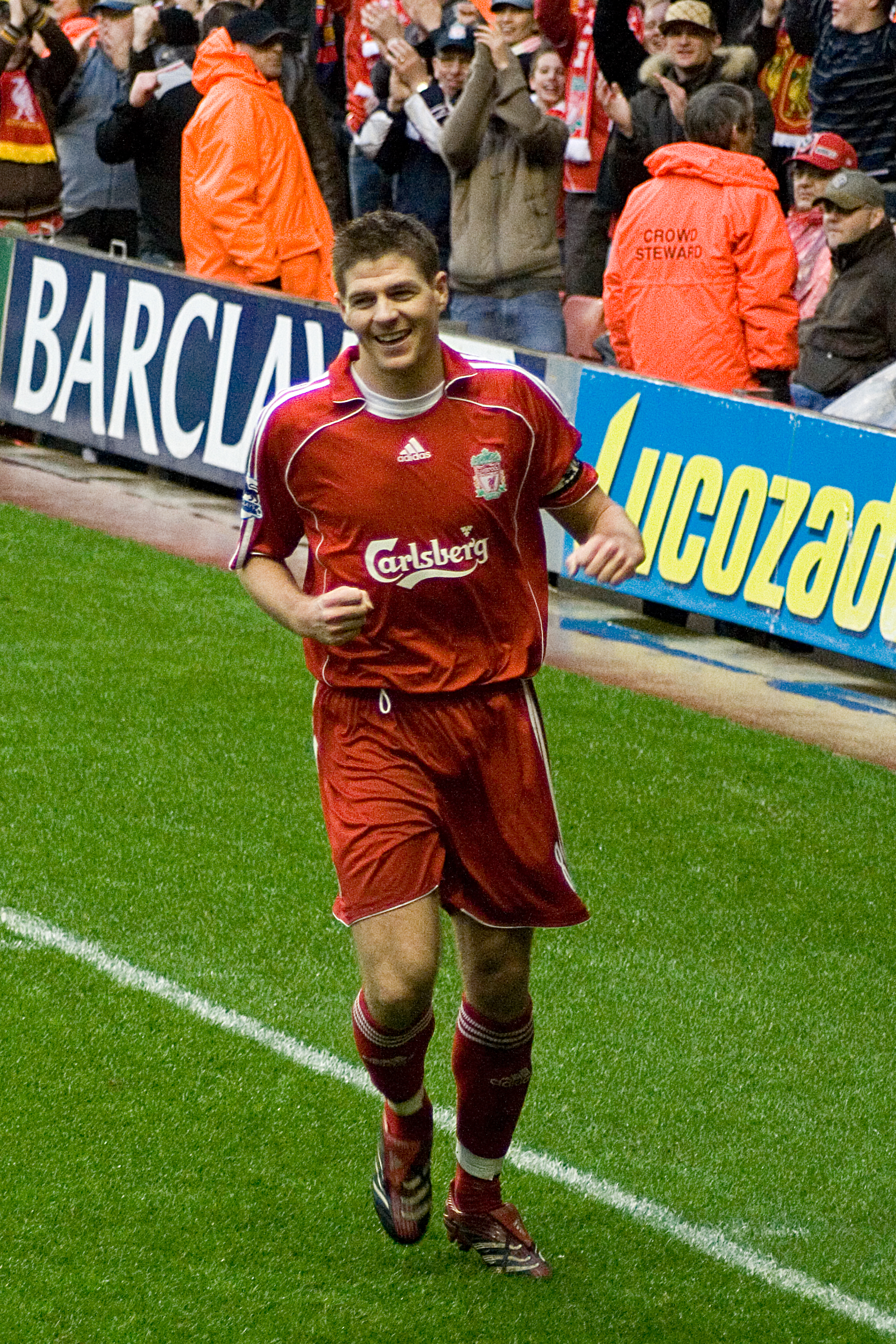
Steven Gerrard was Liverpool's record European goalscorer, and was captain from 2003 to 2015, a record 12 years.

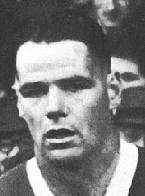
Billy Liddell was Liverpool's oldest-ever goalscorer, and captain from 1955 to 1958.

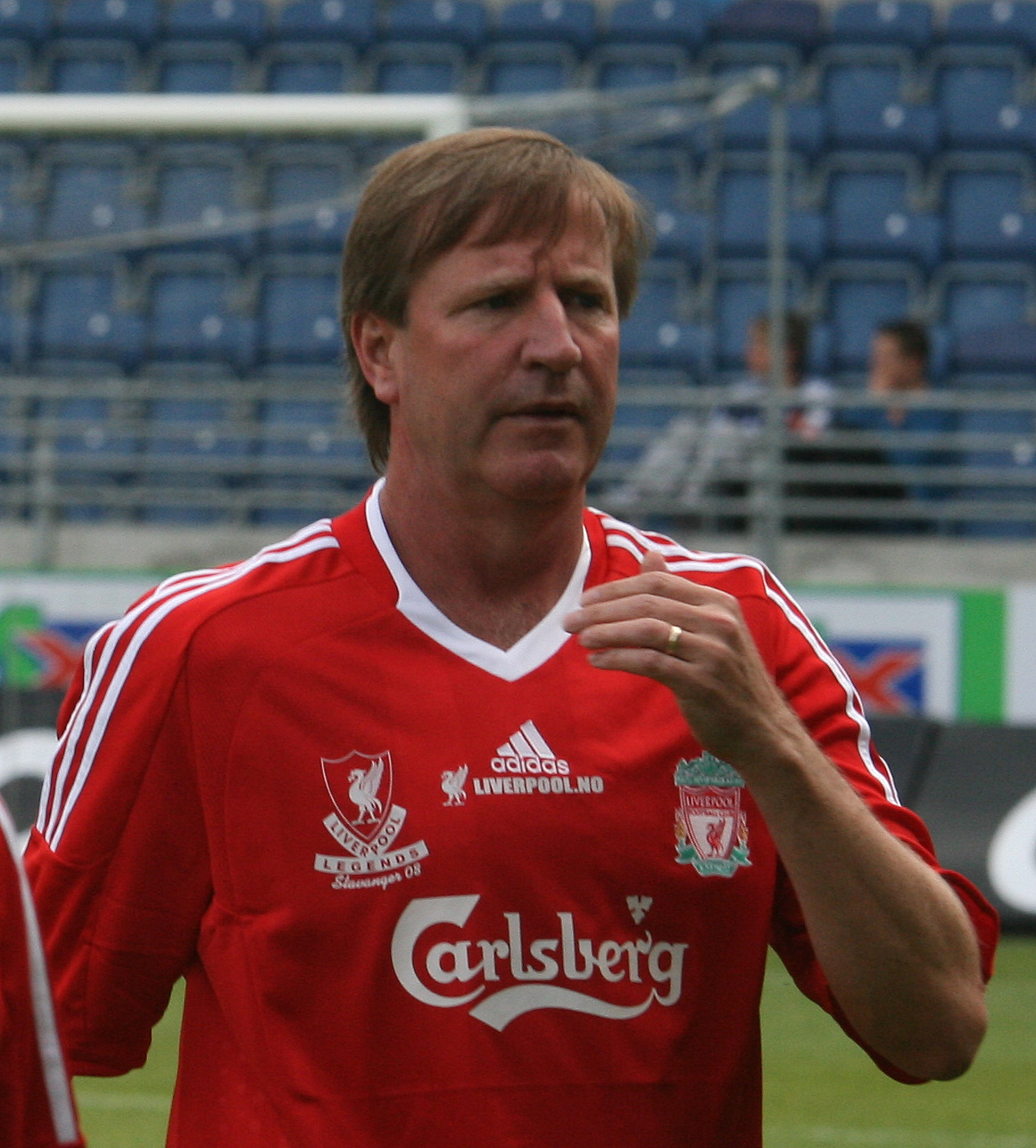
Ronnie Whelan was captain in the 1988–89 season, and shared the captaincy with Steve Nicol in 1990–91.

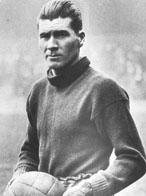
Elisha Scott is the club's longest-serving player.

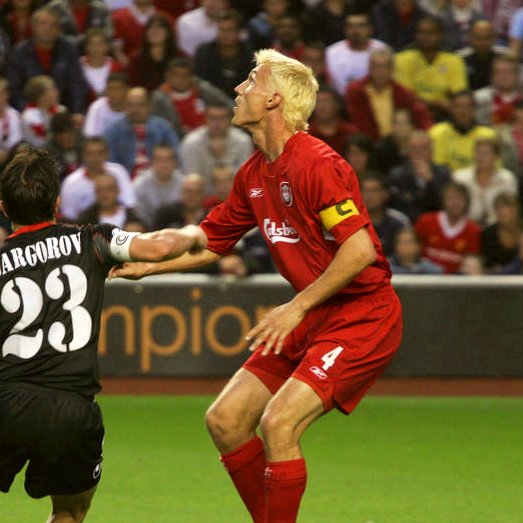
Sami Hyypiä was captain from 2001 to 2003.

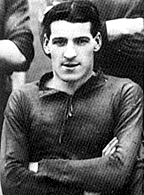
Donald McKinlay captained the side during the 1919–20 season, and again from 1921 to 1928.

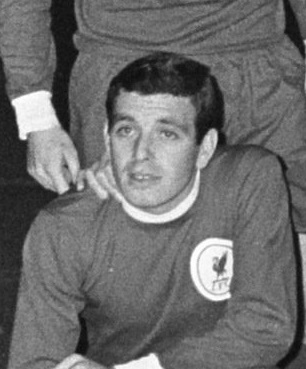
Ian Callaghan is Liverpool's record appearance maker, with 857 between 1960 and 1978.

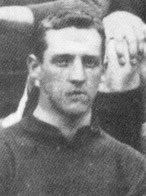
Arthur Goddard was captain from 1909 to 1912.

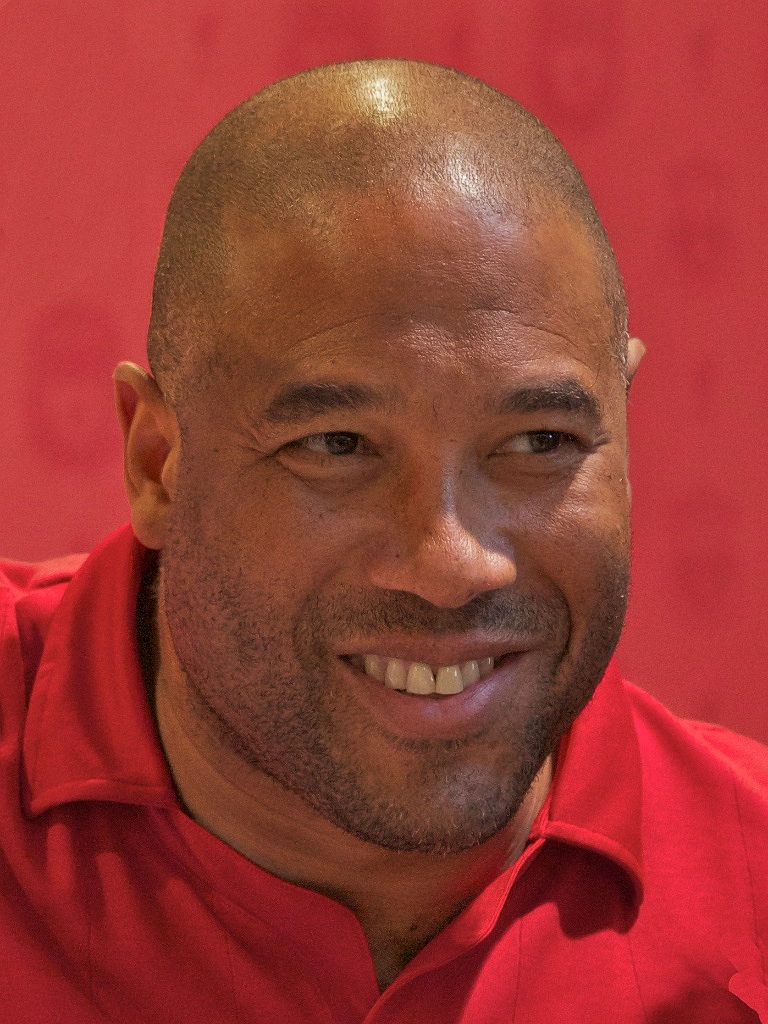
John Barnes was captain for the 1996–97 season.

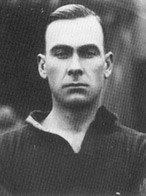
Gordon Hodgson scored more hat-tricks than any other Liverpool player.

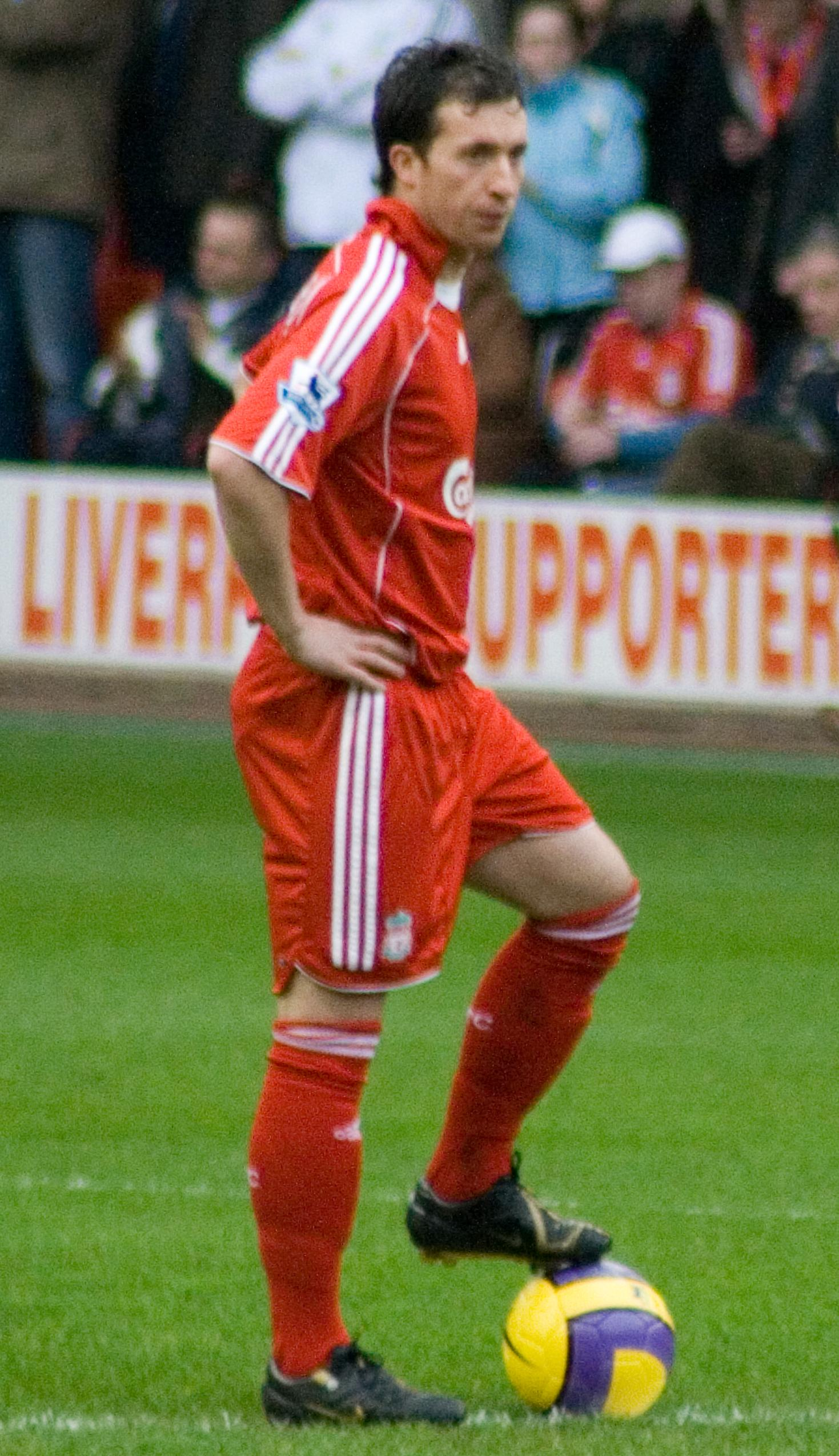
Robbie Fowler was the scorer of the fastest hat-trick in Liverpool history.

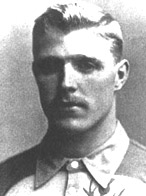
Alex Raisbeck was the captain for Liverpool's first league triumph in 1901, his tenure being from 1899 to 1909.

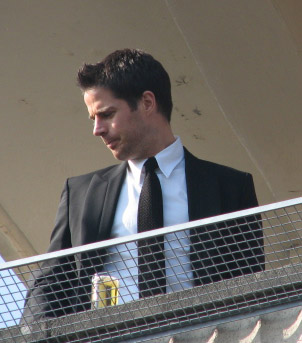
Jamie Redknapp was captain from 1999 to 2001.

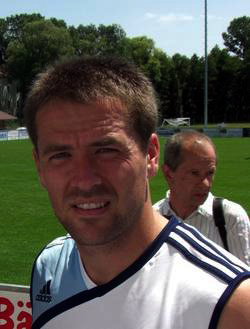
Michael Owen, seen here during his spell with Newcastle United

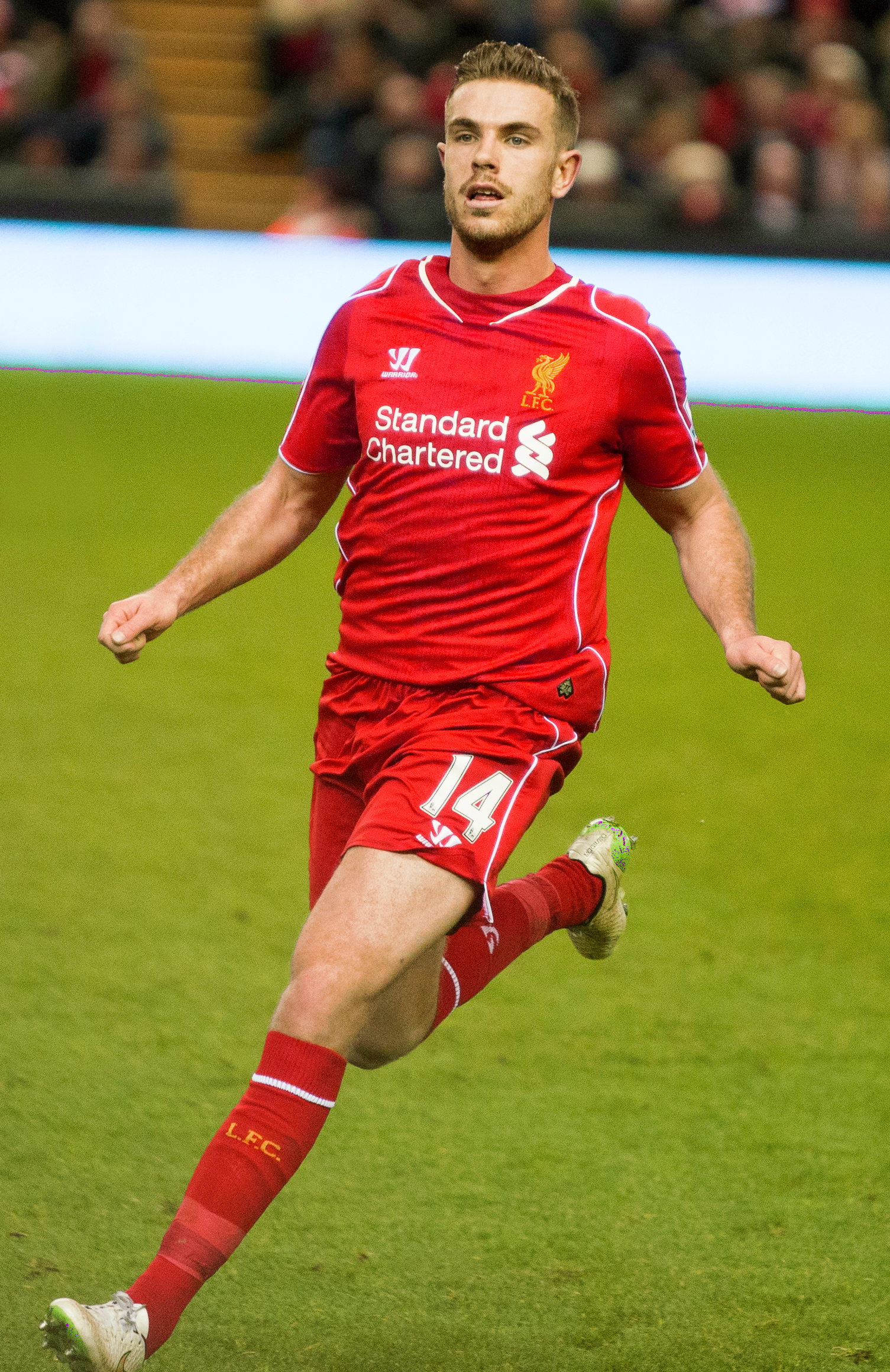
Jordan Henderson was captain from 2015 to 2023.

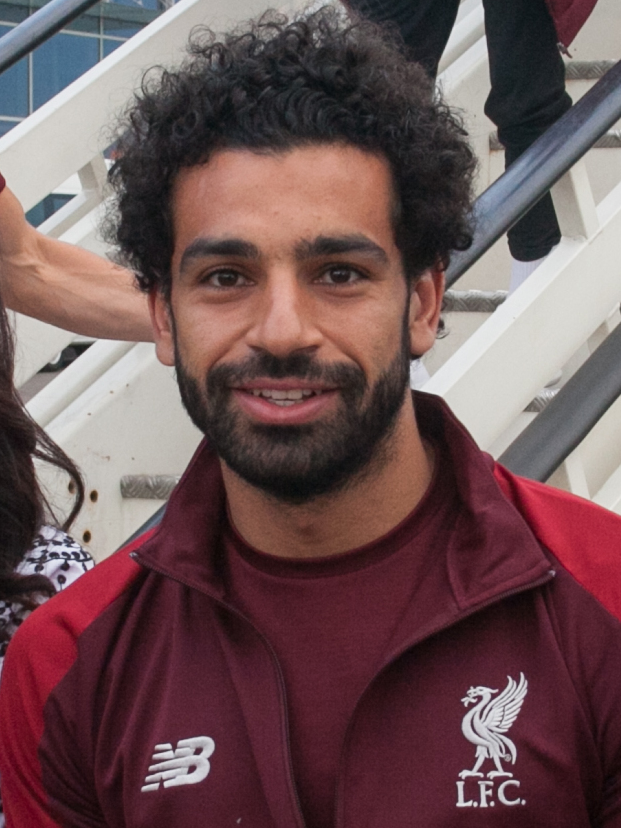
Mohamed Salah scored the most goals for an overseas player.

Liverpool players with over 100 appearances
Player	Nationality	Position	Liverpool career	Starts	Subs	Total	Goals	Ref.
Player	Nationality	Position	Liverpool career	Appearances			Goals	Ref.
Joe McQue	Scotland	FB	1892–1898	142	0	142	14	
John McCartney	Scotland	FB	1892–1898	166	0	166	7	
Matt McQueen	Scotland	U	1892–1897	103	0	103	7	
Malcolm McVean	Scotland	FW	1892–1897	126	0	126	43	
Harry Bradshaw	England	FW	1893–1898	138	0	138	51	
Billy Dunlop	Scotland	FB	1895–1909	363	0	363	3	
Archie Goldie	Scotland	FB	1895–1900	149	0	149	1	
Harry Storer	England	GK	1895–1901; 1898–1899	121	0	121	0	
William Goldie	Scotland	FB	1897–1904	174	0	174	6	
Jack Cox	England	HB	1898–1909	361	0	361	80	
Alex Raisbeck	Scotland	FB	1898–1909	341	0	341	19	
Tom Robertson	Scotland	HB	1898–1902	141	0	141	34	
John Walker	Scotland	FW	1898–1902	120	0	120	31	
Bill Perkins	England	GK	1899–1903	117	0	117	0	
Sam Raybould	England	FW	1900–1907	226	0	226	130	
Maurice Parry	Wales	FB	1900–1909	221	0	221	4	
Arthur Goddard	England	FW	1902–1914	414	0	414	77	
Jack Parkinson	England	FW	1902–1914	219	0	219	128	
Alf West	England	FB	1903–1909; 1910–1911	141	0	141	6	
Robbie Robinson	England	FB	1904–1912	271	0	271	65	
Joe Hewitt	England	FW	1904–1910	164	0	164	73	
Tom Chorlton	England	FB	1904–1912	121	0	121	8	
Sam Hardy	England	GK	1905–1912	240	0	240	0	
James Bradley	England	FB	1905–1911	186	0	186	8	
James Harrop	England	FB	1908–1912	139	0	139	4	
Ronald Orr	Scotland	FW	1908–1912	112	0	112	39	
Robert Crawford	Scotland	FB	1909–1915	115	0	115	1	
Donald Mackinlay	Scotland	FB	1910–1929	434	0	434	34	
Ephraim Longworth	England	FB	1910–1928	370	0	370	0	
Harry Lowe	England	FB	1911–1920	136	0	136	20	
Bob Pursell	Scotland	FB	1911–1920	113	0	113	0	
Elisha Scott	Ireland	GK	1912–1934	468	0	468	0	
Bill Lacey	Ireland/ Republic of Ireland	HB	1912–1915; 1919–1924	260	0	260	29	
Tom Miller	Scotland	FW	1912–1920	146	0	146	56	
Ken Campbell	Scotland	GK	1912–1920	142	0	142	0	
Robert Ferguson	Scotland	FB	1912–1915	103	0	103	2	
Jackie Sheldon	England	HB	1913–1922	147	0	147	20	
Harry Chambers	England	FW	1915–1928	339	0	339	151	
Walter Wadsworth	England	FB	1915–1926	242	0	242	8	
Tommy Lucas	England	FB	1916–1933	366	0	366	3	
Tom Bromilow	England	FB	1919–1929	375	0	375	11	
Dick Forshaw	England	FW	1919–1927	288	0	288	123	
Jock McNab	Scotland	FB	1920–1928	222	0	222	6	
Fred Hopkin	England	HB	1921–1931	360	0	360	12	
Gordon Hodgson	England	FW	1925–1936	377	0	377	241	
Arthur Riley	South Africa	GK	1925–1940	338	0	338	0	
James Jackson	Scotland	FB	1925–1933	224	0	224	2	
Dick Edmed	England	HB	1926–1932	170	0	170	46	
Robert Done	England	FB	1926–1935	155	0	155	13	
Tom Morrison	Scotland	FB	1927–1935	254	0	254	4	
Jimmy McDougall	Scotland	FB	1928–1938	356	0	356	12	
Harold Barton	England	FW	1928–1934	109	0	109	29	
Archie McPherson	Scotland	FW	1929–1934	133	0	133	19	
Tom Bradshaw	Scotland	FB	1930–1938	291	0	291	4	
Dave Wright	Scotland	FW	1930–1934	100	0	100	35	
Alf Hanson	England	HB	1931–1938	177	0	177	52	
Robert Savage	England	FB	1931–1938	105	0	105	2	
Willie Steel	Scotland	FB	1931–1935	128	0	128	0	
Berry Nieuwenhuys	South Africa	HB	1933–1947	257	0	257	79	
Tom Cooper	England	FB	1934–1939	160	0	160	0	
Jim Harley	Scotland	FB	1934–1948	131	0	131	0	
Jack Balmer	England	FW	1935–1952	309	0	309	110	
Willie Fagan	Scotland	FW	1935–1952	182	0	182	57	
Phil Taylor	England	FB	1936–1954	343	0	343	32	
Matt Busby	Scotland	FB	1936–1939	122	0	122	3	
Bill Jones	England	FB	1938–1954	277	0	277	17	
Cyril Done	England	FW	1938–1952	111	0	110	36	
Billy Liddell	Scotland	FW	1939–1961	534	0	534	228	
Ray Lambert	Wales	FB	1939–1956	342	0	342	2	
Bob Paisley	England	FB	1939–1954	277	0	277	13	
Eddie Spicer	England	FB	1939–1954	168	0	168	2	
Laurie Hughes	England	FB	1943–1960	326	0	326	1	
Jimmy Payne	England	HB	1944–1956	243	0	243	43	
Albert Stubbins	England	FW	1946–1953	178	0	178	83	
Cyril Sidlow	Wales	GK	1946–1952	165	0	165	0	
Kevin Baron	England	FW	1946–1954	153	0	153	32	
Brian Jackson	England	HB	1951–1958	133	0	133	11	
Ronnie Moran	England	FB	1952–1965	379	0	379	17	
Alan A'Court	England	HB	1952–1964	381	0	381	63	
Geoff Twentyman	England	FB	1953–1960	184	0	184	19	
Roy Saunders	England	FB	1953–1959	146	0	146	1	
John Evans	England	FW	1953–1957	107	0	107	53	
Louis Bimpson	England	FW	1953–1959	102	0	102	39	
Jimmy Melia	England	HB	1954–1964	286	0	286	79	
Gerry Byrne	England	FB	1955–1969	332	1	333	4	
John Molyneux	England	FB	1955–1962	249	0	249	3	
Dick White	England	FB	1955–1962	217	0	217	1	
Johnny Wheeler	England	HB	1955–1963	177	0	177	23	
Tommy Younger	Scotland	GK	1956–1959	127	0	127	0	
Tommy Lawrence	Scotland	GK	1958–1971	390	0	390	0	
Roger Hunt	England	FW	1958–1969	487	5	492	285	
Jimmy Harrower	Scotland	HB	1958–1961	105	0	105	22	
Tommy Leishman	Scotland	FB	1959–1963	118	0	118	7	
Bert Slater	Scotland	GK	1959–1962	111	0	111	0	
Ian Callaghan	England	MF	1960–1978	850	7	857	68	
Chris Lawler	England	DF	1960–1975	549	0	549	61	
Gordon Milne	England	MF	1960–1967	280	2	282	18	
Ron Yeats	Scotland	DF	1961–1971	453	1	454	16	
Ian St. John	Scotland	FW	1961–1971	420	5	425	118	
Bobby Graham	Scotland	FW	1961–1972	125	12	137	42	
Tommy Smith	England	DF	1962–1978	637	1	638	48	
Willie Stevenson	Scotland	HB	1962–1967	240	1	241	18	
Peter Thompson	England	MF	1963–1974	405	11	416	54	
Geoff Strong	England	DF	1964–1970	195	6	201	33	
Ray Clemence	England	GK	1967–1981	665	0	665	0	
Emlyn Hughes	England	DF	1967–1979	665	0	665	49	
Brian Hall	Scotland	MF	1968–1976	198	26	224	21	
Alun Evans	England	FW	1968–1972	105	6	111	33	
Alec Lindsay	England	DF	1969–1977	246	2	248	18	
Larry Lloyd	England	DF	1969–1974	218	0	218	5	
Phil Boersma	England	FW	1969–1975	99	21	120	30	
Steve Heighway	Republic of Ireland	MF	1970–1981	448	27	475	76	
John Toshack	Wales	FW	1970–1978	237	10	247	96	
Kevin Keegan	England	FW	1971–1977	323	0	323	100	
Phil Thompson	England	DF	1972–1985	470	7	477	13	
Peter Cormack	Scotland	MF	1972–1976	169	9	178	26	
Jimmy Case	England	MF	1973–1981	245	24	269	46	
Terry McDermott	England	MF	1973–1982	317	12	329	81	
Phil Neal	England	DF	1974–1985	648	2	650	59	
Ray Kennedy	England	MF	1974–1982	390	3	393	72	
David Fairclough	England	FW	1974–1983	92	62	154	55	
Joey Jones	Wales	DF	1975–1978	100	0	100	3	
Sammy Lee	England	MF	1976–1986	288	7	295	19	
David Johnson	England	FW	1976–1982	177	36	213	78	
Alan Hansen	Scotland	DF	1977–1991	618	2	620	14	
Kenny Dalglish	Scotland	FW	1977–1990	497	18	515	172	
Graeme Souness	Scotland	MF	1978–1984	357	2	359	55	
Alan Kennedy	England	DF	1978–1985	357	2	359	20	
Ronnie Whelan	Republic of Ireland	MF	1979–1994	475	18	493	73	
Ian Rush	Wales	FW	1980–1987; 1988–1996	630	30	660	346	
Bruce Grobbelaar	Zimbabwe	GK	1981–1994	628	0	628	0	
Steve Nicol	Scotland	DF	1981–1995	451	17	468	46	
Mark Lawrenson	Republic of Ireland	DF	1981–1988	346	10	356	18	
Craig Johnston	England	MF	1981–1988	232	39	271	40	
Gary Gillespie	Scotland	DF	1983–1991	205	9	214	16	
Gary Ablett	England	DF	1983–1992	138	9	147	1	
Jan Mølby	Denmark	MF	1984–1996	260	32	292	61	
Paul Walsh	England	FW	1984–1988	92	20	112	37	
John Wark	Scotland	MF	1984–1988	94	14	108	42	
Steve McMahon	England	MF	1985–1991	275	2	277	50	
Steve Staunton	Republic of Ireland	DF	1986–1991; 1998–2000	126	22	148	7	
Barry Venison	England	DF	1986–1992	139	19	158	3	
John Aldridge	Republic of Ireland	FW	1987–1989	89	15	104	63	
John Barnes	England	MF	1987–1997	403	4	407	108	
Peter Beardsley	England	FW	1987–1991	160	15	175	59	
Mike Marsh	England	DF	1987–1993	70	31	101	6	
Ray Houghton	Republic of Ireland	MF	1987–1992	195	7	202	38	
David Burrows	England	DF	1988–1993	181	12	193	3	
Steve Harkness	England	DF	1989–1999	119	20	139	3	
Steve McManaman	England	MF	1990–1999	348	16	364	66	
Jamie Redknapp	England	MF	1991–2002	270	38	308	41	
Mark Wright	England	DF	1991–1998	206	4	210	9	
Mark Walters	England	MF	1991–1996	82	42	124	19	
Rob Jones	England	DF	1991–1999	241	2	243	0	
Michael Thomas	England	MF	1991–1998	128	35	163	12	
David James	England	GK	1992–1999	276	1	277	0	
Dominic Matteo	Scotland	DF	1992–2000	137	18	155	2	
Stig Inge Bjørnebye	Norway	DF	1992–2000	175	9	184	4	
Robbie Fowler	England	FW	1993–2001; 2006–2007	309	60	369	183	
Neil Ruddock	England	DF	1993–1998	146	6	152	12	
Phil Babb	Republic of Ireland	DF	1994–2000	164	6	170	1	
Jason McAteer	Republic of Ireland	MF	1995–1999	119	20	139	6	
Patrik Berger	Czech Republic	MF	1996–2003	136	60	196	35	
Jamie Carragher	England	DF	1996–2013	702	35	737	5	
Michael Owen	England	FW	1996–2004	267	30	297	158	
Danny Murphy	England	MF	1997–2004	178	71	249	44	
Steven Gerrard	England	MF	1998–2015	647	63	710	186	
Sami Hyypiä	Finland	DF	1999–2009	455	9	464	35	
Dietmar Hamann	Germany	MF	1999–2006	253	30	283	11	
Stéphane Henchoz	Switzerland	DF	1999–2005	201	4	205	0	
Vladimír Šmicer	Czech Republic	MF	1999–2005	110	74	184	19	
Sander Westerveld	Netherlands	GK	1999–2001	103	0	103	0	
Djimi Traoré	Mali	DF	1999–2006	120	21	141	1	
Emile Heskey	England	FW	2000–2004	176	47	223	60	
Igor Bišćan	Croatia	MF	2000–2005	81	37	118	3	
John Arne Riise	Norway	DF	2001–2008	296	52	348	31	
Jerzy Dudek	Poland	GK	2001–2007	184	2	186	0	
Milan Baroš	Czech Republic	FW	2001–2005	66	42	108	27	
Steve Finnan	Republic of Ireland	DF	2003–2008	200	17	217	1	
Harry Kewell	Australia	MF	2003–2008	109	30	139	16	
Xabi Alonso	Spain	MF	2004–2009	181	29	210	19	
Luis García	Spain	FW	2004–2007	85	36	121	30	
Peter Crouch	England	FW	2005–2008	93	41	134	42	
Pepe Reina	Spain	GK	2005–2014	394	0	394	0	
Daniel Agger	Denmark	DF	2006–2014	212	20	232	14	
Fábio Aurélio	Brazil	DF	2006–2012	92	42	134	4	
Dirk Kuyt	Netherlands	FW	2006–2012	237	48	285	71	
Ryan Babel	Netherlands	MF	2007–2011	65	81	146	22	
Yossi Benayoun	Israel	MF	2007–2010	81	53	134	29	
Lucas Leiva	Brazil	MF	2007–2017	266	79	345	7	
Javier Mascherano	Argentina	MF	2007–2010	132	7	139	2	
Fernando Torres	Spain	FW	2007–2011	126	16	142	81	
Martin Škrtel	Slovakia	DF	2008–2016	301	19	320	18	
Glen Johnson	England	DF	2009–2015	191	9	200	9	
Jordan Henderson	England	MF	2011–2023	409	83	492	33	
Luis Suárez	Uruguay	FW	2011–2014	125	8	133	82	
Raheem Sterling	England	MF	2012–2015	98	31	129	23	
Joe Allen	Wales	MF	2012–2016	92	40	132	7	
Daniel Sturridge	England	FW	2013–2019	98	62	160	67	
Philippe Coutinho	Brazil	MF	2013–2017	175	26	201	54	
Simon Mignolet	Belgium	GK	2013–2019	203	1	204	0	
Dejan Lovren	Croatia	DF	2014–2020	168	17	185	8	
Adam Lallana	England	MF	2014–2020	117	61	178	22	
Alberto Moreno	Spain	DF	2014–2019	118	23	141	3	
Emre Can	Germany	MF	2014–2018	145	22	167	14	
Nathaniel Clyne	England	DF	2015–2020	96	7	103	2	
Roberto Firmino	Brazil	FW	2015–2023	283	79	362	111	
Joe Gomez	England	DF	2015–	194	86	280	0	
James Milner	England	MF	2015–2023	202	130	332	26	
Divock Origi	Belgium	FW	2015–2022	68	107	175	41	
Georginio Wijnaldum	Netherlands	MF	2016–2021	206	31	237	22	
Sadio Mané	Senegal	FW	2016–2022	248	21	269	120	
Joël Matip	Cameroon	DF	2016–2023	180	21	201	11	
Trent Alexander-Arnold	England	DF	2016–2025	318	36	354	23	
Mohamed Salah	Egypt	FW	2017–2026	401	41	442	257	
Andy Robertson	Scotland	DF	2017–2026	334	44	378	14	
Alex Oxlade-Chamberlain	England	MF	2017–2023	70	76	146	18	
Virgil van Dijk	Netherlands	DF	2018–	385	4	389	36	
Alisson	Brazil	GK	2018–	347	0	347	1	
Naby Keïta	Guinea	MF	2018–2023	77	52	129	11	
Fabinho	Brazil	MF	2018–2023	181	38	219	11	
Curtis Jones	England	MF	2019–2026	139	89	228	22	
Harvey Elliott	England	MF	2019–	71	78	149	15	
Diogo Jota	Portugal	FW	2020–2025	114	68	182	65	
Kostas Tsimikas	Greece	DF	2020–	77	47	124	0	
Ibrahima Konaté	France	DF	2021–2026	166	17	183	7	
Luis Díaz	Colombia	FW	2022–2025	113	35	148	41	
Darwin Núñez	Uruguay	FW	2022–2025	76	67	143	40	
Cody Gakpo	Netherlands	FW	2023–	137	55	192	53	
Dominik Szoboszlai	Hungary	MF	2023–	132	26	158	31	
Alexis Mac Allister	Argentina	MF	2023–	136	30	166	24	
Ryan Gravenberch	Netherlands	MF	2023–	124	25	149	10	

=== 100 players who shook the Kop ===
A poll of 110,000 Liverpool F.C. fans in 2006 revealed their opinion on the "100 players who shook the Kop", i.e. whose contribution had a big impact on the club. The overall winner was Kenny Dalglish ahead of Steven Gerrard. (Note: not all of these players made over 100 appearances for the club). British newspapers frequently refer to the list placings when discussing the careers of players included.

A second running of the poll in 2013 saw Gerrard replace Dalglish at the top of the list, as well as some new entries (mostly post-2006 players).
