= 1933–34 Liverpool F.C. season =

English football club season

Liverpool F.C
1933–34 season
- Manager: George Patterson
- Stadium: Anfield
- Football League: 18th
- FA Cup: Fifth round
- Top goalscorer: League: Gordon Hodgson (24); All: Gordon Hodgson (25)

The 1933–34 Liverpool F.C. season was the 42nd season in existence for Liverpool.

== Squad statistics ==
=== Appearances and goals ===
No.	Pos	Nat	Player	Total		Division 1		FA Cup	
No.	Pos	Nat	Player	Apps	Goals	Apps	Goals	Apps	Goals
	FW	(England) ENG	Harold Barton	7	0	6	0	1	0
	DF	(England) ENG	Ernie Blenkinsop	9	0	9	0	0	0
	MF	(Scotland) SCO	Tom Bradshaw	43	1	39	0	4	1
	DF	(England) ENG	Tom Bush	2	0	2	0	0	0
	MF	(South Africa) RSA	Lance Carr	2	0	2	0	0	0
	DF	(England) ENG	Ben Dabbs	1	0	1	0	0	0
	DF	(England) ENG	Bob Done	25	2	21	2	4	0
	FW	(Northern Ireland) NIR	Sam English	31	20	28	18	3	2
	MF	(England) ENG	Alf Hanson	39	13	36	12	3	1
	FW	(South Africa) RSA	Gordon Hodgson	40	25	37	24	3	1
	FW	(England) ENG	Tommy Johnson	11	2	11	2	0	0
	MF	(Scotland) SCO	Jimmy McDougall	36	0	32	0	4	0
	FW	(Scotland) SCO	Archie McPherson	9	0	9	0	0	0
	DF	(Scotland) SCO	Tom Morrison	37	1	33	1	4	0
	MF	(South Africa) RSA	Berry Nieuwenhuys	38	10	34	9	4	1
	GK	(South Africa) RSA	Arthur Riley	32	0	32	0	0	0
	FW	(England) ENG	Jack Roberts	1	0	1	0	0	0
	FW	(England) ENG	Syd Roberts	15	4	13	3	2	1
	DF	(England) ENG	Ted Savage	15	0	15	0	0	0
	GK	(Northern Ireland) NIR	Elisha Scott	14	0	10	0	4	0
	DF	(Scotland) SCO	Willie Steel	43	0	40	0	3	0
	MF	(England) ENG	Harry Taylor	21	3	19	3	2	0
	DF	(England) ENG	Jack Tennant	14	0	13	0	1	0
	FW	(Scotland) SCO	Dave Wright	14	2	12	2	2	0
	FW	(England) ENG	Vic Wright	7	2	7	2	0	0

== Table ==
Pos	Team	Pld	W	D	L	GF	GA	GAv	Pts
16	Middlesbrough	42	16	7	19	68	80	0.850	39
17	Leicester City	42	14	11	17	59	74	0.797	39
18	Liverpool	42	14	10	18	79	87	0.908	38
19	Chelsea	42	14	8	20	67	69	0.971	36
20	Birmingham	42	12	12	18	54	56	0.964	36

Source: World Football
Rules for classification: 1) Points; 2) Goal average; 3) Goals scored
