= 1934–35 Liverpool F.C. season =

English football club season

Liverpool F.C
1934–35 season
- Manager: George Patterson
- Stadium: Anfield
- Football League: 7th
- FA Cup: Fourth round
- Top goalscorer: League: Gordon Hodgson (27); All: Gordon Hodgson (29)

The 1934–35 Liverpool F.C. season was the 43rd season in existence for Liverpool.

== Squad statistics ==
=== Appearances and goals ===
No.	Pos	Nat	Player	Total		Division 1		FA Cup	
No.	Pos	Nat	Player	Apps	Goals	Apps	Goals	Apps	Goals
	DF	(England) ENG	Ernie Blenkinsop	16	0	16	0	0	0
	MF	(Scotland) SCO	Tom Bradshaw	33	0	31	0	2	0
	DF	(England) ENG	John Browning	3	0	3	0	0	0
	MF	(South Africa) RSA	Lance Carr	8	2	8	2	0	0
	DF	(England) ENG	Tommy Cooper	25	0	23	0	2	0
	DF	(England) ENG	Ben Dabbs	2	0	2	0	0	0
	DF	(England) ENG	Bob Done	1	0	1	0	0	0
	FW	(Northern Ireland) NIR	Sam English	19	6	19	6	0	0
	MF	(England) ENG	Alf Hanson	37	9	35	9	2	0
	FW	(South Africa) RSA	Gordon Hodgson	36	29	34	27	2	2
	FW	(England) ENG	Fred Howe	6	3	6	3	0	0
	FW	(England) ENG	Tommy Johnson	20	5	20	5	0	0
	GK	(England) ENG	Stan Kane	3	0	3	0	0	0
	DF	(Scotland) SCO	Norman Low	11	0	11	0	0	0
	MF	(Scotland) SCO	Jimmy McDougall	40	1	38	1	2	0
	FW	(Scotland) SCO	Archie McPherson	2	0	2	0	0	0
	DF	(Scotland) SCO	Tom Morrison	8	0	8	0	0	0
	MF	(South Africa) RSA	Berry Nieuwenhuys	31	11	29	10	2	1
	GK	(South Africa) RSA	Arthur Riley	41	0	39	0	2	0
	FW	(England) ENG	Syd Roberts	12	3	10	1	2	2
	DF	(England) ENG	Fred Rogers	5	0	5	0	0	0
	DF	(England) ENG	Ted Savage	29	0	27	0	2	0
	DF	(Scotland) SCO	Willie Steel	16	0	16	0	0	0
	MF	(England) ENG	Harry Taylor	14	1	14	1	0	0
	DF	(England) ENG	Jack Tennant	28	0	26	0	2	0
	FW	(England) ENG	Vic Wright	38	20	36	19	2	1

== Table ==
Pos	Team	Pld	W	D	L	GF	GA	GAv	Pts
5	Grimsby Town	42	17	11	14	78	60	1.300	45
6	Derby County	42	18	9	15	81	66	1.227	45
7	Liverpool	42	19	7	16	85	88	0.966	45
8	Everton	42	16	12	14	89	88	1.011	44
9	West Bromwich Albion	42	17	10	15	83	83	1.000	44

Source: World Football
Rules for classification: 1) Points; 2) Goal average; 3) Goals scored
