= 1928–29 Liverpool F.C. season =

English football club season

Liverpool F.C
1928–29 season
- Manager: George Patterson
- Stadium: Anfield
- Football League: 5th
- FA Cup: Fourth round
- Top goalscorer: League: Gordon Hodgson (30); All: Gordon Hodgson (32)

The 1928–29 Liverpool F.C. season was the 37th season in existence for Liverpool.

== Squad statistics ==
=== Appearances and goals ===
No.	Pos	Nat	Player	Total		Division 1		FA Cup	
No.	Pos	Nat	Player	Apps	Goals	Apps	Goals	Apps	Goals
	MF	(England) ENG	Tom Bromilow	30	1	28	1	2	0
	FW	(England) ENG	Bob Clark	35	9	32	9	3	0
	DF	(Scotland) SCO	Dave Davidson	39	1	36	1	3	0
	DF	(England) ENG	Bob Done	40	5	37	5	3	0
	MF	(England) ENG	Dick Edmed	42	16	39	16	3	0
	DF	(Scotland) SCO	Jimmy Gray	1	0	1	0	0	0
	FW	(South Africa) RSA	Gordon Hodgson	41	32	38	30	3	2
	MF	(England) ENG	Fred Hopkin	22	0	22	0	0	0
	DF	(England) ENG	Jimmy Jackson	45	0	42	0	3	0
	MF	(Scotland) SCO	John Lindsay	12	2	10	1	2	1
	DF	(England) ENG	Tommy Lucas	5	0	5	0	0	0
	DF	(Scotland) SCO	Neil McBain	2	0	2	0	0	0
	MF	(Scotland) SCO	Jimmy McDougall	39	8	36	8	3	0
	FW	(Scotland) SCO	John McFarlane	1	0	1	0	0	0
	DF	(Scotland) SCO	Donald McKinlay	2	0	2	0	0	0
	FW	(Northern Ireland) NIR	Billy Millar	3	2	3	2	0	0
	DF	(Scotland) SCO	Tom Morrison	45	0	42	0	3	0
	FW	(England) ENG	Harry Race	13	9	13	9	0	0
	FW	(Scotland) SCO	Tommy Reid	6	2	5	2	1	0
	GK	(South Africa) RSA	Arthur Riley	23	0	20	0	3	0
	MF	(Scotland) SCO	Bill Salisbury	17	3	16	2	1	1
	GK	(Northern Ireland) NIR	Elisha Scott	22	0	22	0	0	0
	DF	(England) ENG	Bert Shears	2	0	2	0	0	0
	FW	(England) ENG	Bert Whitehurst	8	2	8	2	0	0

== Table ==
Pos	Team	Pld	W	D	L	GF	GA	GAv	Pts
3	Aston Villa	42	23	4	15	98	81	1.210	50
4	Sunderland	42	20	7	15	93	75	1.240	47
5	Liverpool	42	17	12	13	90	64	1.406	46
6	Derby County	42	18	10	14	86	71	1.211	46
7	Blackburn Rovers	42	17	11	14	72	63	1.143	45

Source: World Football
Rules for classification: 1) Points; 2) Goal average; 3) Goals scored
