= 1935–36 Liverpool F.C. season =

English football club season

Liverpool F.C
1935–36 season
- Manager: George Patterson
- Stadium: Anfield
- Football League: 19th
- FA Cup: Fourth round
- Top goalscorer: League: Fred Howe (17); All: Fred Howe (17)

The 1935–36 Liverpool F.C. season was the 44th season in existence for Liverpool.

== Squad statistics ==
=== Appearances and goals ===
No.	Pos	Nat	Player	Total		Division 1		FA Cup	
No.	Pos	Nat	Player	Apps	Goals	Apps	Goals	Apps	Goals
	FW	(England) ENG	Jack Balmer	17	3	17	3	0	0
	DF	(England) ENG	Ernie Blenkinsop	37	0	37	0	0	0
	MF	(Scotland) SCO	Tom Bradshaw	43	0	41	0	2	0
	DF	(England) ENG	John Browning	6	0	6	0	0	0
	MF	(Scotland) SCO	Matt Busby	11	1	11	1	0	0
	MF	(South Africa) RSA	Lance Carr	23	6	21	6	2	0
	FW	(England) ENG	Jimmy Collins	6	0	6	0	0	0
	DF	(England) ENG	Tommy Cooper	28	0	26	0	2	0
	DF	(England) ENG	Ben Dabbs	15	0	13	0	2	0
	FW	(England) ENG	Bob Glassey	8	4	8	4	0	0
	MF	(England) ENG	Alf Hanson	5	0	5	0	0	0
	DF	(Scotland) SCO	Jim Harley	8	0	8	0	0	0
	FW	(England) ENG	Billy Hartill	5	0	5	0	0	0
	FW	(South Africa) RSA	Gordon Hodgson	17	9	17	9	0	0
	FW	(England) ENG	Fred Howe	36	17	34	17	2	0
	FW	(England) ENG	Tommy Johnson	8	1	6	1	2	0
	GK	(England) ENG	Stan Kane	3	0	3	0	0	0
	DF	(Scotland) SCO	Norman Low	1	0	1	0	0	0
	MF	(Scotland) SCO	Jimmy McDougall	40	1	38	1	2	0
	MF	(South Africa) RSA	Berry Nieuwenhuys	41	10	39	10	2	0
	GK	(South Africa) RSA	Arthur Riley	41	0	39	0	2	0
	FW	(England) ENG	Syd Roberts	6	0	6	0	0	0
	DF	(England) ENG	Fred Rogers	2	0	2	0	0	0
	DF	(England) ENG	Ted Savage	29	0	27	0	2	0
	DF	(England) ENG	Jack Shield	1	0	1	0	0	0
	MF	(England) ENG	Harry Taylor	13	0	13	0	0	0
	DF	(England) ENG	Phil Taylor	7	2	7	2	0	0
	FW	(England) ENG	Vic Wright	27	7	25	6	2	1

== Table ==
Pos	Team	Pld	W	D	L	GF	GA	GAv	Pts	Relegation
17	Grimsby Town	42	17	5	20	65	73	0.890	39	
18	West Bromwich Albion	42	16	6	20	89	88	1.011	38	
19	Liverpool	42	13	12	17	60	64	0.938	38	
20	Sheffield Wednesday	42	13	12	17	63	77	0.818	38	
21	Aston Villa (R)	42	13	9	20	81	110	0.736	35	Relegation to the Second Division

Source: World Football
Rules for classification: 1) Points; 2) Goal average; 3) Goals scored
(R) Relegated
