= 1927–28 Liverpool F.C. season =

English football club season

Liverpool F.C
1927–28 season
- Manager: Matt McQueen; George Patterson
- Stadium: Anfield
- Football League: 16th
- FA Cup: Fourth round
- Top goalscorer: League: Gordon Hodgson (23); All: Gordon Hodgson (23)

The 1927–28 Liverpool F.C. season was the 36th season in existence for Liverpool.

== Squad statistics ==
=== Appearances and goals ===
No.	Pos	Nat	Player	Total		Division 1		FA Cup	
No.	Pos	Nat	Player	Apps	Goals	Apps	Goals	Apps	Goals
	MF	(England) ENG	Tom Bromilow	44	3	42	3	2	0
	FW	(England) ENG	Harry Chambers	26	4	24	3	2	1
	FW	(England) ENG	Bob Clark	2	0	2	0	0	0
	FW	(Scotland) SCO	Willie Devlin	18	14	18	14	0	0
	DF	(England) ENG	Bob Done	4	0	4	0	0	0
	MF	(England) ENG	Dick Edmed	44	15	42	14	2	1
	FW	(South Africa) RSA	Gordon Hodgson	32	23	32	23	0	0
	MF	(England) ENG	Fred Hopkin	38	3	36	3	2	0
	DF	(England) ENG	Jimmy Jackson	42	1	40	1	2	0
	DF	(England) ENG	Ephraim Longworth	1	0	1	0	0	0
	DF	(England) ENG	Tommy Lucas	30	0	28	0	2	0
	DF	(Scotland) SCO	Neil McBain	10	0	10	0	0	0
	DF	(Scotland) SCO	Donald McKinlay	42	0	40	0	2	0
	MF	(Northern Ireland) NIR	Dave McMullan	20	0	19	0	1	0
	MF	(Scotland) SCO	Jock McNab	8	1	7	1	1	0
	DF	(Scotland) SCO	Tom Morrison	15	0	15	0	0	0
	DF	(Scotland) SCO	Billy Murray	2	0	2	0	0	0
	MF	(England) ENG	George Pither	6	1	6	1	0	0
	FW	(England) ENG	Harry Race	11	2	11	2	0	0
	FW	(Scotland) SCO	Tommy Reid	27	15	25	15	2	0
	GK	(South Africa) RSA	Arthur Riley	27	0	25	0	2	0
	GK	(Northern Ireland) NIR	Elisha Scott	17	0	17	0	0	0
	FW	(England) ENG	Tom Scott	3	1	3	1	0	0
	DF	(England) ENG	Bert Shears	4	0	4	0	0	0
	FW	(England) ENG	Jimmy Walsh	11	2	9	2	2	0

== Table ==
Pos	Team	Pld	W	D	L	GF	GA	GAv	Pts
14	The Wednesday	42	13	13	16	81	78	1.038	39
15	Sunderland	42	15	9	18	74	76	0.974	39
16	Liverpool	42	13	13	16	84	87	0.966	39
17	West Ham United	42	14	11	17	81	88	0.920	39
18	Manchester United	42	16	7	19	72	80	0.900	39

Source: World Football
Rules for classification: 1) Points; 2) Goal average; 3) Goals scored
