= 1936–37 Liverpool F.C. season =

English football club season

Liverpool FC
1936–37 season
- Manager: George Kay
- Stadium: Anfield
- First Division: 18th
- FA Cup: Third round
- Top goalscorer: League: Fred Howe (16); All: Fred Howe (16)
Home colours	Away colours

The 1936–37 season was Liverpool's 45th season in existence, and the club finished in 18th place. The club also reached the third round of the FA Cup and were knocked out by Norwich City.

== Squad statistics ==
=== Appearances and goals ===
No.	Pos	Nat	Player	Total		Division 1		FA Cup	
No.	Pos	Nat	Player	Apps	Goals	Apps	Goals	Apps	Goals
	FW	(England) ENG	Jack Balmer	34	8	33	8	1	0
	DF	(England) ENG	Ernie Blenkinsop	7	0	7	0	0	0
	MF	(Scotland) SCO	Tom Bradshaw	31	0	31	0	0	0
	DF	(England) ENG	John Browning	3	0	3	0	0	0
	MF	(Scotland) SCO	Matt Busby	30	1	29	1	1	0
	DF	(England) ENG	Tom Bush	9	0	9	0	0	0
	FW	(England) ENG	Jimmy Collins	1	0	1	0	0	0
	DF	(England) ENG	Tommy Cooper	40	0	39	0	1	0
	DF	(England) ENG	Ben Dabbs	32	0	32	0	0	0
	FW	(England) ENG	Harry Eastham	23	2	22	2	1	0
	FW	(England) ENG	Bob Glassey	1	0	1	0	0	0
	MF	(England) ENG	Alf Hanson	43	13	42	13	1	0
	DF	(Scotland) SCO	Jim Harley	5	0	4	0	1	0
	GK	(England) ENG	Alf Hobson	26	0	25	0	1	0
	FW	(England) ENG	Fred Howe	41	16	40	16	1	0
	GK	(South Africa) RSA	Dirk Kemp	7	0	7	0	0	0
	DF	(Scotland) SCO	Norman Low	1	0	1	0	0	0
	MF	(Scotland) SCO	Jimmy McDougall	40	0	39	0	1	0
	MF	(South Africa) RSA	Berry Nieuwenhuys	41	13	40	13	1	0
	GK	(South Africa) RSA	Arthur Riley	10	0	10	0	0	0
	FW	(England) ENG	Syd Roberts	2	0	2	0	0	0
	DF	(England) ENG	Fred Rogers	9	0	9	0	0	0
	DF	(England) ENG	Ted Savage	9	0	8	0	1	0
	MF	(England) ENG	Harry Taylor	1	0	1	0	0	0
	DF	(England) ENG	Phil Taylor	14	3	14	3	0	0
	FW	(England) ENG	Vic Wright	13	4	13	4	0	0

== Table ==
Pos	Team	Pld	W	D	L	GF	GA	GAv	Pts
16	West Bromwich Albion	42	16	6	20	77	98	0.786	38
17	Everton	42	14	9	19	81	78	1.038	37
18	Liverpool	42	12	11	19	62	84	0.738	35
19	Leeds United	42	15	4	23	60	80	0.750	34
20	Bolton Wanderers	42	10	14	18	43	66	0.652	34

Source: World Football
Rules for classification: 1) Points; 2) Goal average; 3) Goals scored
