= Archie McPherson =

Archie McPherson may refer to:

- Archie Macpherson (born 1937), Scottish football commentator
- Archie McPherson (footballer) (1910–1969), Scottish footballer
