= Edmed =

Edmed is a surname. Notable people with the surname include:

- Dick Edmed (1904–1984), English footballer
- Steve Edmed (born 1968), Australian rugby league player
- Tane Edmed (born 2000), Australian rugby union player
