= Jack Bruton =

English footballer and manager

Personal information
- Full name: John Bruton
- Date of birth: 21 November 1903
- Place of birth: Westhoughton, England
- Date of death: 13 March 1986 (aged 82)
- Height: 5 ft 8 in (1.73 m)
- Position: Winger

Youth career
- Hindley Green

Senior career*
Years	Team	Apps	(Gls)
1922–1923	Wigan Borough	0	(0)
1923–1924	Bolton Wanderers	0	(0)
1924–1925	Horwich RMI		
1925–1929	Burnley	167	(42)
1929–1939	Blackburn Rovers	324	(108)
1939	Preston North End	0	(0)

International career
1928–1929	England	3	(0)

Managerial career
- 1947–1949: Blackburn Rovers
- 1950–1956: Bournemouth & Boscombe Athletic
- * Club domestic league appearances and goals

John Bruton (21 November 1903 – 13 March 1986) was a professional footballer and manager who spent the major part of his career in both capacities with Blackburn Rovers.

== Playing career ==
Born in Westhoughton, near Bolton, he initially played as an amateur in the outside-right position with Wigan Borough, Bolton Wanderers and Horwich RMI while working in the coal mines before signing for Burnley as a professional in 1925. It was reported that he came up from the pit and signed professional forms on an overturned tub at the pit head. At Turf Moor he established himself as one of the best wingers in the country and won representative honours with the Football League team. He also made three appearances for England.

He scored 44 times in 176 games for Burnley before becoming Blackburn Rovers' record £6,500 signing in December 1929. A maker of goals as well as a scorer, Bruton proved to be remarkably consistent during his playing career with the Rovers. In the 1930–31 season, Bruton was the Rovers' top-scorer with 19 league goals, closely followed by his unrelated namesake Les Bruton on 18.

He scored 115 times in 344 appearances for Blackburn before moving on to Preston North End in 1939, although he was prevented from making any first team appearances for Preston as a result of the outbreak of World War II.

He was awarded a benefit match in 1935 when Blackburn Rovers beat Celtic 1–0 on Monday, 22 April at Ewood Park.

== Management career ==
After the war he returned to Ewood Park as assistant trainer and assistant secretary. During manager Will Scott's absence through illness, Bruton took over the running of the club and on Scott's return was appointed assistant manager. He was the natural successor when Rovers' lack of consistency led to Scott finally vacating the manager's chair in December 1947. On taking control Bruton's immediate aim was to avoid the team's relegation from Division 1, but nine defeats in the last ten games sealed the club's fate.

In an attempt to regain First Division status, Bruton signed Dennis Westcott, a proven goal-scorer from Wolves, and also unearthed an exciting prospect at left-back in the shape of Bill Eckersley. However, success proved just as elusive and after the club finished in fourteenth place in the Second Division, Bruton was summoned to a board meeting and dismissed in May 1949.

In 1950 he was appointed manager at Bournemouth & Boscombe Athletic, who played in the Third Division South. He remained at Dean Court for six years until 1956.

After retiring as a manager he continued as a scout for both Blackburn Rovers and Bournemouth and also for Portsmouth.
