= John Shield =

English footballer

Personal information
- Date of birth: April 10, 1915
- Place of birth: South Shields, England
- Date of death: 24 October 1981 (aged 66)
- Position: Defender

Senior career*
Years	Team	Apps	(Gls)
1936–1937	Liverpool	1	(0)
- * Club domestic league appearances and goals

John George Shield (10 April 1915 – 24 October 1981) was an English footballer who played as a defender.

Shield was born in South Shields and graduated with a Bachelor of Science degree from Durham University in 1936. A leading amateur player, he was part of the Bishop Auckland side that won the 1935 FA Amateur Cup, and was said to be similar in style to Tom Bromilow. He worked as a teacher outside of football.

He played a single game for Liverpool F.C. in the 1936–37 season when he deputised for Jimmy McDougall in defence.
