= Tom Cooper (footballer) =

English footballer (1905–1940)

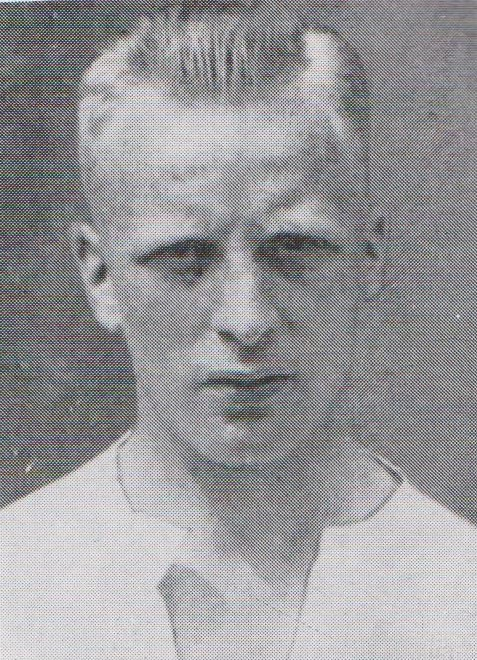
- Cooper in the 1920s

Personal information
- Full name: Thomas Cooper
- Date of birth: 9 April 1905
- Place of birth: Fenton, Staffordshire, England
- Date of death: 25 June 1940 (aged 35)
- Place of death: Aldeburgh, England
- Height: 5 ft 9 in (1.75 m)
- Position: Right-back

Youth career
- Longton
- Trentham

Senior career*
Years	Team	Apps	(Gls)
1924–1926	Port Vale	32	(0)
1926–1934	Derby County	248	(1)
1934–1940	Liverpool	150	(0)
Total		430	(1)

International career
1927–1934	England	15	(0)
	Football League	5	(0)
- * Club domestic league appearances and goals

Thomas Cooper (9 April 1905 – 25 June 1940) was an England international footballer who played for Port Vale, Derby County, and Liverpool. He won 15 caps and played 430 league games in a 16-year career in the Football League. He helped Derby to finish second in the Second Division in 1925–26 and second in the First Division in 1929–30.

== Early and personal life ==
Thomas Cooper was born on 9 April 1905 in Fenton, Staffordshire. He was the seventh of eight children to Stephen James and Sarah Ann (née Shorthouse); his father worked as a bricklayer. He worked as a haulage hand at the coal mine. He married Beatrice Jean Raynor in June 1931; they had two children. An accomplished golfer, he won the Merseyside Professional Golf Championship three years running.

== Playing career ==
=== Port Vale ===
Cooper played for Longton and Cheshire County League side Trentham before being bought by Port Vale for a fee of £20 in August 1924. He made his first-team debut on 13 December 1924, in an FA Cup qualification win at Alfreton that finished with an 8–2 margin of victory. He made his league debut at the Old Recreation Ground a week later in a 2–1 victory over Manchester United. He played 21 Second Division matches in the 1924–25 season, but featured just 11 times in the 1925–26 campaign.

=== Derby County ===
Cooper was sold to George Jobey's Derby County for a £2,500 fee in March 1926, having impressed in a Boxing Day fixture against the "Rams" the previous year. He settled straight into the first XI and became an integral member of the team that secured promotion out of the Second Division with a second-place finish in 1925–26. County went on to finish 12th in the First Division in 1926–27, before rising to fourth place in 1927–28, though Cooper missed much of the latter campaign after undergoing a cartilage operation. After a sixth-place finish in 1928–29, County finished second in the league in 1929–30 – though they ended up some ten points behind champions The Wednesday. In December 1930, Newcastle United had a bid for Cooper rejected. Derby secured a sixth-place finish again in 1930–31. Cooper was made captain at the Baseball Ground in 1931, and led the club to 15th in 1931–32, seventh in 1932–33, and fourth again in 1933–34. Stoke City attempted to sign Cooper in November 1934, offering Frank Soo in part-exchange, but Derby turned them down.

=== Liverpool ===
After 267 appearances for Derby, Liverpool manager George Patterson secured his services for a £7,500 fee in December 1934. He immediately made his debut on 8 December in an away fixture at Stamford Bridge; Chelsea spoilt the day for Cooper by humbling the "Reds" 4–1. Cooper failed to hit the target for his new club (after only scoring once for Derby) although he was an excellent defender who was one of the toughest tacklers in the game. He wasn't just a stopper; his passing was of the highest order. His Anfield career was pretty much the same as his Derby days, as he became a regular starter from day one; he missed just two of the remaining fixtures of the 1934–35 season and featured in 127 of the 168 games over the following four campaigns. Liverpool finished just two places and three points above the relegation zone in 1935–36, and rose just one place in 1936–37. The club then posted 11th-place finishes in 1937–38 and 1938–39.

His last competitive game was a league game at Anfield; Chelsea were the visitors, and the "Reds" won 1–0 with a goal from débutante Cyril Done. The league was then called to a halt because of the war, with regional leagues being set up around the country. Cooper's last match in a red shirt was at Gresty Road on 22 March 1940 in a 6–3 victory over Crewe Alexandra in the Western Division. Cooper also played as a wartime guest for Wrexham.

== International career ==
The Football Association saw his quality at Derby and selected him to represent England 15 times. His first cap came on 22 October 1927 in a British Home Championship match at Windsor Park Belfast; Ireland were the hosts and won the game 2–0. He played in the 1929 defeat to Spain, which was England's first defeat overseas. Cooper was given the ultimate honour of captaining his country twice in his last two appearances for England; the first time was against Czechoslovakia on 16 May 1934; the Czechs won the game 2–1. He would surely have been selected to play even more representative matches had it not been for injuries, including having both knee cartilages removed.

== Death ==
Cooper enlisted in the armed forces in World War II, joining the Royal Military Police. In June 1940, Cooper was out on his despatch motorcycle when he collided with a lorry; he died in the accident. An inquiry took place into his death, with the outcome being an order that stated despatch riders were no longer allowed to ride their motorcycles without wearing a crash helmet. At his funeral at Littleover, Derbyshire, his six pallbearers were Sammy Crooks, Harry Bedford, George Collin, Douglas Duncan, Tom Davison and George Stevenson, all former Derby County clubmates. He was subsequently buried at Nottingham Road Cemetery, Derby.

== Career statistics ==
Appearances and goals by club, season and competition
Club	Season	League			FA Cup		Total	
Club	Season	Division	Apps	Goals	Apps	Goals	Apps	Goals
Port Vale	1924–25	Second Division	21	0	1	0	22	0
Port Vale	1925–26	Second Division	11	0	0	0	11	0
Port Vale	Total		32	0	1	0	33	0
Derby County	1925–26	Second Division	5	0	0	0	5	0
Derby County	1926–27	First Division	25	0	0	0	25	0
Derby County	1927–28	First Division	13	0	0	0	13	0
Derby County	1928–29	First Division	28	0	3	0	31	0
Derby County	1929–30	First Division	17	0	1	0	18	0
Derby County	1930–31	First Division	42	0	1	0	43	0
Derby County	1931–32	First Division	33	1	3	0	36	1
Derby County	1932–33	First Division	36	0	6	0	42	0
Derby County	1933–34	First Division	33	0	4	0	37	0
Derby County	1934–35	First Division	16	0	0	0	16	0
Derby County	Total		248	1	18	0	266	1
Liverpool	1934–35	First Division	23	0	2	0	25	0
Liverpool	1935–36	First Division	26	0	2	0	28	0
Liverpool	1936–37	First Division	39	0	1	0	40	0
Liverpool	1937–38	First Division	26	0	5	0	31	0
Liverpool	1938–39	First Division	36	0	0	0	36	0
Liverpool	Total		150	0	10	0	160	0
Career total			430	1	29	0	259	1

== Honours ==
Derby County

- Football League Second Division second-place promotion: 1925–26

England

- British Home Championship: 1931–32, 1934–35 (shared)

== See also ==
- List of footballers killed during World War II
