= Robert Ireland (footballer, born 1900) =

Scottish footballer

Robert Ireland (born 22 July 1900, date of death unknown) was a Scottish footballer who played as a defender.
