= Jimmy Gray (footballer) =

Scottish footballer

Personal information
- Date of birth: 16 September 1900
- Place of birth: Glasgow, Scotland
- Date of death: 10 May 1978 (aged 77)
- Position(s): Defender

Senior career*
| Years | Team | Apps | (Gls) |
| 1921–1926 | Transvaal | | |
| 1926–1930 | Liverpool | 1 | (0) |
| 1930–1936 | Exeter City | 213 | (0) |
- *Club domestic league appearances and goals

Jimmy Gray (16 September 1900 – 10 May 1978) was a Scottish footballer who played as a defender. He signed for Liverpool in 1926 and made just one appearance in the 1928–29 season.
