= Alastair Henderson =

Scottish footballer

Personal information
- Date of birth: 1911
- Place of birth: Shettleston, Glasgow, Scotland
- Date of death: 1979 (aged 67–68)

Senior career*
Years	Team	Apps	(Gls)
1927–1931	Yoker Athletic		
1931–1933	Liverpool	5	(0)
1933–1935	Clapton Orient		
1935–1936	Ashford		
- * Club domestic league appearances and goals

Alastair Henderson (1911–1979) was a Scottish footballer who played as a defender.

He was signed by Liverpool in 1931 from Scottish Junior club Yoker Athletic but was unable to command a place in their first team. After two seasons he moved to Clapton Orient, again for a two season stay. In 1935 he joined Kent League club Ashford.
