= Ernie Blenkinsop =

English footballer (1902–1969)

Personal information
- Full name: Ernest Blenkinsop
- Date of birth: 20 April 1902
- Place of birth: Cudworth, Barnsley, England
- Date of death: 24 April 1969 (aged 67)
- Place of death: Sheffield, England
- Height: 5 ft 10 1/2 in (1.79 m)
- Position: Left-back

Senior career*
Years	Team	Apps	(Gls)
1917–1921	Cudworth Village		
1921–1923	Hull City	11	(0)
1923–1934	Sheffield Wednesday	393	(5)
1934–1937	Liverpool	71	(0)
1937–1939	Cardiff City	10	(0)
1939	Buxton		
Total		492	(5)

International career
1928–1933	England	26	(0)
- * Club domestic league appearances and goals

Ernest "Ernie" Blenkinsop (20 April 1902 – 24 April 1969) was an English professional footballer who played as a defender at left back.

Regarded as one of the best full-backs of his generation, he began his career with local amateur side Cudworth Village. He joined Hull City in 1921; however, after one year with the club, he signed for Sheffield Wednesday, helping the club win promotion to the First Division before going on to win two Football League titles between 1929 and 1930. He was transferred to fellow First Division side Liverpool in 1934 but his spell with the team was severely disrupted by injury. He later finished his professional career with a season at Cardiff City. During his career, he made over 450 appearances in the Football League and also attained 26 caps playing for England, setting a team record for consecutive appearances which stood until 1957.

== Early life ==
Blenkinsop was born in Cudworth, near Barnsley, West Riding of Yorkshire, England on 20 April 1902 to James Hollings Blenkinsop and Annie Elizabeth Blenkinsop (née Green). One of seven children, he attended St. John's School, Cudworth.

At the age of thirteen, he followed his father and older brother Herbert into work in the coal mine, working at nearby Brierley Colliery. A cave-in at the site nearly resulted in his death, diving to the ground as part of the mine collapsed and burying him in debris. Blenkinsop later stated his belief that had he remained standing the debris would have killed him.

== Club career ==
=== Cudworth Village ===
At the age of fifteen, Blenkinsop began playing local football for Cudworth Village in the Senior Division of the Barnsley Association League alongside his brother. By his late teens, he was regarded as the side's star player, earning 30 shillings a week, and helped them reach the final of the Barnsley and District Challenge Cup during the 1920–21 season. After appearing in the semi-final, he was forced to sit out a replay after opponents Wombwell Main registered a complaint that he had played despite being suspended. The claim was upheld resulting in Cudworth being fined and the match was replayed, Cudworth winning 2–1 to advance to the final. They met Monkwell in the final, played at Oakwell, suffering a 2–0 defeat but a reporter from the Barnsley Independent commented that Blenkinsop had "shone in the middle line."

=== Hull City and Sheffield Wednesday ===
In 1921, several players from Cudworth were attracting attention from professional clubs, including Blenkinsop who was scouted by Doncaster Rovers. However, he went on to sign for Hull City, the transfer fee was reported to be £100 and a barrel of beer for his teammates. Blenkinsop himself received a signing on fee of £10 and saw his weekly wages rise to £5 a week but also insisted on seeing out his notice at Brierly Colliery, only to be turned away by the pit manager who feared a work injury could disrupt his transfer. He was brought to the club by manager Percy Lewis, who had spotted Blenkinsop playing for Cudworth. In later life, Blenkinsop donated eight of his international caps to Lewis as a gift after the manager underwent an operation, in thanks for his part in advancing Blenkinsop's career. The caps were displayed in Lewis' shop that he set up using funds from a benefit match held in his name.

After less than two full seasons and only 11 first-team appearances for Hull City, he was spotted by Sheffield Wednesday boss Bob Brown whilst playing in a reserve fixture as a forward. Brown promptly took him from East to South Yorkshire on 20 January 1923 for £1,250, converting him into a full-back.

Making his debut in a 4–0 defeat to Bury on 27 January 1923, Blenkinsop became a major force behind the rise of the Hillsborough club from struggling at the foot of the Second Division to being promoted as champions at the end of the 1925–26 season, being ever-present in his first full season and missing only one match in their promotion-winning season. They followed this up by becoming back-to-back champions of the First Division in 1928–29 and 1929–30, Blenkinsop making 41 and 45 appearances respectively.

He played in Sheffield Wednesday's 2–1 defeat by Arsenal in the Charity Shield at Stamford Bridge in October 1930. During his eleven-year spell with Wednesday, he made over 400 appearances in all competitions, scoring five times, and was the club's most capped in player in history until his record was surpassed by goalkeeper Ron Springett. He remains the club's most capped outfield player of all time.

=== Liverpool and Cardiff City ===
Blenkinsop was transferred to fellow First Division side Liverpool for £6,500 in March 1934 by Wednesday manager Billy Walker, a decision which caused anger among some Wednesday fans. Liverpool manager George Patterson hoped to recreate the England full-back partnership Blenkinsop and Tom Cooper had together, adding Copper to his squad six months later. Blenkinsop made his debut on 17 March 1934 in a 4–1 victory over Birmingham City at Anfield.

During a 2–1 victory over Derby County on 24 November 1935, he suffered a serious cartilage injury that was believed to have been career-threatening at the time. In January 1935, Liverpool looked to use Blenkinsop's experience despite his injury by appointing him as a non-playing captain for a league match against Blackburn Rovers with the remit of supporting and advising his teammates from the side of the pitch. However, Football Association (FA) guidelines did not permit club representatives to coach players along the boundaries of the pitch and the match referee was instructed to intervene if Blenkinsop attempted to influence play. After undergoing surgery, he returned to fitness and kept his place as club captain for the 1935–36 season.

After retaining his captaincy for the 1936–37 season, Blenkinsop suffered another serious cartilage injury in a Merseyside derby against Everton that ruled him out for the remainder of the season. At the end of the season, a clause was added to his contract that stipulated that if he was not a regular in Liverpool's first team at the end of September 1937, he would be free to leave the club. Having appeared in only two matches in the opening months of the 1937–38 season after being displaced by Benjamin Dabbs, he was placed on the transfer list by mutual consent.

After 71 appearances in a red shirt, on 26 November 1937, completed a transfer to Welsh club Cardiff City in the Third Division South. He made his debut for the club on 4 December 1937 in a 3–2 victory over Millwall but his appearances throughout the season were sporadic, making eleven appearances in all competitions. At the end of the season, he retired from playing but took up a coaching role with the club before leaving a year later following the appointment of Cyril Spiers as manager.

He moved north to Derbyshire, where he played for Buxton. He then returned to Yorkshire, representing Halifax Town, Bradford Park Avenue and Bradford City as a wartime guest.

== International career ==
Blenkinsop caught the eye of the Football Association selectors in 1928 who choose him to play for England in a friendly match against France on 17 May 1928, at the Stade Olympique Yves-du-Manoir, Colombes, Paris. He helped the side record a 5–1 victory.

In his 21st appearance for the national side, he was handed the captaincy of England for another friendly on 9 December 1931 at Arsenal's Highbury ground. The visitors were Spain, with England winning 7–1. He went on to captain England five times in total, including his final cap against Scotland, winning four and losing the other. All of his caps came in consecutive England fixtures; playing a total of 26 matches between 17 May 1928 and 1 April 1933. This record was subsequently beaten by Roger Byrne who appeared in 33 consecutive England games from his debut to his death in the Munich air disaster.

== Personal life ==
Blenkinsop married Winifred Stewart at Wadsley Parish Church in Sheffield on 1 June 1926; they had two children: Beryl and Barry. After retiring from professional football, he worked as an iron foundry labourer and after the war, became licensee of the Sportsman public house at Crosspool, Sheffield and remained so until his death on 24 April 1969, four days after his 67th birthday.

== Career statistics ==
Club	Season	League			FA Cup		Other (Note: Includes appearance in the 1930 FA Charity Shield.)		Total	
Club	Season	Division	Apps	Goals	Apps	Goals	Apps	Goals	Apps	Goals
Hull City	1921–22	Second Division	3	0	0	0	—		3	0
Hull City	1922–23	Second Division	8	0	0	0	—		8	0
Hull City	Total		11	0	0	0	0	0	11	0
Sheffield Wednesday	1922–23	Second Division	16	0	2	0	—		18	0
Sheffield Wednesday	1923–24	Second Division	42	0	3	0	—		45	0
Sheffield Wednesday	1924–25	Second Division	14	0	0	0	—		14	0
Sheffield Wednesday	1925–26	Second Division	41	4	1	0	—		42	4
Sheffield Wednesday	1926–27	First Division	37	0	3	0	—		40	0
Sheffield Wednesday	1927–28	First Division	39	0	4	0	—		43	0
Sheffield Wednesday	1928–29	First Division	39	1	2	0	—		41	1
Sheffield Wednesday	1929–30	First Division	39	0	6	0	—		45	0
Sheffield Wednesday	1930–31	First Division	40	0	2	0	1	0	43	0
Sheffield Wednesday	1931–32	First Division	37	0	5	0	—		42	0
Sheffield Wednesday	1932–33	First Division	23	0	0	0	—		23	0
Sheffield Wednesday	1933–34	First Division	26	0	3	0	—		29	0
Sheffield Wednesday	Total		393	5	31	0	1	0	425	5
Liverpool	1933–34	First Division	9	0	0	0	—		9	0
Liverpool	1934–35	First Division	16	0	0	0	—		16	0
Liverpool	1935–36	First Division	37	0	0	0	—		37	0
Liverpool	1936–37	First Division	7	0	0	0	—		7	0
Liverpool	1937–38	First Division	2	0	0	0	—		2	0
Liverpool	Total		71	0	0	0	0	0	71	0
Cardiff City	1937–38	Third Division South	10	0	1	0	—		11	0
Career Total			485	5	32	0	1	0	518	5

== Honours ==
Sheffield Wednesday

- Football League Second Division winner: 1925–26
- Football League First Division winner: 1928–29, 1929–30
