= Charlie Thompson (footballer, born 1909) =

South African-born English footballer

Personal information
- Date of birth: April 1909
- Place of birth: Johannesburg, South Africa
- Date of death: 1979 (aged 69–70)
- Position: Midfielder

Senior career*
Years	Team	Apps	(Gls)
1929–1931	Liverpool	5	(0)
1931–1932	Blackpool	0	(0)
1932	Barrow	19	(0)
- * Club domestic league appearances and goals

Charles Thompson (April 1909 – 1979) was an English professional footballer. He played as a midfielder for Liverpool and Barrow. He was also on the books of Blackpool.
