= John McFarlane (footballer, born 1905) =

Scottish footballer

Personal information
- Date of birth: 24 December 1905
- Place of birth: Shettleston, Scotland
- Height: 5 ft 7 in (1.70 m)
- Positions: Centre forward; inside right

Senior career*
Years	Team	Apps	(Gls)
–	Shawfield		
1926–1928	Aberdeen	7	(0)
1928–1930	Liverpool	2	(0)
1930–1932	Halifax Town	65	(15)
1932–1933	Northampton Town	3	(1)
1933–1935	Kidderminster Harriers		
1935–1937	Darlington	18	(1)
1937–1938	Worcester City		
1938–1939	Bath City		
Total		95	(17)
- * Club domestic league appearances and goals

John McFarlane (born 24 December 1905) was a Scottish footballer who played as a striker.
