= Allan Scott (footballer) =

English footballer

Personal information
- Date of birth: 17 August 1910
- Place of birth: Birkenhead, England
- Position: Inside right

Youth career
- Liverpool Pembians

Senior career*
Years	Team	Apps	(Gls)
1929–1932	Liverpool	3	(2)
1932–1933	Swindon Town	18	(3)
1933–1934	Gillingham	25	(11)
- London Paper Mills
- * Club domestic league appearances and goals

Allan Scott (born 17 August 1910, date of death unknown) was an English footballer who played as a striker for Liverpool, Swindon Town and Gillingham.
