= Bill Murray (footballer, born 1904) =

Scottish footballer

Bill Murray (9 November 1904 in Alexandria, Scotland – 1940) was a Scottish footballer who played as a defender.
