= Fred Rogers (footballer) =

English footballer

Fred Rogers (born 17 April 1910) was an English footballer who played as a defender for Liverpool in the Football League. Rogers started his career at amateur side Helsby Athletic before he signed professional terms with Liverpool. He signed for Liverpool in 1934, but only made 7 appearances during those years, as he was unable to displace Matt Busby and Tom Morrison in the side. He made more appearances in the 1937–38 season appearing 24 times for the club. A further 30 appearances were made the following season, which was to be his last at the club. The Second World War interrupted his career, as he never played for Liverpool after the war.
