= Les Bruton =

English footballer

Personal information
- Full name: Leslie Hector Ronald Bruton
- Date of birth: 1 April 1903
- Place of birth: Foleshill, England
- Date of death: 2 April 1989 (aged 86)
- Place of death: Coventry, England
- Height: 5 ft 9 in (1.75 m)
- Position: Centre-forward

Youth career
- Bell Green Wesleyans
- Foleshill

Senior career*
Years	Team	Apps	(Gls)
1922–1926	Southampton	7	(0)
1926–1927	Peterborough & Fletton United		
1927–1929	Raith Rovers		
1929–1932	Blackburn Rovers	38	(23)
1932–1933	Liverpool	6	(1)
1933–19??	Leamington Town		
- * Club domestic league appearances and goals

Leslie Hector Ronald Bruton (1 April 1903 – 2 April 1989) was an English footballer who played at centre-forward in the 1920s and 1930s for various clubs, having his most successful period with Blackburn Rovers.

== Football career ==
Bruton was born in Foleshill, Coventry and played for his local non-league side where he was spotted by a scout from Southampton. He signed for the "Saints" for a fee of £15 in November 1922; after spending a season in the reserves, Bruton made his first-team debut on 6 October 1923, when he took the place of Arthur Dominy at inside-left at home to Bristol City. He retained his place for five matches before Doniny's return. Failing to make much impression, Bruton had to wait a further two years before any further first-team action, but after two more games at the end of the 1925–26 season, he was released.

Bruton then dropped into non-League football when he joined Peterborough & Fletton United of the Southern League in the summer of 1926. This was followed by a move to Scotland, when he joined Raith Rovers in November 1927.

In May 1929, he returned to England with Blackburn Rovers for a fee of £10,000. In his first season at Ewood Park, Bruton took over from Clarrie Bourton at centre-forward, making twelve league appearances, scoring five goals. In the following season, Bruton scored 18 goals from 24 league appearances, making him Rovers' second-best top-scorer, just behind his unrelated namesake Jack Bruton on 19. Les Bruton also made an important contribution to Rovers' run in the FA Cup, scoring five goals including a hat-trick in the fourth round victory over Bristol Rovers.

For the 1931–32 season, Bruton lost his regular place at centre-forward to Ernie Thompson and made only two further appearances, before a move to Liverpool in February 1932.

He made his Liverpool debut away to West Ham United on 20 February 1932. He also played in the Anfield FA Cup defeat by Chelsea a week later. He made six more league appearances the following season plus another in the FA Cup, with his only goal for the club being at Chelsea on 27 December 1932.

In July 1933, he returned to non-league football with Leamington Town. He later had a spell on Coventry City's coaching staff.
