= Danny McRorie =

Scottish footballer

Personal information
- Full name: Daniel McRorie
- Date of birth: 25 June 1906
- Place of birth: Hutchesontown, Scotland
- Date of death: 26 July 1963 (aged 57)
- Position: Outside right

Youth career
- Queen's Park Strollers

Senior career*
Years	Team	Apps	(Gls)
1926–1927	Airdrieonians	8	(5)
1927–1928	Stenhousemuir	26	(4)
1928	Alloa Athletic	9	(5)
1928–1930	Morton	76	(51)
1930–1933	Liverpool	33	(6)
1933	Rochdale	5	(0)
1933	Morton	1	(1)
1934–1936	Runcorn		
Total		158	(72)

International career
1930	Scottish Football League XI	1	(0)
1930	Scotland	1	(0)
- * Club domestic league appearances and goals

Daniel McRorie (25 June 1906 – 26 July 1963) was a Scottish footballer who played as an outside right for clubs including Liverpool in the Football League.

McRorie started his career with Queen's Park Strollers, before he moved to Airdrieonians, Stenhousemuir, Alloa Athletic and then Morton, where he enjoyed a prolific scoring spell in the 1928–29 Scottish Division Two season (27 goals in 36 appearances) as the club gained promotion, followed by another in the top tier at the start of 1930–31 (18 goals from 13 games) which drew attention from English clubs.

He moved to Liverpool in November 1930 and made three appearances during his debut season; he played 25 out of 29 league matches during the 1931–32 season, but only made five appearances in the next season and was sold in 1933.

McRorie was selected once by Scotland, in a 1–1 draw with Wales in the 1930–31 British Home Championship. He also played once for the Scottish Football League XI.
