= Gordon Hodgson =

Footballer, football manager (1904–1951)

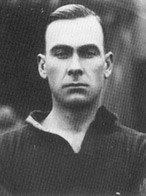
- Hodgson in the 1932–33 season

Personal information
- Date of birth: 16 April 1904
- Place of birth: Benoni, Transvaal Colony
- Date of death: 14 June 1951 (aged 47)
- Place of death: Stoke-on-Trent, England
- Height: 6 ft 2 in (1.87 m)
- Position: Forward

Youth career
- 1919–1921: Benoni
- 1921–1922: Rustenburg
- 1922–1924: Pretoria
- 1924–1925: Transvaal

Senior career*
Years	Team	Apps	(Gls)
1925–1936	Liverpool	358	(233)
1936–1937	Aston Villa	28	(11)
1937–1939	Leeds United	81	(51)
Total		467	(295)

International career
1924	South Africa	2	(0)
1930–1931	England	3	(1)
	The Football League	2	(0)

Managerial career
- 1946–1951: Port Vale
- * Club domestic league appearances and goals

Gordon Hodgson (16 April 1904 – 14 June 1951) was a professional sportsman, born in Transvaal Colony, who is best known as a striker for Liverpool and as a fast bowler for Lancashire. He won two international caps at football for South Africa and three for England. He is the fourth-highest goalscorer in English top-flight history and Liverpool's fourth all-time leading goalscorer.

Hodgson signed for Liverpool in December 1925, going on to score 241 goals in 377 appearances for the club. He was the club's record goalscorer until being surpassed by Roger Hunt in 1969. He transferred to Aston Villa in January 1936 and scored 11 goals in 28 appearances, before joining Leeds United in March 1937, scoring 53 goals in 85 appearances for the club. In total, Hodgson scored 305 goals in 490 appearances for his three English clubs, 295 of which came in 467 games in the Football League, with the other ten coming in the FA Cup from 23 appearances.

He was appointed Port Vale manager in 1946, a position he would hold until he died in 1951.

== Early and personal life ==
Gordon Hodgson was born on 16 April 1904 in Benoni, Transvaal Colony to English parents. He married Doris Huckell, on 23 November 1928 at West Derby Register Office. They had two children: Doreen T. (born 1930) and Gordon (born 1934), before Doris died at the age of 27 on 8 March 1938, at Preston Parade in Beeston, Leeds. Gordon then met Alice Shepherd and they were married on 26 October 1940 at Hunslet Parish Church. Their son, Martyn was born the following year.

== Football career ==
=== Club career ===
Hodgson played football in South Africa with Benoni (1919–21), Rustenburg (1921–22), Pretoria (1922–24), and then Transvaal (1924–25). He scored a hat-trick against Liverpool for the South African Amateur team during a tour of the UK on 1 October 1924 and was signed by the club on 14 December 1925. During his time in South Africa he worked as a boilermaker.

==== Liverpool ====
Hodgson had a reputation early in his career as an unselfish forward who excelled in link-up play, but that didn't stop him from going on to become one of Liverpool and indeed the Football League's greatest-ever goalscorers. Not averse to charging through defenders if other avenues to goal were barred, although he was capable of subtlety when the situation demanded it, Hodgson was exceptionally strong on the ball and possessed a terrific shot with either foot, which allied to his height, heading ability, pace, close-control, enthusiasm and a noted talent for shooting when going at top-speed made him a real force in attack. Only Roger Hunt (244) has scored more league goals for Liverpool, but all of Hodgson's 233 league strikes came in the top flight from 358 appearances, a fantastic goals-per-game ratio. In total Hodgson scored 295 goals in 467 games in the Football League, 288 of which came in the top-flight from 454 appearances, leaving him fourth in the all-time list of top-flight goalscorers in English football with only Jimmy Greaves (357), Steve Bloomer (314) and Dixie Dean (310) having scored more. Hodgson first came to Liverpool's attention in 1924 as one of the youngest members of the touring South African national team, who on 1 October beat Liverpool 5–2 at Anfield. He joined Liverpool a year later on 14 December 1925, making his debut in a 1–1 draw against Manchester City at Maine Road on 27 February 1926. He opened his goal-scoring account eleven days later when he scored twice in a 3–3 draw against Manchester United at Old Trafford on 10 March 1926. He scored the first of a still club record 17 league hat-tricks for Liverpool in a 5–1 win against Sheffield United at Anfield on 11 September 1926 in his 17th game.

During his Anfield career, Hodgson missed very few games in the league or cup and scored prolifically throughout; therefore, it was a shame that his career coincided with a barren period for the club because his contribution to the Liverpool cause was massive. The 36 league goals Hodgson scored during the 1930–31 season beat Sam Raybould's total of 31 scored in 1902–03 and set a new club record that would last for more than thirty years until it was beaten by Roger Hunt in 1961–62. Hodgson scored three hat-tricks that season at Anfield, but perhaps it was the four goals he scored in an away match at Hillsborough that gave him the most satisfaction of all. He was the top scorer in seven out of the nine full seasons he played for Liverpool. On completion of his ten years of service, he was honoured by the club with a benefit sum of £650. His popularity prompted an ingenious biscuit seller to name the home-made ginger nuts, that he sold in a quantity of five for a penny on matchdays at Anfield, in his honour: "Hodgson's Choice! Hodgson's Choice!" he would call. The 1935–36 season proved to be Hodgson's last at Anfield; his nine goals in 17 league appearances was yet again a decent return, but on 8 January 1936, he was allowed to move to Aston Villa for £4,000. In total Hodgson scored 241 goals in 377 appearances for Liverpool in all competitions, earning him a place in the Liverpool FC Hall of Fame and leaving him third in the all-time list of leading goalscorers for the Anfield club with only Ian Rush (346) and Roger Hunt (285) having scored more.

==== Aston Villa ====
Hodgson made his debut for Aston Villa in a 3–0 defeat against Preston North End at Deepdale on 18 January 1936. His first goal for Villa came in a 4–3 defeat against Bolton Wanderers at Burnden Park on 15 February 1936. He was relegated with Aston Villa at the end of the 1935–36 season, his four goals in 15 league appearances not enough to help them beat the drop. His stay with Villa in the Second Division was short. He left for Leeds United for £1,500 on 2 March 1937, after scoring seven goals in 13 appearances for Villa in the Second Division, including a hat-trick in a 5–1 win against Bradford City at Villa Park on 14 September 1936. In total Hodgson scored 11 goals in 28 appearances for Villa, all of which were in the league.

==== Leeds United ====
At Leeds United, Hodgson showed that he still had what it took to score goals at the top level, scoring six goals in 13 league appearances in the second half of the 1936–37 season, including a goal on his debut in a 7–1 defeat against his old Merseyside rivals Everton at Goodison Park on 3 March 1937. Despite that defeat Hodgson's goals still proved enough to help Leeds avoid relegation. The following season, 1937–38, Leeds secured a top-half finish thanks in no small part to Hodgson, who scored 26 goals in 38 appearances in all competitions, including all four Leeds goals in a 4–4 draw against Everton at Elland Road on 26 February 1938. His form was all the more remarkable considering the strain he'd been playing under as a result of the illness and subsequent death of his wife on 8 March 1938, leaving him a widower with two children. Hodgson continued to show admirable professionalism and was as prolific as ever during the 1938–39 season, scoring 21 goals in 34 appearances in all competitions, including a still Leeds club record five goals in their 8–2 thrashing of Leicester City at Elland Road on 1 October 1938. Hodgson scored 53 goals in 85 appearances for Leeds in all competitions, not including one in the 1939–40 season, which was abandoned after three games due to the outbreak of World War II. He was top scorer for Leeds in both of his two full seasons at Elland Road. During the war, Hodgson worked in a munitions factory whilst continuing to turn out for Leeds until 1941, making 34 war-time appearances for the Elland Road club, scoring 14 goals. He also guested for Hartlepools United (one appearance, 1939–40) and York City (five appearances, two goals, 1939–40). After hanging up his boots he helped to coach the youth players at Leeds from 1942 to October 1946.

=== International career ===
Hodgson played twice at full international level for his native South Africa, making his debut in a 2–1 win in a friendly against Ireland at Solitude, Belfast on 24 September 1924, in what was also South Africa's first ever full international match. His second and final international appearance for South Africa came against the Netherlands in a 2–1 defeat in a friendly at het Nederlandsche Sportpark (het Oude Stadion), Amsterdam on 2 November 1924. He also played and scored in several unofficial international matches for South Africa against British, Dutch, and Irish club sides during a 1924 tour, including appearances against Wimbledon and Liverpool; which is where they first noticed his talent and subsequently signed him the following year.

Hodgson was also capped three times at full international level by England, making his debut against Ireland, in a 5–1 win in a British Home Championship, match at Bramall Lane, Sheffield on 20 October 1930. His only goal for England came in his second appearance in a 4–0 win against Wales in a British Home Championship match at the Racecourse Ground, Wrexham on 22 November 1930. Hodgson's third and final international appearance for England came against Scotland in a 2–0 defeat in a British Home Championship match at Hampden Park, Glasgow on 28 March 1931. He also represented England against the Rest in a 3–2 win in an international trial match at Highbury, London on 4 March 1931 and the Football League against the Scottish League, scoring once in a 7–3 win in an Inter-League match at White Hart Lane, London on 5 November 1930.

== Cricket career ==
As well as being an outstanding footballer, Hodgson was also a talented cricketer. He once took all ten wickets in an innings for just 13 runs in an amateur match against Liverpool Police. Seeing his obvious potential, Lancashire soon signed him up to play for them. An extremely quick right-arm fast bowler and hard-hitting lower order right-hand batsman, Hodgson played 56 first-class matches for the Red Rose county from 1928 to 1933, scoring 244 runs at an average of 6.97 and taking 148 wickets at an average of 27.75. He also took 38 catches.

His highest score in first-class cricket was 20 for Lancashire against India at Aigburth in 1932. His best bowling figures in first-class cricket were 6–77 for Lancashire against Middlesex at Lord's in 1932. Hodgson twice helped Lancashire to win the County Championship, in 1928 and 1930, although his football career took priority, as he didn't play a single game of cricket in April or September (and only one Second XI match in August) throughout his time at Old Trafford.

In 1935 and 1936, Hodgson was employed as professional for Forfarshire in Scotland. His second season at the club was cut short in August due to Aston Villa's request he return to Birmingham for pre-season training.

== Football management career ==
=== Port Vale ===
After the war, Hodgson went into management, taking over the reins at Third Division South club Port Vale in October 1946. He was manager when the club moved from the Old Recreation Ground to their new home of Vale Park in 1950. Unfortunately, most of the money the club raised went towards the new ground, leaving Hodgson unable to spend money in the transfer market. This included the £12,000 he got for right-half Bill McGarry, and the £20,000 he got from the sale of striker Ronnie Allen. Hodgson managed Port Vale in 222 matches, winning 84, drawing 54 and losing 84. He was greatly respected both for his pre-war sporting career and also for encouraging young footballers in north Staffordshire. He had a reputation for having the ability to spot talented players and was not afraid to blood them in the league, and was also a good motivator. He applied for the vacant management position at Everton in September 1948.

=== Final years and death ===
Following the resignation of Liverpool manager George Kay in January 1951 for health reasons, Hodgson was among the hopefuls who were interviewed for the manager's job at Anfield. Don Welsh was eventually appointed, while Hodgson was admitted to hospital a couple of months later, but his "throat complaint" was deemed inoperable. He returned to his home in Burslem after a month in hospital. A few days later, with a promising managerial career still in its infancy, he died of cancer on 14 June 1951, at the age of 47. Port Vale legend Roy Sproson had Hodgson as his first boss: "Gordon Hodgson was a fair chap. He would give you a rollicking one minute and then it would be forgotten. Everybody liked him and his loss was so sad." His benefit match was held against Port Vale's local rivals Stoke City on 1 October 1951; Vale lost the game 2–1. £383 was raised for his dependants.

== Career statistics ==
=== Club ===
Appearances and goals by club, season and competition
Club	Season	League			FA Cup		Other		Total	
Club	Season	Division	Apps	Goals	Apps	Goals	Apps	Goals	Apps	Goals
Liverpool	1925–26	First Division	12	4	0	0	0	0	12	4
Liverpool	1926–27	First Division	36	16	4	2	0	0	40	18
Liverpool	1927–28	First Division	32	23	0	0	0	0	32	23
Liverpool	1928–29	First Division	38	30	3	2	0	0	41	32
Liverpool	1929–30	First Division	36	14	1	0	0	0	37	14
Liverpool	1930–31	First Division	40	36	1	0	0	0	41	36
Liverpool	1931–32	First Division	39	26	4	1	0	0	43	27
Liverpool	1932–33	First Division	37	24	1	0	0	0	39	24
Liverpool	1933–34	First Division	37	24	3	1	0	0	40	25
Liverpool	1934–35	First Division	34	27	2	2	0	0	36	29
Liverpool	1935–36	First Division	17	9	0	0	0	0	17	9
Liverpool	Total		358	233	19	8	0	0	378	241
Aston Villa	1935–36	First Division	15	4	0	0	0	0	15	4
Aston Villa	1936–37	Second Division	13	7	0	0	0	0	13	7
Aston Villa	Total		28	11	0	0	0	0	28	11
Leeds United	1936–37	First Division	13	6	0	0	0	0	13	6
Leeds United	1937–38	First Division	36	25	2	1	0	0	38	26
Leeds United	1938–39	First Division	32	20	2	1	0	0	34	21
Leeds United	1939–40	First Division	0	0	0	0	1 (Note: Appearance in the Football League First Division. At the outbreak of the Second World War, the Football League was suspended and matches up to that point struck from the records.)	0	1	0
Leeds United	Total		81	51	4	2	1	0	86	53
Career total			467	295	23	10	1	0	492	305

=== International ===
Appearances and goals by national team and year
National team	Year	Apps	Goals
South Africa	1924	2	0
Total		2	0
England	1930	2	1
England	1931	1	0
Total		3	1

=== Managerial ===
Managerial record by team and tenure
Team	From	To	Record				
Team	From	To	P	W	D	L	Win %
Port Vale	1 October 1946	14 June 1951	222	84	54	84	37.8
Total			222	84	54	84	37.8

== Honours ==
England

- British Home Championship: 1930–31 (shared)

== See also ==
- List of English football first tier top scorers
- List of England international footballers born outside England
- List of English cricket and football players
