= Henry Race =

English footballer (1906–1942)

Henry Race (7 January 1906 – 24 October 1942) was an English footballer who played as a forward for Liverpool in The Football League starting on 15 February 1928. Race played for Raby United before he signed for Liverpool. He made 11 appearances during his debut season. He was unable to hold down a regular place in the starting lineup in his career at Liverpool, and eventually left in 1930.

Race was killed during World War II at El Alamein in Egypt on 24 October 1942. He was a Corporal for Queen's Own Cameron Highlanders.
