= Dave Wright (Scottish footballer) =

Scottish footballer (1905–1955)

Personal information
- Full name: David Wright
- Date of birth: 5 October 1905
- Place of birth: Kirkcaldy, Scotland
- Date of death: 1955 (aged 49–50)
- Position: Forward

Senior career*
Years	Team	Apps	(Gls)
1922–1923	Dunniker Juniors		
1923–1924	Raith Rovers	0	(0)
1924–1926	East Fife	52	(25)
1926–1927	Cowdenbeath	35	(17)
1927–1930	Sunderland	52	(7)
1930–1934	Liverpool	93	(35)
1934–1935	Hull City	32	(11)
1935–1936	Bradford Park Avenue	20	(1)
- * Club domestic league appearances and goals

David Wright (5 October 1905 – 1955) was a Scottish footballer who played for Liverpool.

== Life and playing career ==
Born in Kirkcaldy, Fife, Scotland, Wright played for East Fife, Cowdenbeath and Sunderland before George Patterson signed him for Liverpool in March 1930. His debut came at Anfield as Liverpool drew 0–0 with Newcastle in a 1st Division match on 21 April 1930. His first goal came 10 months later on 7 February 1931, also against Newcastle: Wright scored a hat-trick in the 4–2 win, the goals coming in the 21st, 60th and 80th minutes.

Wright was originally used as back-up for Jimmy Smith and because of this was called upon just 15 times in his first full season, even though during one of these appearances he scored a hat-trick. The following season was much better for Wright as he began the campaign by scoring 5 goals in the first 4 fixtures, he ended with 13 goals in his 35 starts. Wright followed this up with a 14-goal total during the 1932–33.

Wright began as first choice at the beginning of the 1933–34 season starting in 9 of the first 10 games, he, however, lost his place to Syd Roberts and although Roberts couldn't hold on to the position it was Harold Taylor rather than Wright that got the nod.

Wright played exactly 100 games for the Reds with the 100th coming on 31 March 1934, Derby were the visitors to Anfield for a league game that saw Liverpool gain a 4–2 victory.

Wright left Liverpool in July 1934 joining Hull, he went on to represent Bradford Park Avenue before retiring. He died in his hometown in 1955.
