= Dick Edmed =

English footballer

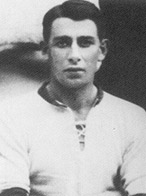

Personal information
- Full name: Richard Alfred Edmed
- Date of birth: 14 February 1904
- Place of birth: Gillingham, Kent, England
- Date of death: 14 February 1984 (aged 80)
- Place of death: Gillingham, England
- Position: Outside right

Youth career
- 1919–1921: Chatham Centrals
- 1921–1923: Rochester

Senior career*
Years	Team	Apps	(Gls)
1923–1926	Gillingham	24	(7)
1926–1932	Liverpool	160	(44)
1932–1933	Bolton Wanderers	4	(1)
Total		188	(52)
- * Club domestic league appearances and goals

Richard Edmed (14 February 1904 – 14 February 1984) was an English footballer best known for his time playing for Liverpool.

== Life and playing career ==
Born in Gillingham, Kent, Edmed played for Chatham Centrals, Rochester and Gillingham before being signed by Liverpool manager Matt McQueen in January 1926 for £1800. He couldn't have made his debut in a more important game if he had tried, it was the visit to Anfield by bitter rivals Manchester United in a Division One match on 28 August 1926, Liverpool made it a happy day for Edmed as they beat United 4–2 with Dick Forshaw bagging a hat-trick, his goalscoring account was opened 6 days later on 4 September at the Baseball Ground, but Derby County won the game 2–1.

Edmed, a winger, went straight into the starting line-up and stayed there for the rest of his first season missing only four matches. He, again, couldn't be shifted from his spot the following year when he was an ever-present, along with Tom Bromilow, scoring 14 times, he was the club's spot-kick taker which helped him score as many as he did from the wide position. He was to score two more (16) the following season, missing just three games, this total was even more remarkable as his penalty duties were given to Robert Done.

He started the next campaign and was again a permanent fixture in the side until he picked an injury towards the end of the season. He was to play just a dozen times during the 1930–31 campaign and eventually lost his place to Harold Barton.

After spending six years at the club, appearing 170 times and scoring 46 goals, Edmed was allowed to leave and joined his final club, Bolton Wanderers, in May 1932.

He scored on his Bolton debut, ironically against Liverpool, in an 8–1 win for his new team at Burnden Park.

He died on his birthday 14 February 1984.
