= Ted Savage (footballer) =

English footballer

Robert Edward Savage (30 November 1911 – 30 January 1964) was an English footballer who played at wing-half for Liverpool

== Life and playing career ==
Born in Louth, Lincolnshire, England, Savage played for Stewton F.C. and Lincoln City F.C. before he was bought by Liverpool manager George Patterson in May 1931. He made his debut on 26 September 1931 in a First Division match at Anfield. Grimsby Town F.C. were the visitors and were comfortably beaten 4–0. Savage scored twice, in the 66th and 82nd minutes (Gordon Hodgson also scored twice, in the 26th and 85th minutes). Savage was able to get the chance to score the goals as he was played in the forward line instead of his usual position of wing-half.

The two strikes against Grimsby were the only goals he would score during his time at Liverpool. In fact, Savage struggled to hold down a starting role for the Anfield club, his best seasons were the 1934–35 and 1935–36 seasons where he played in 54 of the 84 matches, 27 in each season. Although Savage was mainly used as a 'bit part' player during other campaigns, he put together 105 appearances, 100 of which were in the league.

Savage's final Liverpool outing came in a league game at Molineux Stadium on 16 October 1936 with Wolverhampton Wanderers running out 2–0 winners. Savage was allowed to leave Anfield for rivals Manchester United F.C. midway through the 1937–38 season. He went on to become a journeyman playing for Wrexham A.F.C. in North Wales, Carlisle United F.C. in Cumbria, West Ham United F.C., Chelsea and Fulham F.C. in London. All this travelling added to spells in Lincolnshire, Merseyside and Lancashire.

He also played for Millwall F.C. and York City F.C. as a wartime guest.

Savage was manager of Dutch clubs ZVV and Zeeburgia.

== Career details ==
- Liverpool (1931–1938): 105 appearances, 2 goals
