= Harold Barton (footballer) =

English footballer (1910–1969)

Personal information
- Date of birth: 3 August 1910
- Place of birth: Leigh, England
- Date of death: 1969 (aged 58–59)
- Place of death: Sheffield, England
- Height: 5 ft 8 1/2 in (1.74 m)
- Position: Forward

Youth career
- 1927–1928: Whitegate Juniors

Senior career*
Years	Team	Apps	(Gls)
1928–1934	Liverpool	103	(25)
1934–1946	Sheffield United	184	(41)
- * Club domestic league appearances and goals

Harold Barton (3 August 1910 – 1969) was an English footballer who played as forward. Born in Leigh, Lancashire, he played for Liverpool, for whom he made over 100 appearances, and Sheffield United, for whom he played over 200 times.

== Playing career ==
=== Liverpool ===
Barton was an amateur at Whitegate Juniors before he was signed by George Patterson for Liverpool in November 1928. He didn't make his debut for the Reds however, until 9 October 1929 in a 1st Division match at Anfield against Blackburn in a 1–1 draw. As a forward, he struggled at first to secure a regular place, making only 12 total appearances during his first season at Anfield. The start of the following campaign was no different either as Barton was overlooked for the opening dozen fixtures of the season. He finally got the nod in November 1930 and made 26 appearances during the run in. It wasn't until 7 February 1931 that he scored his first goal for the club in a home league match against Newcastle.

Barton's best season in the red of Liverpool was to be the 1932–33 season when he made 36 appearances, scoring 13 goals which included a hat-trick in a 7–4 win over Everton in the Merseyside derby at Anfield on 11 February 1933. Having lost his place in the side Barton's Liverpool days drew to an end in the June 1934 when he was signed by Sheffield United during the close season.

=== Sheffield United ===
A first team regular during his time at Bramall Lane Barton was equally at home on either wing, although primarily used as an outside-right and was said to have a hard and accurate shot. Despite this he was often criticised for being inconsistent and sulking if he felt the opposition were not playing in the spirit of the game.

Barton asked for a transfer in 1935 but remained at the club and played in the 1936 FA Cup Final for the Blades in which they lost 1–0 to Arsenal. Despite his form United accepted a £2,500 offer from Spurs in May 1936, a move which Barton rejected. He remained at Bramall Lane and was the club again tried to sell him in 1938 for the same price, this time to Bradford City but again Barton refused to leave. In spite of this he once again asked for a transfer in January 1939 after being the target of abuse from the fans but remained with the club as they gained promotion from Division Two.

With the outbreak of World War II Barton worked in Sheffield and continued to play for the Blades along with guesting for Bradford, Chesterfield, Lincoln City, Rotherham United and Sheffield Wednesday.

During the war-time seasons of 1943–44 and 1944–45 he appeared as guest player with Rotherham United in the North Regional League and the War Cup Competition, during which he scored 19 goals. His most memorable game was at Barnsley's Oakwell Ground on 18.11.1944 when he scored three times from the penalty-spot. His dismay can perhaps be imagined when, despite the visitors scoring five goals, the home side won with what was virtually the last kick of the game. Therefore, on the following Saturday in the return match at Millmoor he must have had much satisfaction from converting a penalty for what was the only goal of the game.

== Personal life ==
Barton didn't return to playing professionally after World War II. Instead, he became a publican in Sheffield, where he died in the summer of 1969.

== Honours ==
Sheffield United

- FA Cup runner-up: 1935–36
- Football League Second Division runner-up: 1938–39
