= Syd Roberts =

English footballer

Personal information
- Date of birth: March 1911
- Place of birth: Bootle, England
- Position: Inside forward

Youth career
- 1929–1932: Liverpool

Senior career*
Years	Team	Apps	(Gls)
1932–1937	Liverpool	58	(10)
- Shrewsbury Town
- Chester
- Northfleet United
- * Club domestic league appearances and goals

Syd Roberts (March 1911 – after 1938) was an English professional footballer who played as an inside forward.

== Career ==
Born in Bootle, Roberts signed for Liverpool in 1929, and made his senior debut in April 1932. He left Liverpool in August 1937, later playing for Shrewsbury Town, Chester and Northfleet United.
