= Tom Bradshaw (footballer, born 1904) =

Scottish footballer (1904–1986)

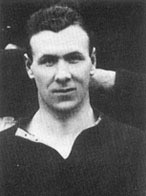

Personal information
- Date of birth: 7 February 1904
- Place of birth: Bishopton, Scotland
- Date of death: 22 February 1986 (aged 82)
- Place of death: Coatbridge, Scotland
- Position: Wing half

Youth career
- 1920–1922: Woodside Juniors

Senior career*
Years	Team	Apps	(Gls)
1922–1930	Bury		
1930–1938	Liverpool	277	(3)
1938–1939	Third Lanark	5	(0)
1939	South Liverpool		

International career
1928	Scotland	1	(0)
- * Club domestic league appearances and goals

Thomas Bradshaw (7 February 1904 – 22 February 1986) was a Scottish footballer of the 1920s and 1930s, who played for Bury, Liverpool, Third Lanark and South Liverpool. He also played once for the Scotland national football team, in their 5–1 win against England in 1928. A large, physically imposing player, Bradshaw was ironically nicknamed 'Tiny'.

== Playing career ==
=== Bury ===
He began his professional career with English side Bury, in 1922, having been signed from local amateur side Woodside Juniors. A wing-half or centre-half, Bradshaw spent eight years with the Lancashire club.

=== Wembley Wizards ===
Bradshaw was called up for his senior international debut on 31 March 1928 at Wembley Stadium in a 5–1 win over England, a performance that saw the Scotland side dubbed the 'Wembley Wizards'. In his one game for Scotland Bradshaw directly nullified Dixie Dean, England's most potent goalscorer of his generation. Despite such a notable individual and team performance, Bradshaw was the only wizard to have this game as their only full cap.

=== Liverpool ===
Two years later, in January 1930, Liverpool manager George Patterson paid £8000 for his services, he made his debut on 25 January at Anfield against Manchester United. It was a day to remember as Liverpool won the game 1–0. His first goal for Liverpool came on 3 September 1932 in a match against Newcastle United, where Newcastle won a 4–3 thriller. Tom stayed at the Merseyside club for eight years, playing most of his games at centre-back, eventually racking up 291 appearances.

=== Later career in football ===
Following his departure in 1938, Bradshaw had short spells with Third Lanark and South Liverpool, before retiring to work as a scout for Norwich City for a period of time. In 1947–48 Bradshaw was coach in the Netherlands at 't Gooi.
