= Archie McPherson (footballer) =

Scottish footballer (1909–1969)

Personal information
- Full name: Archibald Johnston McPherson
- Date of birth: 10 February 1909
- Place of birth: Buchanan, Stirling, Scotland
- Date of death: 1969 (aged 59–60)
- Place of death: Alloa, Scotland
- Height: 5 ft 8 1/2 in (1.74 m)
- Positions: Inside left; left half

Senior career*
Years	Team	Apps	(Gls)
–	Alva Albion Rangers		
1928–1929	Rangers	6	(2)
1928–1929	→ East Stirlingshire (loan)	17	(6)
1929–1934	Liverpool	130	(18)
1934–1937	Sheffield United	68	(1)
1937–1938	Falkirk	42	(2)
1938–1939	East Fife	9	(0)
1939–1940	Dundee United	0	(0)

Managerial career
- 1959–1969: Alloa Athletic
- * Club domestic league appearances and goals

Archibald Johnston McPherson (10 February 1909 – 1969) was a Scottish footballer who played as an inside left or left half, with his longest spell being with Liverpool. He was later a manager, in charge of Alloa Athletic for a decade.

== Career ==
McPherson, known as 'Curly', began his professional career with Rangers before moving south of the border to join Liverpool in late 1929 after 18 months at Ibrox, in which he was loaned to East Stirlingshire then had a role as back-up to Bob McPhail, deciding to leave as he was unlikely to displace the Scottish international despite impressing when he did fill in while McPhail was injured. He was to be a regular in Liverpool's first-team for the next five years, playing as an inside-left and forming a partnership with Fred Hopkin.

Described as a skilful player and an accurate passer, in December 1934 he moved on to Sheffield United, where he was employed as a wing-half. He featured on the losing side in the 1936 FA Cup Final, before returning to Scotland to spend one year at Falkirk then short spells at East Fife and Dundee United up to the outbreak of World War II, after which he retired. He later managed Alloa Athletic for ten years, until a short time before his death in 1969.

He also played cricket, as a batsman, for Clackmannan County in the Scottish Counties Championship.

== Honours ==
=== As a player ===
Rangers

- Glasgow Cup: 1929–30

Sheffield United

- FA Cup runner-up: 1935–36

=== As a manager ===
Alloa Athletic

- Stirlingshire Cup: 1959–60, 1965–66
