= Tommy Lucas =

English footballer

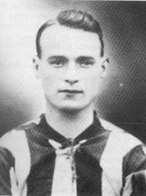
Tommy Lucas (1916)

Thomas Lucas (22 September 1895 – 5 December 1953 (aged 58)) was an English footballer who played for Liverpool and the England national team. He subsequently played for Kent League Ashford United.
