= Robert Done =

English footballer

Personal information
- Date of birth: 27 April 1904
- Place of birth: Runcorn, England
- Date of death: 6 September 1982 (aged 78)
- Place of death: Chester, England
- Height: 5 ft 10 in (1.78 m)
- Position: Full back

Senior career*
Years	Team	Apps	(Gls)
1922–1926	Runcorn		
1926–1935	Liverpool	147	(13)
1935–1937	Reading	13	(1)
1937–1938	Chester	37	(0)
1938	Accrington Stanley	6	(0)
1938–1939	Bangor City		
- * Club domestic league appearances and goals

Robert Done (27 April 1904 – 6 September 1982) was an English footballer who played in the Football League for Liverpool, Reading, Chester and Accrington Stanley.

== Life and playing career ==
Born in Runcorn, Cheshire, Done played for Runcorn before Liverpool manager Matt McQueen brought him to Anfield in April 1926. He made his debut, along with George Pither, on New Year's Day 1927 in a Football League First Division match at Burnden Park in a 2–1 defeat to Bolton Wanderers. His first goal came some 18 months later in the 6–3 victory over Leicester City on 8 August 1928; it was the second goal and it came in the 31st minute. All six goals were scored by different players.

Done's debut was one of just two appearances in his first season at Liverpool and he followed up with four more games during the next campaign. In 1928–29, Done finally got his chance; he played in all but five matches over the course of the season, and scored five goals.

Tommy Lucas, James Jackson and Done were fighting it out for the same spot with the latter gaining the upper hand for the first 12 matches of the season of 1929–30, but he was replaced by Lucas for the rest of the season. Done won his place back at the beginning of the next campaign and remained in the starting line-up on a more frequent basis for the next three seasons.

Done's final outing for Liverpool came on 17 November 1934 in a repeat of the match in which he scored his first goal, against Leicester at Anfield. This time, Liverpool won by five goals to one and Gordon Hodgson scored a hat-trick.

After nine years as a Red, Done left for Reading in May 1935. He also went on to represent both Chester, Accrington Stanley and Bangor City before he retired.

== Career details ==
- Liverpool (1926–1935): 155 appearances, 13 goals
