= Tom Morrison (footballer) =

Scottish footballer (1904–1973)

Personal information
- Full name: Thomas Kelly Morrison
- Date of birth: 21 January 1904
- Place of birth: Coylton, Scotland
- Date of death: 1973 (aged 68–69)
- Position: Right half

Senior career*
Years	Team	Apps	(Gls)
1921–1924	Troon Athletic		
1924–1928	St Mirren	132	(11)
1928–1935	Liverpool	240	(4)
1935–1936	Sunderland	21	(0)
1936	Gamlingay United		
1937	Ayr United	0	(0)
1938–1939	Drumcondra		
Total		393	(15)

International career
1927	Scotland	1	(0)
- * Club domestic league appearances and goals

Thomas Kelly Morrison (21 January 1904 – 1973) was a Scottish footballer who played as a right half for St Mirren, Liverpool and Sunderland, and for the Scotland national team.

== Club career ==
Morrison was born in Coylton, Ayrshire. He played for Troon Athletic and St Mirren. During his time in Paisley he was almost ever-present and won the Scottish Cup in 1926.

He was signed by Liverpool manager Matt McQueen in February 1928 for £4000 and made his debut on 11 February 1928 at Fratton Park in a Football League First Division match against Portsmouth, which ended with Portsmouth beating the Reds 1–0. His first goal came almost two years later on 13 December 1930 when he scored a first-minute goal at Highbury in a 1–1 draw with Arsenal. He was quoted in a 1929 newspaper article explaining in some detail his philosophy on the role of half-backs in football, and in a 1931 article he praised the captaincy qualities of Anfield teammate James Jackson – by this time Morrison was Jackson's deputy in the role. As at St Mirren, he was a near-constant presence in the Liverpool team between his arrival and summer 1934.

However, the good discipline Morrison had displayed then waned dramatically; the club suspended him for unspecified reasons in August 1934 and his return to the team was then curtailed by appendicitis which required an immediate operation in November of that year, with Ted Savage taking over the position. Morrison then disappeared altogether in February 1935, failing to report for a reserve team match which led the club to issue repeated suspensions in his absence. He eventually returned, but did not play another first team match for Liverpool.

He moved to Sunderland in November 1935, and the Black Cats went on to capture the English league title in 1936 with Morrison contributing 21 appearances. At the end of the season he vanished once again, leaving his wife and child behind in Sunderland with no source of income. It transpired that he had been working as a fruit picker in Cambridgeshire and playing for Gamlingay United in the local amateur league under the pseudonym of 'Jack Anderson'. He was arrested in December 1936 and appeared in court in Sunderland accused of leaving his wife and child chargeable to the public assistance committee, with the judge agreeing to dismiss the case when the relief funds paid to Mrs Morrison were refunded along with costs.

Morrison went on to sign for Ayr United in summer 1937, but before playing a match for them he was charged with housebreaking, having broken into an unoccupied Ayrshire cottage following a bout of drinking with friends, living there for some time and eventually selling off the contents. His registration was cancelled by Ayr United and he moved to Ireland to play for Drumcondra, where his career was ended in March 1939 by a badly broken leg for which he received a compensation payment at court some months later. He worked as a coach in Ireland, and continued this back in England after World War II also working at the Greene King brewery in Biggleswade.

== International career ==
Morrison gained one cap for Scotland whilst he was with St Mirren; he played in a British Championship fixture against England at Hampden Park on 2 April 1927, watched by a crowd of 111,214. Scotland lost the match 2–1. He was also a member of a Scottish Football Association squad which toured North America in the summer of that year, but the dozen matches he took part in did not include any official internationals.
