= Jimmy McDougall (footballer) =

Scottish footballer (1904–1984)

Personal information
- Full name: James McDougall
- Date of birth: 23 January 1904
- Place of birth: Port Glasgow, Scotland
- Date of death: 3 July 1984 (aged 80)
- Place of death: Liverpool, England
- Positions: Left half; inside left

Senior career*
Years	Team	Apps	(Gls)
–	Port Glasgow Athletic Juniors		
1925–1928	Partick Thistle	59	(21)
1928–1938	Liverpool	338	(12)
1938–1939	South Liverpool		
Total		397	(33)

International career
1931	Scotland	2	(0)
- * Club domestic league appearances and goals

James McDougall (23 January 1904 – July 1984) was a Scottish footballer who played as an inside left or left half for Partick Thistle, Liverpool and Scotland.

== Career ==
=== Club ===
Born in Port Glasgow, McDougall played for Port Glasgow Athletic Juniors and Partick Thistle before George Patterson signed him for Liverpool in April 1928. McDougall made his Liverpool debut on 25 August 1928, in a 3–0 First Division win against Bury at Anfield. He scored his first goal in a match against Aston Villa at Villa Park, this turned out to be a consolation goal as Villa won 3–1.

McDougall was originally signed as a forward, where he played in Scotland, but was moved back into a half-back role a short time after signing for the Reds. He became a regular member of the side for the next decade, averaging 35 matches per season. This was during a time when Liverpool were not amongst the title challengers (5th place in his first season was the highest the club reached) or stringing together a cup run (the best run they achieved was a quarter final appearance in 1932 which Chelsea won 2–0).

McDougall stayed on Merseyside after playing his last game for Liverpool on 15 January 1938, in a 3–0 defeat to Charlton Athletic at The Valley. He amassed 356 appearances, scoring 12 times. Four of the goals came after he was moved back to half-back, where he played 313 times. Before he finally hung his boots up he turned out for local side South Liverpool, thereafter coaching their youth team.

=== International ===
Scotland called up McDougall for a European tour in 1931, leaving most of their established players at home. He made his international debut in a friendly match at the Hohe Warte Stadium, Vienna against Austria on 16 May, as the Scots were resoundingly beaten 5–0. He was given the honour of captaining his country in his second international, which was also to be his last. Four days later the Scots lost 3–0 in the Stadio Nazionale, Rome against Italy.

== Personal life ==
His elder brother Jock McDougall was also a footballer who played for Airdrieonians and Sunderland, and appeared once for Scotland.

== See also ==
- List of Scotland national football team captains
- List of Scottish football families
