= Arthur Riley =

South African soccer player

Personal information
- Date of birth: 26 December 1903
- Place of birth: Boksburg, Transvaal, Union of South Africa
- Date of death: July 1984 (aged 80)
- Position(s): Goalkeeper

Senior career*
Years	Team	Apps	(Gls)
- Transvaal
1925–39	Liverpool	338	(0)
- *Club domestic league appearances and goals

Arthur Riley (26 December 1903 – July 1984) was a South African international footballer who also played football for Liverpool.

== Life and playing career ==
On 26 November 1939, Riley played in goal as part of an All-British XI versus a Football League XI, in the Red Cross Fund International. The All-British XI lost the match 3–2.

Riley died in July 1984 in Cape Town, South Africa. However some sources claim he died in St Helens, Merseyside.

== Career details ==
- Liverpool F.C (1925–1940) – 338 appearances
