= George Patterson (football manager) =

English football manager (1887–1955)

George Stanley Patterson (1887 – 1955) was an English football manager and secretary who was involved with Liverpool for much of the first half of the 20th century. After a playing career spent mostly with Marine F.C., Patterson joined Liverpool in 1908 as assistant to Tom Watson. After a spell as club secretary, he replaced Matt McQueen as manager in 1928. However, he was not successful and resigned in 1936 citing ill health. He continued on as club secretary.

Patterson was born in Liverpool, Lancashire in England in 1887. He died on 8 May 1955 in Skerries Road, Liverpool.
