= 1899–1900 Newcastle United F.C. season =

Newcastle United
1899–1900 season
- Manager: Selection committee (overseen by Frank Watt)
- Stadium: St James' Park
- Football League First Division: 5th
- FA Cup: Second Round
- Top goalscorer: League: Jack Peddie (15); All: Jack Peddie (16)
- Highest home attendance: 30,000 (vs. Sheffield United)
- Lowest home attendance: 6,000 (vs. Glossop)
- Average home league attendance: 15,818
Home colours	Away colours

The 1899–1900 season was Newcastle United's second season in the Football League First Division, the top flight of English football at the time. Newcastle finished the season in 5th place.

== Appearances and goals ==
Pos.	Name	League		FA Cup		Total	
Pos.	Name	Apps	Goals	Apps	Goals	Apps	Goals
GK	(England) Matt Kingsley	34	0	1	0	35	0
GK	(England) Charlie Watts	0	0	1	0	1	0
DF	(England) Jack Carr	21	1	2	0	23	1
DF	(Scotland) Dave Gardner	34	1	1	0	35	1
DF	(England) Billy Lindsay	23	0	0	0	23	0
DF	(England) Jimmy Lindsay	2	0	0	0	2	0
MF	(Scotland) Andy Aitken	34	0	2	0	36	0
MF	(England) Ted Birnie	7	0	1	0	8	0
MF	(Scotland) Alex Gardner	19	6	2	0	21	6
MF	(Scotland) Tommy Ghee	29	1	2	0	31	1
MF	(England) Willie Higgins	18	1	2	0	20	1
MF	(Scotland) Jack Ostler	1	0	0	0	1	0
MF	(England) Colin Veitch	1	0	0	0	1	0
FW	(Scotland) John Fraser	30	8	2	0	32	8
FW	(England) Sandy MacFarlane	31	5	1	0	32	5
FW	(England) Barney Mole	1	1	0	0	1	1
FW	(Scotland) Tom Niblo	11	2	0	0	11	2
FW	(Scotland) Jack Peddie	27	15	2	1	29	16
FW	(England) Joe Rogers	24	2	1	1	25	3
FW	(Scotland) Jimmy Stevenson	9	5	2	1	11	6
FW	(Scotland) Willie Wardrope	18	4	0	0	18	4

== Competitions ==
Win Draw Loss Void

=== League ===
Round	1	2	3	4	5	6	7	8	9	10	11	12	13	14	15	16	17		18	19	20	21	22	23	24	25	26	27	28	29	30	31	32	33	34
Result	1–1	2–0	3–2	2–0	1–2	6–0	0–1	0–0	0–1	1–2	1–1	3–1	0–0	0–1	2–2	2–4	4–2	2–3	2–3	4–1	1–2	2–1	1–1	3–2	1–0	0–2	2–0	1–3	1–4	3–1	0–0	0–0	0–0	2–2	2–1
Position	9th	3rd	4th	3rd	6th	4th	4th	5th	5th	7th	9th	5th	5th	8th	9th	10th	9th		11th	10th	11th	10th	10th	9th	7th	7th	6th	6th	6th	7th	6th	6th	6th	6th	5th

=== FA Cup ===
Match	1		2
Result	2–1	0–0	1–4

=== Friendlies ===
Match	1	2	3	4	5
Result	6–3	2–2	4–1	1–1	5–1

== Matches ==
=== League ===
2 September 1899	West Bromwich Albion	1–1	Newcastle United	West Bromwich
	Goal	(Report)	Peddie (pen.)	Stadium: Stoney Lane; Attendance: 4,000

9 September 1899	Newcastle United	2–0	Everton	Newcastle upon Tyne
	Peddie; Niblo	(Report)		Stadium: St James' Park; Attendance: 25,000

16 September 1899	Blackburn Rovers	2–3	Newcastle United	Blackburn
	Goal	(Report)	Fraser; Peddie; Wardrope	Stadium: Ewood Park; Attendance: 8,000

23 September 1899	Newcastle United	2–0	Derby County	Newcastle upon Tyne
	Peddie; Wardrope	(Report)		Stadium: St James' Park; Attendance: 19,000

30 September 1899	Bury	2–1	Newcastle United	Bury
	Goal	(Report)	Niblo	Stadium: Gigg Lane; Attendance: 5,000

7 October 1899	Newcastle United	6–0	Notts County	Newcastle upon Tyne
	Fraser; MacFarlane; Peddie; Stevenson; Wardrope	(Report)		Stadium: St James' Park; Attendance: 20,000

14 October 1899	Manchester City	1–0	Newcastle United	Manchester
	Ross	(Report)		Stadium: Hyde Road; Attendance: 25,000

21 October 1899	Newcastle United	0–0	Sheffield United	Newcastle upon Tyne
		(Report)		Stadium: St James' Park; Attendance: 30,000

28 October 1899	Newcastle United	0–1	Wolverhampton Wanderers	Newcastle upon Tyne
		(Report)	Goal	Stadium: St James' Park; Attendance: 20,000

4 November 1899	Aston Villa	2–1	Newcastle United	Birmingham
	Goal	(Report)	Ghee	Stadium: Villa Park; Attendance: 18,000

11 November 1899	Newcastle United	1–1	Liverpool	Newcastle upon Tyne
	MacFarlane	(Report)	Goal	Stadium: St James' Park; Attendance: 8,000

18 November 1899	Burnley	1–3	Newcastle United	Burnley
	Goal	(Report)	Fraser; Wardrope; Rogers	Stadium: Turf Moor; Attendance: 5,000

25 November 1899	Newcastle United	0–0	Preston North End	Newcastle upon Tyne
		(Report)		Stadium: St James' Park; Attendance: 15,000

2 December 1899	Nottingham Forest	1–0	Newcastle United	Nottingham
	Goal	(Report)		Stadium: City Ground; Attendance: 9,000

16 December 1899	Stoke	2–2	Newcastle United	Stoke-on-Trent
	Turner; Higginson	(Report)	A. Gardner; Higgins	Stadium: Victoria Ground; Attendance: 3,000

23 December 1899	Newcastle United	2–4	Sunderland	Newcastle upon Tyne
	MacFarlane; A. Gardner	(Report)	Hogg; McLatchie	Stadium: St James' Park; Attendance: 19,129

30 December 1899	Newcastle United	4–2	West Bromwich Albion	Newcastle upon Tyne
	Fraser; Peddie; Stevenson	(Report)	Goal	Stadium: St James' Park; Attendance: 12,000

1 January 1900	Newcastle United	2–3	Glossop	Newcastle upon Tyne
	MacFarlane; Peddie		Goal	Stadium: St James' Park; Attendance: 1,500

6 January 1900	Everton	3–2	Newcastle United	Liverpool
	Settle; Proudfoot	(Report)	Peddie; Fraser	Stadium: Goodison Park; Attendance: 3,000

13 January 1900	Newcastle United	4–1	Blackburn Rovers	Newcastle upon Tyne
	MacFarlane; Peddie; Carr	(Report)	Goal	Stadium: St James' Park; Attendance: 11,000

20 January 1900	Derby County	2–1	Newcastle United	Derby
	Goal	(Report)	Stevenson	Stadium: Baseball Ground; Attendance: 10,000

3 February 1900	Newcastle United	2–1	Bury	Newcastle upon Tyne
	Darroch (o.g.); Stevenson	(Report)	Sagar	Stadium: St James' Park; Attendance: 10,000

3 March 1900	Wolverhampton Wanderers	1–1	Newcastle United	Wolverhampton
	Goal	(Report)	Peddie	Stadium: Molineux Stadium; Attendance: 8,000

10 March 1900	Newcastle United	3–2	Aston Villa	Newcastle upon Tyne
	Peddie; A. Gardner	(Report)	Goal	Stadium: St James' Park; Attendance: 19,549

14 March 1900	Newcastle United	1–0	Glossop	Newcastle upon Tyne
	Peddie	(Report)		Stadium: St James' Park; Attendance: 6,000

17 March 1900	Liverpool	2–0	Newcastle United	Liverpool
	Robertson; Walker	(Report)		Stadium: Anfield; Attendance: 18,000

24 March 1900	Newcastle United	2–0	Burnley	Newcastle upon Tyne
	Fraser; Rogers	(Report)		Stadium: St James' Park; Attendance: 12,000

26 March 1900	Sheffield United	3–1	Newcastle United	Sheffield
	Goal	(Report)	A. Gardner	Stadium: Bramall Lane; Attendance: 3,000

31 March 1900	Preston North End	4–1	Newcastle United	Preston
	Goal	(Report)	Mole	Stadium: Deepdale; Attendance: 4,000

7 April 1900	Newcastle United	3–1	Nottingham Forest	Newcastle upon Tyne
	MacFarlane; Peddie; D. Gardner (pen.)	(Report)	Goal	Stadium: St James' Park; Attendance: 14,224

13 April 1900	Newcastle United	0–0	Manchester City	Newcastle upon Tyne
		(Report)		Stadium: St James' Park; Attendance: 16,000

14 April 1900	Glossop	0–0	Newcastle United	Glossop
		(Report)		Stadium: North Road; Attendance: 2,000

16 April 1900	Notts County	0–0	Newcastle United	West Bridgford
		(Report)		Stadium: Trent Bridge; Attendance: 10,000

21 April 1900	Newcastle United	2–2	Stoke	Newcastle upon Tyne
	Peddie; A. Gardner	(Report)	Jones	Stadium: St James' Park; Attendance: 12,000

28 April 1900	Sunderland	1–2	Newcastle United	Sunderland
	Fulton	(Report)	Fraser; A. Gardner (pen.)	Stadium: Roker Park; Attendance: 22,000

- The match against Glossop on 1 January was abandoned and replayed on 14 March.

=== FA Cup ===
27 January 1900 Round 1	Newcastle United	2–1	Reading	Newcastle upon Tyne
	Stevenson; Rogers	(Report)	Barlow	Stadium: St James' Park; Attendance: 11,259

10 February 1900 Round 2	Southampton	0–0	Newcastle United	Southampton
				Stadium: The Dell; Attendance: 10,000

17 February 1900 Round 2	Southampton	1–4	Newcastle United	Southampton
	McLeod; Turner; Yates	(Report)	Peddie	Stadium: The Dell; Attendance: 8,000

- The match against Southampton on 10 February was abandoned after 55 minutes due to a heavy snowstorm.

=== Friendlies ===
5 September 1899	Newcastle United	6–3	Kaffirs	Newcastle upon Tyne
	Ghee; Wardrope; Stevenson; Niblo (o.g.)		Goal	Stadium: St James' Park; Attendance: 6,000

9 December 1899	Newcastle United	2–2	Dundee	Newcastle upon Tyne
	Peddie; Stevenson		Goal	Stadium: St James' Park; Attendance: 2,000

25 December 1899	Newcastle United	4–1	Kilmarnock	Newcastle upon Tyne
	Fraser; Rogers; Wardrope		Goal	Stadium: St James' Park; Attendance: 2,500

26 December 1899	Newcastle United	1–1	Third Lanark	Newcastle upon Tyne
	Peddie		Goal	Stadium: St James' Park; Attendance: 2,500

17 April 1900	Coventry City	1–5	Newcastle United	Coventry
	Goal		Peddie; Rogers; Kingsley (pen.)	Stadium: Highfield Road; Attendance: 1,000
