= 1893–94 Liverpool F.C. season =

English football club season

Liverpool
1893–94 season
- Manager: William Barclay & John McKenna
- Second Division: 1st (promoted)
- FA Cup: Third round
- Top goalscorer: James Stott (14)
Home colours	Away colours

The 1893–94 season was the second season in Liverpool F.C.'s existence, and was their first year in The Football League, in which they competed in the Second Division. The season covers the period from 1 July 1893 to 30 June 1894.

The club's first match in the Football League was against Middlesbrough Ironopolis on 2 September 1893. Liverpool won 2–0, Malcolm McVean scoring their first goal in league football. Their first season in the Football League was a success. Liverpool finished the season unbeaten in 28 matches, 22 of which they won. Their success meant they finished top of the Second Division, but as there was no automatic promotion to the First Division, they were entered into the 'Test Match system'. Victory over Newton Heath in the test match secured promotion to the First Division.

== Squad statistics ==
One of the players, James Henderson from Scotland, was born in 1870 and played one match as a striker for Liverpool, after he was signed from a Scottish club named Annbank.

=== Appearances and goals ===
No.	Pos	Nat	Player	Total		Division 2		FA Cup		Test Match	
No.	Pos	Nat	Player	Apps	Goals	Apps	Goals	Apps	Goals	Apps	Goals
	MF	(England) ENG	Harry Bradshaw	18	11	14	8	3	2	1	1
	FW	(England) ENG	Gerard Dewhurst	1	0	1	0	0	0	0	0
	FW	(Scotland) SCO	Douglas Dick	11	2	11	2	0	0	0	0
	FW	(Scotland) SCO	John Givens	5	3	5	3	0	0	0	0
	MF	(Scotland) SCO	Patrick Gordon	25	7	21	6	3	0	1	1
	DF	(Scotland) SCO	Andrew Hannah	28	1	24	1	3	0	1	0
	FW	(Scotland) SCO	Davy Henderson	23	12	20	10	2	2	1	0
	MF	(Scotland) SCO	James Henderson	1	0	1	0	0	0	0	0
	DF	(Wales) WAL	Abel Hughes	1	0	1	0	0	0	0	0
	MF	(Scotland) SCO	Jim McBride	28	3	25	3	2	0	1	0
	MF	(Scotland) SCO	John McCartney	18	1	16	1	1	0	1	0
	DF	(Scotland) SCO	Duncan McLean	32	5	28	5	3	0	1	0
	GK	(England) ENG	Billy McOwen	26	0	23	0	3	0	0	0
	DF	(Scotland) SCO	Joe McQue	30	3	26	2	3	1	1	0
	FW	(Scotland) SCO	Hugh McQueen	30	10	27	10	2	0	1	0
	GK	(Scotland) SCO	Matt McQueen	26	1	22	1	3	0	1	0
	MF	(Scotland) SCO	Malcolm McVean	26	10	22	9	3	1	1	0
	MF	(England) ENG	Jimmy Stott	17	14	15	14	2	0	0	0
	FW	(England) ENG	Albert Worgan	1	2	1	2	0	0	0	0

== Friendlies ==
6 September 1893 Friendly	Liverpool	1–0	Newton Heath	Liverpool
	McQueen	Report		Stadium: Anfield; Attendance: 2,000

20 September 1893 Friendly	Newton Heath	0–3	Liverpool	Clayton
		Report	Gordon; McQueen; McVean	Stadium: Bank Street; Attendance: 1,000

3 October 1893 Friendly	Darwen	1–3	Liverpool	Darwen
	Goal	Report	McCartney; McQueen	Stadium: Barley Bank; Attendance: 1,000

16 October 1893 Friendly	Preston North End	3–0	Liverpool	Preston
	Goal	Report		Stadium: Deepdale; Attendance: 1,000

16 December 1893 Friendly	Nottingham Forest	0–3	Liverpool	Nottingham
		Report	Gordon; Bradshaw; McVean	Stadium: Town Ground; Attendance: 5,000

23 December 1893 Friendly	Ardwick	2–6	Liverpool	Manchester
	Bennett; Whittle	Report	McBride; McVean; Stott	Stadium: Hyde Road; Attendance: 3,000

25 December 1893 Friendly	Accrington Stanley	1–0	Liverpool	Accrington
	Goal	Report		Stadium: Crown Ground; Attendance: 1,200
Note: Abandoned after 25 minutes due to bad weather.

26 December 1893 Friendly	Liverpool	2–0	Corinthians	Liverpool
	Henderson 10', 70'	Report		Stadium: Anfield; Attendance: 5,000

1 March 1894 Friendly	Liverpool	3–0	Newton Heath	Liverpool
	Bradshaw; Dick; Worgan	Report		Stadium: Anfield; Attendance: 2,000

4 April 1894 Friendly	Liverpool	4–2	Darwen	Liverpool
	Stott 8'; Gordon; Worgan	Report	Goal	Stadium: Anfield; Attendance: Unknown

== Testimonials ==
8 January 1894 William McGregor	Liverpool	2–0	Burnley	Liverpool
	Gordon; Henderson	Report		Stadium: Anfield; Attendance: 300

26 March 1894 Andrew Hannah	Liverpool	8–0	Accrington Stanley	Liverpool
	Bradshaw; Givens; McQueen; McVean	Report		Stadium: Anfield; Attendance: 5,000

2 April 1894 Billy Stewart	Newton Heath	2–0	Liverpool	Clayton
	Goal	Report		Stadium: Bank Street; Attendance: 2,000

23 April 1894 Billy Betts	The Wednesday	4–0	Liverpool	Sheffield
	Goal	Report		Stadium: Olive Grove; Attendance: 3,000

== Competitions ==
=== League Division Two ===
==== League Table ====
Pos	Team	Pld	W	D	L	GF	GA	GAv	Pts	Qualification or relegation
1	Liverpool (C, O, P)	28	22	6	0	77	18	4.278	50	Qualification for test matches
2	Small Heath (O, P)	28	21	0	7	103	44	2.341	42	Qualification for test matches
3	Notts County	28	18	3	7	70	31	2.258	39	Qualification for test matches
4	Newcastle United	28	15	6	7	66	39	1.692	36	
5	Grimsby Town	28	15	2	11	71	58	1.224	32	

Rules for classification: 1) Points; 2) Goal average; 3) Goals scored
(C) Champions; (O) Play-off winners; (P) Promoted

==== Matches ====
Win Draw Loss

2 September 1893 1	Middlesbrough Ironopolis	0–2	Liverpool	Middlesbrough
		Report	McQue; McVean	Stadium: Paradise Ground; Attendance: 1,500

9 September 1893 2	Liverpool	4–0	Lincoln City	Liverpool
	McBride 16', 18'; Gordon 44'; McVean 80'	Report		Stadium: Anfield; Attendance: 5,000

16 September 1893 3	Ardwick	0–1	Liverpool	Manchester
		Report	Stott 80 '	Stadium: Hyde Road; Attendance: 4,000

23 September 1893 4	Liverpool	3–1	Small Heath	Liverpool
	Henderson 41 ' Stott	Report	Jenkyns	Stadium: Anfield; Attendance: 8,000

30 September 1893 5	Notts County	1–1	Liverpool	Nottingham
	Watson	Report	McQueen 70 '	Stadium: Trent Bridge; Attendance: 4,000

7 October 1893 6	Liverpool	6–0	Middlesbrough Ironopolis	Liverpool
	McLean 5 ' Stott 10', 15', 70 ' Henderson 40 ' McQueen 85 '	Report		Stadium: Anfield

14 October 1893 7	Small Heath	3–4	Liverpool	Birmingham
	Jenkyns (red card) 55'; Hands; Wheldon	Report	Gordon 1 ' Stott 2 ' Henderson 35 ' McQueen 88 '	Stadium: Muntz Street; Attendance: 5,000

21 October 1893 8	Burton Swifts	1–1	Liverpool	Burton upon Trent
	Munro	Report	McVean 44 '	Stadium: Peel Croft; Attendance: 3,000

28 October 1893 9	Woolwich Arsenal	0–5	Liverpool	London
		Report	McQueen; Stott; McCartney; Bradshaw; McLean	Stadium: Manor Ground; Attendance: 10,000

4 November 1893 10	Liverpool	5–1	Newcastle United	Liverpool
	Stott 9 ' Dick; Bradshaw; Gordon	Report	Thompson	Stadium: Anfield; Attendance: 5,000

11 November 1893 11	Walsall Town Swifts	1–1	Liverpool	Walsall
	S. Cox	Report	Bradshaw 30 '	Stadium: West Bromwich Road; Attendance: 5,000

18 November 1893 12	Liverpool	2–1	Notts County	Liverpool
	Gordon 3 ' Henderson 38 '	Report	Bruce 30 '	Stadium: Anfield; Attendance: 6,000

25 November 1893 13	Newcastle United	0–0	Liverpool	Newcastle upon Tyne
		Report		Stadium: St James' Park; Attendance: 3,000

2 December 1893 14	Liverpool	3–0	Ardwick	Liverpool
	Stott 35 ' McQueen 75 ' Henderson 85 '	Report		Stadium: Anfield; Attendance: 4,000

9 December 1893 15	Liverpool	3–0	Walsall Town Swifts	Liverpool
	McVean 1', 7', 80 '	Report		Stadium: Anfield; Attendance: 5,000

28 December 1893 16	Crewe Alexandra	0–5	Liverpool	Crewe
		Report	Gordon; McVean; McQueen; Henderson; Bradshaw	Stadium: Alexandra Recreation Ground; Attendance: 4,000

30 December 1893 17	Liverpool	2–0	Grimsby Town	Liverpool
	Bradshaw 5 ' Henderson 10 '	Report		Stadium: Anfield; Attendance: 3,000

1 January 1894 18	Liverpool	2–0	Woolwich Arsenal	Liverpool
	McBride; McVean	Report		Stadium: Anfield; Attendance: 5,000; Referee: A. Scragg

6 January 1894 19	Rotherham Town	1–4	Liverpool	Rotherham
	Fred Turner	Report	Henderson; McQueen; Stott	Stadium: Clifton Grove; Attendance: 500; Referee: C. Gilbert

13 January 1894 20	Liverpool	5–1	Rotherham Town	Liverpool
	Henderson 5', 51 ' Bradshaw 35', 85'; McQueen 50 '	Report	Fred Turner	Stadium: Anfield; Attendance: 4,000; Referee: T. Helme

3 February 1894 21	Liverpool	4–0	Northwich Victoria	Liverpool
	McLean (pen.); Stott; Bradshaw	Report		Stadium: Anfield; Attendance: 4,000

3 March 1894 22	Liverpool	3–1	Burton Swifts	Liverpool
	McLean 50' (pen.); Worgan 65', 70'	Report	Ekins	Stadium: Anfield; Attendance: 8,000

17 March 1894 23	Lincoln City	1–1	Liverpool	Lincoln
	Flewitt 34 '	Report	Givens 70 '	Stadium: John O'Gaunts; Attendance: 4,000

24 March 1894 24	Liverpool	2–0	Crewe Alexandra	Liverpool
	McQueen; Dick	Report		Stadium: Anfield; Attendance: 3,000

28 March 1894 25	Northwich Victoria	2–3	Liverpool	Northwich
	Drinkwater; Finnerhan	Report	McLean 70 ' McQueen; Givens	Stadium: Drill Field; Attendance: 3,000

31 March 1894 26	Grimsby Town	0–1	Liverpool	Cleethorpes
		Report	Givens 85 '	Stadium: Blundell Park; Attendance: 5,000

7 April 1894 27	Burslem Port Vale	2–2	Liverpool	Stoke-on-Trent
	Dean; Wood	Report	McVean 75 ' McQueen 88 '	Stadium: Athletic Ground; Attendance: 5,000

14 April 1894 28	Liverpool	2–1	Burslem Port Vale	Liverpool
	Hannah; McQue	Report	Edwards	Stadium: Anfield; Attendance: 5,000

28 April 1894 Test Match	Liverpool	2–0	Newton Heath	Blackburn
	Gordon 20'; Bradshaw 30'	Report		Stadium: Ewood Park; Attendance: 5,000

=== F.A. Cup ===
27 January 1894 1	Liverpool	3–0	Grimsby Town	Liverpool
	Bradshaw 35', 80'; McQue 40'	Report		Stadium: Anfield; Attendance: 8,000; Referee: S.W. Widdowson

10 February 1894 2	Liverpool	3–2	Preston North End	Liverpool
	Henderson 4', 80'; McVean 40'	Report	Becton 42', 70'	Stadium: Anfield; Attendance: 18,000

24 February 1894 3	Bolton Wanderers	3–0	Liverpool	Bolton
	Dickenson 6', 31'; Cassidy 70'	Report		Stadium: Pike's Lane; Attendance: 20,000

=== Lancashire Senior Cup ===
20 January 1894 1	Blackburn Rovers	4–3	Liverpool	Blackburn
	Goal	Report	Henderson; McQueen; Bradshaw	Stadium: Ewood Park; Attendance: 8,000

=== Liverpool Senior Cup ===
20 March 1894 QF	Liverpool	4–1	Bootle Athletic	Liverpool
	Bradshaw; Henderson; Dick; McVean	Report	Goal	Stadium: Anfield; Attendance: 500

9 April 1894 SF	Liverpool	2–1	White Star Wanderers	Seaview Ground (home of Bootle Athletic F.C.)
				Attendance: 200

30 April 1894 F	Liverpool	0–3	Everton
		Report	Goal

=== Palatine League ===
10 March 1894	Liverpool	2–0	Preston North End	Liverpool
	Givens; McVean	Report		Stadium: Anfield; Attendance: 14,000

12 March 1894	Burnley	4–2	Liverpool	Burnley
	Goal	Report	Bradshaw; McQueen	Stadium: Turf Moor; Attendance: 2,000

23 March 1894	Liverpool	1–1	Darwen	Liverpool
	McQueen	Report	Goal	Stadium: Anfield; Attendance: 10,000
Note: Unknown if the Liverpool scorer was Hugh McQueen or Matt McQueen.

11 April 1894	Liverpool	0–2	Burnley	Liverpool
		Report	Goal	Stadium: Anfield; Attendance: Unknown

12 April 1894	Blackburn Rovers	5–0	Liverpool	Blackburn
	Haydock	Report		Stadium: Ewood Park; Attendance: 10,000

16 April 1894	Preston North End	3–0	Liverpool	Preston
	Goal	Report		Stadium: Deepdale; Attendance: 2,000

21 April 1894	Darwen	8–1	Liverpool	Darwen
	Goal	Report	Worgan	Stadium: Barley Bank; Attendance: 2,000

24 April 1894	Liverpool	1–3	Blackburn Rovers	Liverpool
	Goal	Report	Goal	Stadium: Anfield; Attendance: Unknown
