= 1898–99 Newcastle United F.C. season =

Newcastle United
1898–99 season
- Manager: Selection committee (overseen by Frank Watt)
- Stadium: St James' Park
- Football League First Division: 13th
- FA Cup: Second round
- Top goalscorer: League: Jack Peddie (18); All: Jack Peddie (20)
- Highest home attendance: 25,000 (vs. Aston Villa)
- Lowest home attendance: 6,000 (vs. Sheffield United)
- Average home league attendance: 16,709
Home colours	Away colours

The 1898–99 season was Newcastle United's first season in the Football League First Division, the top flight of English football at the time. Newcastle finished the season in 13th place.

== Appearances and goals ==
Pos.	Name	League		FA Cup		Total	
Pos.	Name	Apps	Goals	Apps	Goals	Apps	Goals
GK	(England) Matt Kingsley	34	0	2	0	36	0
DF	(Scotland) Jimmy Jackson	31	0	1	0	32	0
DF	(England) Billy Lindsay	29	1	1	0	30	1
DF	(England) Jim Lockley	1	0	0	0	1	0
MF	(Scotland) Andy Aitken	26	4	2	0	28	4
MF	(England) Ted Birnie	8	0	0	0	8	0
MF	(Scotland) Tommy Ghee	32	0	2	0	34	0
MF	(England) Willie Higgins	17	2	2	0	19	2
MF	(Scotland) Jack Ostler	25	0	2	0	27	0
FW	(Scotland) John Campbell	2	0	0	0	2	0
FW	(Scotland) John Harvey	3	1	0	0	3	1
FW	(England) Sandy MacFarlane	21	5	0	0	21	5
FW	(England) Archie Mowatt	1	0	0	0	1	0
FW	(Scotland) Tom Niblo	10	0	0	0	10	0
FW	(Scotland) Jack Peddie	29	18	2	2	31	20
FW	(England) Joe Rogers	27	8	2	0	29	8
FW	(Scotland) Billy Reid	4	1	0	0	4	1
FW	(Scotland) Jimmy Stevenson	24	7	2	0	26	7
FW	(England) James Stott	28	0	2	0	30	0
FW	(Scotland) Billy Smith	5	0	0	0	5	0
FW	(Scotland) Willie Wardrope	24	2	2	0	26	2

== Competitions ==
Win Draw Loss

=== League ===
Round	1	2	3	4	5	6	7	8	9	10	11	12	13	14	15	16	17	18	19	20	21	22	23	24	25	26	27	28	29	30	31	32	33	34
Result	2–4	0–3	1–2	0–0	2–2	1–1	1–2	1–2	1–1	0–1	3–0	0–2	4–1	1–3	3–0	2–4	2–2	3–2	0–1	0–0	2–2	1–3	3–0	4–1	2–0	2–1	0–1	0–0	2–0	0–2	2–3	1–0	3–1	0–1
Position	16th	18th	18th	18th	17th	18th	18th	18th	18th	18th	18th	18th	18th	18th	17th	17th	17th	17th	17th	16th	17th	17th	17th	16th	16th	13th	14th	15th	15th	15th	15th	15th	13th	13th

=== FA Cup ===
Match	1	2
Result	1–0	1–3

=== Friendlies ===
Match	1	2	3	4	5	6	7	8	9	10	11	12	13
Result	1–1	6–2	4–4	2–0	1–4	4–1	4–3	12–2	1–3	2–1	0–2	2–2	4–1

== Matches ==
=== League ===
3 September 1898	Newcastle United	2–4	Wolverhampton Wanderers	Newcastle upon Tyne
	Peddie	(Report)	Goal	Stadium: St James' Park; Attendance: 20,000

10 September 1898	Everton	3–0	Newcastle United	Liverpool
	Clarke; Owen (o.g.)	(Report)		Stadium: Goodison Park; Attendance: 16,000

17 September 1898	Newcastle United	1–2	Notts County	Newcastle upon Tyne
	Aitken	(Report)	Goal	Stadium: St James' Park; Attendance: 18,000

24 September 1898	Stoke City	0–0	Newcastle United	Stoke-on-Trent
		(Report)		Stadium: Victoria Ground; Attendance: 12,000

26 September 1898	Sheffield United	2–2	Newcastle United	Sheffield
	Goal	(Report)	Peddie; Higgins	Stadium: Bramall Lane; Attendance: 4,000

1 October 1898	Newcastle United	1–1	Aston Villa	Newcastle upon Tyne
	Rogers	(Report)	Goal	Stadium: St James' Park; Attendance: 25,000

8 October 1898	Burnley	2–1	Newcastle United	Burnley
	Goal	(Report)	Rogers	Stadium: Turf Moor; Attendance: 6,000

15 October 1898	Newcastle United	1–2	Sheffield United	Newcastle upon Tyne
	Harvey	(Report)	Goal	Stadium: St James' Park; Attendance: 6,000

22 October 1898	Bury	1–1	Newcastle United	Bury
	Goal	(Report)	Rogers	Stadium: Gigg Lane; Attendance: 4,000

29 October 1898	Preston North End	1–0	Newcastle United	Preston
	Goal	(Report)		Stadium: Deepdale; Attendance: 3,000

5 November 1898	Newcastle United	3–0	Liverpool	Newcastle upon Tyne
	Peddie; MacFarlane	(Report)		Stadium: St James' Park; Attendance: 20,000

12 November 1898	Nottingham Forest	2–2	Newcastle United	Nottingham
	Goal	(Report)		Stadium: City Ground; Attendance: 8,000

19 November 1898	Newcastle United	4–0	Bolton Wanderers	Newcastle upon Tyne
	Peddie; MacFarlane; Rogers	(Report)		Stadium: St James' Park; Attendance: 20,000

26 November 1898	Derby County	3–1	Newcastle United	Derby
	Goal	(Report)	Wardrope	Stadium: Baseball Ground; Attendance: 7,000

3 December 1898	Newcastle United	3–0	West Bromwich Albion	Newcastle upon Tyne
	Aitken; Peddie; Rogers	(Report)		Stadium: St James' Park; Attendance: 16,000

10 December 1898	Blackburn Rovers	4–2	Newcastle United	Blackburn
	Goal	(Report)	Stevenson	Stadium: Ewood Park; Attendance: 7,000

17 December 1898	Newcastle United	2–2	Sheffield Wednesday	Newcastle upon Tyne
	MacFarlane; Peddie 90'	(Report)	Wright; Spiksley 30'	Stadium: St James' Park; Attendance: 15,000

24 December 1898	Sunderland	2–3	Newcastle United	Sunderland
	Leslie	(Report)	Wardrope; Peddie	Stadium: Roker Park; Attendance: 25,000

26 December 1898	Aston Villa	1–0	Newcastle United	Birmingham
	Goal	(Report)		Stadium: Villa Park; Attendance: 30,000

31 December 1898	Wolverhampton Wanderers	0–0	Newcastle United	Wolverhampton
		(Report)		Stadium: Molineux Stadium; Attendance: 6,000

7 January 1899	Newcastle United	2–2	Everton	Newcastle upon Tyne
	Aitken; Stevenson	(Report)	Proudfoot	Stadium: St James' Park; Attendance: 15,000

14 January 1899	Notts County	3–1	Newcastle United	Nottingham
	Goal	(Report)	Peddie	Stadium: County Ground; Attendance: 12,000

21 January 1899	Newcastle United	3–0	Stoke City	Newcastle upon Tyne
	Peddie; Rogers	(Report)		Stadium: St James' Park; Attendance: 12,000

4 February 1899	Newcastle United	4–1	Burnley	Newcastle upon Tyne
	Peddie; Rogers; Lindsay	(Report)	Goal	Stadium: St James' Park; Attendance: 20,000

18 February 1899	Newcastle United	2–0	Bury	Newcastle upon Tyne
	Peddie	(Report)		Stadium: St James' Park; Attendance: 16,060

25 February 1899	Newcastle United	2–1	Preston North End	Newcastle upon Tyne
	MacFarlane; Peddie (pen.)	(Report)	Goal	Stadium: St James' Park; Attendance: 15,000

11 March 1899	Newcastle United	0–1	Nottingham Forest	Newcastle upon Tyne
		(Report)	Goal	Stadium: St James' Park; Attendance: 18,000

18 March 1899	Bolton Wanderers	1–0	Newcastle United	Bolton
	Goal	(Report)		Stadium: Burnden Park; Attendance: 5,000

25 March 1899	Newcastle United	2–0	Derby County	Newcastle upon Tyne
	Stevenson; Reid	(Report)		Stadium: St James' Park; Attendance: 14,000

1 April 1899	West Bromwich Albion	2–0	Newcastle United	West Bromwich
	Goal	(Report)		Stadium: The Hawthorns; Attendance: 2,304

3 April 1899	Liverpool	3–2	Newcastle United	Liverpool
	Allan; Cox; Walker	(Report)	Stevenson; Higgins	Stadium: Anfield; Attendance: 12,000

8 April 1899	Newcastle United	1–0	Blackburn Rovers	Newcastle upon Tyne
	MacFarlane	(Report)		Stadium: St James' Park; Attendance: 12,000

15 April 1899	Sheffield Wednesday	1–3	Newcastle United	Sheffield
	Hutton 5'	(Report)	Stevenson; Aitken	Stadium: Olive Grove; Attendance: 4,000

22 April 1899	Newcastle United	0–1	Sunderland	Newcastle upon Tyne
		(Report)	McLatchie	Stadium: St James' Park; Attendance: 22,000

=== FA Cup ===
28 January 1899 Round 1	Glossop	0–1	Newcastle United	Glossop
		(Report)	Peddie	Stadium: North Road; Attendance: 7,000

11 February 1899 Round 2	Liverpool	3–1	Newcastle United	Liverpool
	Higgins (o.g.); Morgan; Raisbeck	(Report)	Peddie	Stadium: Anfield; Attendance: 7,000

=== Friendlies ===
1 September 1898	Newcastle United	1–1	Sunderland	Newcastle upon Tyne
	Peddie		Goal	Stadium: St James' Park; Attendance: 15,000

7 September 1898	Newcastle United	6–2	Grimsby Town	Newcastle upon Tyne
	Milne; Niblo; Peddie; Aitken		Goal	Stadium: St James' Park; Attendance: 4,000

15 September 1898	Grimsby Town	4–4	Newcastle United	Grimsby
	Goal		Smith; Birnie; Harvey	Stadium: Abbey Park; Attendance: 4,000

27 December 1898	Coventry City	0–2	Newcastle United	Coventry
			Wardrope; Stevenson	Stadium: Stoke Road; Attendance: 2,000

2 January 1899	Newcastle United	1–4	Burnley	Newcastle upon Tyne
	Stevenson		Goal	Stadium: St James' Park; Attendance: 8,000

3 January 1899	Newcastle United	4–1	Heart of Midlothian	Newcastle upon Tyne
	MacFarlane; Rogers		Goal	Stadium: St James' Park; Attendance: 4,000

14 February 1899	Sunderland	3–4	Newcastle United	Sunderland
	Goal		Peddie; Niblo; Stevenson	Stadium: Roker Park; Attendance: 5,000

2 March 1899	Brampton	2–12	Newcastle United	Brampton
	Goal		Harvey; Stevenson; Ghee; Peddie; Niblo; Higgins; Lindsay; Ostler; Stott; Kingsley; MacFarlane	Attendance: 1,000

4 March 1899	Newcastle United	1–3	Liverpool	Newcastle upon Tyne
	MacFarlane		Goal	Stadium: St James' Park; Attendance: 4,000

31 March 1899	Newcastle United	2–1	Everton	Newcastle upon Tyne
	Rogers; Aitken (pen.)		Goal	Stadium: St James' Park; Attendance: 2,000

17 April 1899	Hibernian	2–0	Newcastle United	Edinburgh
	Goal			Stadium: Easter Road; Attendance: 3,000

24 April 1899	Newcastle United	2–2	Hibernian	Newcastle upon Tyne
	Aitken; MacFarlane		Goal	Stadium: St James' Park; Attendance: 2,000

29 April 1899	Newcastle United	4–1	Derby County	Newcastle upon Tyne
	Aitken; Stevenson; Wardrope; Peddie		Goal	Stadium: St James' Park; Attendance: 2,000
