= 1897–98 Newcastle United F.C. season =

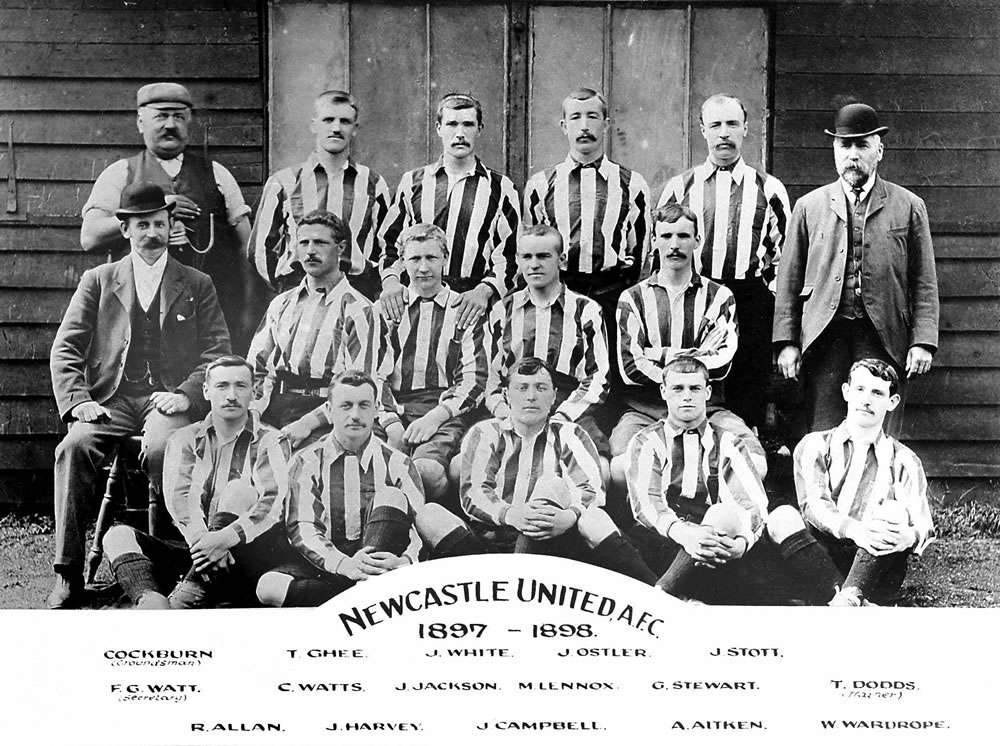
Newcastle United Newcastle United 1897/98
1897–98 season
- Manager: Selection committee (overseen by Frank Watt)
- Stadium: St James' Park
- Football League Second Division: 2nd (Promoted)
- FA Cup: Second round
- Top goalscorer: League: Jack Peddie (16); All: Jack Peddie (18)
- Highest home attendance: 24,959 (vs. Burnley)
- Lowest home attendance: 4,000 (vs. Loughborough & Grimsby Town)
- Average home league attendance: 11,905
Home colours	Away colours

The 1897–98 season was Newcastle United's fifth season in the Football League Second Division. Newcastle finished the season in second place and were promoted to the First Division when the division was expanded from 16 to 18 teams.

== Appearances and goals ==
Pos.	Name	League		FA Cup		Test Matches		Total	
Pos.	Name	Apps	Goals	Apps	Goals	Apps	Goals	Apps	Goals
GK	(England) Charlie Watts	30	0	5	0	4	0	39	0
DF	(Scotland) Jimmy Jackson	27	0	5	2	4	1	36	3
DF	(England) Billy Lindsay	7	0	0	0	2	0	9	0
DF	(England) Jim Lockley	0	0	0	0	2	0	2	0
DF	(Scotland) Thomas Stewart	10	0	2	0	0	0	12	0
DF	(Scotland) John White	20	1	4	0	0	0	24	1
MF	(Scotland) Andy Aitken	23	4	4	4	4	1	31	9
MF	(England) Jack Carr	2	0	0	0	0	0	2	0
MF	(Scotland) Tommy Ghee	28	0	5	1	4	1	37	2
MF	(Scotland) Jack Ostler	26	2	4	0	4	0	34	2
FW	(Scotland) John Allan	1	0	0	0	0	0	1	0
FW	(Scotland) Ronald Allan	24	4	5	0	0	0	29	4
FW	(Scotland) John Campbell	21	9	3	2	3	1	27	12
FW	(Scotland) John Harvey	23	5	5	2	4	2	34	9
FW	(Scotland) Malcolm Lennox	4	1	0	0	0	0	4	1
FW	(England) William Milne	1	0	0	0	0	0	1	0
FW	(Scotland) Tom Niblo	1	0	0	0	0	0	1	0
FW	(Scotland) Jack Peddie	20	16	3	2	1	0	24	18
FW	(England) James Stott	26	2	5	0	4	0	35	2
FW	(Scotland) Billy Smith	10	4	0	0	4	2	14	6
FW	(Scotland) Willie Wardrope	26	12	5	1	4	1	35	14

== Competitions ==
Win Draw Loss

=== League ===
Round	1	2	3	4	5	6	7	8	9	10	11	12	13	14	15	16	17	18	19	20	21	22	23	24	25	26	27	28	29	30
Result	4–1	3–2	3–1	3–2	0–3	2–0	0–0	2–0	0–2	1–0	4–0	3–1	1–3	3–2	0–1	2–1	3–1	1–1	1–0	4–2	1–3	3–0	3–1	4–1	2–0	4–0	5–2	1–1	1–0	0–1
Position	4th	5th	4th	4th	5th	4th	3rd	3rd	4th	3rd	3rd	2nd	3rd	3rd	3rd	3rd	3rd	3rd	3rd	2nd	3rd	2nd	2nd	2nd	2nd	2nd	2nd	2nd	2nd	2nd

=== FA Cup ===
Match	1	2	3	4	5
Result	6–0	4–1	2–0	2–1	0–1

=== Test Matches ===
Match	1	2	3	4
Result	2–1	0–1	3–4	4–0

=== Friendlies ===
Match	1	2	3	4	5	6
Result	1–3	1–1	6–2	4–4	1–1	1–1

== Matches ==
=== League ===
4 September 1897	Newcastle United	4–1	Woolwich Arsenal	Newcastle upon Tyne
	Wardrope; Campbell; Lennox	(Report)	McGeoch	Stadium: St James' Park; Attendance: 10,000

11 September 1897	Walsall	2–3	Newcastle United	Walsall
	Goal	(Report)	Wardrope (o.g.) (o.g.)	Stadium: Hillary Street; Attendance: 4,000

18 September 1897	Newcastle United	3–1	Burton Swifts	Newcastle upon Tyne
	Wardrope; R. Allen; Stott	(Report)	Goal	Stadium: St James' Park; Attendance: 12,000

25 September 1897	Lincoln City	2–3	Newcastle United	Lincoln
	Goal	(Report)	Wardrope; Campbell	Stadium: Sincil Bank; Attendance: 3,000

2 October 1897	Burnley	3–0	Newcastle United	Burnley
	Goal	(Report)		Stadium: Turf Moor; Attendance: 8,000

9 October 1897	Newcastle United	2–0	Newton Heath	Newcastle upon Tyne
	Aitken; Harvey	(Report)		Stadium: St James' Park; Attendance: 14,000

16 October 1897	Woolwich Arsenal	0–0	Newcastle United	London
		(Report)		Stadium: Manor Ground; Attendance: 12,000

23 October 1897	Newcastle United	2–0	Blackpool	Newcastle upon Tyne
	Aitken; Campbell	(Report)		Stadium: St James' Park; Attendance: 8,000

6 November 1897	Grimsby Town	2–0	Newcastle United	Grimsby
	Goal	(Report)		Stadium: Abbey Park; Attendance: 5,000

13 November 1897	Newton Heath	0–1	Newcastle United	Manchester
		(Report)	Wardrope	Stadium: Bank Street; Attendance: 6,000

27 November 1897	Newcastle United	4–0	Small Heath	Newcastle upon Tyne
	Wardrope; Peddie; Campbell	(Report)		Stadium: St James' Park; Attendance: 11,000

4 December 1897	Gainsborough Trinity	1–3	Newcastle United	Gainsborough
	Goal	(Report)	Campbell; Harvey; Ostler	Stadium: The Northolme; Attendance: 700

18 December 1897	Burton Swifts	3–1	Newcastle United	Burton upon Trent
	Goal	(Report)	White	Stadium: Peel Croft

25 December 1897	Blackpool	2–3	Newcastle United	Blackpool
	Goal	(Report)	Wardrope; Campbell; Stott	Stadium: Athletic Grounds; Attendance: 4,000

27 December 1897	Newcastle United	0–1	Burnley	Newcastle upon Tyne
		(Report)	Goal	Stadium: St James' Park; Attendance: 24,959

1 January 1898	Newcastle United	2–1	Walsall	Newcastle upon Tyne
	Peddie; R. Allen	(Report)	Goal	Stadium: St James' Park; Attendance: 16,000

3 January 1898	Newcastle United	3–1	Loughborough	Newcastle upon Tyne
	Peddie; Ostler (o.g.)	(Report)	Goal	Stadium: St James' Park; Attendance: 4,000

8 January 1898	Manchester City	1–1	Newcastle United	Manchester
	Whitehead	(Report)	R. Allen	Stadium: Hyde Road; Attendance: 20,000

15 January 1898	Newcastle United	1–0	Darwen	Newcastle upon Tyne
	(o.g.)	(Report)		Stadium: St James' Park; Attendance: 10,000

22 January 1898	Newcastle United	4–2	Leicester Fosse	Newcastle upon Tyne
	Aitken; Peddie	(Report)	Goal	Stadium: St James' Park; Attendance: 10,000

19 February 1898	Luton Town	3–1	Newcastle United	Luton
	Goal	(Report)	R. Allen	Stadium: Dunstable Road; Attendance: 3,500

26 February 1898	Newcastle United	3–0	Lincoln City	Newcastle upon Tyne
	Wardrope; Smith	(Report)		Stadium: St James' Park; Attendance: 10,000

5 March 1898	Darwen	1–3	Newcastle United	Darwen
	Goal	(Report)	Peddie	Stadium: Barley Bank; Attendance: 2,000

12 March 1898	Newcastle United	5–1	Luton Town	Newcastle upon Tyne
	Wardrope; Harvey	(Report)	Goal	Stadium: St James' Park; Attendance: 15,000

16 March 1898	Newcastle United	2–0	Manchester City	Newcastle upon Tyne
	Peddie; Aitken	(Report)		Stadium: St James' Park; Attendance: 17,000

26 March 1898	Newcastle United	4–0	Grimsby Town	Newcastle upon Tyne
	Campbell; Smith; Peddie	(Report)		Stadium: St James' Park; Attendance: 4,000

2 April 1898	Newcastle United	5–2	Gainsborough Trinity	Newcastle upon Tyne
	Smith; Peddie	(Report)	Goal	Stadium: St James' Park; Attendance: 12,000

9 April 1898	Leicester Fosse	1–1	Newcastle United	Leicester
	Goal	(Report)	Peddie	Stadium: Filbert Street; Attendance: 6,000

11 April 1898	Loughborough	0–1	Newcastle United	Loughborough
		(Report)	Campbell	Stadium: Athletic Ground; Attendance: 2,000

12 April 1898	Small Heath	1–0	Newcastle United	Birmingham
	Goal	(Report)		Stadium: Muntz Street; Attendance: 5,000

=== FA Cup ===
30 October 1897 Third Qual. Round	Newcastle United	6–0	Willington Athletic	Newcastle upon Tyne
	Aitken; Campbell; Jackson	(Report)		Stadium: St James' Park; Attendance: 6,000

20 November 1897 Fourth Qual. Round	Stockton	1–4	Newcastle United	Stockton-on-Tees
	Goal	(Report)	Campbell; Harvey; Ghee; Jackson	Stadium: Victoria Ground; Attendance: 8,000

11 December 1897 Fifth Qual. Round	Middlesbrough	0–2	Newcastle United	Middlesbrough
		(Report)	Wardrope; Harvey	Stadium: Linthorpe Road; Attendance: 6,000

29 January 1898 Round 1	Preston North End	1–2	Newcastle United	Preston
	(o.g.)	(Report)	Peddie	Stadium: Deepdale; Attendance: 15,000

12 February 1898 Round 2	Southampton	1–0	Newcastle United	Southampton
	Buchanan	(Report)		Stadium: The Dell; Attendance: 14,000

=== Test Matches ===
20 April 1898	Newcastle United	2–1	Stoke City	Newcastle upon Tyne
	Smith; Harvey	(Report)	Kennedy	Stadium: St James' Park; Attendance: 17,000

23 April 1898	Stoke City	1–0	Newcastle United	Stoke-on-Trent
	Maxwell	(Report)		Stadium: Victoria Ground; Attendance: 20,000

28 April 1898	Blackburn Rovers	4–3	Newcastle United	Blackburn
	Goal	(Report)	Wardrope; Smith; Aitken	Stadium: Ewood Park; Attendance: 30,000

30 April 1898	Newcastle United	4–0	Blackburn Rovers	Newcastle upon Tyne
	Campbell; Harvey; Ghee; Jackson	(Report)		Stadium: St James' Park; Attendance: 13,324

=== Friendlies ===
1 September 1897	Newcastle United	1–3	Sunderland	Newcastle upon Tyne
	Ghee		Goal	Stadium: St James' Park; Attendance: 12,000

6 September 1897	Newcastle United	1–1	Hibernian	Newcastle upon Tyne
	Stott		Goal	Stadium: St James' Park; Attendance: 4,000

4 January 1898	South Shields	2–6	Newcastle United	South Shields
	Goal		Campbell; Peddie	Attendance: 2,000

5 February 1898	Newcastle United	4–4	Derby County	Newcastle upon Tyne
	Aitken; Peddie; Ostler; Allan		Goal	Stadium: St James' Park; Attendance: 7,000

19 March 1898	Newcastle United	1–1	Sunderland	Newcastle upon Tyne
	Wardrope		Goal	Stadium: St James' Park; Attendance: 14,000

16 April 1898	Newcastle United	1–1	West Bromwich Albion	Newcastle upon Tyne
	Blyth		Goal	Stadium: St James' Park; Attendance: 10,000
