= 1896–97 Newcastle United F.C. season =

Newcastle United
1896–97 season
- Manager: Selection committee (overseen by Frank Watt)
- Stadium: St James' Park
- Football League Second Division: 5th
- FA Cup: First Round
- Top goalscorer: League: Richard Smellie (15); All: Richard Smellie (15)
- Highest home attendance: 17,000 (vs. Notts County)
- Lowest home attendance: 4,000 (vs. Burton Swifts)
- Average home league attendance: 8,399
Home colours	Away colours

The 1896–97 season was Newcastle United's fourth season in the Football League Second Division.

== Appearances and goals ==
Pos.	Name	League		FA Cup		Total	
Pos.	Name	Apps	Goals	Apps	Goals	Apps	Goals
GK	(England) Charlie Watts	30	0	1	0	31	0
DF	(Scotland) Robert Foyers	9	0	0	0	9	0
DF	(Scotland) Robert McDermid	6	0	0	0	6	0
DF	(Scotland) Thomas Stewart	17	0	1	0	18	0
DF	(Scotland) John White	28	0	1	0	29	0
MF	(Scotland) George Adams	12	1	0	0	12	1
MF	(Scotland) Andy Aitken	30	11	1	0	31	11
MF	(Scotland) John Auld	14	3	1	0	15	3
MF	(England) Jack Carr	1	0	0	0	1	0
MF	(Scotland) William Graham	2	0	0	0	2	0
MF	(Scotland) William Miller	17	1	0	0	17	1
MF	(Scotland) Jack Ostler	15	1	1	0	16	1
FW	(England) Thomas Blyth	1	1	0	0	1	1
FW	(Scotland) James Collins	10	1	1	0	11	1
FW	(Scotland) John Connell	24	3	1	0	25	3
FW	J Kinsella	2	0	0	0	2	0
FW	(Scotland) Malcolm Lennox	19	4	0	0	19	4
FW	(Scotland) David Smellie	26	15	1	0	27	15
FW	(England) James Stott	29	3	1	0	30	3
FW	(England) Willie Thompson	9	1	0	0	9	1
FW	(Scotland) Willie Wardrope	29	11	1	0	30	11

== Competitions ==
Win Draw Loss

=== League ===
Round	1	2	3	4	5	6	7	8	9	10	11	12	13	14	15	16	17	18	19	20	21	22	23	24	25	26	27	28	29	30
Result	1–3	4–3	1–3	0–4	5–1	3–0	2–1	2–1	1–2	3–1	4–1	1–0	2–2	2–3	0–2	2–0	2–1	0–5	4–1	2–0	3–0	0–3	2–0	1–4	1–2	2–1	2–0	3–0	0–3	1–5
Position	12th	12th	13th	14th	11th	10th	7th	5th	8th	5th	5th	4th	4th	5th	5th	4th	4th	5th	4th	3rd	3rd	4th	4th	4th	4th	4th	4th	4th	4th	5th

=== FA Cup ===
Match	1
Result	0–5

=== Friendlies ===
Match	1	2	3	4	5	6	7	8	9	10	11	12	13	14	15	16	17
Result	1–1	2–2	0–3	1–1	4–1	1–2	2–1	3–1	4–0	5–0	5–2	3–0	3–0	3–1	1–0	3–0	0–3

== Matches ==
=== League ===
5 September 1896	Small Heath	3–1	Newcastle United	Birmingham
	Goal	(Report)	Thompson	Stadium: Muntz Street; Attendance: 4,000

12 September 1896	Newcastle United	4–3	Small Heath	Newcastle upon Tyne
	Smellie; Lennox	(Report)	Goal	Stadium: St James' Park; Attendance: 10,853

17 September 1896	Notts County	3–1	Newcastle United	Nottingham
	Goal	(Report)	Stott	Stadium: County Ground; Attendance: 5,000

26 September 1896	Newton Heath	4–0	Newcastle United	Manchester
	Cassidy; Donaldson	(Report)		Stadium: Bank Street; Attendance: 7,000

3 October 1896	Newcastle United	5–1	Darwen	Newcastle upon Tyne
	Wardrope; Smellie	(Report)	Goal	Stadium: St James' Park; Attendance: 7,000

10 October 1896	Newcastle United	3–0	Grimsby Town	Newcastle upon Tyne
	Aitken; Stott	(Report)		Stadium: St James' Park; Attendance: 5,000

17 October 1896	Manchester City	1–2	Newcastle United	Manchester
	Robinson	(Report)	Smellie; Auld	Stadium: Hyde Road; Attendance: 7,000

24 October 1896	Lincoln City	1–2	Newcastle United	Lincoln
	Goal	(Report)	Wardrope; Connell	Stadium: Sincil Bank; Attendance: 2,000

7 November 1896	Darwen	2–1	Newcastle United	Darwen
	Goal	(Report)	Miller	Stadium: Barley Bank

14 November 1896	Newcastle United	3–1	Leicester Fosse	Newcastle upon Tyne
	Wardrope; Smellie	(Report)	Goal	Stadium: St James' Park; Attendance: 6,000

28 November 1896	Newcastle United	4–1	Loughborough	Newcastle upon Tyne
	Wardrope; Aitken; Connell; Lennox	(Report)	Goal	Stadium: St James' Park; Attendance: 7,000

5 December 1896	Burton Wanderers	0–1	Newcastle United	Burton upon Trent
		(Report)	Aitken	Stadium: Derby Turn

12 December 1896	Newcastle United	2–2	Notts County	Newcastle upon Tyne
	Wardrope; Aitken	(Report)	Goal	Stadium: St James' Park; Attendance: 17,000

26 December 1896	Grimsby Town	3–2	Newcastle United	Grimsby
	Goal	(Report)	Wardrope; Stott	Stadium: Abbey Park; Attendance: 7,000

28 December 1896	Gainsborough Trinity	2–0	Newcastle United	Gainsborough
	Goal	(Report)		Stadium: The Northolme; Attendance: 7,000

1 January 1897	Newcastle United	2–0	Newton Heath	Newcastle upon Tyne
	Wardrope; Aitken	(Report)		Stadium: St James' Park; Attendance: 16,125

2 January 1897	Newcastle United	2–1	Lincoln City	Newcastle upon Tyne
	Aitken; Smellie	(Report)	Goal	Stadium: St James' Park; Attendance: 12,000

9 January 1987	Leicester Fosse	5–0	Newcastle United	Leicester
	Goal	(Report)		Stadium: Filbert Street; Attendance: 3,000

16 January 1897	Newcastle United	4–1	Blackpool	Newcastle upon Tyne
	Wardrope; Smellie; Collins; Auld	(Report)	Goal	Stadium: St James' Park; Attendance: 8,000

23 January 1897	Newcastle United	2–0	Woolwich Arsenal	Newcastle upon Tyne
	Aitken; Auld	(Report)		Stadium: St James' Park; Attendance: 6,000

6 February 1897	Newcastle United	3–0	Manchester City	Newcastle upon Tyne
	Wardrope; Aitken	(Report)		Stadium: St James' Park; Attendance: 9,000

20 February 1897	Loughborough	3–0	Newcastle United	Loughborough
	Goal	(Report)		Stadium: Athletic Ground; Attendance: 2,000

6 March 1897	Newcastle United	2–0	Walsall	Newcastle upon Tyne
	Connell; Ostler (pen.)	(Report)		Stadium: St James' Park; Attendance: 6,000

13 March 1897	Blackpool	4–1	Newcastle United	Blackpool
	Goal	(Report)	Smellie	Stadium: Raikes Hall; Attendance: 3,000

20 March 1897	Newcastle United	1–2	Gainsborough Trinity	Newcastle upon Tyne
	Lennox	(Report)	Goal	Stadium: St James' Park; Attendance: 6,000

27 March 1897	Newcastle United	2–1	Burton Swifts	Newcastle upon Tyne
	Blyth; Lennox	(Report)	Goal	Stadium: St James' Park; Attendance: 4,000

3 April 1897	Walsall	0–2	Newcastle United	Walsall
		(Report)	Aitken; Smellie	Stadium: Hillary Street; Attendance: 4,000

10 April 1897	Newcastle United	3–0	Burton Wanderers	Newcastle upon Tyne
	Aitken; Smellie	(Report)		Stadium: St James' Park; Attendance: 6,000

12 April 1897	Burton Swifts	3–0	Newcastle United	Burton upon Trent
	Goal	(Report)		Stadium: Peel Croft

16 April 1897	Woolwich Arsenal	5–1	Newcastle United	London
	O'Brien; Caldwell; Boyle; Brock	(Report)	Adams	Stadium: Manor Ground; Attendance: 7,000

=== FA Cup ===
30 January 1897 Round 1	Aston Villa	5–0	Newcastle United	Birmingham
	Wheldon; Athersmith; Smith (o.g.)	(Report)		Stadium: Villa Park; Attendance: 7,000

=== Friendlies ===
1 September 1896	Newcastle United	1–1	Hibernian	Newcastle upon Tyne
	Thompson		Goal	Stadium: St James' Park; Attendance: 5,000

2 September 1896	Newcastle United	2–2	Sunderland	Newcastle upon Tyne
	Aitken		Goal	Stadium: St James' Park; Attendance: 8,000

7 September 1896	Newcastle United	0–3	St Bernard's	Newcastle upon Tyne
			Goal	Stadium: St James' Park; Attendance: 4,500

23 September 1896	Sunderland	1–1	Newcastle United	Sunderland
	Goal		Wardrope	Stadium: Newcastle Road; Attendance: 6,000

31 October 1896	Newcastle United	4–1	Burnley	Newcastle upon Tyne
	Auld; Wardrope; Smellie		Goal	Stadium: St James' Park; Attendance: 5,000

16 November 1896	Darlington	2–1	Newcastle United	Darlington
	Goal		Wardrope	Stadium: Feethams; Attendance: 2,000

21 November 1896	Leith Athletic	1–2	Newcastle United	Edinburgh
	Goal		Aitken; Smellie	Stadium: Old Meadowbank; Attendance: 1,200

25 December 1896	Newcastle United	3–1	Dundee	Newcastle upon Tyne
	Wardrope; Thompson; Milne		Goal	Stadium: St James' Park; Attendance: 10,000

13 February 1897	Newcastle United	4–0	Grimsby Town	Newcastle upon Tyne
	Aitken; Connell; Blyth			Stadium: St James' Park; Attendance: 4,000

13 February 1897	Newcastle United	5–0	Leith Athletic	Newcastle upon Tyne
	Connell; Aitken; Lennox			Stadium: St James' Park; Attendance: 4,000

31 March 1897	Newcastle United	5–2	Sunderland	Newcastle upon Tyne
	Lennox; Aitken; Thompson (pen.)		Goal	Stadium: St James' Park; Attendance: 3,000

17 April 1897	Newcastle United	3–0	Heart of Midlothian	Newcastle upon Tyne
	Blyth; Aitken			Stadium: St James' Park; Attendance: 4,000

20 April 1897	Newcastle United	3–0	St Mirren	Newcastle upon Tyne
	Stewart; Smellie; Aitken			Stadium: St James' Park; Attendance: 2,000

24 April 1897	Newcastle United	3–1	Rangers	Newcastle upon Tyne
	Connell; Lennox; Smellie		Goal	Stadium: St James' Park; Attendance: 7,000

26 April 1897	Newcastle United	1–0	Third Lanark	Newcastle upon Tyne
	Aitken			Stadium: St James' Park; Attendance: 1,000

28 April 1897	Newcastle United	3–0	Sunderland	Newcastle upon Tyne
	Aitken; Ostler			Stadium: St James' Park; Attendance: 4,000

30 April 1897	Newcastle United	0–3	Hibernian	Newcastle upon Tyne
			Goal	Stadium: St James' Park; Attendance: 3,000
