= 1895–96 Newcastle United F.C. season =

Newcastle United
1895–96 season
- Stadium: St James' Park
- Football League Second Division: 5th
- FA Cup: Second round
- Top goalscorer: League: Willie Wardrope (14); All: Willie Wardrope (20)
- Highest home attendance: 14,250 (vs. Bury)
- Lowest home attendance: 3,000 (vs. Tow Law Town)
- Average home league attendance: 7,013
| Home colours | Away colours |

The 1895–96 season was Newcastle United's third season in the Football League Second Division.

== Appearances and goals ==
| Pos. | Name | League | | FA Cup | | Total | |
| Pos. | Name | Apps | Goals | Apps | Goals | Apps | Goals |
|---|---|---|---|---|---|---|---|
| GK | (Scotland) John Henderson | 30 | 0 | 5 | 0 | 35 | 0 |
| GK | (England) W.A. Ward | 0 | 0 | 1 | 0 | 1 | 0 |
| DF | (Scotland) Robert Foyers | 25 | 0 | 5 | 0 | 30 | 0 |
| DF | (Scotland) Robert McDermid | 30 | 1 | 6 | 0 | 36 | 1 |
| DF | (England) John Warburton | 3 | 0 | 0 | 0 | 3 | 0 |
| MF | (Scotland) George Adams | 1 | 0 | 0 | 0 | 1 | 0 |
| MF | (Scotland) Andy Aitken | 27 | 10 | 5 | 3 | 32 | 13 |
| MF | (England) Jack Carr | 1 | 0 | 0 | 0 | 1 | 0 |
| MF | (Scotland) William Miller | 25 | 1 | 6 | 0 | 31 | 1 |
| FW | (Scotland) James Collins | 24 | 8 | 6 | 2 | 30 | 10 |
| MF | (Scotland) William Graham | 30 | 2 | 6 | 1 | 36 | 3 |
| FW | (Scotland) Malcolm Lennox | 23 | 12 | 3 | 1 | 26 | 13 |
| FW | (Scotland) James Logan | 7 | 5 | 2 | 3 | 9 | 8 |
| FW | (Scotland) John McDonald | 6 | 2 | 0 | 0 | 6 | 2 |
| FW | (Scotland) William McKay | 18 | 6 | 3 | 1 | 21 | 7 |
| FW | C Quinn | 1 | 0 | 0 | 0 | 1 | 0 |
| FW | O Reid | 2 | 0 | 0 | 0 | 2 | 0 |
| FW | (England) James Stott | 30 | 4 | 6 | 2 | 36 | 6 |
| FW | (England) Willie Thompson | 17 | 5 | 6 | 5 | 23 | 10 |
| FW | (Scotland) Willie Wardrope | 30 | 14 | 6 | 6 | 36 | 20 |

== Competitions ==
Win Draw Loss

=== League ===
| Round | 1 | 2 | 3 | 4 | 5 | 6 | 7 | 8 | 9 | 10 | 11 | 12 | 13 | 14 | 15 | 16 | 17 | 18 | 19 | 20 | 21 | 22 | 23 | 24 | 25 | 26 | 27 | 28 | 29 | 30 |
|---|---|---|---|---|---|---|---|---|---|---|---|---|---|---|---|---|---|---|---|---|---|---|---|---|---|---|---|---|---|---|
| Result | 3–0 | 1–5 | 5–1 | 1–1 | 1–0 | 1–2 | 2–1 | 4–4 | 7–2 | 1–3 | 6–1 | 6–0 | 1–2 | 0–4 | 1–0 | 5–0 | 2–5 | 1–5 | 3–1 | 0–3 | 4–0 | 3–0 | 0–1 | 1–0 | 4–1 | 4–2 | 5–0 | 1–2 | 0–2 | 0–2 |
| Position | 1st | 9th | 7th | 7th | 7th | 9th | 6th | 6th | 6th | 8th | 8th | 6th | 8th | 8th | 7th | 5th | 7th | 7th | 6th | 6th | 6th | 4th | 6th | 5th | 5th | 5th | 5th | 5th | 5th | 5th |

=== FA Cup ===
| Match | 1 | 2 | 3 | 4 | 5 | 6 |
|---|---|---|---|---|---|---|
| Result | 8–0 | 4–1 | 5–0 | 4–0 | 4–0 | 1–3 |

=== Friendlies ===
| Match | 1 | 2 | 3 | 4 | 5 | 6 | 7 | 8 | 9 | 10 | 11 | 12 |
|---|---|---|---|---|---|---|---|---|---|---|---|---|
| Result | 1–2 | 3–0 | 3–5 | 0–4 | 2–2 | 0–0 | 3–3 | 3–1 | 1–1 | 4–2 | 1–4 | 3–3 |

== Matches ==
=== League ===
| 7 September 1895 | Newcastle United | 3–0 | Loughborough | Newcastle upon Tyne |
| | Wardrope; Aitken; Logan | (Report) | | Stadium: St James' Park; Attendance: 7,000 |

| 14 September 1895 | Liverpool | 5–1 | Newcastle United | Liverpool |
| | Becton; Bradshaw; Ross | (Report) | Logan | Stadium: Anfield; Attendance: 8,000 |

| 21 September 1895 | Newcastle United | 5–1 | Notts County | Newcastle upon Tyne |
| | Aitken; Logan; McKay | (Report) | Goal | Stadium: St James' Park; Attendance: 7,000 |

| 28 September 1895 | Rotherham Town | 1–1 | Newcastle United | Rotherham |
| | Goal | (Report) | Logan | Stadium: Clifton Lane; Attendance: 2,000 |

| 5 October 1895 | Newcastle United | 1–0 | Liverpool | Newcastle upon Tyne |
| | Wardrope | (Report) | | Stadium: St James' Park; Attendance: 12,000 |

| 19 October 1895 | Newton Heath | 2–1 | Newcastle United | Manchester |
| | Cassidy; Peters | (Report) | Logan | Stadium: Bank Street; Attendance: 8,000 |

| 26 October 1895 | Newcastle United | 2–1 | Newton Heath | Newcastle upon Tyne |
| | Wardrope (o.g.) | (Report) | Kennedy | Stadium: St James' Park; Attendance: 7,000 |

| 9 November 1895 | Darwen | 4–4 | Newcastle United | Darwen |
| | Goal | (Report) | Wardrope; Aitken; Thompson; Collins | Stadium: Barley Bank; Attendance: 2,000 |

| 16 November 1895 | Newcastle United | 7–2 | Darwen | Newcastle upon Tyne |
| | Wardrope; Aitken; Collins; Lennox; McDermidd | (Report) | Goal | Stadium: St James' Park; Attendance: 6,000 |

| 7 December 1895 | Burton Swifts | 3–1 | Newcastle United | Burton upon Trent |
| | Goal | (Report) | Wardrope | Stadium: Peel Croft; Attendance: 2,000 |

| 21 December 1895 | Newcastle United | 6–1 | Rotherham Town | Newcastle upon Tyne |
| | Wardrope; McKay; Lennox; Stott | (Report) | Goal | Stadium: St James' Park; Attendance: 5,000 |

| 25 December 1895 | Newcastle United | 6–0 | Crewe Alexandra | Newcastle upon Tyne |
| | Wardrope; Aitken; McKay; Collins; Lennox | (Report) | | Stadium: St James' Park; Attendance: 8,000 |

| 26 December 1895 | Grimsby Town | 2–1 | Newcastle United | Grimsby |
| | Goal | (Report) | Collins | Stadium: Abbey Park; Attendance: 4,000 |

| 28 December 1895 | Lincoln City | 4–0 | Newcastle United | Lincoln |
| | Goal | (Report) | | Stadium: Sincil Bank; Attendance: 1,500 |

| 1 January 1896 | Newcastle United | 1–0 | Leicester Fosse | Newcastle upon Tyne |
| | Aitken | (Report) | | Stadium: St James' Park; Attendance: 7,000 |

| 2 January 1896 | Newcastle United | 5–0 | Lincoln City | Newcastle upon Tyne |
| | Aitken; Lennox; Stott; Collins | (Report) | | Stadium: St James' Park; Attendance: 5,000 |

| 4 January 1896 | Manchester City | 5–2 | Newcastle United | Manchester |
| | Morris; Hill; Finnerhan | (Report) | McKay; Lennox | Stadium: Hyde Road; Attendance: 10,000 |

| 11 January 1896 | Newcastle United | 1–5 | Grimsby Town | Newcastle upon Tyne |
| | Collins | (Report) | Goal | Stadium: St James' Park; Attendance: 5,000 |

| 18 January 1896 | Newcastle United | 3–1 | Woolwich Arsenal | Newcastle upon Tyne |
| | McKay; Stott; Miller | (Report) | Jenkyns (pen.) | Stadium: St James' Park; Attendance: 6,000 |

| 25 January 1896 | Crewe Alexandra | 3–0 | Newcastle United | Crewe |
| | Goal | (Report) | | Stadium: Alexandra Stadium; Attendance: 8,000 |

| 8 February 1896 | Newcastle United | 4–0 | Burton Wanderers | Newcastle upon Tyne |
| | Lennox; Graham | (Report) | | Stadium: St James' Park; Attendance: 7,000 |

| 22 February 1896 | Burton Wanderers | 0–3 | Newcastle United | Burton upon Trent |
| | | (Report) | Thompson; Lennox | Stadium: Derby Turn; Attendance: 3,000 |

| 7 March 1896 | Loughborough | 1–0 | Newcastle United | Loughborough |
| | Goal | (Report) | | Stadium: Bromhead; Attendance: 2,000 |

| 14 March 1896 | Notts County | 0–1 | Newcastle United | Nottingham |
| | | (Report) | Aitken | Stadium: County Ground; Attendance: 5,000 |

| 21 March 1896 | Newcastle United | 4–1 | Manchester City | Newcastle upon Tyne |
| | Wardrope; Thompson; Collins; Lennox | (Report) | Davies | Stadium: St James' Park; Attendance: 12,000 |

| 3 April 1896 | Newcastle United | 4–2 | Burslem Port Vale | Newcastle upon Tyne |
| | McDonald; Collins (o.g.) | (Report) | Simpson; Randles | Stadium: St James' Park; Attendance: 8,000 |

| 4 April 1896 | Newcastle United | 5–0 | Burton Swifts | Newcastle upon Tyne |
| | Wardrope; Thompson; Stott | (Report) | | Stadium: St James' Park; Attendance: 7,000 |

| 6 April 1896 | Woolwich Arsenal | 2–1 | Newcastle United | London |
| | O'Brien; Mortimer | (Report) | (o.g.) | Stadium: Manor Ground; Attendance: 10,000 |

| 7 April 1896 | Leicester Fosse | 2–0 | Newcastle United | Leicester |
| | McDonald | (Report) | | Stadium: Filbert Street; Attendance: 5,000 |

| 20 April 1896 | Burslem Port Vale | 2–0 | Newcastle United | Stoke-on-Trent |
| | J. Mason; Randles | (Report) | | Stadium: Athletic Ground; Attendance: 2,000 |

=== FA Cup ===
| 12 October 1895 First Qual. Round | West Hartlepool Rangers | 0–8 | Newcastle United | Hartlepool |
| | | (Report) | Logan; Thompson; Collins; Stott; Graham (o.g.) | Attendance: 3,000 |

| 2 November 1895 Second Qual. Round | Newcastle United | 4–1 | Middlesbrough | Newcastle upon Tyne |
| | Wardrope; McKay (o.g.) | (Report) | Goal | Stadium: St James' Park; Attendance: 6,000 |

| 23 November 1895 Third Qual. Round | Newcastle United | 5–0 | Rendall | Newcastle upon Tyne |
| | Wardrope; Aitken; Logan; Thompson | (Report) | | Stadium: St James' Park; Attendance: 3,000 |

| 16 December 1895 Fourth Qual. Round | Newcastle United | 4–0 | Tow Law Town | Newcastle upon Tyne |
| | Wardrope; Thompson; Lennox; Stott | (Report) | | Stadium: St James' Park; Attendance: 3,000 |

| 1 February 1896 Round 1 | Chesterfield | 0–4 | Newcastle United | Chesterfield |
| | | (Report) | Wardrope; Aitken; Thompson | Stadium: Saltergate; Attendance: 5,000 |

| 15 February 1896 Round 2 | Newcastle United | 1–3 | Bury | Newcastle upon Tyne |
| | Thompson | (Report) | Henderson; Millar; Plant | Stadium: St James' Park; Attendance: 14,250 |

=== Friendlies ===
| 2 September 1895 | Newcastle United | 1–2 | Hibernian | Newcastle upon Tyne |
| | McKay | | Goal | Stadium: St James' Park; Attendance: 8,000 |

| 4 September 1895 | Newcastle United | 3–0 | Celtic | Newcastle upon Tyne |
| | Logan; Milne | | | Stadium: St James' Park; Attendance: 6,000 |

| 11 September 1895 | Sunderland | 5–3 | Newcastle United | Sunderland |
| | Goal | | McKay; Graham | Stadium: Newcastle Road; Attendance: 5,000 |

| 30 November 1895 | Newcastle United | 0–4 | Sunderland | Newcastle upon Tyne |
| | | | Goal | Stadium: St James' Park; Attendance: 12,000 |

| 29 February 1896 | Newcastle United | 2–2 | Sunderland | Newcastle upon Tyne |
| | Lennox; Aitken | | Goal | Stadium: St James' Park; Attendance: 5,000 |

| 11 April 1896 | Newcastle United | 0–0 | Clyde | Newcastle upon Tyne |
| | | | | Stadium: St James' Park; Attendance: 2,000 |

| 15 April 1896 | Newcastle United | 3–3 | Newcastle East End | Newcastle upon Tyne |
| | Lennox; Wardrope | | Goal | Stadium: St James' Park; Attendance: 200 |

| 18 April 1896 | Newcastle United | 3–1 | Sheffield United | Newcastle upon Tyne |
| | Wardrope; Lennox | | Goal | Stadium: St James' Park; Attendance: 5,000 |

| 22 April 1896 | Newcastle United | 1–1 | Aston Villa | Newcastle upon Tyne |
| | Lennox | | Goal | Stadium: St James' Park; Attendance: 6,000 |

| 25 April 1896 | Newcastle United | 4–2 | Derby County | Newcastle upon Tyne |
| | Stott; Lennox; Collins | | Goal | Stadium: St James' Park; Attendance: 8,000 |

| 27 April 1896 | Newcastle United | 1–4 | Sheffield Wednesday | Newcastle upon Tyne |
| | Aitken (pen.) | | Goal | Stadium: St James' Park; Attendance: 4,000 |

| 30 April 1896 | Newcastle United | 3–3 | Sunderland | Newcastle upon Tyne |
| | Thompson; Aitken; Collins | | Goal | Stadium: St James' Park; Attendance: 5,000 |
