= White Star Wanderers F.C. =

Defunct association football club

White Star Wanderers
- Full name: White Star Wanderers Football Club
- Founded: 1881
- Dissolved: 1903
- Ground: Marsh Lane
Home colours

White Star Wanderers F.C. was an association football club from Liverpool, then in Lancashire, active around the turn of the 19th century. It was the works football side of the White Star Line.

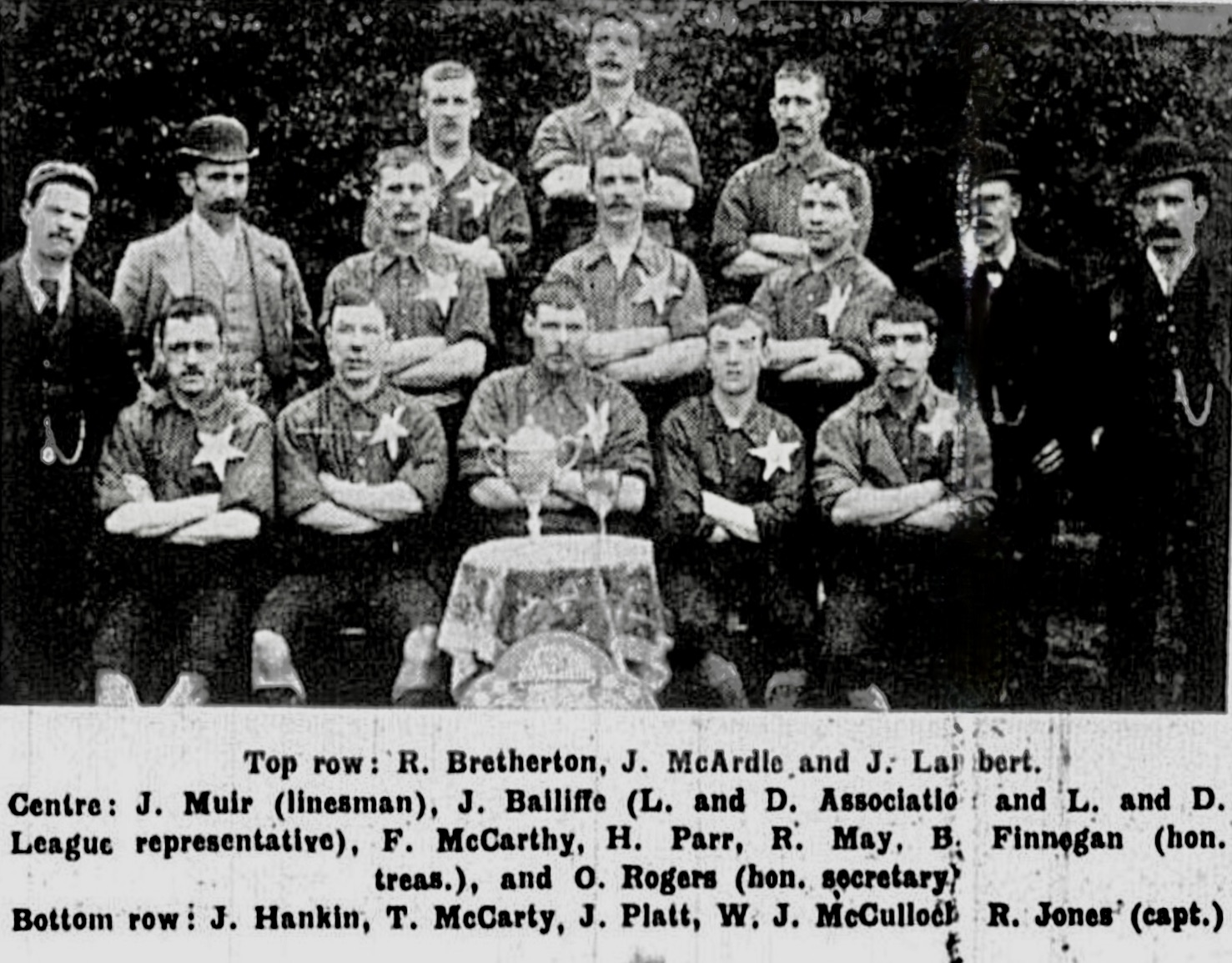
White Star Wanderers F.C., 1896–97

== History ==
The club was founded as Bootle Wanderers, the first record for the club coming from the 1881–82 season, changing its name in February 1893 and recruiting a number of new players, with increased financial backing, as a consequence, with the club joining the Liverpool and District League for the 1893–94 season. The club promptly won the title, with 22 win in 26 matches, and also reached the semi-final of the Liverpool Senior Cup, losing 2–1 at Bootle Athletic's Seaview Ground to a Liverpool F.C. side made up mostly of second XI players, with McLean, McCartney, and Gordon of Liverpool's first team adding strength. The club reached the semi-final again in 1898–99, this time losing to New Brighton Tower.

After winning the Liverpool County FA Shield in 1896–97 - the club's third triumph in four years, after winning it in 1894–95 and 1895–96 - the club stepped up to The Combination for 1897–98. It played in the competition until 1902–03, apart from 1899–1900, when it spent a season in the Lancashire League. The club was generally a mid-table outfit in both competitions.

The Wanderers played in the Lancashire Senior Cup from 1899–1900 to 1902–03, its best performance coming in 1900–01, when it reached the semi-finals. At that stage the club went down 4–0 to Blackburn Rovers. The same season saw the club's best run in the FA Cup qualifying rounds, winning two ties before losing 2–1 at Earlestown, despite scoring after 10 minutes.

The 1902–03 season was the club's last. It was humiliated at Earlestown in the Lancashire Senior Cup, conceding eight in the first half on the way to a 12–1 defeat, and beaten 5–1 at Rochdale Town in the 1902–03 FA Cup qualifying rounds. In March 1903, with the club lying in a customary mid-table position (8th out of 16, with 9 wins and defeats, and 1 draw) the Liverpool FA suspended the club for an unknown, and ostensibly, spurious reason, as the club was reinstated in short order. However the reinstatement was for pride only; "owing to the crippled state of their finances", the club promptly disbanded, and its league record was expunged.

== Colours ==
The club wore red shirts with a white star, which matched the company's flag.

== Ground ==
The club's ground known as Marsh Lane, which was originally shared with the rugby union side Bootle Wasps. The ground's entrance was at the end of Sandfield Grove.

== Notable players ==
- Notable players ( 4 )
