= John Givens =

John Givens may refer to:

- John Givens (footballer), Scottish footballer
- John Givens (basketball), American basketball player and coach
- John Givez, American musician born John Lawrence Givens
