= 1905–06 FA Cup =

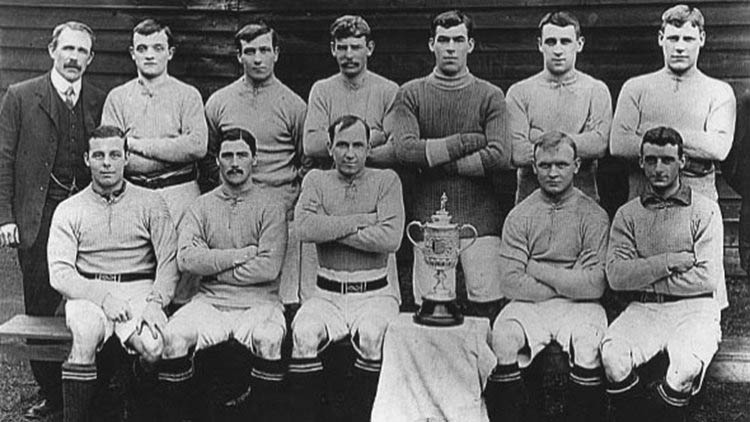
- The Everton team following the club's first FA Cup victory

Tournament details
- Country: England

Final positions
- Champions: Everton (1st title)
- Runners-up: Newcastle United

The 1905–06 FA Cup was the 35th staging of the world's oldest association football competition, the Football Association Challenge Cup (more usually known as the FA Cup). Everton won the competition for the first time, beating Newcastle United 1–0 in the final at Crystal Palace.

Matches were scheduled to be played at the stadium of the team named first on the date specified for each round, which was always a Saturday. If scores were level after 90 minutes had been played, a replay would take place at the stadium of the second-named team later the same week. If the replayed match was drawn further replays would be held at neutral venues until a winner was determined. If scores were level after 90 minutes had been played in a replay, a 30-minute period of extra time would be played.

The Crystal Palace versus Chelsea tie in the third qualifying round led to the Football Association changing the rules. The tie was scheduled to be played on 18 November 1905, and Chelsea were also obliged to play a Football League game against Burnley on the same day. Chelsea were chasing promotion from the Second Division, so they fielded a full strength side in the league and sent a reserve team to the FA Cup match. Crystal Palace won the fixture 7–1. As a result of the outcry, the Football Association amended its rules such that teams must always field their strongest side in the FA Cup.

== Calendar ==
The format of the FA Cup for the season had a preliminary round, four qualifying rounds, four proper rounds, and the semi-finals and final.

Round	Date
Preliminary Round	23 September 1905
First Qualifying Round	7 October 1905
Second Qualifying Round	28 October 1905
Third Qualifying Round	18 November 1905
Fourth Qualifying Round	9 December 1905
First Round Proper	13 January 1906
Second Round Proper	3 February 1906
Third Round Proper	24 February 1906
Fourth Round Proper	10 March 1906
Semi-finals	31 March 1906
Final	21 April 1906

== Qualifying rounds ==
The Football Association reduced the number of places available to non-league clubs in the qualifying rounds of this year's Cup tournament. Restructuring of the competition during the 1905 close-season resulted in the temporary suspension of the extra preliminary, fifth qualifying and sixth qualifying rounds, and the permanent abolition of the Intermediate Round, but also allowed up to 24 non-league clubs to qualify for the main draw (although eleven Football League clubs were still required to enter the tournament in the qualifying stages).

At the end of the fourth qualifying round, the 24 teams progressing to the first round were Stockport County, Barnsley, Hull City, Bradford City, Burton United, Burslem Port Vale, Gainsborough Trinity and Clapton Orient from the Football League along with non-league sides Barrow, Bishop Auckland, Kettering, Crewe Alexandra, Watford, King's Lynn, Northampton Town, Worcester City, Tunbridge Wells Rangers, Norwich City, the Sidcup-based New Crusaders, Brighton & Hove Albion, Swindon Town, Crystal Palace, Staple Hill and Brentford.

Featuring in the competition proper for the first time were Hull City, Clapton Orient, Barrow, King's Lynn, Worcester City, Tunbridge Wells Rangers, Norwich City, New Crusaders and Staple Hill, while Stockport County had not appeared at this stage since 1893-94 and Watford's predecessor club Watford Rovers had last appeared in 1887-88. The current Crystal Palace also claimed a tenuous connection to the original club of that name, which had entered the FA Cup for the final time in 1875-76.

== First Round Proper ==
29 of the 40 clubs from the First and Second divisions joined the 24 clubs who came through the qualifying rounds. Of the League sides not given byes to this round, Chelsea, Hull City, Leeds City and Clapton Orient were entered in the first qualifying round. Chelsea and Leeds City went out in the third qualifying round (to Crystal Palace and Hull City respectively), while the other two teams qualified. Barnsley, Bradford City, Burslem Port Vale, Burton United, Gainsborough Trinity, Glossop and Stockport County were entered in the fourth qualifying round, with only Glossop going out (to Brighton & Hove Albion).

Eleven Southern League clubs were given byes to the first round to set the total number of teams at this stage at 64. These were:

Southampton Millwall Queens Park Rangers Plymouth Argyle Fulham Reading	Portsmouth Bristol Rovers West Ham United New Brompton Tottenham Hotspur

32 matches were scheduled to be played on Saturday 13 January 1906. Six matches were drawn and went to replays on the following Wednesday or Thursday, while Blackpool and Crystal Palace needed a second replay at Villa Park on the subsequent Monday.

Tie no	Home team	Score	Away team	Date
1	Birmingham	1–0	Preston North End	13 January 1906
2	Blackpool	1–1	Crystal Palace	13 January 1906
Replay	Crystal Palace	1–1	Blackpool	17 January 1906
Replay	Blackpool	1–0	Crystal Palace	22 January 1906
3	Bury	1–1	Nottingham Forest	13 January 1906
Replay	Nottingham Forest	6–2	Bury	17 January 1906
4	Liverpool	2–1	Leicester Fosse	13 January 1906
5	Southampton	5–1	Portsmouth	13 January 1906
6	Stoke	1–0	Blackburn Rovers	13 January 1906
7	Aston Villa	11–0	King's Lynn	13 January 1906
8	The Wednesday	1–0	Bristol Rovers	13 January 1906
9	Crewe Alexandra	1–1	Barnsley	13 January 1906
Replay	Barnsley	4–0	Crewe Alexandra	18 January 1906
10	Middlesbrough	3–0	Bolton Wanderers	13 January 1906
11	Sunderland	1–0	Notts County	13 January 1906
12	Derby County	4–0	Kettering	13 January 1906
13	Lincoln City	4–2	Stockport County	13 January 1906
14	Burslem Port Vale	0–3	Gainsborough Trinity	13 January 1906
15	Everton	3–1	West Bromwich Albion	13 January 1906
16	Sheffield United	4–1	Manchester City	13 January 1906
17	Bishop Auckland	0–3	Wolverhampton Wanderers	13 January 1906
18	Woolwich Arsenal	1–1	West Ham United	13 January 1906
Replay	West Ham United	2–3	Woolwich Arsenal	18 January 1906
19	Newcastle United	6–0	Grimsby Town	13 January 1906
20	New Brompton	2–1	Northampton Town	13 January 1906
21	Tottenham Hotspur	2–0	Burnley	13 January 1906
22	Fulham	1–0	Queens Park Rangers	13 January 1906
23	Brentford	2–1	Bristol City	13 January 1906
24	Brighton & Hove Albion	3–0	Swindon Town	13 January 1906
25	Manchester United	7–2	Staple Hill	13 January 1906
26	Norwich City	1–1	Tunbridge Wells Rangers	13 January 1906
Replay	Tunbridge Wells Rangers	0–5	Norwich City	17 January 1906
27	Bradford City	3–2	Barrow	13 January 1906
28	Millwall Athletic	1–0	Burton United	13 January 1906
29	Hull City	0–1	Reading	13 January 1906
30	Clapton Orient	0–0	Chesterfield	13 January 1906
Replay	Chesterfield	3–0	Clapton Orient	17 January 1906
31	New Crusaders	3–6	Plymouth Argyle	13 January 1906
32	Worcester City	0–6	Watford	13 January 1906

== Second Round Proper ==
The 16 second round matches were played on 3 February 1906. Six matches were drawn, with the replays taking place in the following midweek fixture. One of these, the Brighton & Hove Albion v. Middlesbrough match, went to a second replay the following week at Bramall Lane.

Tie no	Home team	Score	Away team	Date
1	Liverpool	1–0	Barnsley	3 February 1906
2	Stoke	0–1	Birmingham	3 February 1906
3	Aston Villa	0–0	Plymouth Argyle	3 February 1906
Replay	Plymouth Argyle	1–5	Aston Villa	7 February 1906
4	The Wednesday	1–1	Millwall Athletic	3 February 1906
Replay	Millwall Athletic	0–3	The Wednesday	8 February 1906
5	Sunderland	1–1	Gainsborough Trinity	3 February 1906
Replay	Sunderland	3–0	Gainsborough Trinity	7 February 1906
6	Derby County	0–0	Newcastle United	3 February 1906
Replay	Newcastle United	2–1	Derby County	7 February 1906
7	Everton	3–0	Chesterfield	3 February 1906
8	Sheffield United	1–2	Blackpool	3 February 1906
9	Woolwich Arsenal	3–0	Watford	3 February 1906
10	New Brompton	0–0	Southampton	3 February 1906
Replay	Southampton	1–0	New Brompton	7 February 1906
11	Tottenham Hotspur	3–2	Reading	3 February 1906
12	Fulham	1–3	Nottingham Forest	3 February 1906
13	Brentford	3–0	Lincoln City	3 February 1906
14	Brighton & Hove Albion	1–1	Middlesbrough	3 February 1906
Replay	Middlesbrough	1–1	Brighton & Hove Albion	7 February 1906
Replay	Brighton & Hove Albion	1–3	Middlesbrough	12 February 1906
15	Manchester United	3–0	Norwich City	3 February 1906
16	Bradford City	5–0	Wolverhampton Wanderers	3 February 1906

== Third Round Proper ==
The eight third round matches were scheduled for 24 February 1906. There was one replay, played in the following midweek fixture.

Tie no	Home team	Score	Away team	Date
1	Liverpool	2–0	Brentford	24 February 1906
2	Southampton	6–1	Middlesbrough	24 February 1906
3	The Wednesday	4–1	Nottingham Forest	24 February 1906
4	Everton	1–0	Bradford City	24 February 1906
5	Woolwich Arsenal	5–0	Sunderland	24 February 1906
6	Newcastle United	5–0	Blackpool	24 February 1906
7	Tottenham Hotspur	1–1	Birmingham	24 February 1906
Replay	Birmingham	2–0	Tottenham Hotspur	28 February 1906
8	Manchester United	5–1	Aston Villa	24 February 1906

== Fourth Round Proper ==
The four fourth round matches were scheduled for 10 March 1906. The Newcastle United v. Birmingham game was drawn, and replayed on 14 March.

Tie no	Home team	Score	Away team	Date
1	Birmingham	2–2	Newcastle United	10 March 1906
Replay	Newcastle United	3–0	Birmingham	14 March 1906
2	Liverpool	3–0	Southampton	10 March 1906
3	Everton	4–3	The Wednesday	10 March 1906
4	Manchester United	2–3	Woolwich Arsenal	10 March 1906

== Semi-finals ==
The semi-final matches were played on 31 March 1906. Everton and Newcastle United won and advanced to the final.

31 March 1906
15:00

Everton	2–0	Liverpool

Villa Park, Birmingham

31 March 1906
15:00

Newcastle United	2–0	Woolwich Arsenal

Victoria Ground, Stoke

== Final ==
The Final was contested by Everton and Newcastle United at Crystal Palace on 21 April 1906. Everton won 1–0 with the goal scored by Alex Young.

=== Match details ===
21 April 1906
15:29 BST

Everton	1–0	Newcastle United
Young 77'

Crystal Palace, London
Attendance: 75,609
Referee: F. Kirkham (Preston)

Everton	Newcastle United
