= 1906 FA Cup final =

1906 FA Cup Final
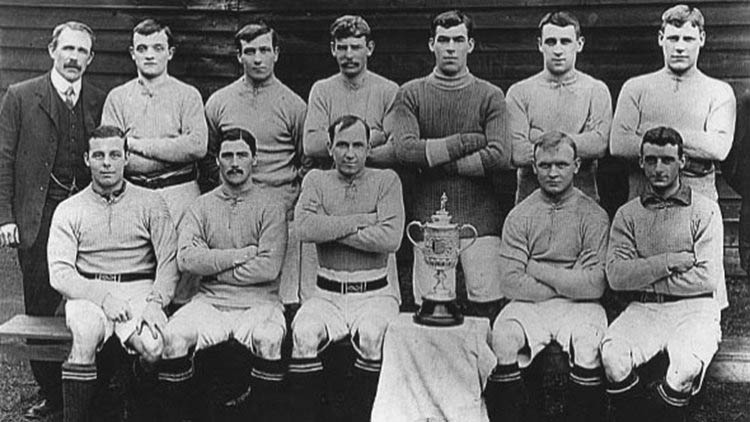
- Everton FC posing with the trophy
- Event: 1905–06 FA Cup
Everton	Newcastle United
1	0
- Date: 21 April 1906
- Venue: Crystal Palace, London
- Referee: Fred Kirkham
- Attendance: 75,609

The 1906 FA Cup final was contested by Everton and Newcastle United at Crystal Palace. Everton won 1–0, the goal scored by Alex "Sandy" Young.

== Match details ==
21 April 1906
15:29 BST

Everton	1–0	Newcastle United
Young 77'

Crystal Palace, London
Attendance: 75,609
Referee: F. Kirkham (Preston)

Everton	Newcastle United

(Ireland) Billy Scott
(England) William Balmer
(England) Jack Crelley
(England) Harry Makepeace
(Scotland) Jack Taylor (c)
(England) Walter Abbott
(England) Jack Sharp
(Scotland) Hugh Bolton
(Scotland) Alex "Sandy" Young
(England) Jimmy Settle
(England) Harold Hardman
Manager:
(England) William C. Cuff

(Scotland) Jimmy Lawrence
(Scotland) Andy McCombie
(England) Jack Carr
(Scotland) Alex Gardner
(Scotland) Andy Aitken
(Scotland) Peter McWilliam
(England) Jock Rutherford
(Scotland) James Howie
(England) Colin Veitch (c)
(Scotland) Ronald Orr
(England) Bert Gosnell
Manager:
(Scotland) Frank Watt

Match rules

- 90 minutes
- 30 minutes of extra-time if necessary
- Replay if scores still level

== Road to the Final ==
Everton
Home teams listed first.

Round 1: Everton 3–1 West Bromwich Albion

Round 2: Chesterfield 0–3 Everton

Round 3: Everton 1–0 Bradford City

Round 4: Everton 4–3 Sheffield Wednesday

Semi-Final: Everton 2–0 Liverpool

Newcastle United
Home teams listed first.

Round 1: Newcastle United 6–0 Grimsby Town

Round 2: Derby County 0–0 Newcastle United

Replay: Newcastle United 2–1 Derby County

Round 3: Newcastle United 5–0 Blackpool

Round 4: Newcastle United 2–2 Birmingham City

Replay: Birmingham City 0–3 Newcastle United

Semi-Final: Woolwich Arsenal 0–2 Newcastle United
