= Jimmy Stevenson =

Scottish footballer

Personal information
- Full name: James Stevenson
- Date of birth: 1877
- Place of birth: Paisley, Scotland
- Date of death: 3 July 1916 (aged 38–39)
- Place of death: Leipzig Salient, near Thiepval, France
- Position: Inside forward

Senior career*
Years	Team	Apps	(Gls)
1893–1894	Ashfield		
1894–1895	Clyde	31	(5)
1895–1898	Derby County	73	(31)
1898–1899	Newcastle United	33	(12)
1900–1901	Bristol City	23	(0)
1901–1902	Grimsby Town	8	(1)
1902	Leicester Fosse	7	(1)
1902–1904	Clyde	14	(5)
- St Mirren
- * Club domestic league appearances and goals

James Stevenson (1877 – 3 July 1916) was a Scottish professional footballer who played in the Football League for Derby County, Newcastle United, Grimsby Town and Leicester Fosse as an inside forward. He also played in the Scottish League for Clyde.

== Personal life ==
After the outbreak of the First World War, Stevenson enlisted as a private in the Highland Light Infantry in Glasgow and was posted to the Western Front in November 1915. On 3 July 1916, he was killed in a failed attack on the Leipzig Salient, during the early stages of the Battle of the Somme. Stevenson is commemorated on the Thiepval Memorial.

== Career statistics ==
Appearances and goals by club, season and competition
Club	Season	League			National Cup		Total	
Club	Season	Division	Apps	Goals	Apps	Goals	Apps	Goals
Clyde	1892–93	Scottish League	16	1	2	0	18	1
Clyde	1894–95	Scottish Division One	15	4	3	0	18	4
Clyde	Total		31	5	5	0	36	5
Derby County	1894–95	First Division	1	0	0	0	1	0
Derby County	1895–96	First Division	25	14	5	0	30	14
Derby County	1896–97	First Division	20	14	0	0	20	14
Derby County	1897–98	First Division	23	3	6	1	29	4
Derby County	1898–99	First Division	4	0	—		4	0
Derby County	Total		55	31	11	1	66	32
Newcastle United	1898–99	First Division	24	7	2	0	26	7
Newcastle United	1899–1900	First Division	9	5	2	1	11	6
Newcastle United	Total		33	12	4	1	37	13
Leicester Fosse	1901–02	Second Division	7	1	0	0	7	1
Clyde	1902–03	Scottish Division Two	13	5	1	1	14	6
Clyde	1903–04	Scottish Division Two	1	0	0	0	1	0
Clyde	Total		45	10	6	1	51	11
Career total			140	54	21	3	161	57
