= Jack Crelley =

English footballer (1881–1946)

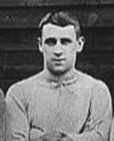

Personal information
- Full name: John Crelley
- Date of birth: 24 September 1881
- Place of birth: Kirkdale, England
- Date of death: 1946 (aged 64–65)
- Position: Full back

Senior career*
Years	Team	Apps	(Gls)
1899–1901	Everton	2	(0)
1901–1902	Millwall Athletic		
1902–1908	Everton	114	(0)
1908–1910	Exeter City		
1910	St Helens Recreation		
Total		116	(0)
- * Club domestic league appearances and goals

John “Jack" Crelley (24 September 1881 – 11 October 1946) was an English footballer who played in the Football League for Everton. He played in the 1906 FA Cup Final as Everton beat Newcastle United 1–0.
