= Willie Wardrope =

Scottish footballer

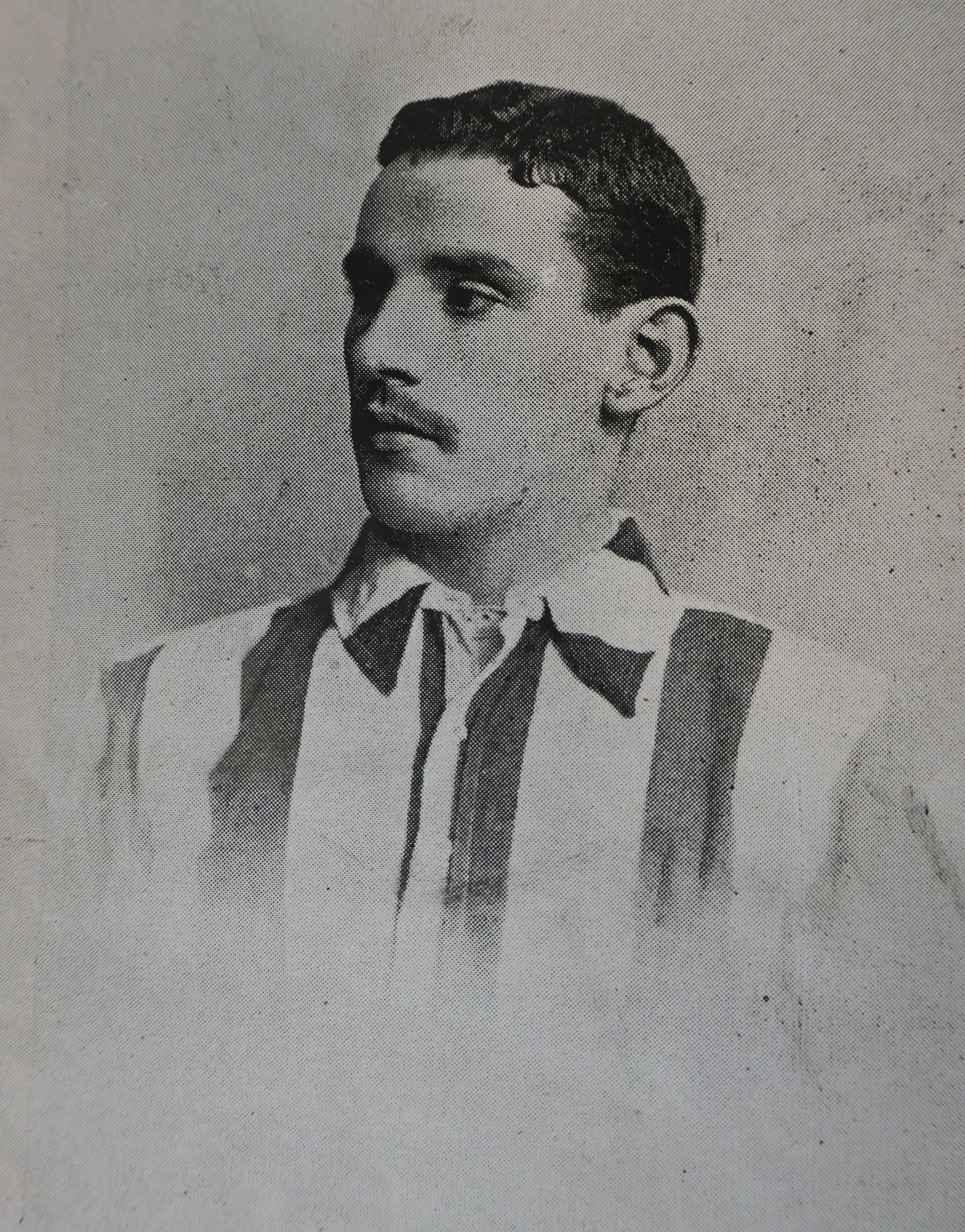

Personal information
- Full name: William Loudon Wardrope
- Date of birth: 9 September 1874
- Place of birth: Wishaw, Scotland
- Date of death: 1911 (aged 36–37)
- Place of death: United States
- Position: Outside forward

Senior career*
Years	Team	Apps	(Gls)
1892–1893	Dalziel Rovers		
1893–1894	Motherwell		
1894–1895	Linthouse		
1895	→ Motherwell (loan)	1	(0)
1895–1900	Newcastle United	127	(44)
1900–1902	Middlesbrough	62	(21)
1902–1904	Third Lanark	42	(14)
1904–1906	Fulham	58	(29)
1906–1907	Swindon Town	38	(8)
1907–1908	Hamilton Academical	31	(6)
1908–1909	Raith Rovers	32	(11)
Total		391	(133)

International career
1903	Scottish League XI	1	(0)
- * Club domestic league appearances and goals

William Loudon Wardrope (9 September 1874 – 1911) was a Scottish footballer who played in the Football League for Middlesbrough and Newcastle United, mainly as an outside left.

== Career ==
Wishaw-born winger Wardrope began his football career at Dalziel Rovers, being selected for Scotland at Junior level before playing for Scottish League Motherwell as an amateur in 1893, and Linthouse in 1894. In August 1895 he joined Football League Second Division side Newcastle United, making his Football League debut and scoring against Loughbrough in September of that year, in a 3–0 win at St James' Park. On 25 December 1895, Wardrope scored in nine consecutive league and cup games and broke a club scoring record. He finished the season as both an ever-present and as Newcastle's top scorer, scoring 20 goals in 36 games including a hat-trick against Darwen in November. Wardrope scored a further 14 goals in the 1897–98 campaign as Newcastle won promotion to the First Division for the first time in their history as Second Division runners-up, qualifying by beating Stoke and Blackburn Rovers in two-legged 'test matches'. He spent two further seasons with the Toon in the top flight before joining Middlesbrough in April 1900 after 51 goals in 145 appearances for the Magpies.

Wardrope had two full seasons at Boro, helping them win promotion to the First Division in 1901–02, scoring 10 goals as they finished Second Division runners-up. But at the end of the season, having scored 24 goals in 73 appearances, he returned to Scotland and joined Third Lanark, winning the Scottish Football League championship in 1903–04 plus two Glasgow Cups; while with the Warriors he was selected to represent the Scottish League team in a 1–0 defeat to the Irish League at Grosvenor Park, Belfast in February 1903.

After two seasons at Cathkin Park he then joined Southern League club Fulham in 1904, scoring 32 goals in 68 appearances for the Cottagers and helping them to win the Southern League championship in 1905–06. He transferred to Swindon Town in the 1906 close season and scored nine times for the Robins in 39 appearances, before returning to Scotland again to join Hamilton Academical in 1907, subsequently joining Raith Rovers in 1908 before his eventual retirement. He emigrated to the United States in 1910, but within a year had died from cholera.

== Career statistics ==
Appearances and goals by club, season and competition
Club	Season	League			FA Cup		Test Matches		Total	
Club	Season	Division	Apps	Goals	Apps	Goals	Apps	Goals	Apps	Goals
Newcastle United	1895–96	Second Division	30	14	6	6	0	0	36	20
Newcastle United	1896–97	Second Division	29	11	1	0	0	0	30	11
Newcastle United	1897–98	Second Division	26	13	5	1	4	1	35	15
Newcastle United	1898–99	First Division	24	2	2	0	0	0	26	2
Newcastle United	1899–1900	First Division	18	4	0	0	0	0	18	4
Newcastle United	Total		127	44	14	7	4	1	145	52
Middlesbrough	1899–1900	Second Division	2	0	0	0	0	0	2	0
Middlesbrough	1900–01	Second Division	33	11	9	3	0	0	42	14
Middlesbrough	1901–02	Second Division	27	10	2	0	0	0	29	10
Middlesbrough	Total		62	21	11	3	0	0	73	24
Career total			189	65	25	10	4	1	218	76

== Sources ==
=== Books ===
- Bolam, Mike (2012). The Newcastle Miscellany. United Kingdom: Vision Sports Publishing. ISBN 978-1-907637-74-2.
