= Robert Hogg (footballer) =

English footballer

Personal information
- Full name: Robert Hogg
- Date of birth: 1877
- Place of birth: Whitburn, South Tyneside, England
- Date of death: 1963 (aged 85–86)
- Position: Inside forward

Senior career*
Years	Team	Apps	(Gls)
1897–1898	Whitburn		
1898–1899	Selbourne		
1899–1902	Sunderland	67	(18)
1902–1904	Grimsby Town	3	(1)
1904–1905	Blackpool	26	(5)
1905–190?	Luton Town		
- * Club domestic league appearances and goals

Robert Hogg (1877–1963) was an English professional footballer who played as an inside forward.
