= Jimmy Haydock =

English footballer

Personal information
- Full name: James Haydock
- Date of birth: 6 December 1872
- Place of birth: Blackburn, England
- Date of death: 24 March 1900
- Place of death: Blackburn, England
- Position: Winger

Senior career*
Years	Team	Apps	(Gls)
1889–1890	Borough Road College		
1890–1897	Blackburn Rovers	66	(21)
Total		66	(21)
- * Club domestic league appearances and goals

James Haydock (6 December 1872 – 24 March 1900) was an English footballer who played in the Football League for Blackburn Rovers.
