= Alex Gardner (footballer) =

Scottish footballer

Personal information
- Full name: Alexander Gardner
- Date of birth: 1877
- Place of birth: Leith, Scotland
- Date of death: 1952 (aged 77)
- Place of death: South Shields, England
- Position: Right half

Senior career*
Years	Team	Apps	(Gls)
1897–1899	Leith Athletic	33	(13)
1899–1910	Newcastle United	279	(22)
Total		312	(35)
- * Club domestic league appearances and goals

Alexander Gardner (1877 – 1952) was a Scottish professional footballer who played as a right half.

== Career ==
Born in Leith, Gardner played for local club Leith Athletic then moved to Newcastle United at the end of 1899, making over 300 appearances in the English Football League and FA Cup over the next decade. He won three League titles: 1904–05, 1906–07 and 1908–09 (plus the 1907 Sheriff of London Charity Shield in 1907), and played in three FA Cup finals in 1905, 1906 and 1908, though finishing on the losing side in all of them; he had retired through injury by the time the club first claimed the trophy in 1910.

He played in the Home Scots v Anglo-Scots annual international trial match on four occasions, but despite his consistent success at club level was never selected for Scotland.
