= Abel Hughes =

Welsh footballer

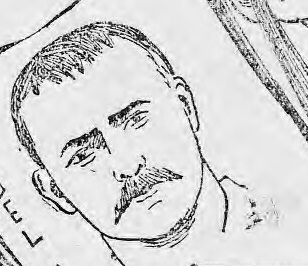

Personal information
- Date of birth: 20 October 1869
- Place of birth: Ruabon, Wales
- Date of death: 12 July 1946 (aged 76)
- Place of death: Stockport, England
- Height: 5 ft 11 in (1.80 m)
- Position: Full-back

Youth career
- -1894: Rhos

Senior career*
Years	Team	Apps	(Gls)
1894-1895	Liverpool FC	0	(0)
1895-	Rhos		

International career
1894	Wales	2	(0)
- * Club domestic league appearances and goals

Abel Hughes (20 October 1869 – 12 July 1946) was a Welsh international footballer. He was part of the Wales national football team, playing 2 matches. He played his first match on 12 March 1894 against England and his last match on 24 March 1894 against Scotland.

== Football ==
In May 1894, Hughes transferred from Rhos to Liverpool. He didn't play any first team games for Liverpool and transferred back to Rhos in January 1895.

== After football and death ==
Hughes was proprietor of the Nags Head Hotel, Rhosllanerchrugog and Moreton Inn, Johnstown.

He died in 1946 at 6 Acacia Avenue, Cheadle Hulme, Stockport.

He was buried at Rhos Cemetery on 15th August 1946.

== See also ==
- List of Wales international footballers (alphabetical)
