= Barney Mole =

English footballer

Personal information
- Full name: George Mole
- Date of birth: 1879
- Place of birth: Stockton-on-Tees, England
- Position: Winger

Senior career*
Years	Team	Apps	(Gls)
- Stockton St John's
1900	Newcastle United	1	(1)
1900–1901	Burnley	9	(2)
	South Bank	?	(?)
- * Club domestic league appearances and goals

George "Barney" Mole (1879 – after 1901) was an English professional footballer who played as a winger. He played ten matches in the Football League for Newcastle United and Burnley.
