= David Henderson (footballer) =

Scottish footballer

David Henderson (born November 1868) was a Scottish footballer who played as a striker. Henderson played for Liverpool during their first season in the English Football League in 1893–94 season. He made 23 appearances for the club, scoring 12 goals. At the end of the 1893–94 season he was let go by Liverpool and returned to Scotland to play for Partick Thistle.
