= Jimmy Munro (footballer, born 1870) =

Scottish footballer

Personal information
- Full name: James Munro
- Date of birth: 23 January 1870
- Place of birth: Dundee, Scotland
- Date of death: 4 January 1899 (aged 28)
- Place of death: Swindon, England
- Position: Inside forward

Senior career*
Years	Team	Apps	(Gls)
- Strathmore
1890–1893	Bolton Wanderers	50	(20)
1893–1895	Burton Swifts	54	(15)
1895–1899	Swindon Town	68	(15)
- * Club domestic league appearances and goals as of 16:28, 21 March 2010 (UTC)

James Munro (23 January 1870 – 4 January 1899) was a Scottish footballer who played at inside forward in the 1890s.

== Career ==
He played in The Football League for Bolton Wanderers and Burton Swifts, and later played for Swindon Town.

Whilst at Swindon he also played half back, centre half, full back and on one occasion played in goal. He was made club captain when Swindon turned professional and was first professional player to play for the team earning 35 shillings a week.

== Death ==
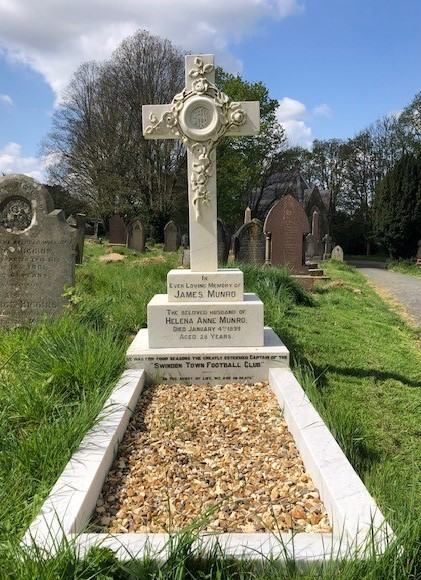
James Munro's restored memorial in Radnor Street cemetery, Swindon.

Munro died suddenly of meningitis on 4 January 1899. A few days before on New Year's Eve he had led Swindon in a 4–3 win against Tottenham in a Southern League match. Afterwards he was unwell and thought to have caught a cold, however he died shortly after. He was survived by his wife Helena Anne and five-month old daughter. Thousands turned out to watch his funeral procession which was led by the New Swindon Town Military Band and went from his home in Kent Road to the Trinity Presbyterian Church. He was buried in Radnor Street Cemerery in Swindon where a memorial was later erected. In 2021 a group of Swindon Town fans raised £1,500 to restore his memorial.
