= William Fulton (footballer, fl. 1897–1925) =

Scottish footballer

Personal information
- Full name: William Fulton
- Place of birth: Alva, Scotland
- Position: Inside left

Youth career
- Alva Albion Rovers

Senior career*
Years	Team	Apps	(Gls)
1897	Preston North End	0	(0)
1898–1900	Sunderland	26	(3)
1900–1901	Bristol City	25	(8)
1901–1902	Derby County	13	(1)
1911–1925	Alloa Athletic	??	(??)
- * Club domestic league appearances and goals

William Fulton born in Alva, Scotland was a Scottish footballer who played as an inside left. He made 39 Football League appearances scoring 4 goals and 25 Southern League appearances scoring 8 goals in the years before the First World War. Fulton also played for Alloa Athletic in Scotland.

== Career ==
William Fulton played locally for Alva Albion Rovers and had a trial with Preston North End. After turning professional in 1898 Fulton played two seasons for Sunderland in Division One before moving south to play in the Southern League for Bristol City in 1900–01. This was his most prolific scoring period in England with 8 goals. Fulton returned to Division One football with Derby County for a single season before returning to Scotland in 1902 playing with Alloa Athletic in Scottish non league football as Alloa did not enter the Scottish League until 1921.

== Honours ==
with Bristol City

- Southern Football League runners up: 1900–01
