= Dave Gardner (footballer) =

Scottish footballer

Personal information
- Full name: David Richmond Gardner
- Date of birth: 31 March 1873
- Place of birth: Glasgow, Scotland
- Date of death: 5 November 1931 (aged 58)
- Place of death: Leicester, England
- Height: 5 ft 8 in (1.73 m)
- Position: Left-back

Senior career*
Years	Team	Apps	(Gls)
1894–1899	Third Lanark	50	(1)
1899–1902	Newcastle United	76	(2)
1902–1904	Grimsby Town		
1904–1907	West Ham United	80	(0)
1907–?	Croydon Common		

International career
1897	Scotland	1	(0)
- * Club domestic league appearances and goals

David Richmond Gardner (31 March 1873 – 5 November 1931) was a Scottish footballer, who played as a left-back.

Born in Glasgow, Gardner started his footballing career with Third Lanark before moving south to play for Newcastle United and Grimsby Town. In 1904 he joined West Ham United. Gardner made his West Ham debut on 1 September 1904 in a 3–0 home win against Millwall. He played 80 games without scoring before joining Croydon Common in 1907. He died in 1931.

== International career ==
Gardner played a single game for Scotland, in a 2–2 draw against Wales on 20 March 1897.
