= Douglas Dick (footballer) =

Scottish footballer (1868–1940)

Personal information
- Full name: Douglas Charles Dick
- Date of birth: 9 July 1868
- Place of birth: Kirktonholm, Kilmarnock, Scotland
- Date of death: 24 June 1940 (aged 71)
- Place of death: Kilmarnock, Scotland
- Position: Outside right

Senior career*
Years	Team	Apps	(Gls)
1891–1892	Morton		
1892	Rangers	2	(1)
1892–1893	Morton	2	(0)
1893	Third Lanark	1	(0)
1893–1894	Liverpool	11	(2)
1894–1896	Morton	2	(0)
- * Club domestic league appearances and goals

Douglas Charles Dick (9 July 1868 – 24 June 1940) was a Scottish footballer who played as a striker. Dick was a regular in the Liverpool team during the 1893–94 season. He played 11 games during the season scoring twice. Before joining Liverpool he played for Rangers and Morton.

== Career ==
Dick signed for Morton in August 1891, before moving to Rangers the following year. He made 2 league appearances and scored 1 goal in the 1892–93 season. He moved back to Morton before the end of the season. He made 2 league appearances in the 1893–94 season for Morton. The first was on 16 September, in which he scored the only goal of the game against Port Glasgow Athletic, and the second on 30 September, a game in which he got into a fight with John McPherson of Cowlairs, and both players left the pitch of their own accord, without being ordered to by the referee. Soon after, Dick signed for Third Lanark and made 1 appearance, on 14 October 1893. Dick actually signed for Liverpool the day before this match, but was illegible to play until 20 October. He made his debut on 28 October against Woolwich Arsenal and went to make a further 10 league appearances for Liverpool, scoring 2 goals. At the end of the 1893–94 season, Dick moved back to Morton, but did not play until the 1895–96 season, in which he made 2 appearances.

After retiring, Dick was director of Kilmarnock for 10 years and was also chairman of the club in 1931 and 1932. He was also head of a motor company, Dick Brothers (Motors) Ltd, and died on 24 June 1940 at the age of 71.
