= Albert Worgan =

English footballer (1871–1920)

Albert Worgan (1871–1920) was an English footballer who played as a striker. Worgan was primarily an amateur footballer in his early career and played for Liverpool during their inaugural season in 1892–93. He signed professional terms in the next season and made his debut for the Liverpool first team against Burton Swifts scoring two goals. He made one further appearance for Liverpool before he left the club.
