= Thomas Blyth (footballer) =

English footballer

Personal information
- Full name: Thomas Hope Blyth
- Date of birth: 16 October 1876
- Place of birth: Seaham Harbour, England
- Date of death: 16 December 1949 (aged 73)
- Position: Centre forward

Senior career*
| Years | Team | Apps | (Gls) |
- Durham University
| 1896–1898 | Newcastle United | 1 | (1) |
- * Club domestic league appearances and goals

Thomas Hope Blyth (16 October 1876 – 16 December 1949) was an English footballer who scored on his only appearance in the Football League for Newcastle United. He played as a centre forward.

== Personal life ==
Blyth worked as a schoolmaster. He served as a bombardier and a signaller in the Royal Garrison Artillery during the First World War.

== Career statistics ==
Appearances and goals by club, season and competition
| Club | Season | League | | | FA Cup | | Total | |
| Club | Season | Division | Apps | Goals | Apps | Goals | Apps | Goals |
|---|---|---|---|---|---|---|---|---|
| Newcastle United | 1896–97 | Second Division | 1 | 1 | 0 | 0 | 1 | 1 |
| Career total | | | 1 | 1 | 0 | 0 | 1 | 1 |
