= Fred Kirkham (football) =

English football referee (died 1949)

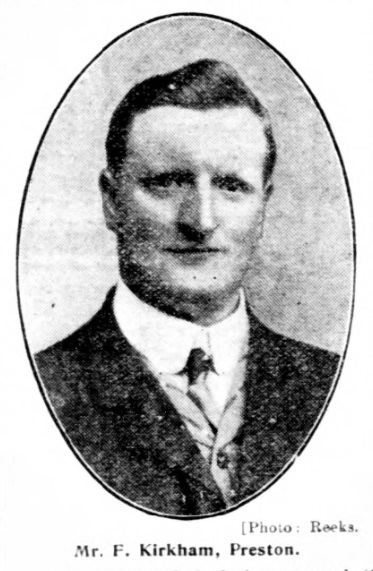
- Full name: Frederick Thomas Kirkham
- Died: 1949

Domestic
Years	League	Role
1903–1913	International football	Referee
1907–1908	Tottenham Hotspur	Manager

Frederick Thomas Kirkham (died 1949) was an English domestic and international football referee, and briefly the football manager for Tottenham Hotspur between 1907 and 1908.

== Career as referee ==
Kirkham was a well-known domestic referee who also had a job as a commercial traveller. He took charge of the 1906 FA Cup Final. He had also taken charge of 11 "A" International matches between 1903 and 1907, including Wales vs. Scotland on 9 March 1903, and was considered in the top three of world referees. Other Scotland matches he refereed were against Ireland on 26 March 1904 and Wales on 6 March 1905

Fred Kirkham also refereed a match between Belgium and Netherlands on 9 March 1913.

Despite claims to the contrary, he did not referee the 1902 FA Cup Final - this was Tom Kirkham from Burslem.

== Career as football manager ==
Just one week after refereeing a Southern League match between Spurs and Watford he was a surprise appointment as manager of Tottenham Hotspur on 22 April 1907. The club's history records that "He was not a success as a manager, unpopular with players and fans alike and it was no surprise when, after the settlement of his contract, he resigned in 1908." (27 July). His record as a manager is recorded as: played 52, won 25, drew 8 and lost 19.
