= Billy Smith (footballer, born 1873) =

Scottish footballer

Personal information
- Full name: William Smith
- Date of birth: 28 July 1873
- Place of birth: Bridgeton, Glasgow, Scotland
- Date of death: 1914 (aged 40–41)
- Position: Inside forward

Senior career*
Years	Team	Apps	(Gls)
1892–1893	Campsie Black Watch		
1893–1897	Hibernian	67	(37)
1897–1899	Newcastle United	15	(4)
1899–1901	Swindon Town	53	(16)
Total		135	(57)
- * Club domestic league appearances and goals

William Smith (28 July 1873 – 1914) was a Scottish footballer who played in the Football League for Newcastle United.
