= Jack Carr (footballer, born 1878) =

English footballer and manager (1878–1948)

Personal information
- Full name: John Thomas Carr
- Date of birth: 7 October 1878
- Place of birth: Seaton Burn, England
- Date of death: 17 March 1948 (aged 69)
- Place of death: Newcastle upon Tyne, England
- Positions: Left half; left back

Senior career*
Years	Team	Apps	(Gls)
1897–1899	Seaton Burn		
1899–1912	Newcastle United	279	(5)

International career
1905–1907	England	2	(0)

Managerial career
- 1920: Denmark
- 1922–1926: Blackburn Rovers
- * Club domestic league appearances and goals

John Thomas Carr (7 October 1878 – 17 March 1948) was an English professional footballer with Newcastle United between 1899 and 1912, playing at full back, he made 279 appearances, scoring 5 goals.

== Career ==
Carr won three League Championships and the FA Cup with Newcastle in this successful period of the club's history.

He made two appearances for England, both against Ireland, in a 1–1 draw on 25 February 1905 and in a 1–0 victory on 16 February 1907.

In 1912, he became a trainer at Newcastle United and would fill this position for the next 10 years. He eventually left the club when Blackburn Rovers made him their manager in 1922. Carr was the coach of the Danish national side at the 1920 Summer Olympics football competition in Antwerp.

== Personal life ==
Carr served as a corporal in the Army Service Corps during the First World War.

== Honours ==
Newcastle United

- First Division champions: 1904–05, 1906–07, 1908–09
- FA Charity Shield winner: 1909
- FA Cup winner: 1910

== Bibliography ==
- Paul Joannou. A Complete Who's Who of Newcastle United.
- Paul Joannou, Tommy Canning and Patrick Canning. Haway The Lads, The Illustrated Story of Newcastle United.
