= John Givens (footballer) =

Scottish footballer

John Givens (born January 1870) was a Scottish footballer who played as a striker.
