= Duncan McLean (footballer, born 1868) =

Scottish footballer (1868–1941)

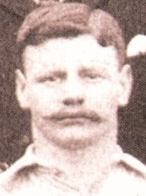
- Duncan McLean in 1892

Personal information
- Date of birth: 20 January 1868
- Place of birth: Renton, Scotland
- Date of death: 17 November 1941 (aged 73)
- Place of death: Renton, Scotland
- Position: Left-back

Youth career
- Renton Union

Senior career*
Years	Team	Apps	(Gls)
1889–1890	Renton	5	(0)
1890–1892	Everton	25	(0)
1892–1895	Liverpool	73	(6)
1895–1899	St Bernard's	41	(0)

International career
1896–1897	Scotland	2	(0)
- * Club domestic league appearances and goals

Duncan McLean (20 January 1868 – 17 November 1941) was a Scottish footballer who played for Renton, Everton, Liverpool, St Bernard's and Scotland in the latter years of the 19th century.

== Club career ==
McLean played for Renton Union and Renton, before signing for Everton in 1890 when the Dunbartonshire club were expelled from the Scottish Football League for matters relating to professionalism. He played a bit part in their first league title triumph in the following season. The departure of Andrew Hannah to Renton that summer gave McLean his chance to establish himself as the regular first choice right back at the club, although the club were unable to repeat the form of the previous year, finishing fifth. A summer of off the field turmoil followed in which directors, staff and players alike were forced to choose sides in a rent dispute over Anfield Road, which saw the club literally split in two.

Everton moved out, along with the vast majority of their players, staff and officials, but McLean was one of only two first-teamers who chose to stay and help form the new club, Liverpool. His decision may have been a reaction to the news that Andrew Hannah was on his way back to Merseyside, which could have signalled McLean's drop back into the reserves but as fate would have it Hannah also chose the new club over his former employers with the result that Hannah and McLean became Liverpool's first ever back line partnership. At Liverpool he helped to form part of the famous "Team of the Macs", playing left-back in the first side to ever represent the Anfield club in a Lancashire League fixture, an 8–0 victory over Higher Walton on 3 September 1892, they went on to win the title and were duly elected to the Football League Second Division in 1893.

McLean was also a member of the first Liverpool line-up in a Football League fixture away to Middlesbrough Ironopolis, a game which they won 2–0. They remained unbeaten and also beat Newton Heath (who became Manchester United in 1902), in the promotion test match. McLean, the club's penalty taker, scored five goals during the promotion campaign. His fortunes, along with Liverpool's, took a downward dip as the Reds were relegated straight back down to the lower tier at the end of the 1894–95 season.

McLean left Anfield in 1895 moving to Edinburgh side St Bernard's where he ended his career.

== International career ==
While with St Bernard's, McLean played for Scotland twice. His debut came on 21 March 1896 against Wales in a British Championship match at Carolina Port, Dundee, which Scotland won 4–0. His second match was on 27 March 1897 against Ireland at Ibrox Park, Glasgow, which Scotland won 5-1.

His younger brother Andrew was also a professional footballer with Renton among other clubs.

== Honours ==
Everton

- Football League: champions 1890–91

Liverpool

- Football League Second Division: champions 1893–94
