= Patrick Gordon (footballer) =

Scottish footballer

Patrick Gordon (born 19 February 1870) was a Scottish footballer who played as a midfielder for Liverpool in The Football League. Before playing for Liverpool, Gordon played for their local rivals Everton F.C., he was signed by Liverpool in 1893. Gordon played during the club's first season in the Football League in 1893–94, appearing in 21 of the team's 28 games scoring six goals. He played in the first five matches of the following season before he was transferred to Blackburn Rovers F.C. He replaced James Haydock in the starting line-up and scored two goals in the twelve games he played before his contract was terminated for "refractory conduct."
