= Robert McDermid =

Scottish footballer

Personal information
- Full name: Robert McDermid
- Position: Right back

Senior career*
Years	Team	Apps	(Gls)
1890	Accrington		
1891	Burton Swifts		
1892	Stockton		
1892–1893	Lincoln City	2	(0)
1893–1894	Renton	18	(0)
1894	Dundee Wanderers	5	(1)
1894–1897	Newcastle United	64	(2)
- * Club domestic league appearances and goals

Robert McDermid was a Scottish professional footballer who played as a full back.

McDermid played in Lincoln City's last two matches of their opening Football League campaign before moving back to Scotland and eventually playing for Newcastle United.
