= Patrick O'Brien (footballer, born 1875) =

Scottish footballer

Personal information
- Date of birth: June 1873
- Date of death: 1950
- Position(s): Forward

Patrick O'Brien (June 1873 – 1950) was a Scottish footballer.

O'Brien started his career playing junior football in the Glasgow, playing for Elm Park and Glasgow Northern, before making the move south to join London side Woolwich Arsenal in 1894. A forward, he made his debut against Grimsby Town on 10 September 1894 and went on to score 11 goals in 27 games for Woolwich Arsenal in his first season (1894–95), as Woolwich Arsenal finished 8th in the Second Division.

An injury at the start of the 1895–96 season ruled O'Brien out for four months, hampering his goal tally. However, he came back the next season, 1896–97, scoring 14 goals in 26 league appearances, making him the club's top scorer that season. However, despite this, he was sold to Bristol City in the summer of 1897, linking up with former Arsenal boss Sam Hollis, who had also just moved there. In total he played 67 times for Arsenal, scoring 29 goals.

He spent five years with Bristol City before seeing out his career with Swindon Town, making a single appearance for the Robins in 1902–03. He died in 1950.
