= Colin McLatchie =

Scottish footballer

Colin Campbell McLatchie (c. 1878 – 7 January 1952) was a Scottish footballer who played for Sunderland as a winger. He made his Sunderland debut on 5 November 1898 against Wolverhampton Wanderers in a 2–0 defeat at the Molineux Stadium. He won the 1902 English Football League Championship while with Sunderland. In total, he made 121 league appearances and scored 31 goals. McLatchie later played with Grimsby Town and Preston North End.
