= Bob Foyers =

Scottish footballer

- Foyer in 1895

Personal information
- Date of birth: 22 June 1868
- Place of birth: Hamilton, Scotland
- Date of death: 16 August 1942 (aged 74)
- Place of death: Glasgow, Scotland
- Position: Full-back

Youth career
- Hamilton Palace Colliery

Senior career*
Years	Team	Apps	(Gls)
- Burnbank Swifts
1890–1891	Heart of Midlothian	1	(0)
1891–1895	St Bernard's	23	(1)
1895–1897	Newcastle United	34	(0)
1897	St Bernard's	0	(0)
1897–1898	Clyde	4	(0)
1901	Hamilton Academical	2	(0)

International career
1892	Scottish Alliance XI	1	(0)
1893–1894	Scotland	2	(0)
- * Club domestic league appearances and goals

Robert Foyers (22 June 1868 – 16 August 1942) was a Scottish footballer who played as a full-back. He played professionally for various clubs in Scotland and for Newcastle United in England, and was capped for Scotland at Junior and Senior levels.

== Career ==
Born in Hamilton, Foyers joined local Junior side Burnbank Swifts from Palace Colliery and won back to back Scottish Junior Cup titles in 1889 and 1890. He was also one of four Swifts players to play in the first ever Scottish Junior international fixture against England on 11 May 1889.

After initially stepping up to Edinburgh club Heart of Midlothian in 1890, it was after switching to St Bernard's that Foyers' form earned him firstly a representative appearance for the Scottish Football Alliance XI against the rival Scottish Football League in 1892, followed by two caps for Scotland, both against Wales, in 1893 and 1894. He also lifted the Scottish Cup as St Bernard's defeated Renton in the 1894–95 final.

Foyers signed for Newcastle United in 1895 for a fee of £100 and was appointed club captain, but was disciplined for off-field behaviour and left soon afterwards. He returned to St Bernard's in 1897 before ending his career with short spells at Clyde and Hamilton Academical.

A mechanical engineer to trade, Foyers died in August 1942 at the age of 74.
