= Joe Rogers (footballer, born 1876) =

English footballer

Personal information
- Full name: Joseph James Rogers
- Date of birth: July qtr. 1876
- Place of birth: Foleshill, Warwickshire, England
- Height: 5 ft 10 in (1.78 m)
- Positions: Forward; full back

Youth career
- Stoke United

Senior career*
Years	Team	Apps	(Gls)
1893–1894	Macclesfield	14	(10)
1894–1896	Southampton	15	(2)
1896–1898	Grimsby Town	53	(23)
1898–1901	Newcastle United	54	(10)
1901–1902	Preston North End	39	(11)

International career
1899	FA XI		
- * Club domestic league appearances and goals

Joseph James Rogers (born 1876) was an English professional footballer who played either as a forward or full back for Southampton, Grimsby Town and Newcastle United.

== Football career ==
Born in Foleshill, near Coventry (then in Warwickshire), Rogers was playing for Macclesfield when he was signed by Southampton in December 1894, midway through the inaugural Southern League season. Shortly after joining "the Saints" he scored ten goals in a friendly match against the Wiltshire Regiment, which was won 13–0 on a quagmire of a pitch at Southampton's Antelope Ground.

He made his first few league appearances at either centre forward or inside forward before Southampton's coaches persuaded him to play as a full back. In this position "his speed, control and kicking ability came in useful", but Rogers soon became unsettled on the south coast and moved to Grimsby Town in May 1896. In his two seasons with Southampton, he made 15 Southern League appearances, scoring twice.

He spent two seasons at Grimsby in the Football League Second Division scoring quite prolifically, reaching third place in the table in 1896–97. In these two seasons he played 53 league games, scoring 23 goals.

In 1898 he moved to Newcastle United who had just been promoted to the First Division. He made such an impression in Newcastle's first two First Division seasons that he was selected to join a FA tour of Germany, scoring five goals in one of the three matches in which he appeared. He was thus Newcastle's first "international" player.

He moved on to Preston North End in January 1901 for two seasons before taking up a coaching post in Germany. He subsequently returned to Grimsby where he joined Grimsby Town's coaching staff in 1906.
