= Billy Lindsay =

English footballer

Personal information
- Full name: William Lindsay
- Date of birth: 10 December 1872
- Place of birth: Stockton-on-Tees, England
- Date of death: 27 February 1933 (aged 60)
- Place of death: Luton, England
- Position: Full back

Youth career
- Stockton St. John's

Senior career*
Years	Team	Apps	(Gls)
- Stockton
1893–1894	Everton	9	(0)
1894–1898	Grimsby Town	106	(1)
1898–1900	Newcastle United	59	(1)
1900–1903	Luton Town		
1903–1907	Watford	59	(0)
1907	Luton Town		
1907–19xx	Hitchin Town		
- * Club domestic league appearances and goals

William Lindsay (10 December 1872 – 27 February 1933) was an English professional footballer. He played in the Football League for Everton, Grimsby Town and Newcastle United, as well as the Southern League for Luton Town and Watford, and captained the latter four clubs. During his first season at Watford, he was part of the team that won promotion as champions of the 1903–04 Southern League Second Division.

Lindsay's brother, Jimmy, was also a footballer who played for Bury against Derby County in the 1903 FA Cup Final; Bury won 6–0.
