= Tommy Ghee =

Scottish footballer

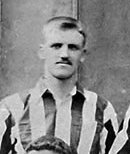

Personal information
- Full name: Thomas Ghee
- Date of birth: 1873
- Place of birth: Kilmarnock, Scotland
- Date of death: 1939 (aged 65–66)
- Position: Wing half

Senior career*
Years	Team	Apps	(Gls)
1893–1894	Kilmarnock		
1893–1894	Darwen	19	(0)
1894–1895	Kilmarnock		
1895–1897	St Mirren		
1897–1902	Newcastle United	130	(2)
Total		149	(2)
- * Club domestic league appearances and goals

Thomas Ghee (1873–1939) was a Scottish footballer who played in the Football League for Darwen and Newcastle United.
