= Charlie Watts (footballer) =

English footballer

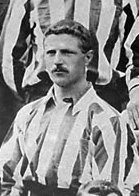

Personal information
- Full name: Charles Watts
- Date of birth: 1870
- Place of birth: Stockton-on-Tees, England
- Date of death: 23 November 1924 (aged 53–54)
- Place of death: Newcastle upon Tyne, England
- Position: Goalkeeper

Senior career*
| Years | Team | Apps | (Gls) |
| 1892–1893 | Middlesbrough Ironopolis | | |
| 1893–1894 | Blackburn Rovers | 9 | (0) |
| 1894–1896 | Burton Wanderers | 51 | (0) |
| 1896–1906 | Newcastle United | 89 | (0) |
| Total | | 149 | (0) |
- * Club domestic league appearances and goals

Charles Watts (1870 – 23 November 1924) was an English footballer who played in the Football League for Blackburn Rovers, Burton Wanderers and Newcastle United. In 1924, Watts stabbed his son before killing himself with a knife.
