= Jack Ostler =

Scottish footballer

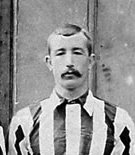

Personal information
- Full name: John Ostler
- Date of birth: 1873
- Place of birth: Newarthill, Scotland
- Date of death: 1956 (aged 82–83)
- Place of death: Prestonpans, Scotland
- Position: Centre half

Senior career*
Years	Team	Apps	(Gls)
1893–1894	Motherwell	6	(3)
1894–1895	Bury	15	(6)
1895–1896	Motherwell	19	(2)
1896–1900	Newcastle United	67	(3)
1900	Middlesbrough	3	(0)
Total		110	(14)
- * Club domestic league appearances and goals

John Ostler (1873–1956) was a Scottish footballer who played in the Scottish Football League for Motherwell and in the English Football League for Bury, Middlesbrough and Newcastle United.
