= Andy Aitken (footballer, born 1877) =

Scottish footballer (1877–1955)

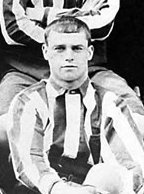

Personal information
- Date of birth: 27 April 1877
- Place of birth: Ayr, Scotland
- Date of death: 15 February 1955 (aged 77)
- Place of death: Newcastle upon Tyne, England
- Position: Wing half

Senior career*
Years	Team	Apps	(Gls)
1894–1895	Ayr Parkhouse		
1895–1906	Newcastle United	316	(33)
1906–1908	Middlesbrough	76	(1)
1909–1911	Leicester Fosse	64	(2)
1911–1912	Dundee	29	(0)
1912–1913	Kilmarnock	8	(0)

International career
1901–1911	Scotland	14	(0)

Managerial career
- 1906–1908: Middlesbrough
- 1909–1911: Leicester City
- ?: Gateshead Town
- * Club domestic league appearances and goals

Andrew Aitken (27 April 1877 – 15 February 1955) was a Scottish footballer who was one of the early game's most prominent players.

After playing for local Ayrshire sides, he signed for English Second Division club Newcastle United in 1895, then in only their third league season. He helped the club to promotion in 1898 and was a key member of the side as they established themselves in the First Division, captaining the Magpies from 1899 to 1905.

During his time at the club, Aitken – nicknamed 'Daddler' – helped them win their first League Championship in the 1904–05 season as well as appearing in two FA Cup Finals, both losses, in 1905 and 1906.

He left Newcastle United in November 1906 becoming player/manager at Middlesbrough, a role he also held at Leicester City (then known as Leicester Fosse) from 1909 until 1911.

He returned to Scotland to finish his playing career with Dundee and Kilmarnock, his career ending in January 1913 with a serious groin injury.

He was quickly appointed manager of Gateshead Town for a while before becoming a publican on Tyneside, where he resided until his death in 1955.

== See also ==
- List of Scotland national football team captains
