= Jimmy Stott =

English footballer (1870–1908)

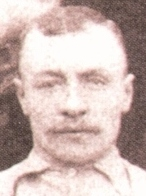

Personal information
- Full name: James Stott
- Date of birth: 6 November 1870
- Place of birth: Darlington, England
- Date of death: 8 October 1908 (aged 37)
- Place of death: Newcastle-upon-Tyne, England
- Position: Winger

Senior career*
Years	Team	Apps	(Gls)
1887–1889	South Bank		
1889–1890	Cambuslang		
1890–1892	South Bank		
1892–1893	Middlesbrough	0	(0)
1893–1894	Liverpool	15	(14)
1894–1895	Grimsby Town	29	(4)
1895–1899	Newcastle United	117	(9)
1899–1900	Middlesbrough	1	(0)
- * Club domestic league appearances and goals

James Stott (6 November 1870 – 8 October 1908) was an English professional footballer of the late 19th century.

== Career ==
Primarily a winger, but able to play in a number of positions, he began his career as an amateur with spells at South Bank, Cambuslang and Middlesbrough. In August 1893, Stott signed his first professional contract with Liverpool. He only had one season at Anfield, Liverpool's first in the Football League, but in doing so won the Second Division championship and ended as the club's top scorer with an impressive 14 goals in 17 games. Despite this, though, he was not a first team regular, and in 1894 he moved to Grimsby Town. His spell there was also ended after a year, returning to the north-east to join Newcastle United, where he captained the side to a shock FA Cup victory at Preston North End and promotion from the Second Division in 1898. After one year in the First Division he returned to Middlesbrough, but couldn't get into the first-team, and he retired early in 1900. Described as a snappy dresser, but with a short temper (on and off the pitch), he later worked as a licensee. He contracted a brain tumour, and died in a lunatic asylum in 1908.
