= 1924–25 Liverpool F.C. season =

English football club season

Liverpool F.C
1924–25 season
- Manager: Matt McQueen
- Stadium: Anfield
- Football League: 4th
- FA Cup: Fourth round
- Top goalscorer: League: Dick Forshaw (19); All: Dick Forshaw (19)

The 1924–25 Liverpool F.C. season was the 33rd season in existence for Liverpool.

== Squad statistics ==
=== Appearances and goals ===
No.	Pos	Nat	Player	Total		Division 1		FA Cup	
No.	Pos	Nat	Player	Apps	Goals	Apps	Goals	Apps	Goals
	FW	(England) ENG	Fred Baron	9	5	9	5	0	0
	MF	(England) ENG	Tom Bromilow	24	0	22	0	2	0
	MF	(Scotland) SCO	Billy Chalmers	2	0	2	0	0	0
	FW	(England) ENG	Harry Chambers	31	7	27	7	4	0
	DF	(England) ENG	Bill Cockburn	18	0	17	0	1	0
	MF	(England) ENG	Dick Forshaw	40	19	37	19	3	0
	DF	(England) ENG	Jimmy Garner	4	0	4	0	0	0
	MF	(England) ENG	Cyril Gilhespy	2	0	2	0	0	0
	MF	(England) ENG	Fred Hopkin	30	2	26	1	4	1
	FW	(England) ENG	Dick Johnson	11	1	11	1	0	0
	GK	(Wales) WAL	John Jones	4	0	4	0	0	0
	MF	(Scotland) SCO	Hector Lawson	2	0	2	0	0	0
	DF	(England) ENG	Ephraim Longworth	24	0	22	0	2	0
	DF	(England) ENG	Tommy Lucas	41	0	37	0	4	0
	DF	(Northern Ireland) NIR	Billy McDevitt	1	0	1	0	0	0
	DF	(Scotland) SCO	Donald McKinlay	30	4	28	4	2	0
	MF	(Scotland) SCO	Jock McNab	31	2	29	2	2	0
	DF	(Wales) WAL	Ted Parry	1	0	1	0	0	0
	MF	(Scotland) SCO	David Pratt	30	0	26	0	4	0
	MF	(England) ENG	Archie Rawlings	44	9	40	7	4	2
	GK	(Northern Ireland) NIR	Elisha Scott	42	0	38	0	4	0
	FW	(England) ENG	Tom Scott	6	1	6	1	0	0
	FW	(England) ENG	Danny Shone	46	15	42	12	4	3
	DF	(England) ENG	Walter Wadsworth	28	0	25	0	3	0
	FW	(England) ENG	Jimmy Walsh	5	3	4	3	1	0

== Table ==
Pos	Team	Pld	W	D	L	GF	GA	GAv	Pts
2	West Bromwich Albion	42	23	10	9	58	34	1.706	56
3	Bolton Wanderers	42	22	11	9	76	34	2.235	55
4	Liverpool	42	20	10	12	63	55	1.145	50
5	Bury	42	17	15	10	54	51	1.059	49
6	Newcastle United	42	16	16	10	61	42	1.452	48

Source: World Football
Rules for classification: 1) Points; 2) Goal average; 3) Goals scored
