= 1925–26 Liverpool F.C. season =

English football club season

Liverpool F.C
1925–26 season
- Manager: Matt McQueen
- Stadium: Anfield
- Football League: 7th
- FA Cup: Fourth round
- Top goalscorer: League: Dick Forshaw (27); All: Dick Forshaw (29)

The 1925–26 Liverpool F.C. season was the 34th season in existence for Liverpool.

== Squad statistics ==
=== Appearances and goals ===
No.	Pos	Nat	Player	Total		Division 1		FA Cup	
No.	Pos	Nat	Player	Apps	Goals	Apps	Goals	Apps	Goals
	FW	(England) ENG	Fred Baron	10	2	10	2	0	0
	MF	(England) ENG	Tom Bromilow	32	1	29	1	3	0
	FW	(England) ENG	Harry Chambers	45	17	42	17	3	0
	DF	(England) ENG	Bill Cockburn	40	0	37	0	3	0
	MF	(England) ENG	Dick Forshaw	35	29	32	27	3	2
	DF	(England) ENG	Jimmy Garner	1	0	1	0	0	0
	FW	(South Africa) RSA	Gordon Hodgson	12	4	12	4	0	0
	MF	(England) ENG	Fred Hopkin	33	1	33	1	0	0
	DF	(England) ENG	Jimmy Jackson	14	0	12	0	2	0
	DF	(England) ENG	Ephraim Longworth	6	0	4	0	2	0
	DF	(England) ENG	Tommy Lucas	40	0	39	0	1	0
	DF	(Scotland) SCO	Donald McKinlay	44	2	41	2	3	0
	MF	(Northern Ireland) NIR	Dave McMullan	13	0	10	0	3	0
	MF	(Scotland) SCO	Jock McNab	37	0	34	0	3	0
	MF	(England) ENG	Cyril Oxley	34	6	31	6	3	0
	MF	(Scotland) SCO	David Pratt	15	1	15	1	0	0
	MF	(England) ENG	Archie Rawlings	12	1	12	1	0	0
	FW	(Scotland) SCO	Tommy Reid	1	2	1	2	0	0
	GK	(South Africa) RSA	Arthur Riley	3	0	3	0	0	0
	GK	(Northern Ireland) NIR	Elisha Scott	42	0	39	0	3	0
	FW	(England) ENG	Tom Scott	5	1	4	1	1	0
	DF	(England) ENG	Bert Shears	2	0	2	0	0	0
	FW	(England) ENG	Danny Shone	3	0	3	0	0	0
	DF	(England) ENG	Walter Wadsworth	4	0	4	0	0	0
	FW	(England) ENG	Jimmy Walsh	12	3	12	3	0	0

== Table ==
Pos	Team	Pld	W	D	L	GF	GA	GAv	Pts
5	Sheffield United	42	19	8	15	102	82	1.244	46
6	Aston Villa	42	16	12	14	86	76	1.132	44
7	Liverpool	42	14	16	12	70	63	1.111	44
8	Bolton Wanderers	42	17	10	15	75	76	0.987	44
9	Manchester United	42	19	6	17	66	73	0.904	44

Source: World Football
Rules for classification: 1) Points; 2) Goal average; 3) Goals scored
