= 1921–22 Liverpool F.C. season =

English football club season

Liverpool FC
1921–22 season
- Manager: David Ashworth
- Stadium: Anfield
- First Division: Champions
- FA Cup: Second Round
- Top goalscorer: League: Harry Chambers (19); All: Harry Chambers (21)
Home colours	Away colours

== Squad statistics ==
=== Appearances and goals ===
The 1921–22 season was Liverpool's 30th season in existence, they went on to win their third league title. The club also reached the second round of the FA Cup before being knocked out by West Bromwich Albion.

No.	Pos	Nat	Player	Total		Division 1		FA Cup		Charity Shield	
No.	Pos	Nat	Player	Apps	Goals	Apps	Goals	Apps	Goals	Apps	Goals
	DF	(England) ENG	Jack Bamber	8	0	8	0	0	0	0	0
	FW	(Wales) WAL	Harry Beadles	12	6	11	6	0	0	1	0
	MF	(England) ENG	Tom Bromilow	44	2	40	2	3	0	1	0
	FW	(England) ENG	Harry Chambers	36	21	32	19	3	2	1	0
	MF	(England) ENG	Frank Checkland	5	0	5	0	0	0	0	0
	MF	(England) ENG	Willie Cunningham	1	0	1	0	0	0	0	0
	MF	(England) ENG	Dick Forshaw	46	20	42	17	3	3	1	0
	MF	(England) ENG	Cyril Gilhespy	2	1	2	1	0	0	0	0
	MF	(England) ENG	Fred Hopkin	46	0	42	0	3	0	1	0
	MF	(Republic of Ireland) IRL	Billy Lacey	43	1	39	1	3	0	1	0
	FW	(England) ENG	Harry Lewis	22	1	19	1	3	0	0	0
	DF	(England) ENG	Ephraim Longworth	27	0	26	0	0	0	1	0
	DF	(England) ENG	Tommy Lucas	30	2	27	2	3	0	0	0
	FW	(Wales) WAL	Billy Matthews	7	4	7	4	0	0	0	0
	DF	(Scotland) SCO	Donald McKinlay	33	1	29	1	3	0	1	0
	MF	(Scotland) SCO	Jock McNab	33	2	29	2	3	0	1	0
	GK	(Scotland) SCO	Frank Mitchell	3	0	3	0	0	0	0	0
	DF	(Wales) WAL	Ted Parry	7	0	7	0	0	0	0	0
	GK	(Northern Ireland) NIR	Elisha Scott	43	0	39	0	3	0	1	0
	FW	(England) ENG	Danny Shone	15	6	15	6	0	0	0	0
	MF	(England) ENG	Harold Wadsworth	1	0	1	0	0	0	0	0
	DF	(England) ENG	Walter Wadsworth	42	1	38	0	3	1	1	0

== Table ==
Pos	Team	Pld	W	D	L	GF	GA	GAv	Pts
1	Liverpool (C)	42	22	13	7	63	36	1.750	57
2	Tottenham Hotspur	42	21	9	12	65	39	1.667	51
3	Burnley	42	22	5	15	72	54	1.333	49
4	Cardiff City	42	19	10	13	61	53	1.151	48
5	Aston Villa	42	22	3	17	74	55	1.345	47

Source: World Football
Rules for classification: 1) Points; 2) Goal average; 3) Goals scored
(C) Champions
