= 1923–24 Liverpool F.C. season =

English football club season

Liverpool F.C
1923–24 season
- Manager: Matt McQueen
- Stadium: Anfield
- Football League: 12th
- FA Cup: Fourth round
- Top goalscorer: League: Jimmy Walsh (16); All: Jimmy Walsh (19)

The 1923–24 Liverpool F.C. season was the 32nd season in existence for Liverpool.

== Squad statistics ==
=== Appearances and goals ===
No.	Pos	Nat	Player	Total		Division 1		FA Cup	
No.	Pos	Nat	Player	Apps	Goals	Apps	Goals	Apps	Goals
	DF	(England) ENG	Jack Bamber	6	0	6	0	0	0
	FW	(Wales) WAL	Harry Beadles	2	0	2	0	0	0
	MF	(England) ENG	Tom Bromilow	32	0	27	0	5	0
	FW	(England) ENG	Harry Chambers	35	17	30	13	5	4
	MF	(England) ENG	Dick Forshaw	44	6	39	5	5	1
	MF	(England) ENG	Cyril Gilhespy	5	0	5	0	0	0
	MF	(England) ENG	Fred Hopkin	38	0	33	0	5	0
	FW	(England) ENG	Dick Johnson	2	0	2	0	0	0
	FW	(England) ENG	Joe Keetley	9	3	9	3	0	0
	MF	(Republic of Ireland) IRL	Billy Lacey	9	0	8	0	1	0
	MF	(Scotland) SCO	Hector Lawson	14	0	10	0	4	0
	DF	(England) ENG	Ephraim Longworth	14	0	14	0	0	0
	DF	(England) ENG	Tommy Lucas	33	0	28	0	5	0
	DF	(Northern Ireland) NIR	Billy McDevitt	3	0	3	0	0	0
	DF	(Scotland) SCO	Donald McKinlay	44	6	39	6	5	0
	MF	(Scotland) SCO	Jock McNab	34	0	30	0	4	0
	DF	(Wales) WAL	Ted Parry	3	0	3	0	0	0
	MF	(Scotland) SCO	David Pratt	15	0	15	0	0	0
	MF	(England) ENG	Archie Rawlings	11	0	11	0	0	0
	GK	(Northern Ireland) NIR	Elisha Scott	47	0	42	0	5	0
	FW	(England) ENG	Danny Shone	16	5	15	5	1	0
	MF	(England) ENG	Harold Wadsworth	17	0	17	0	0	0
	DF	(England) ENG	Walter Wadsworth	42	0	37	0	5	0
	FW	(England) ENG	Jimmy Walsh	42	19	37	16	5	3

== Table ==
Pos	Team	Pld	W	D	L	GF	GA	GAv	Pts
10	Notts County	42	14	14	14	44	49	0.898	42
11	Manchester City	42	15	12	15	54	71	0.761	42
12	Liverpool	42	15	11	16	49	48	1.021	41
13	West Ham United	42	13	15	14	40	43	0.930	41
14	Birmingham	42	13	13	16	41	49	0.837	39

Source: World Football
Rules for classification: 1) Points; 2) Goal average; 3) Goals scored
