= 1920–21 Liverpool F.C. season =

English football club season

Liverpool F.C
1920–21 season
- Manager: David Ashworth
- Stadium: Anfield
- Football League: 4th
- FA Cup: Second round
- Top goalscorer: League: Harry Chambers (22); All: Harry Chambers (24)

The 1920–21 Liverpool F.C. season was the 29th season in existence for Liverpool.

== Squad statistics ==
=== Appearances and goals ===
No.	Pos	Nat	Player	Total		Division 1		FA Cup	
No.	Pos	Nat	Player	Apps	Goals	Apps	Goals	Apps	Goals
	DF	(England) ENG	Jack Bamber	33	1	30	1	3	0
	MF	(England) ENG	Tom Bromilow	43	0	40	0	3	0
	FW	(England) ENG	Harry Chambers	43	24	40	22	3	2
	MF	(England) ENG	Willie Cunningham	2	0	2	0	0	0
	MF	(England) ENG	Dick Forshaw	27	9	27	9	0	0
	MF	(England) ENG	Chris Harrington	4	0	4	0	0	0
	FW	(England) ENG	Dick Johnson	27	13	26	13	1	0
	MF	(Ireland) EIR	Billy Lacey	24	2	22	1	2	1
	FW	(England) ENG	Harry Lewis	20	2	17	2	3	0
	DF	(England) ENG	Ephraim Longworth	24	0	24	0	0	0
	DF	(England) ENG	Tommy Lucas	32	0	29	0	3	0
	FW	(Wales) WAL	Billy Matthews	1	0	1	0	0	0
	DF	(Scotland) SCO	Donald McKinlay	38	2	35	2	3	0
	MF	(England) ENG	Peter McKinney	3	1	3	1	0	0
	MF	(Scotland) SCO	Jock McNab	1	0	1	0	0	0
	GK	(Scotland) SCO	Harry McNaughton	1	0	1	0	0	0
	FW	(Scotland) SCO	Tom Miller	4	3	4	3	0	0
	GK	(Scotland) SCO	Frank Mitchell	15	0	15	0	0	0
	DF	(Wales) WAL	Ted Parry	2	0	2	0	0	0
	MF	(England) ENG	Albert Pearson	13	0	10	0	3	0
	DF	(Scotland) SCO	Jim Penman	1	0	1	0	0	0
	GK	(Ireland) EIR	Elisha Scott	29	0	26	0	3	0
	MF	(England) ENG	Jackie Sheldon	38	1	35	1	3	0
	MF	(England) ENG	Harold Wadsworth	25	3	25	3	0	0
	DF	(England) ENG	Walter Wadsworth	45	5	42	5	3	0

== Table ==
Pos	Team	Pld	W	D	L	GF	GA	GAv	Pts
2	Manchester City	42	24	6	12	70	50	1.400	54
3	Bolton Wanderers	42	19	14	9	77	53	1.453	52
4	Liverpool	42	18	15	9	63	35	1.800	51
5	Newcastle United	42	20	10	12	66	45	1.467	50
6	Tottenham Hotspur	42	19	9	14	70	48	1.458	47

Source: World Football
Rules for classification: 1) Points; 2) Goal average; 3) Goals scored
