= 1926–27 Liverpool F.C. season =

English football club season

Liverpool F.C
1926–27 season
- Manager: Matt McQueen
- Stadium: Anfield
- Football League: 9th
- FA Cup: Fifth round
- Top goalscorer: League: Harry Chambers (17); All: Harry Chambers (21)

The 1926–27 Liverpool F.C. season was the 35th season in existence for Liverpool.

== Squad statistics ==
=== Appearances and goals ===
No.	Pos	Nat	Player	Total		Division 1		FA Cup	
No.	Pos	Nat	Player	Apps	Goals	Apps	Goals	Apps	Goals
	FW	(England) ENG	Fred Baron	1	0	1	0	0	0
	MF	(England) ENG	Tom Bromilow	44	0	40	0	4	0
	FW	(England) ENG	Harry Chambers	46	21	42	17	4	4
	DF	(England) ENG	Bill Cockburn	9	0	9	0	0	0
	FW	(Scotland) SCO	Willie Devlin	1	1	1	1	0	0
	DF	(England) ENG	Bob Done	2	0	2	0	0	0
	MF	(England) ENG	Dick Edmed	42	7	38	6	4	1
	MF	(England) ENG	Dick Forshaw	27	14	24	14	3	0
	FW	(South Africa) RSA	Gordon Hodgson	40	18	36	16	4	2
	MF	(England) ENG	Fred Hopkin	40	1	36	0	4	1
	DF	(England) ENG	Jimmy Jackson	19	0	19	0	0	0
	DF	(England) ENG	Ephraim Longworth	15	0	15	0	0	0
	DF	(England) ENG	Tommy Lucas	43	1	39	1	4	0
	DF	(Scotland) SCO	Donald McKinlay	32	1	28	1	4	0
	MF	(Northern Ireland) NIR	Dave McMullan	2	0	2	0	0	0
	MF	(Scotland) SCO	Jock McNab	33	0	29	0	4	0
	MF	(England) ENG	George Pither	6	0	6	0	0	0
	MF	(Scotland) SCO	David Pratt	18	0	14	0	4	0
	FW	(Scotland) SCO	Tommy Reid	21	12	20	12	1	0
	GK	(South Africa) RSA	Arthur Riley	10	0	10	0	0	0
	GK	(Northern Ireland) NIR	Elisha Scott	36	0	32	0	4	0
	FW	(England) ENG	Tom Scott	4	1	4	1	0	0
	DF	(England) ENG	Bert Shears	8	0	8	0	0	0
	FW	(England) ENG	Jimmy Walsh	7	0	7	0	0	0

== Table ==
Pos	Team	Pld	W	D	L	GF	GA	GAv	Pts
7	Leicester City	42	17	12	13	85	70	1.214	46
8	Sheffield United	42	17	10	15	74	86	0.860	44
9	Liverpool	42	18	7	17	69	61	1.131	43
10	Aston Villa	42	18	7	17	81	83	0.976	43
11	Arsenal	42	17	9	16	77	86	0.895	43

Source: World Football
Rules for classification: 1) Points; 2) Goal average; 3) Goals scored
