= 1922–23 Liverpool F.C. season =

English football club season

Liverpool FC
1922–23 season
- Manager: David Ashworth; Matt McQueen
- Stadium: Anfield
- First Division: Champions
- FA Cup: Third round
- FA Charity Shield: Runners-up
- Top goalscorer: League: Harry Chambers (22); All: Harry Chambers (25)
Home colours	Away colours

The 1922–23 season was Liverpool's 31st season in existence, they went on to retain the title, it was their fourth league title overall. The club also reached the third round of the FA Cup before being knocked out 2–1 by Sheffield United.

== Squad statistics ==
=== Appearances and goals ===
No.	Pos	Nat	Player	Total		Division 1		FA Cup	
No.	Pos	Nat	Player	Apps	Goals	Apps	Goals	Apps	Goals
	DF	(England) ENG	Jack Bamber	4	0	4	0	0	0
	FW	(Wales) WAL	Harry Beadles	4	0	4	0	0	0
	MF	(England) ENG	Tom Bromilow	45	3	41	3	4	0
	FW	(England) ENG	Harry Chambers	43	25	39	22	4	3
	MF	(England) ENG	Dick Forshaw	46	20	42	19	4	1
	MF	(England) ENG	Cyril Gilhespy	10	2	10	2	0	0
	MF	(England) ENG	Fred Hopkin	44	1	40	1	4	0
	FW	(England) ENG	Dick Johnson	41	16	37	14	4	2
	MF	(Republic of Ireland) IRL	Billy Lacey	34	1	30	1	4	0
	DF	(England) ENG	Ephraim Longworth	45	0	41	0	4	0
	DF	(England) ENG	Tommy Lucas	1	0	1	0	0	0
	DF	(Scotland) SCO	Donald McKinlay	46	6	42	5	4	1
	MF	(Scotland) SCO	Jock McNab	43	1	39	1	4	0
	MF	(Scotland) SCO	David Pratt	7	0	7	0	0	0
	FW	(England) ENG	Jack Sambrook	2	0	2	0	0	0
	GK	(Northern Ireland) NIR	Elisha Scott	46	0	42	0	4	0
	FW	(England) ENG	Danny Shone	1	0	1	0	0	0
	MF	(England) ENG	Harold Wadsworth	3	0	3	0	0	0
	DF	(England) ENG	Walter Wadsworth	41	2	37	2	4	0

== Table ==
Pos	Team	Pld	W	D	L	GF	GA	GAv	Pts
1	Liverpool (C)	42	26	8	8	70	31	2.258	60
2	Sunderland	42	22	10	10	72	54	1.333	54
3	Huddersfield Town	42	21	11	10	60	32	1.875	53
4	Newcastle United	42	18	12	12	45	37	1.216	48
5	Everton	42	20	7	15	63	59	1.068	47

Source: World Football
Rules for classification: 1) Points; 2) Goal average; 3) Goals scored
(C) Champions
