= McNab =

McNab, MacNab, Macnab, MacNabb or Mac-Nab is a surname. Notable people with the surname include:

- Alex McNab, Scottish-US soccer player and coach
- Sir Allan MacNab, 1st Bt (1798–1862), Canadian military and political leader
- Andrew McNab (born 1984), Canadian ski mountaineer
- Andy McNab (born 1959), British novelist
- Archibald McNab (1826–1924), Canadian politician
- Archibald Peter McNab (1864–1945), Canadian politician
- Bob McNab (born 1943), English football player
- Buzz McNab, fictional character
- Chica Macnab (1889–1980), Scottish artist
- Claire McNab (1940–2022), Australian writer
- Colin McNab (born 1961), British chess Grandmaster
- Colin McNab (footballer) (1902–1970), Scottish footballer
- David McNab (disambiguation)
- Donovan McNabb (born 1976), NFL quarterback
- Dougie McNab (born 1956), Scottish footballer
- Duncan McNab (1820–1896), missionary
- Frank McNab (died 1878), member of the Lincoln County Regulators
- James McNab, first settler in Norval, Ontario
- James McNab (botanist) (1810–1878), horticulturist and botanist
- James Charles Macnab of Macnab (1926–2013), 23rd chief of Clan Macnab
- Jim McNab (1940–2006), footballer
- Jock McNab (1894–1949), footballer
- Malcolm McNab, session musician
- Max McNab (1924–2007), Canadian ice hockey player, coach, and NHL General Manager
- Mercedes McNab (born 1980), Canadian actress
- Michael A. McNab, Judge (born 1975), St. Bernard Parish Justice of The Peace for Ward F in Louisiana
- Michael McNab, founder and Executive Chairman of McNab construction
- Neil McNab (born 1957), Scottish footballer
- Peter McNab (1952–2022), Canadian ice hockey player
- Robert McNab (1864–1917), New Zealand politician
- Sam McNab (1926–1995), Scottish professional footballer
- Sandy McNab (1911–1962), Scottish footballer
- Thomas McNab (1849–1929), Canadian alderman
- Tom McNab (1933–2006), New Zealand footballer
- William McNab (engineer) (1855–1923) Canadian engineer
- William Ramsay McNab (1844–1929) Scottish botanist

== See also ==
- McNab/Braeside, Ontario, township in Canada
- McNab, Arkansas, town in Hempstead County, United States
- McNabs Island, island in Halifax Harbour, Canada
- Clan MacNab, Scottish clan
- McNab (dog), dog breed
- John Macnab, novel by John Buchan
- McNabb, surname
