= William McNab =

William McNab may refer to:

- William Ramsay McNab (1844–1889), Scottish physician and botanist
- William McNab (engineer) (1855–1923), railway engineer
- William McNab (footballer) (1870–?), Scottish footballer
