= David Pratt (footballer) =

Scottish footballer and manager

Personal information
- Date of birth: 5 March 1896
- Place of birth: Lochore, Fife, Scotland
- Date of death: 28 July 1967 (aged 71)
- Place of death: Edinburgh, Scotland
- Height: 5 ft 10 in (1.78 m)
- Positions: Defender; outside left

Youth career
- Lochore Welfare

Senior career*
Years	Team	Apps	(Gls)
- Lochgelly United
- Hearts of Beath
1919–1921	Celtic	21	(0)
1921–1923	Bradford City	50	(5)
1923–1927	Liverpool	77	(1)
1927–1929	Bury	51	(0)
- Yeovil Town

Managerial career
- 1929–1933: Yeovil Town
- 1933–1934: Clapton Orient
- 1935: Notts County
- 1935–1937: Heart of Midlothian
- 1937: Bangor City
- 1944–1945: Port Vale
- * Club domestic league appearances and goals

David Pratt (5 March 1896 – 28 July 1967) was a Scottish football player and manager. His career encompassed time spent in both England and Scotland, as well as a spell in Wales.

As a player, he was used both as a defender and as a midfielder on the outside left. He started his career at Celtic in 1919 before moving to England two years later to play for Bradford City. In 1923 he moved on to Liverpool, where he would remain for the next four years. He then ended his playing career after spells with Bury and Yeovil Town.

He got his break in management with Yeovil Town in 1929 before being installed as Clapton Orient manager in 1933. His reign was to only last one year, and he spent a spell in 1935 as Notts County manager before he returned to Scotland later in the year to manage Heart of Midlothian. He left Hearts in 1937 and was appointed manager at Bangor City, though he lost his position before the end of the year. His final role was as Port Vale between 1944 and 1945, though he never actually took charge of a game for the "Valiants".

== Playing career ==
Pratt began his playing career during the last years of World War I with a series of local Fife sides, namely Lochore Welfare, Lochgelly United and Hearts of Beath. He joined Celtic from the latter in June 1919 and made his debut several months later, in a home game with Falkirk. His versatility counted against him, though, and he never developed into a first-team regular at Celtic Park. Indeed, although later primarily considered a defender, the position he appeared in most frequently for Celtic was outside left.

In 1921, Pratt moved south, joining Bradford City, where his consistent performances earned him a move to Liverpool two years later. He spent four seasons on Merseyside, but as with his time at Celtic, he could not attain a regular first-team berth. His most consistent run in the first-team occurred in 1924–25, while his only goal for the club was recorded during a 6–3 defeat of Newcastle United the following season. He joined Bury in 1927 before moving further south to Yeovil Town.

== Managerial career ==
Pratt eventually became manager of Yeovil before assuming control of Yeovil & Petters United in 1929. This was to be his longest period in charge of one club, the rest of his coaching career characterised by short tenures in managerial positions. Between May and December 1933, he managed Clapton Orient, then he had two months in charge of Notts County in the spring of 1935. He then returned to Scotland, where he replaced Willie McCartney as Heart of Midlothian manager. He lasted two seasons in Edinburgh before moving to Wales with Bangor City, where he stayed until the outbreak of World War II. He served in the RAF during the conflict before taking his final managerial role with Port Vale in December 1944, a position he vacated six months later. He failed to gain a release from the Air Force and so never managed to be a manager to the Vale other than in name only.

== Career statistics ==
=== Playing statistics ===
Appearances and goals by club, season and competition
Club	Season	League			FA Cup		Total	
Club	Season	Division	Apps	Goals	Apps	Goals	Apps	Goals
Bradford City	1921–22	First Division	27	1	5	0	32	1
Bradford City	1922–23	Second Division	23	4	0	0	23	4
Bradford City	Total		50	5	5	0	55	5
Liverpool	1922–23	First Division	7	0	0	0	7	0
Liverpool	1923–24	First Division	15	0	0	0	15	0
Liverpool	1924–25	First Division	26	0	4	0	30	0
Liverpool	1925–26	First Division	15	1	0	0	15	1
Liverpool	1926–27	First Division	14	0	4	0	18	0
Liverpool	Total		77	1	8	0	85	1
Bury	1927–28	First Division	26	0	3	0	29	0
Bury	1928–29	First Division	25	0	3	0	28	0
Bury	Total		51	0	6	0	57	0
Career total			178	6	19	0	197	6

=== Managerial statistics ===
Managerial record by team and tenure
Team	From	To	Record				
Team	From	To	P	W	D	L	Win %
Clapton Orient	31 May 1933	30 December 1934	72	27	16	29	37.5
Notts County	29 April 1935	28 June 1935	1	0	0	1	0.0
Total			73	27	16	30	37.0
