= David McNab =

David McNab may refer to:

- David McNab (ice hockey) (born 1955), assistant general manager of the Anaheim Ducks
- David T. McNab (born 1947), Métis historian
- David McNab (footballer), footballer for Fulham
