= William Chalmers =

William Chalmers may refer to:

- William Chalmers (merchant) (1748–1811), Swedish merchant whose bequest founded the Chalmers University of Technology
- William W. Chalmers (1861–1944), U.S. Representative from Ohio
- William Chalmers (1880s footballer) (died 1940), Scottish footballer
- William Chalmers (banker), interim CEO of Lloyds Banking Group
- William Chalmers (footballer, born 1901) (1901–1997), Scottish footballer (Liverpool, Tranmere Rovers, St Johnstone)
- William Chalmers (footballer, born 1912) (1912–1943), Scottish footballer (Raith Rovers, Bournemouth, Barrow)
- William Chalmers (ice hockey) (1934–1994), hockey player
- William Chalmers Burns (1815–1868), Scottish missionary to China
- William Chalmers (bishop) (1833–1901), Anglican Bishop of Goulburn
- William Scott Chalmers (1888–1971), admiral in the Royal Navy

== See also ==
- Billy Chalmers (1907–1980), Scottish football player and manager
- Stewart Chalmers (William Stewart Chalmers, 1907–1989), Scottish footballer
