= List of Southport F.C. seasons =

Southport Football Club is an English association football club based in Southport, Merseyside who currently play in the National League North. This list details the club's achievements in senior league and cup competitions, and the top scorers for each season where known.

Southport Central were formed in 1881 and played their first association football match on 12 November of that year against Bootle. Originally a rugby union side the club switched codes after suffering a succession of heavy defeats. The club became founder members of The Central League in 1911. In 1918, the club was renamed as Southport Vulcan – having been bought by the Vulcan Motor Company – becoming the first club to take a sponsor's name. In 1919, the sponsorship from Vulcan ended thus meaning a final name change, this time to Southport. In 1921, all first teams playing in the Central League became founder members of the newly formed Football League Third Division North including Southport, with the Central League becoming a league for Football League reserve teams.

== Statistics ==
- Seasons in Football Conference/Conference National: 17
- Seasons in Conference North: 4
- Seasons in Football League Third Division: 4
- Seasons in Football League Third Division North: 30
- Seasons in Football League Fourth Division: 16
- Seasons in Lancashire League 14
- Seasons in Lancashire Combination Division One: 7
- Seasons in Lancashire Combination Division Two: 1
- Seasons in Northern Premier League: 16
- Seasons in The Central League: 6
- Seasons in Football League Lancashire Section, Northern Group Principal Competition: 1
- Seasons in Football League Lancashire Section, Northern Group Principal Competition Group A: 3

== Key ==
Division shown in bold when it changes due to promotion, relegation or league reorganisation. Top scorer shown in bold when he set or equalled a club record.

Key to league record:

- P – Played
- W – Games won
- D – Games drawn
- L – Games lost
- F – Goals for
- A – Goals against
- Pts – Points
- Pos – Final position

Key to colours and symbols:

1st or W	Winners
2nd or RU	Runners-up
↑	Promoted
↓	Relegated
♦	Top league scorer in Southport's division

- Conf = Football Conference
- Conf Nat = Conference National
- Conf Nor = Conference North
- Div 3 = Football League Third Division
- Div 3 N = Football League Third Division North
- Div 4 = Football League Fourth Division
- Lancs = Lancashire League
- Lancs C1 = Lancashire Combination Division One
- Lancs C2 = Lancashire Combination Division Two
- NPL = Northern Premier League
- TCL = The Central League
- FLLS = Football League Lancashire Section, Northern Group Principal Competition
- FLLSA = Football League Lancashire Section, Northern Group Principal Competition Group A.
- QR1 = First Qualifying Round
- QR2 = Second Qualifying Round
- QR3 = Third Qualifying Round
- QR4 = Fourth Qualifying Round
- QR5 = Fifth Qualifying Round
- QR6 = Sixth Qualifying Round
- R1 = Round 1
- R2 = Round 2
- R3 = Round 3
- R4 = Round 4
- R5 = Round 5
- QF = Quarter-finals
- SF = Semi-finals
- RU = Runners-up
- C = Champions

== Seasons ==
Season	League									FA Cup	League Cup^{[A]}	Other competitions		Top scorer^{[B]}		Average attendance	References
Season	Division	P	W	D	L	F	A	Pts	Pos	FA Cup	League Cup^{[A]}	Other competitions		Name	Goals	Average attendance	References
1882–83										R1							
1883–84										R1							
1884–85										R3							
1885–86										R1							
1888–89										QR2							
1889–90	Lancs^{[C]}	24	9	7	8	40	32	25	6th								
1890–91	Lancs	20	8	3	9	43	55	19	6th								
1891–92	Lancs	22	12	3	7	58	47	27	5th								
1892–93	Lancs	22	7	2	13	33	44	16	8th								
1893–94	Lancs	22	13	0	9	57	42	36	3rd								
1894–95	Lancs	26	14	4	8	68	43	32	4th	R1							
1895–96	Lancs	30	17	4	9	72	51	38	4th								
1896–97	Lancs	28	16	2	10	84	51	34	4th								
1897–98	Lancs	26	13	3	10	51	41	29	7th								
1898–99	Lancs	24	12	8	4	41	18	32	2nd	QR5							
1899–1900	Lancs	28	14	5	9	49	32	33	7th	QR5							
1900–01	Lancs	20	15	3	2	49	15	33	2nd^{[D]}	QR5							
1901–02	Lancs	24	16	4	4	56	25	36	2nd	QR5							
1902–03	Lancs	22	17	2	3	49	18	36	1st↑	QR5							
1903–04	Lancs C2^{[E]}	34	23	6	5	82	30	52	1st↑	QR5							
1904–05	Lancs C1	34	17	8	9	59	41	42	3rd								
1905–06	Lancs C1	38	11	10	17	70	96	32	17th	QR4							
1906–07	Lancs C1	38	14	13	11	50	50	41	9th	QR5							
1907–08	Lancs C1	38	18	7	13	64	63	43	6th								
1908–09	Lancs C1	38	13	8	17	61	67	34	14th								
1909–10	Lancs C1	38	13	7	18	61	67	33	18th								
1910–11	Lancs C1	38	11	15	12	55	61	37	11th								
1911–12	TCL^{[F]}									R1							
1912–13	TCL	38	12	6	20	44	76	30	15th								
1913–14	TCL	38	10	10	18	43	58	30	17th								
1914–15	TCL	38	10	6	22	42	68	26	19th	QR3							
1915–16	FLLS^{[G]}	26	9	6	11	41	41	24	9th								
1916–17	FLLSA^{[H]}	30	10	8	12	40	43	28	9th								
1917–18	FLLSA	30	8	6	16	33	69	22	13th								
1918–19	FLLSA	30	15	3	12	49	53	33	6th								
1919–20	TCL^{[I]}	42	15	6	21	71	76	36	16th								
1920–21	TCL	42	13	6	23	68	99	32	18th								
1921–22	Div 3 N^{[J]}	38	14	10	14	55	44	38	9th	R1				Billy Glover	26		
1922–23	Div 3 N	38	12	7	19	32	46	31	17th	QR5				Billy Glover	7		
1923–24	Div 3 N	42	16	14	12	44	42	46	7th	QR6				Jack Sibbald	13		
1924–25	Div 3 N	42	22	7	13	59	37	51	4th	QR6				Jack Sambrook	17		
1925–26	Div 3 N	42	11	10	21	62	92	32	20th	R3				Jack Sambrook	14		
1926–27	Div 3 N	42	15	9	18	80	85	39	12th	R4				Harry Beadles	20		
1927–28	Div 3 N	42	20	6	17	79	70	45	8th	R4				Harry Beadles	23		
1928–29	Div 3 N	42	16	8	18	75	85	40	12th	R2				Harry Beadles	18		
1929–30	Div 3 N	42	15	13	14	81	74	43	9th	R1				Jimmy Cowen	24		
1930–31	Div 3 N	42	22	9	11	88	56	53	5th	QF^{[K]}				Archie Waterston	31		
1931–32	Div 3 N	40	18	10	12	58	53	46	7th	R4				Archie Waterston	13		
1932–33	Div 3 N	42	17	7	18	70	67	41	12th	R4				Jack Appleby	13		
1933–34	Div 3 N	42	8	17	17	63	90	33	18th	R1		Football League Third Division North Cup	R1	Jack Diamond	20		
1934–35	Div 3 N	42	10	12	20	55	85	32	21st	R1		Football League Third Division North Cup	R1	Ray Worswick	18		
1935–36	Div 3 N	42	11	9	22	48	90	31	21st	R1		Football League Third Division North Cup	R3	Tommy Savage	12		
1936–37	Div 3 N	42	12	13	17	73	87	37	14th	R2		Football League Third Division North Cup	RU	Joe Patrick	29		
1937–38	Div 3 N	42	12	14	16	53	82	38	16th	R1		Football League Third Division North Cup	W	Joe Patrick	20		
1938–39	Div 3 N	42	20	10	12	75	54	50	4th	R3				Joe Patrick	27		
The Football League and FA Cup were suspended until after the Second World War.
1946–47	Div 3 N	42	7	11	24	53	85	25	21st	R1				Harry Hawkins	17		
1947–48	Div 3 N	42	14	11	17	60	63	39	15th	R1				Cec Wyles	25		
1948–49	Div 3 N	42	11	9	22	45	64	31	21st	R3				Cec Wyles	12		
1949–50	Div 3 N	42	12	13	17	51	71	37	16th	R3				Cec Wyles	8		
1950–51	Div 3 N	46	13	10	23	56	72	36	21st	R2				Jimmy Nuttall	22		
1951–52	Div 3 N	46	15	11	20	53	71	41	17th	R2				Jack Lindsay	15		
1952–53	Div 3 N	46	20	12	15	63	60	51	6th	R2				Jack Billingham	16		
1953–54	Div 3 N	46	17	12	17	63	60	46	11th	R2				Jack Billingham; Colin McLean	11		
1954–55	Div 3 N	46	16	16	14	47	44	48	11th	R1				William Holmes	12		
1955–56	Div 3 N	46	23	11	12	66	53	57	5th	R2				George Bromilow	22		
1956–57	Div 3 N	46	10	12	24	52	94	32	22nd	R1				George Bromilow; Jimmy McDermott	8		
1957–58	Div 3 N	46	11	6	29	52	88	28	23rd	R1				Ray Gryba	9		
1958–59	Div 4^{[L]}	46	7	12	27	41	86	26	24th	R1				Jimmy McDermott	11		
1959–60	Div 4	46	10	14	22	48	92	34	21st	R1				Eddie Moss	12		
1960–61	Div 4	46	19	6	21	69	67	44	14th	R3	R1			Reg Blore	15		
1961–62	Div 4	44	17	9	18	61	71	43	17th	R3	R1			Jimmy Blain	20		
1962–63	Div 4	46	15	14	17	72	106	44	13th	R1	R2			Jimmy Blore	20		
1963–64	Div 4	46	15	9	22	58	89	32	20th	R2	R1			Alan Spence	27		
1964–65	Div 4	46	8	16	22	58	89	32	20th	R3	R1			Alex Russell	16		
1965–66	Div 4	46	18	12	16	68	69	48	10th	R5	R1			Alan Spence	18		
1966–67	Div 4	46	23	13	10	69	42	59	2nd↑	R1	R1			Alan Spence	13		
1967–68	Div 3	46	17	12	17	65	65	46	14th	R3	R1			Terry Harkin	21		
1968–69	Div 3	46	17	13	16	71	64	47	8th	R2	R2			George Andrews	19		
1969–70	Div 3	46	14	10	22	48	66	38	22nd↓	R1	R2			Tony Field	16		
1970–71	Div 4	46	21	6	19	63	57	48	8th	R1	R1			Eric Redrobe	12		
1971–72	Div 4	46	18	14	66	14	46	50	7th	R1	R2			Eric Redrobe	12		
1972–73	Div 4	46	26	10	10	71	48	62	1st↑	R1	R2			Andy Provan	21		
1973–74	Div 3	46	6	16	24	35	82	28	23rd↓	R1	R1			Andy Provan	7		
1974–75	Div 4	46	15	17	14	56	56	47	11th	R1	R1			Paul Taylor	12		
1975–76	Div 4	46	8	10	28	41	77	26	23rd	R1	R2			Keith Galley	9		
1976–77	Div 4	46	3	19	24	33	77	25	23rd	R1	R1			Alan Wilson	6		
1977–78	Div 4	46	6	19	21	52	76	31	23rd^{[M]}	R1	R2			Phil Ashworth	9		
1978–79	NPL	44	19	14	11	62	49	52	5th	R1				John Gerrard; Terry Nolan; John Beesley	8	579	
1979–80	NPL^{[N]}	42	8	13	21	30	75	29	19th	QR4		FA Trophy	R2	Steve Woodcock	5	291	
1980–81	NPL	42	11	11	20	42	68	33	20th	QR1		FA Trophy	QR3	Vin Dobie; Paul Birchall	5	237	
1981–82^{[O]}	NPL	42	16	14	12	63	55	46	8th	QR1		FA Trophy	QR1	Gary Cooper	21	417	
1982–83	NPL	42	11	14	17	58	65	47	15th	QR1		FA Trophy	QR3	Gary Cooper	15	299	
1983–84	NPL	42	14	8	20	57	74	50	16th	QR3		FA Trophy	QR2	Joe Strong	10	311	
1984–85	NPL	42	15	9	18	65	66	54	12th	QR2		FA Trophy	QR2	Andy Mutch	21	308	
1985–86	NPL	42	17	11	14	70	66	62	6th	QR3		FA Trophy	R3	John Coleman	15	323	
1986–87	NPL	42	19	11	12	67	49	68	8th	R1		FA Trophy	R1	John Coleman	25	316	
1987–88	NPL	42	15	12	45	43	48	57	14th	QR1		FA Trophy	RQ3	John Coleman	9	385	
1988–89	NPL	42	13	12	17	66	52	51	14th	R1		FA Trophy	QR1	Clint Neysmith	13	359	
1989–90	NPL	42	17	14	11	54	48	65	7th	QR4		FA Trophy	QR1	Steve Holden	12	304	
1990–91	NPL	40	18	14	8	66	48	68	5th	QR2		FA Trophy	QR1	Steve Holden	20	455	
1991–92	NPL	42	16	17	9	57	48	65	7th	QR2		FA Trophy	R2	Jimmy Blackhurst	12	365	
1992–93	NPL	42	29	9	4	103	31	96	1st↑	R2		FA Trophy	QR3	Steve Haw	31	1025	
1993–94	Conf	42	18	12	12	57	51	66	4th	QR4		FA Trophy	R3	David Gamble	15	1293	
1994–95	Conf	42	21	9	12	68	50	72	3rd	R1		FA Trophy	R1	David Gamble; Steve Haw	12	1078	
1995–96	Conf	42	18	12	12	77	64	66	6th	QR4		FA Trophy	R1	Andy Whittaker	16	944	
1996–97	Conf	42	15	10	17	51	61	55	11th	R1		FA Trophy	R2	Andy Whittaker	19	970	
1997–98	Conf	42	13	11	18	56	58	50	16th	R1		FA Trophy	RU^{[P]}	Andy Whittaker	8	1055	
1998–99	Conf	42	10	15	17	47	59	45	18th	R3		FA Trophy	QF	Lee Elam	7	1158	
1999–2000	Conf	42	15	13	14	55	56	58	9th	R1		FA Trophy	QF	Ian Arnold	14	1307	
2000–01	Conf	42	20	9	13	58	46	69	4th	R2		FA Trophy	QF	Ian Arnold; Simon Parke	13	1423	
2001–02	Conf	42	13	14	15	53	49	53	15th	R1		Football League Trophy FA Trophy	R1(N) ^{[Q]} R3	Simon Parke	16	1048	
2002–03	Conf	42	11	12	19	54	69	45	21st↓	R2		Football League Trophy FA Trophy	R1(N)^{[R]} R5	Peter Thomson	12	1161	
2003–04	NPL	44	20	10	14	71	52	70	6th↑^{[S]}	QR2		FA Trophy	R2	Neil Robinson	14	809	
2004–05	Conf Nor	42	25	9	8	83	45	84	1st↑	R1		FA Trophy	R3	Terry Fearns	33♦	1004	
2005–06	Conf Nat	42	10	10	22	36	68	40	18th	R1		FA Trophy	R1	Steve Daly	12	1244	
2006–07	Conf Nat	46	11	14	21	57	67	47	23rd↓	QR4		FA Trophy	R2	Carl Baker	11	1200	
2007–08	Conf Nor	42	22	11	9	77	50	77	4th^{[T]}	QR4		FA Trophy	R1	Tony Gray	19	1014	
2008–09	Conf Nor	42	21	13	8	63	36	76	5th	QR3		FA Trophy	QF	Ciaran Kilheeney	16	899	
2009–10	Conf Nor	40	25	11	4	91	45	86	1st↑^{[U]}	R1		FA Trophy	R1	Steve Daly	18	924	
2010–11	Conf Nat	46	11	13	22	56	77	46	21st^{[V]}	R1		FA Trophy	R1	Shaun Whalley	8	1152	
2011–12	Conf Nat	46	21	13	12	72	69	76	7th	R1		FA Trophy	R1	Tony Gray	24	1290	
2012–13	Conf Nat	46	14	12	20	72	86	54	20th	QR4		FA Trophy	QF	Chris Almond; Karl Ledsham	12	958	
2013–14	Conf Nat	46	14	11	21	53	71	53	18th	R1		FA Trophy	R1	Danny Hattersley	9	1049	
2014–15	Conf Nat	46	13	12	21	47	72	51	19th	R3		FA Trophy	R1			1070	
2015–16	National	46	14	13	19	52	65	55	16th	QR3		FA Trophy	R2				
2016–17	National	46	10	9	27	52	97	39	23rd↓	R1		FA Trophy	R2				
2017–18	National N	42	14	8	20	60	72	50	15th	QR2		FA Trophy	QR3				
2018–19	National N	42	13	14	15	58	55	53	14th	R2		FA Trophy	R1				
2019–20	National N	32	12	7	13	40	41	43	12th	QR4		FA Trophy	R2				
2020–21	National N	14	4	4	6	16	19	16	17th	QR3		FA Trophy	R5				
2021–22	National N	42	14	15	13	60	55	57	11th	QR4		FA Trophy	R4				
2022–23	National N	46	13	11	22	50	62	50	18th	QR2		FA Trophy	R2				
2023–24	National N	46	16	8	22	54	75	56	17th	QR2		FA Trophy	R3				
2024–25	National N	46	13	14	19	43	58	53	18th	QR3		FA Trophy	R4				
2025–26	National N	46	16	12	18	64	71	60	14th	QR4		FA Trophy	SF				

== Notes ==
A.: The League Cup competition started in the 1960–61 season.
B.: Includes goals only scored in league games (including play-offs).
C.: Founder members of the Lancashire League.
D.: Equal points as 1st place team but lost on goal average.
E.: Joined Lancashire Combination as founder members of new Division 2.
F.: Following a disagreement with the Lancashire Combination, Southport joined forces with other disgruntled teams and formed The Central League.
G.: Central League suspended due to outbreak of the First World War. Southport competed in the Football League Lancashire Section, Northern Group Principal Competition.
H.: Leagues reorganised again. Southport competed in the Football League Lancashire Section, Northern Group Principal Competition Group A.
I.: The Central League resumed after the war.
J.: Southport were founder members of the Football League Third Division North.
K.: Southport became the first Third Division North club to reach the quarter-finals in 1931, losing away at Everton 9–1.
L.: A new Fourth Division was created in 1958 along with a new Third Division by merging the regionalised Third Division North and Third Division South.
M.: Southport were subjected to a re-election vote by other league clubs after having finished in the bottom four and were duly voted out of the football league and into the Northern Premier League.
N.: With the formation of the Alliance Premier League (officially called Football Conference from 1986), the Northern Premier League dropped down one level in the English football league system and became a feeder league to the Alliance.
O.: The 1981–82 season saw the introduction of three points for a win.
P.: Southport's first appearance in the final of a major knockout cup competition, which was a 1–0 defeat to Cheltenham Town. It is also the first time Southport have played at Wembley.
Q.: The 2001–02 edition of the Football League Trophy saw 8 Football Conference sides (Top four Northern teams and four Southern) playing in the competition. As a result of Southport being the highest placed northern team by finishing 4th in the 2000–2001 season they qualified for the competition for the 2001–02 season.
R.: The 2002–03 edition of the Football League Trophy saw 12 Football Conference teams playing in the competition. Despite Southport finishing the 2001–2002 season in 15th place they qualified due to most of the teams who finished above being geographically southern.
S.: Formation of the Conference North and Conference South divisions for the 2004–05 season saw the top 13 teams from the Northern Premier League promoted to form the new divisions alongside teams from the Southern League and the Isthmian League.
T.: Southport lost in the play-off semi-final to Stalybridge Celtic on penalties after finishing 2–2 on aggregate.
U.: Farsley Celtic were removed out of the division with their results being expunged.
V.: Rushden & Diamonds were expelled from the Conference National on 11 June 2011. This decision was made due to their unstable financial position, meaning they could not guarantee being able to complete all their fixtures in the 2011–12 season, Southport, as the highest placed relegated team were thus reprieved.
