= McNabb =

McNabb is a Scottish surname. Notable people with the surname include:

- Brayden McNabb (born 1991), Canadian ice hockey player for the Vegas Golden Knights
- Carl McNabb (1917–2007), baseball player
- Charles H. McNabb (died 1955), American politician from Maryland
- Chet McNabb (1920–1990), American professional basketball player
- D. Paul McNabb (died 1963), American politician
- Donald McNabb (1870–1934), Canadian politician
- Donovan McNabb (born 1976), former American football quarterback
- Duncan McNabb (born 1952), US Air Force general
- Edgar McNabb (1865–1894), baseball player
- Ian McNabb (born 1960), British musician
- J. Martin McNabb (1847–1926), American politician
- James McNabb (c. 1776–1820), Upper Canadian businessman and political figure
- James Alexander MacNabb (1901–1990), British rower
- Juan Conway McNabb (1925–2016), Catholic bishop
- Ross McNabb (1934–1972), New Zealand mycologist
- Sean McNabb (born 1965), American musician (bassist)
- Vincent McNabb (1868–1943), Irish scholar and priest

Fictional Characters

- Colin McNabb, a character in Agatha Christie's novel Hickory Dickory Dock

== See also ==
- Clan MacNab, a Scottish clan
- McNabb, Illinois, a village in the United States
- McNab (disambiguation)
