= David McNab (footballer) =

English footballer

Personal information
- Date of birth: 2 December 1897
- Place of birth: Cleland, Scotland
- Height: 5 ft 11 in (1.80 m)
- Position: Full back

Youth career
- Cleland Juniors

Senior career*
Years	Team	Apps	(Gls)
- Newarthill Thistle
1923–1925	Portsmouth		
1925–1930	Fulham	158	(21)
1930–1931	Coventry City	9	(0)
- Llanelly
- * Club domestic league appearances and goals

David McNab (2 December 1897 – unconfirmed) was a Scottish footballer who played as a defender for Portsmouth, Fulham and Coventry City. He played in 158 matches in the Football League for Fulham (169 in all competitions), scoring 21 goals, between 1925 and 1930. He joined Coventry in summer 1930 for a fee of £500, and made nine appearances for the club. He also played for Newarthill Thistle, Llanelly, and Walton-on-Thames.

His older brother Jock played for Liverpool and was capped once for Scotland. The siblings faced each other when Fulham beat Liverpool 3–1 in the 1925–26 FA Cup Fourth Round; they were later in opposition in the Third Division South after Jock joined Queens Park Rangers.

== See also ==
- List of Scottish football families
