= 1921–22 Bradford City A.F.C. season =

English football club season

The 1921–22 Bradford City A.F.C. season was the 15th in the club's history.

The club finished 21st in Division One, and reached the 2nd round of the FA Cup. The club were relegated to Division Two after spending 10 seasons in Division One.

== Sources ==
- Frost, Terry (1988). Bradford City A Complete Record 1903-1988. Breedon Books Sport. ISBN 0-907969-38-0.
