= James McNab (botanist) =

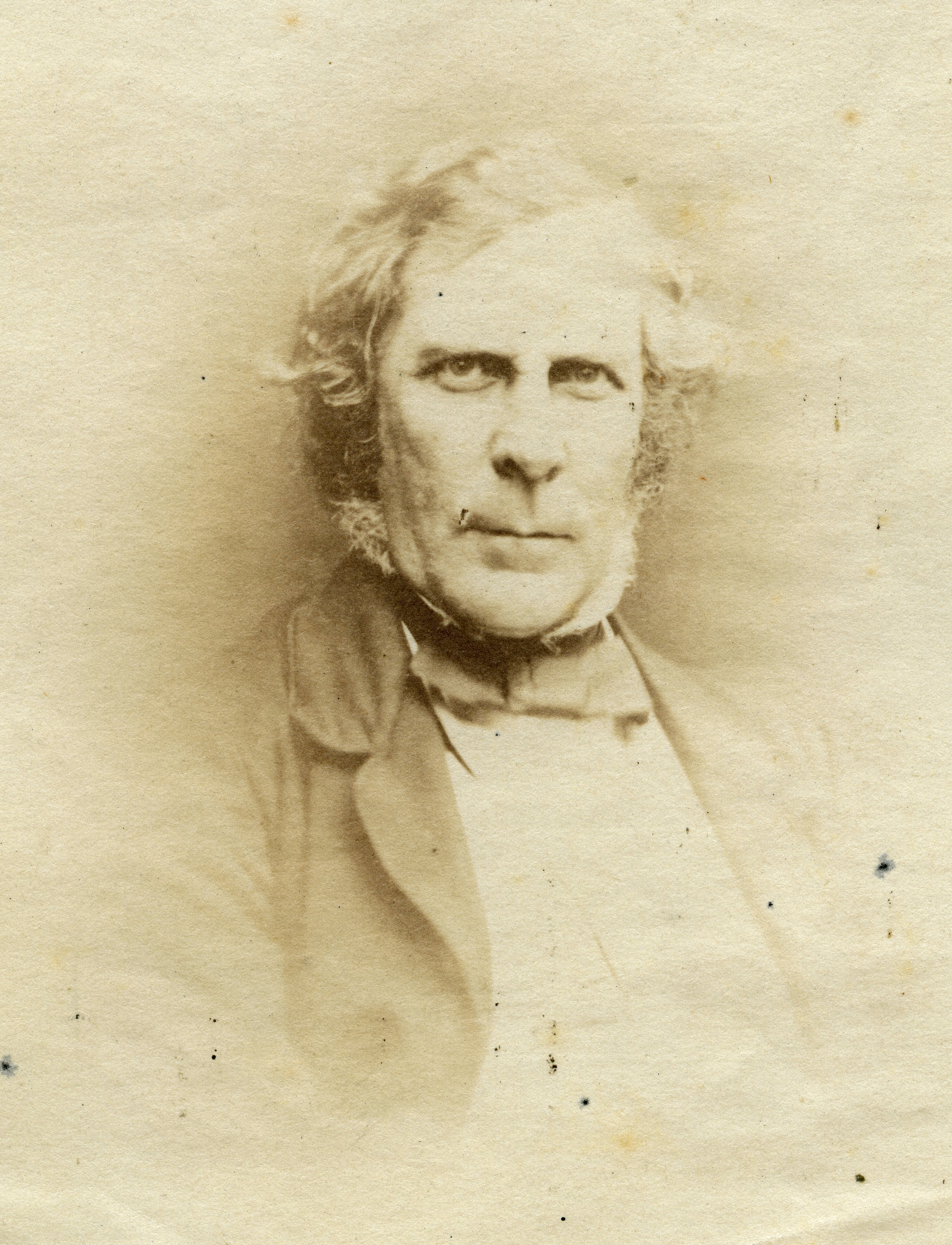
Carte-de-visite, c. 1865

James McNab (25 April 1810 – 19 November 1878) was a British horticulturist, artist, and botanist. He was the son of William McNab (1780–1848) and the father of William Ramsay McNab (1844–1889). In 1848 he became curator of the Royal Botanic Garden Edinburgh, succeeding his father. He maintained careful notes on the flowering of plants in Edinburgh and foresaw possible changes in timing due to climatic changes.

== Life and work ==
McNab was born in Richmond Surrey, the eldest son of the Scottish foreman at the Royal Botanic Gardens, Kew, William McNab (1780–1848), and Elizabeth née Whiteman (c. 1777–1844). The family moved to Edinburgh when William McNab became curator at the Royal Botanic Garden in 1810, having worked at Kew from 1801. He was offered the position of principal gardener by Daniel Rutherford on the recommendation of Joseph Banks. Like his father, James, worked as an apprentice from 1822 while also studying at the Dollar Institution in 1827-28. In 1829 he became an assistant to Patrick Neill of the Caledonian Horticultural Society. He was artistically inclined and produced drawings of plants including some that were published in the 1830s for descriptions made by Robert Graham. In 1834 he went on a tour of the US and Canada with the nurseryman Robert Brown and brought many new plants into Scotland. In 1835 he became curator of the garden of the Caledonian Horticultural Society in Inverleith. In 1844 he married Margaret, daughter of Peter Scott, and they would have six children including William Ramsay McNab who became a professor of botany. Following the death of his father in 1848, he was made curator of the Royal Botanic Garden, Edinburgh, in 1849. He was involved in organizing the temperate plant house and its heating system in 1858. He maintained a careful register of the flowering of the plants there and saw changes which he saw as being due to changing climate, in this case, the end of the Little Ice Age. He died suddenly in the garden in 1878 and is buried in Warriston cemetery. Cupressus macnabiana and Saxifraga x macnabiana (a hybrid) were named after him. His documents, paintings and herbarium specimens were transferred to the National Botanic Gardens in Dublin through his son.
