= William Cunningham (footballer) =

English footballer

William Cunningham (27 October 1894 – 28 June 1934) was an English footballer who played as a wing half; he made three appearances for Liverpool and also played for Blyth Spartans, Barrow and Mid-Rhondda.

== Club career ==
=== Blyth Spartans ===
Cunningham made his name at his local team Blyth Spartans who he followed avidly. He was taken on as a defender after being discharged from the army. He was sold to Liverpool in May 1920 for £50.

=== Liverpool ===
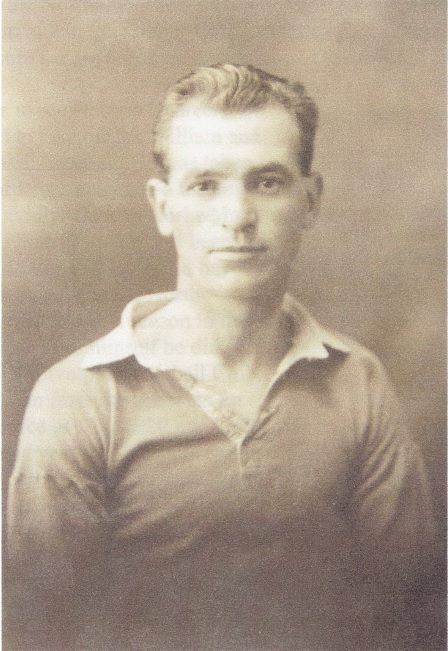
William Cunningham

Cunningham made his Liverpool debut in the first division fixture with Middlesbrough F.C as a left-winger at Anfield on 12 March 1921 and then figured on the right wing in the penultimate game of the season, away to Arsenal on 2 May. Both games finished in goalless draws. His third and final appearance for the Reds was as a replacement for left-half Tom Bromilow in a home match with Bolton Wanderers on 18 March 1922, which Liverpool lost 2–0 in their Championship-winning season. His career at Liverpool, in which he also played for the reserves, was plagued by injury.

=== Barrow ===
He scored a penalty for Barrow against Darlington F.C on a snowy return leg on Boxing Day 1924. Barrow were beaten 5–1.

=== Mid-Rhondda United ===
Cunningham joined Mid Rhondda United on 7 October 1924. The club went into financial crisis soon after.

=== Exeter City ===
Cunningham Joined Exeter During the summer of 1925. William played for the reserves at Exeter in the Southern and Western leagues in 1925/26, making his debut for City in the final practice game on Wedenesday 26 August 1925, in front of 3500 fans, and his Southern League debut 4 days later at home to Ebbw Vale. He also had a career-ending knee injury and had some of his cartilage removed.

== Personal life ==
Cunningham was born in Radcliffe, Northumberland to parents William Cunningham Snr and Jane Cunningham née Jones. He had six siblings one died in infancy. He married Ada Patten in April 1920 and had two children.

He started his apprenticeship in Blyth Shipyards before the Great War. William enlisted in the Royal Northumberland Fusiliers during the war and later joined the Labour Corps. He received the British War Medal, the Victory medal and made the rank of Corporal.

He returned to the North East from Exeter at the end of his football career to start work as a miner in 1926. He also played for Alnmouth Cricket Club, was a member of two golf clubs and enjoyed billiards.

He died in 1934 while working at Shilbottle Colliery, Northumberland.

=== Extract from the Hartlepool Daily newspaper ===
The first fatal accident at Shilbottle Colliery in ten years, during which time it has lifted 2,000,000 tons of coal, occurred yesterday. The victim was William Cunningham (40), a hewer, of Front Street, Alnmouth, and a former professional footballer, who was killed by a fall of stone.
