= John Jones (footballer, born 1895) =

Welsh footballer

Personal information
- Date of birth: 28 March 1895
- Place of birth: Holyhead, Wales
- Date of death: 1962
- Position: Goalkeeper

Senior career*
Years	Team	Apps	(Gls)
1920–1921	Holyhead Railways Institute		
1921–1924	Holyhead		
1924–1925	Liverpool	4	(0)
1925–	Holyhead		
- * Club domestic league appearances and goals

John Jones (28 March 1895 – 1962) was a Welsh footballer who played as a goalkeeper. He played in four Football League matches for Liverpool in the 1924–25 season.
