= 1922–23 Bradford City A.F.C. season =

English football club season

The 1922–23 Bradford City A.F.C. season was the 16th in the club's history.

The club finished 15th in Division Two, and reached the 1st round of the FA Cup.

== Sources ==
- Frost, Terry (1988). Bradford City A Complete Record 1903-1988. Breedon Books Sport. ISBN 0-907969-38-0.
