= Chris Harrington (footballer) =

English footballer

Personal information
- Full name: James Christopher Harrington
- Date of birth: 25 December 1896
- Place of birth: Edge Hill, England
- Date of death: 6 May 1978 (aged 81)
- Place of death: Whiston, Merseyside, England
- Height: 5 ft 10 1/2 in (1.79 m)
- Position: Outside left

Youth career
- South Liverpool

Senior career*
Years	Team	Apps	(Gls)
1920–1921	Liverpool	4	(0)
1921–1922	South Liverpool		
1922–1923	Wigan Borough	21	(4)
1923	Southport	17	(1)
1923–1924	Crewe Alexandra	10	(2)
- Mold Town
1926–1927	New York Giants		
- * Club domestic league appearances and goals

James Christopher Harrington (25 December 1896 – 6 May 1978) was an English footballer who played in the Football League for Liverpool, Wigan Borough, Southport and Crewe Alexandra. He later moved to America to play for New York Giants.
