= David T. McNab =

- Born: 1947 (age 78–79)
- Spouse: Ute Lischke

Academic background
- Education: BA., history, Waterloo Lutheran University; M.A, history, McMaster University; PhD., University of Lancaster
- Thesis: Herman Merivale and the British Empire, 1806-1874, with special reference to British North America, Southern Africa and India (1978)

Academic work
- Discipline: English
- Institutions: York University

David T. McNab FRSC is a Métis historian. He is a professor at York University and cross-appointed in the departments of Equity Studies and Humanities in the Faculty of Liberal Arts and Professional Studies. McNab works on Aboriginal land and treaty rights issues in Canada and as a claims advisor.

== Education ==
McNab has a Bachelor of Art (Honours) in History from Waterloo Lutheran University (now Wilfrid Laurier University.) A Master of Arts in History from McMaster University and a PhD from the University of Lancaster where he wrote his dissertation on the topic of "Herman Merivale and the British Empire, 1806-1874 : with special reference to British North America, Southern Africa and India."

== Career ==
McNab has published extensively on historical and contemporary issues related to Indigenous history, identity, land claims and governance, both in article and book form. His book No Place for Fairness provides an account of the history of Indigenous land claims in Ontario. He has worked as a claims advisor for a number of Indigenous groups and is an active consultant on a range of Indigenous issues. He was the Aboriginal Historical Consultant for TV Ontario on an hour long documentary on Legend and Memory: Ontario First Nations, which aired March 29, 2002. This documentary was later nominated for a Gemini Award. He has also worked as a treaty and historical advisor for a number of communities, such as Bkejwanong First Nations, Mohawks of Akwesasne, and Algonquins of Golden Lake.

In 2017, McNab was elected a Fellow of the Royal Society of Canada.

== Publications ==
- McNab, David (1999). Circles of time: aboriginal land rights and resistance in Ontario. Waterloo, Ont: Wilfrid Laurier University Press. ISBN 978-0-8892-0338-9.
- McNab, David (2009). No place for fairness: indigenous land rights and policy in the Bear Island case and beyond. McGill-Queen's native and northern series; 58. Montréal: McGill-Queen's University Press. ISBN 978-0-7735-3587-9.
- Blockades and resistance: studies in actions of peace and the temagami blockades of 1988-89. Aboriginal studies series (Waterloo, Ont.). Bruce W. Hodgins, David McNab, Ute Lischke (eds.). Waterloo, Ont: Wilfrid Laurier University Press. 2003. ISBN 978-0-88920-381-5.
- Dickason, Olive Patricia; McNab, David (2009). Canada's first nations: a history of founding peoples from earliest times (4th ed.). Don Mills, Ont: Oxford University Press. ISBN 978-0-19-542892-6.
- McNab, David; Nin.Da.Waab.Jig (Group) (1998). Earth, water, air and fire: studies in Canadian ethnohistory. Waterloo, Ont: Wilfrid Laurier University Press. ISBN 978-0-88920-297-9.
- McNab, David; Lischke, Ute (2005). Walking a tightrope: aboriginal people and their representations. Aboriginal studies series (Waterloo, Ont.). Waterloo, Ont: Wilfrid Laurier University Press. ISBN 978-0-88920-460-7.
