= Jack Sambrook =

English footballer

Jack Sambrook (born 10 March 1899, date of death unknown) was an English footballer who played as a striker.
