= Frank Mitchell (goalkeeper) =

Scottish footballer

Personal information
- Full name: Francis William Grant Mitchell
- Date of birth: 25 May 1890
- Place of birth: Elgin, Morayshire, Scotland
- Date of death: 18 January 1958 (aged 67)
- Place of death: Chester, England
- Height: 1.73 m (5 ft 8 in)
- Position: Goalkeeper

Youth career
- 1908–09: Glasgow Friendly Boys
- 1909–10: Milngavie Allander
- 1910–11: Maryhill

Senior career*
Years	Team	Apps	(Gls)
1911–1913	Motherwell	5	(0)
1912	→ Celtic (loan)	0	(0)
1913–1920	Everton	23	(0)
1921–1923	Liverpool	18	(0)
1923–1925	Tranmere Rovers	55	(0)
Total		101	(0)
- * Club domestic league appearances and goals

Frank Mitchell (born 25 May 1890 in Elgin, Morayshire) was a Scottish former footballer who played as a goalkeeper.

== Youth career ==
Frank Mitchell began his football career with Glasgow Friendly Boys in 1908, playing for Milngavie Allander in 1909 and Maryhill in 1910 before signing with Scottish League Motherwell on 24 November 1911.

== Senior career ==
On 20 May 1913, after a loan spell at Celtic in 1912 where he didn't play a first-team game, he joined First Division Everton, making his debut against Burnley that September. He played both sides of the First World War for the Goodison Park team but in each of his three peacetime seasons he was largely back up to Tommy Fern, making only two League appearances as they won the League Championship in 1914–15, and playing 24 matches in total for The Toffees. On 6 January 1921, having had enough of life on the bench, he chose to transfer-list at his own request.

In March 1920, the Liverpool Echo reported the Scottish amateur international was, "the only goalkeeper of the day to play in spectacles".(note possibly an inadvertent reference to another goalkeeping Mitchell, James/Fred of Manchester City, who did play in spectacles).

On 4 February 1921, he moved across Stanley Park to Liverpool for £1250, but he was never likely to displace the great Elisha Scott nor Scottish international Kenneth Campbell. However, he did enjoy a run of 15 consecutive first division matches in the second half of the 1920–21 season, only being on the losing side three times.

In 1921, the Derby Daily Telegraph said Mitchell was, "quite a dapper figure... this canny Scot from Elgin. The Anfield club think the world of him, and rightly so, for he has a glorious knack of anticipation, and gets to shots in wonderful style". He played on just three more occasions, the only games in the 1921–22 season Scott missed.

On 20 January 1923, Mitchell broke his wrist playing for Liverpool reserves against Port Vale and on 23 June, during the summer of 1923, Mitchell had joined his third Merseyside team, Tranmere Rovers. In two seasons at Prenton Park he made 63 appearances. He finished his career with moves to non-league Bangor City and Blue Circle Cement.

== Death ==
Frank spent his last 12 years employed by the Northgate Brewery in Chester. He died on Saturday, 18 January 1958 and is interred at Blacon Cemetery.
