= David McMullan =

Irish footballer

David McMullan (born 1901) was an Irish footballer who played as a defender for Liverpool in The Football League. McMullan signed for Liverpool from Belfast club Distillery in 1925. He made 10 appearances during his debut season, however he only made 2 the following season. He had a run of 14 consecutive league matches in the team during the 1927–28 season, which was to be his last at Liverpool. McMullan was capped three times at international level by Ireland.
