= Billy Matthews (footballer, born 1897) =

Welsh footballer

Personal information
- Date of birth: 16 April 1897
- Date of death: 18 December 1987 (aged 90)
- Position: Centre-half

Senior career*
Years	Team	Apps	(Gls)
- Liverpool
- Bristol City
- Wrexham
- Barrow
- Bradford Park Avenue
- Stockport County
- Chester

International career
	Wales	3	
- * Club domestic league appearances and goals

Robert William Matthews (16 April 1897 – 18 December 1987) was a Welsh footballer who played as a centre-half for Liverpool in the early 1920s and earned three caps for Wales. During World War I, he took part in the Battle of the Somme, in France.

Williams also played in The Football League for Bristol City, Wrexham, Barrow, Bradford Park Avenue, Stockport County and Chester. His non-league clubs included Northwich Victoria, Oswestry Town, Witton Albion, Sandbach Ramblers, Colwyn Bay and Rossendale United

== Later career ==
Following his retirement from football, Matthews turned to coaching and had a spell as manager of Llangollen. He later became a scout for Blackpool and discovered Glyn James.

Matthews was also a keen cyclist well into his late 70s.
