= James Garner (footballer, born 1895) =

English footballer (1895–1975)

Personal information
- Full name: James Albert Garner
- Date of birth: 18 July 1895
- Place of birth: Pendlebury, England
- Date of death: 9 April 1975 (aged 79)
- Height: 5 ft 8 1/2 in (1.74 m)
- Position: Full-back

Senior career*
Years	Team	Apps	(Gls)
- Army
1924–1926	Liverpool	5	(0)
1926–1927	Southport	26	(0)
1927–1928	New Brighton	0	(0)
- * Club domestic league appearances and goals

James Albert Garner (18 July 1895 – 9 April 1975) was an English footballer who played as a full-back.

Born in Pendlebury, Lancashire, Garner made five league appearances for Liverpool, and went on to play for Southport and New Brighton. He played in either of the full-back positions.
