= William McNab (engineer) =

- Born: 1855; Scotland
- Died: 23 February 1923 (aged 67–68); Montreal, Quebec, Canada
- Occupation: railway engineer

William McNab (1855 – 23 February 1923) was a pioneering railway engineer. He came to Canada as a youth and was educated at the McGill Model School and the Montreal Collegiate School. Upon graduating in 1870, he served in the Engineering Department of the Grand Trunk Railway as an indentured pupil. During this time, he was occupied with the construction of the International Bridge (Fort Erie to Buffalo), the Lewiston and Auburn Railroad (Maine), Union Station (Toronto), and the ferry docks at Point Edward, Ontario. From 1875 to 1885, he was exclusively engaged in the G.T.R. surveys, including those between Scarborough and Toronto; the York Yard; lines in Michigan, Ontario, and Quebec; Terminal Station, Montreal; and the Victoria iron tubular bridge across the St. Lawrence River at Montreal.

In 1887, he became chief draughtsman, and nine years later he became assistant engineer. In 1907, he was appointed principal assistant engineer; in 1916, valuation engineer; and in 1918, he became chairman of the valuation committee.

He was a member of the ASCE, the American Railway Association, and the Canadian Railway Club. He was admitted to the EIC in 1887, and became a member of the CSCE in 1900 and 1907; librarian from 1891 to 1899; and was active in its yearly proceedings. He was also a member of the St. Andrew's Society, the Caledonia Society and the Montreal Amateur Athletic Society.

== Engineering projects ==
- Ferry Docks at Point Edward, Ontario
- Grand Trunk Railway
- International Bridge (Fort Erie to Buffalo)
- Lewiston and Auburn Railroad (Maine)
- Terminal Station (Montreal)
- Union Station (Toronto)
- Victoria iron tubular bridge (Montreal)
