= Billy McDevitt =

Northern Irish footballer

Billy McDevitt (5 January 1898–1966) was a Northern Irish footballer who played as a central defender and later managed several teams. Originally playing in Northern Ireland for Belfast United, he joined Liverpool FC in the early 1920s, before moving to Exeter City FC in 1925. He was player-manager and later manager at Exeter, leading the club to the quarterfinals of the 1930–31 FA Cup. He returned to Northern Ireland in the 1930s and managed several Irish Football League clubs, including Belfast Celtic. He died in 1966.
