= William Ramsay McNab =

Scottish physician and botanist

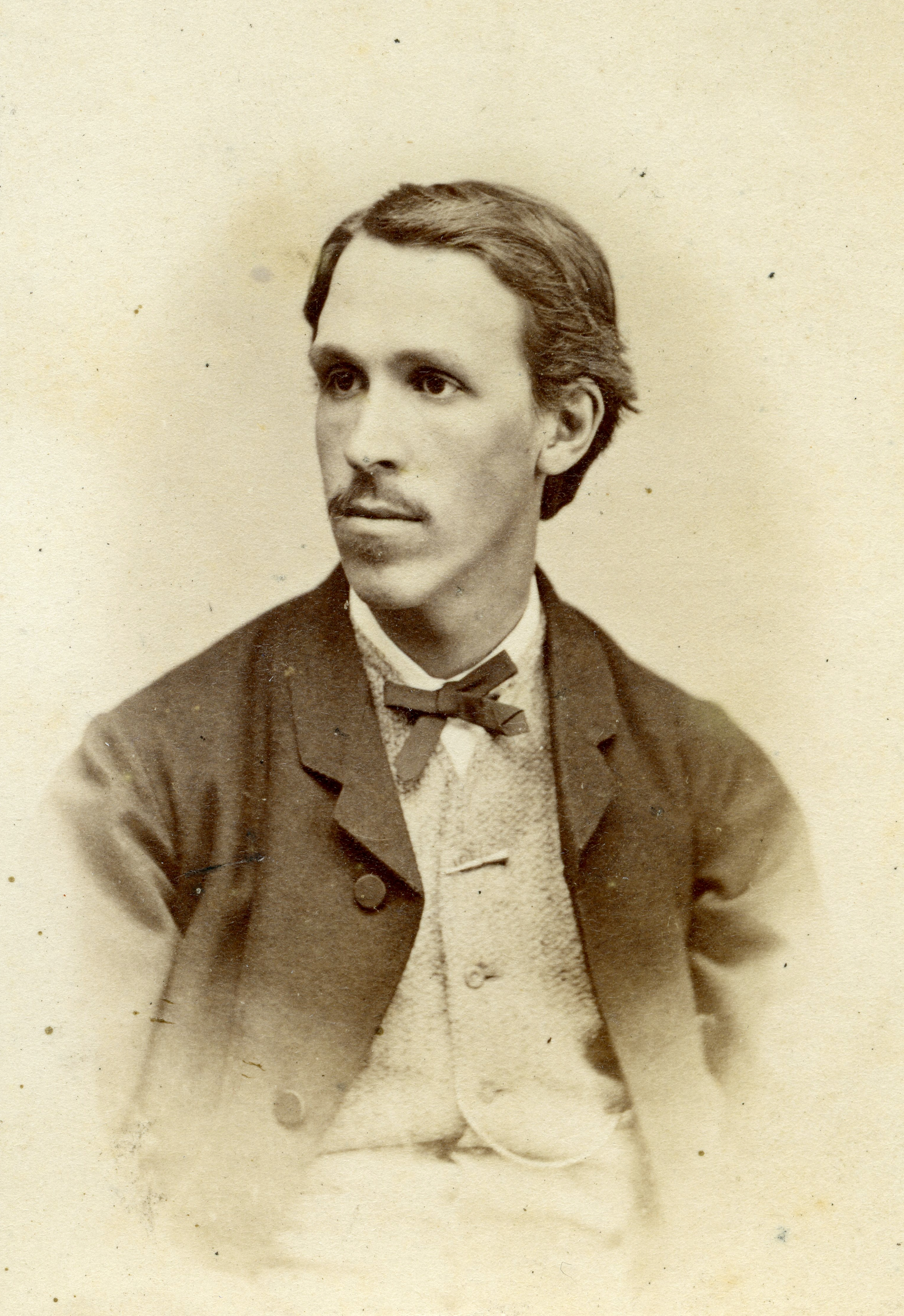
Carte-de-visite portrait, c. 1870

William Ramsay McNab (1844 – 3 December 1889) was a Scottish physician and botanist.

== Early life ==
He was born on 9 November 1844 the son of James McNab (1810-1878), and his wife Margaret Scott (1817-1902). He was the only son, but had five sisters. William's father, James, was a horticulturist and principal gardener from 1849 of the Royal Botanic Garden Edinburgh. William's grandfather, also William McNab, was foreman at the Royal Botanic Gardens, Kew and went on to organise the move of the Royal Botanic Garden, Edinburgh from Leith Walk to its current site at Inverleith.

== Family ==
William married Jane Leggat Gould (-1914) on 29 December 1871. A son, also William Ramsey McNab was born in Dublin on 25 Oct 1872. His son was Jane McNab's executor on her Probate record in 1915.

His father, James McNab, was also an accomplished scientist, also a botanist he was the previous horticulturist and principal gardener at the Royal Botanic Garden.

In 1877 William Robinson described his father as being:

"among the faithful few who never deserted the beautiful hardy flora of our gardens for the famous red and yellow streaks that sometimes disfigure even our great botanic gardens. His knowledge of these in such a national garden is most precious. It comprises the culture and habits of the plants, in addition to a mere acquaintance with their names and relationships."

In 1808, while at Kew, McNab's father, James, married Elizabeth (1777/8–1844), third daughter of Joseph and Judith Whiteman of London. They had five sons and four daughters.

== Education ==
McNab was educated at the Edinburgh Academy. He then continued his education at the University of Edinburgh, where he studied medicine and botany. He then studied in Berlin for a year under Alexander Braun and Karl Koch and also pathological anatomy under Rudolf Virchow. He graduated MD in 1866.

== Family work ==
William McNab (1780–1848) was employed in the Royal Gardens between 1801 and 1810. He originally worked under William Kerr (foreman) and William Townsend Aiton (curator). It was when William Kerr left his role to move to China that William McNab was promoted to foreman. William McNab was also employed at the Botanic Garden, Edinburgh between 1810 and 1848. His specimens from his time in Edinburgh do not appear to be as significant as those gathered beforehand at the Royal Gardens. He studied recently discovered species of plants and collected specimens from these new and often unnamed species. After his death in 1848, his Herbarium was passed down to his son, James McNab who added his own research (see Nelson and Dore, 1987; Nelson 1989) and sometime later the Herbarium was again passed down the family to William Ramsay McNab. After his appointment to the role of Professor of Botany in the Royal College of Science, he took the Herbarium to Dublin around 1872. The McNab's family collections of native British plants have not been officially organised although many of their findings are of historical interest. Their research includes rare and in some cases, even extinct species (see Nelson, 1995b)

== Career ==
Upon McNab's return to Britain from Berlin, he became an assistant physician in the Crichton Royal Institution, Dumfries (1867–70), but he decided to abandon medicine in pursuit of botany to become professor of natural history at the Royal Agricultural College, Cirencester.

Assistant to Professor John Hutton Balfour at Edinburgh, McNab studied in Germany before graduating MD at Edinburgh University (1866). He was appointed professor of natural history at the Royal Agricultural College, Cirencester in 1870. In 1871 he introduced Julius von Sachs's methods to English students.

"A thorough, precise laboratory demonstrator and a fluent, simple, entertaining lecturer, McNab is credited by the anonymous author of his obituary in Nature with introducing to British students, through his lectures at Cirencester in 1871, the incisive experimental methods of Julius Sachs (1832–1897). As no detailed information has been traced about McNab's lecture courses at Cirencester or elsewhere, this particular claim to distinction is difficult to verify; there were others who pioneered the teaching of experimental botany around the same time, such as Thomas Henry Huxley at the Royal School of Mines, and Sydney Vines at Cambridge. Nevertheless, if McNab was indeed teaching Sachs's methods as early as 1871, then that would have preceded both Huxley and Vines."

McNab was appointed to the chair of botany in the Royal College of Science, Dublin March 1872 (-89), and then scientific superintendent of the Royal Botanic Gardens, Glasnevin, Dublin. He was Swiney lecturer on geology at the British Museum.

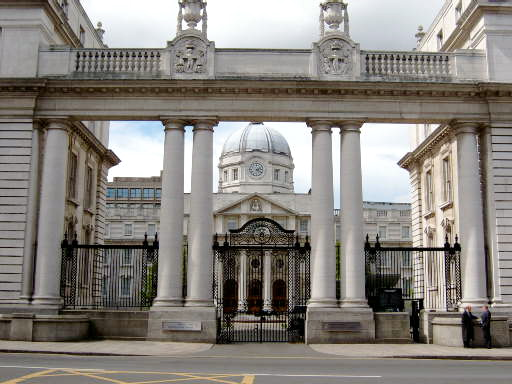
The Royal College of Science, Dublin. Where William Ramsay was chair of botany

McNab has written many books during his lifetime including: Botany: Outlines of Classifications of Plants, On the discoveries of Mr. John Jeffrey and Mr. Robert Brown, collectors to the botanical expeditions to British Columbia between the years 1850 and 1866, ... on the cultivation of certain species and his work was explained in the book Guide to the Royal botanic gardens, Glasnevin. McNab also wrote many articles for the Encyclopædia Britannica (9th edition).

== Death ==
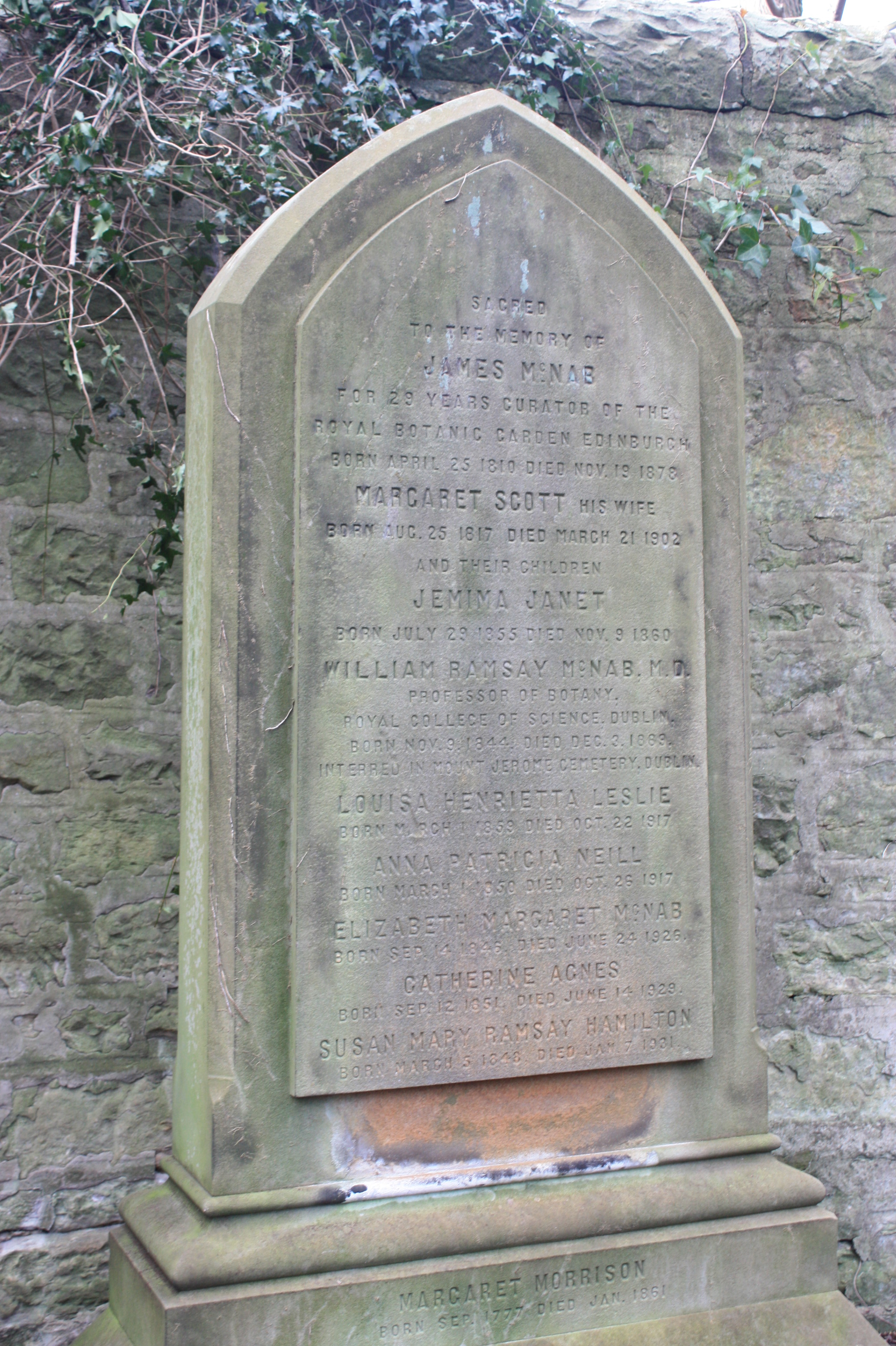
McNab memorial, Warriston Cemetery, Edinburgh

He suffered from heart disease and died in Dublin on 3 December 1889 aged only 45.

After his death, due to the monetary circumstances of his family, his wife was forced to support her family by: taking lodgers into their house, selling McNab's herbarium, library and scientific instruments.

McNab is buried in Mount Jerome Cemetery in Dublin but is also remembered on his parents grave, near the south-west corner of Warriston Cemetery in Edinburgh.

== Sale Of McNab Herbarium ==
The three weeks following McNab's death Frederick Moore (Curator, Glasnevin Botanic Gardens) wrote to the William Thiselton-Dyer at the Royal Botanic Gardens Kew, reporting that he and Frederick Burbidge (Curator, Trinity College Botanic Gardens, Ballsbridge, Dublin) had spent three hours examining the late professor's herbarium. More informed Dyer that ‘the collections are in good order and some of the bundles are most interesting’. Moore later provided a synopsis of the contents of the herbarium. At that time the collections were housed in the McNab family home in the North Dublin suburb of Cabra.

The weeks following McNab’s death saw most of his collection begin the move to the National Museum in central Dublin. The collection consisted of 5 cases of specimens and was then received and stored in the museum on 29 January 1890.

The reason for this sale was explained in a letter from McNab's widow, J. L. McNab, to Dr. Valentine Ball, Director of the Dublin Science and Art Institutions, explaining:

"I have undertaken to store Dr McNab's Herbarium. The Glasnevin cart will deliver it ... please see that the cases & are kept in the Herbarium rooms apart by themselves as they are private property."

Probate was granted on William Ramsay McNab's estate in February 1890, clearing the way for the sale of the herbarium, library and scientific instruments; Dr Ball was informed about the granting of probate. In March, Mrs McNab wrote again to Ball.

"Dear Dr Ball

Mr. Dyer has written, asking if I will send some 50 bundles (No 4 in the advertisement) of the herbarium to Kew, for him to choose what will be useful to them there. Before doing so, I should be obliged if you will kindly say, if you think I should do this at once, or should I ask Mr. Dyer to wait, till the new Professor comes, in hopes that he may wish the herbarium to be bought as a whole for the Museum. I need not say how glad I shall be if this is done, & have it kept together, in Dublin. I hoped to sell the library, as a whole, to a bookseller, but cannot get a purchaser willing to pay the price put on it by friends who know the value. I may have to sell the books separately, as I can get purchasers.

I am, dear Dr Ball, very truly yours. J. L. McNab."

== Selected Publications ==
- "On the Development of the flowers Welwitschia mirabilis" R. Taylor, 1873
- "Experiments on the movement of water in plants" Royal Irish Academy, 1875
- "Outlines of Classification" Longmans, Green, 1882
- "Outlines of Morphology and Physiology" Longmans, Green, 1883
- "Revisions of the species of Abies" General Books, 2010 (revised)
