= William Chalmers (footballer, born 1901) =

Scottish footballer

William Chalmers (3 April 1901 – 28 December 1989) was a Scottish footballer who played as an outside forward.
