= Bert Shears =

English footballer

Personal information
- Full name: Albert Edward Shears
- Date of birth: 12 May 1900
- Place of birth: Newcastle upon Tyne, England
- Date of death: April quarter 1954 (aged 53–54)
- Place of death: Preston, England
- Height: 5 ft 10 in (1.78 m)
- Position: Half back

Youth career
- Close Works
- Spen Black and White

Senior career*
Years	Team	Apps	(Gls)
1921–1924	Preston North End		
1924	Doncaster Rovers		
1924	Aberdare Athletic		
1924–1930	Liverpool	16	(0)
1930–1931	Tranmere Rovers		
1931	Wigan Borough	4	(0)
1931–1932	Barnsley		
1932–1933	Aldershot		
1933–1934	Morecambe		
–	Leyland Motors		
- * Club domestic league appearances and goals

Albert Edward Shears (12 May 1900 – April quarter 1954) was an English footballer who played as a defender.
