= Fred Baron (footballer) =

English footballer

Frederick John Baron (29 December 1901 – November 1993) was an English footballer who played as a forward. He played in the Football League for Liverpool and Southend United as well as in non-league football for Prudhoe Castle and Mid Rhondda United.
