= William Cockburn (footballer) =

English footballer

Bill Cockburn
Personal information
- Full name: William Cockburn
- Date of birth: 1889
- Place of birth: Craghead, County Durham, England
- Position: Defender

Senior career*
Years	Team	Apps	(Gls)
1921-24	Rosehill Villa		
1921-24	Stockport County	76	
1924-28	Liverpool F.C.	67	
1928-30	Queens Park Rangers F.C.	62	
1930-31	Swindon Town F.C.	38	(1)
- * Club domestic league appearances and goals

William Cockburn (born 1889) was an English footballer who played as a defender for Liverpool in The Football League. Cockburn started his career at Rosehill before he moved to Stockport County F.C. He signed for Liverpool in 1924 and appeared 18 times during his debut season. He became a regular in the team the following season as he cemented a place in the Liverpool defence and only missed six of the 42 league matches during the season. He only appeared 9 times the following season and he was transferred to Queens Park Rangers F.C. in 1928.
