= Tom Scott (footballer) =

English footballer (1904–1979)

Tom Scott (6 April 1904 – 24 December 1979) was an English footballer who played as a forward. He was 5 ft 7 in (1.70 m) tall.
