= Ted Parry =

Welsh footballer

Personal information
- Full name: Edward Parry
- Date of birth: 8 or 9 December 1892
- Place of birth: Colwyn Bay, Wales
- Height: 5 ft 8 in (1.73 m)

Senior career*
Years	Team	Apps	(Gls)
- Liverpool

International career
1922–1926	Wales	5	(0)
- * Club domestic league appearances and goals

Edward Parry (8 or 9 December 1892 – year of death unknown) was a Welsh international footballer. He was part of the Wales national football team between 1922 and 1926, playing 5 matches. He played his first match on 4 February 1922 against Scotland and his last match on 13 February 1926 against Northern Ireland. At club level he played for Liverpool. He later became trainer of home town club Colwyn Bay.

== See also ==
- List of Wales international footballers (alphabetical)
