= Jimmy Walsh (footballer, born 1901) =

English footballer

Personal information
- Full name: James Arthur Walsh
- Date of birth: 15 May 1901
- Place of birth: Stockport, England
- Date of death: 1971 (aged 69–70)
- Height: 5 ft 8 1/2 in (1.74 m)
- Position: Striker

Youth career
- 1919–20: Stockport County

Senior career*
Years	Team	Apps	(Gls)
1920–22	Stockport County		
1922–28	Liverpool	69	(24)
1928–31	Hull City		
1931	Crewe Alexandra		
1932–33	Colwyn Bay		
- * Club domestic league appearances and goals

James Arthur Walsh (born 15 May 1901 in Stockport) was a footballer who played for Liverpool from 1923 to 1928. He was Liverpool's top scorer during the 1923–24 with 19 goals in all competitions.
