= Cyril Gilhespy =

English footballer

Personal information
- Full name: Thomas William Cyril Gilhespy
- Date of birth: 18 February 1898
- Place of birth: Fencehouses, Durham, England
- Date of death: 1985 (aged 86–87)
- Height: 5 ft 8 1/2 in (1.74 m)
- Position: Outside right

Youth career
- Chester le Street, Fencehouses

Senior career*
Years	Team	Apps	(Gls)
1920–1921	Sunderland	15	(1)
1921–1925	Liverpool	19	(3)
1925–1929	Bristol City	117	(25)
1929–1930	Blackburn Rovers	5	(1)
1930–1931	Reading	21	(3)
1931–1932	Mansfield Town	19	(4)
1932–1933	Crewe Alexandra	3	(0)
- * Club domestic league appearances and goals

Thomas William Cyril Gilhespy (born 18 February 1898 - 1985) is an English former footballer who made almost 200 Football League appearances for seven different clubs as an outside right.

== Career ==
Cyril Gilhespy played locally for Chester le Street. He joined Sunderland in July 1920 playing First Division football at Roker Park. Gilhespy moved to Liverpool in 1921 and featured in their League Division One champions teams in both 1921-22 and 1922–23. Alex Raisbeck paid £350 in May 1925 to sign Gilhespy for Bristol City. Gilhespy made his debut at outside right in a 0–1 defeat v Norwich City on 29 August 1925 making 35 appearances scoring 6 goals in his first season with the "Robins". When Bristol City finished winners of the Third Division South in 1926-27 Gilhespy made 40 appearances scoring 8 goals including one in the 9–4 victory over Gillingham on 15 January 1927 when Tot Walsh netted a record six goals. In the following season Gilhespy began by scoring in each of the opening five games including 2 goals in a 4–1 win at Grimsby Town but made only 14 appearances scoring 7 goals that season. Gilhespy was a regular in 1928-29 making 28 appearances scoring 4 goals in his final season playing for Bristol City. Gilhespy returned to First Division football with Blackburn Rovers in June 1929 then played for Reading, Mansfield Town and Crewe Alexandra.

== Honours ==
with Bristol City

- Football League Third Division South winner: 1926–27
