= Fred Hopkin =

English footballer

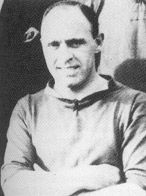

Personal information
- Full name: Frederick Hopkin
- Date of birth: 23 September 1895
- Place of birth: Dewsbury, England
- Date of death: 5 March 1970 (aged 74)
- Place of death: Darlington, England
- Height: 5 ft 8 1/2 in (1.74 m)
- Position: Outside left

Senior career*
Years	Team	Apps	(Gls)
1912–1919	Darlington		
- → Tottenham Hotspur (guest)
1919–1921	Manchester United	70	(8)
1921–1931	Liverpool	335	(10)
1931–1932	Darlington	26	(2)
- * Club domestic league appearances and goals

Frederick Hopkin (23 September 1895 – 5 March 1970) was a football player for Darlington, Manchester United and Liverpool.

== Career ==
An outside left, Hopkin was born in Dewsbury, West Riding of Yorkshire, and began his career with Darlington. After a spell as a wartime guest with Tottenham Hotspur, Hopkin joined Manchester United in 1919. He made his debut away to Derby County on 30 August 1919, playing on the left wing in a 1–1 draw at the Baseball Ground. He missed just three games in his first season with the club and scored eight goals in 41 appearances, his first coming in a 3–3 away draw in the Manchester derby against Manchester City on 11 October 1919. He was less prolific in his second season, with just three goals in 33 appearances. Hopkin's contract with Manchester United resulted in the club being fined £350, having illegally offered him more than the league maximum wage plus a percentage of his transfer fee.

At the end of the 1920–21 season, Hopkin was signed by Liverpool manager David Ashworth for £2,800 in May 1921. He made his debut on 27 August 1921 at Roker Park, but finished on the losing side as Sunderland beat Liverpool 3–0. Hopkin had to wait until 3 March 1923 for his debut goal, when he scored in the 49th minute of Liverpool's 3–0 home win against Bolton Wanderers. The goal will always be remembered in Anfield folklore as it was followed by a fire in the Kemlyn Road stand.

Less than a year after joining Liverpool, Hopkin was celebrating a league title as the team finished with 57 points, six more than second-placed Tottenham Hotspur. He was celebrating again at the end of the following campaign (1922–23) as they clinched the title once more to claim back-to-back titles, this time they acquired 60 points beating Sunderland into second by the same six-point margin.

Hopkin remained a regular starter for the club and quickly put together 360 appearances for Liverpool, it helped his cause that he stayed relatively injury-free during his time at Anfield. In fact, he was an ever-present during the first title-winning season and missed just two of the 42 league matches in the second.

Hopkin was allowed to leave Liverpool in 1931, and he rejoined Darlington for a second spell, this after playing 360 times for the Reds, scoring just 12 goals.
