= Walter Wadsworth =

English footballer

Personal information
- Date of birth: 7 October 1890
- Place of birth: Bootle, England
- Date of death: 12 October 1951 (aged 61)

Walter Wadsworth (7 October 1890 – 12 October 1951) was a footballer who played for Liverpool in the early part of the 20th century.

== Life and playing career ==
Born in Bootle, Liverpool, Merseyside, England, local lad Wadsworth played for Lingdale and Ormskirk before being signed, as an amateur, by Liverpool manager Tom Watson, on 23 April 1912, he was to make his debut on 20 March 1915 in a First Division fixture at Ayresome Park against Middlesbrough, the game ended badly for the Reds as they slumped to a heavy 3–0 defeat. He didn't manage to score his first Liverpool goal until 28 August 1920, this was mainly due to the First World War, it came in a match at Anfield against Man City, more happily for Wadsworth, Liverpool won the match 4–2.

Although the Great War interrupted Wadsworth's career, the uncompromising centre-half did play for Liverpool during this spell in the Lancashire tournament that was set up along with the other 3 regional tournaments. Upon returning to Liverpool after the conclusion of the war, Walter had a strong season playing in 33 of Liverpool's league fixtures, he was joined during this spell by his brother Harold, unfortunately, Harold never had the same impact on the club that Walter had and only made just over 50 sporadic appearances in five years.

Walter was a major player in the back-to-back championship winning seasons, missing just 10 of the 84 leagues games available. He remained a stalwart of the side for the next two campaigns but towards the end of the 1924–25 season, David Pratt replaced him in the starting line-up. He would subsequently make only four appearances during the following season which turned out to be his last as he was allowed to leave for Bristol City on 14 May 1926.

Before finally retiring Wadsworth went on to represent Flint Town, New Brighton and Oswestry Town.

== Career details ==
- Liverpool F.C (1912–1926)† 241 appearances, 8 goals - Two First Division Championships winners medals (1922 and 1923)

†Wadsworth career was interrupted for 4 years due to the 1914/18 war.
