= Danny Shone =

English footballer

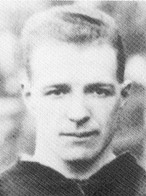
Danny Shone

Danny Shone (born 22 May 1899) was an English footballer who played as a striker for Liverpool in The Football League between 1921 and 1928. He was signed from local amateur side Grayson's of Garston in May 1921. In total he made 81 appearances for Liverpool and scored 26 goals.
