= David Ashworth =

English footballer and manager (1867–1947)

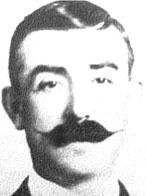

Personal information
- Full name: David George Ashworth
- Date of birth: 2 June 1867
- Place of birth: Blackpool, Lancashire
- Date of death: 1947 (aged 79)
- Place of death: Blackpool, Lancashire

Managerial career
- Years: Team
- 1906–1914: Oldham Athletic
- 1914–1919: Stockport County
- 1919–1923: Liverpool
- 1923–1924: Oldham Athletic
- 1924–1925: Manchester City
- 1926–1927: Walsall
- 1928–1930: Caernarvon Athletic
- 1930–1931: Llanelly

David George Ashworth (2 June 1867 – 1947) was an English football referee and manager.

He became the first manager of Oldham Athletic in 1906, spending eight successful years there before moving on to manage Stockport County in 1914 and staying with them through the First World War.

In 1920 he was appointed manager of Liverpool and in his first season in charge he guided them to their second successive season in 4th place, eight points behind the Champions Burnley.

The following season, 1921–22, Ashworth led Liverpool to their third League Championship. The team were well on their way to a second successive Championship the following season, when in February 1923 Ashworth left the table-topping side to return to Oldham, then at the bottom of the league. Oldham ended the season relegated, while Liverpool only won one of their last seven games, but still won the Championship by six points.

Ashworth remained at Oldham for just over a year before moving to Manchester City, but he resigned in 1925 as the club struggled towards relegation. He next tried his hand in management with a brief spell with Walsall between 1926 and 1927.

He then moved into the Welsh football system at Caernarvon Athletic in the Welsh National League (North) where he was manager-trainer of a team which was already top of the Welsh League North, and did not lose a home match for two years. The club’s total wage bill was £40 a week in a town of only 10,000, a feat which was described in the local paper as one of the ‘little marvels of the football world’. He finally moved to Llanelly where the club reached its best league position before the 1950s, scoring 72 goals in a 22-match season in contrast to 55 in 28 games before his arrival. On 5 December 1931, the ‘Star’ and ‘South Wales Daily Post’ reported his resignation without explanation.

== Managerial career ==
Club	From	To	Record				
Club	From	To	Games	Won	Drawn	Lost	%
Oldham Athletic	1906	1914	283	126	67	90	44.52
Stockport County	1914	1919	61	25	12	24	40.98
Liverpool	1920	1923	58	25	14	9	43.1
Oldham Athletic	1923	1924	63	20	22	21	31.75
Manchester City	1924	1925	56	20	13	23	35.71
Walsall	1926	1927	42	16	9	17	38.1
Total	1906–27		563	232	137	184	41.2

== Career honours ==
Liverpool

- Football League First Division: 1921–22

== See also ==
- List of English football championship winning managers
