= Dick Forshaw =

English footballer

Personal information
- Full name: Richard Forshaw Bentham
- Date of birth: 20 August 1893
- Place of birth: Widnes, Lancashire, England
- Date of death: 26 August 1963 (aged 70)
- Place of death: Lewes, Sussex
- Height: 5 ft 8 1/2 in (1.74 m)
- Position: Striker

Senior career*
Years	Team	Apps	(Gls)
1919–1927	Liverpool	266	(117)
1927–1929	Everton	42	(8)
1929–1930	Wolves		
1930	Hednesford Town		
1930–1931	Rhyl Athletic		
- * Club domestic league appearances and goals

Richard Forshaw Bentham, known as Richard (Dick) Forshaw (20 August 1893 – 26 August 1963) was a footballer who played, predominantly, for Liverpool and also Merseyside rivals Everton during the period between the First and Second World Wars. The only player ever to win league titles with both of the two Merseyside rivals, he also played for Wolverhampton Wanderers, Hednesford Town, and Rhyl Athletic.

== Life and playing career ==
Born in Widnes, Lancashire, England, Forshaw’s father, William Bentham, was from Lancashire and his mother (Eliza, née Thompson) was from County Durham. The family twice relocated from Widnes to Gateshead and they remained in the north east after their second move which came when Richard was a toddler. He appears on the 1901 and 1911 census records as Richard Bentham or Richard Forshaw Bentham but, by 1921, he is listed as Richard Forshaw, professional footballer. He had played for both Nottm Forest and Middlesbrough in wartime matches before gaining his first professional contract at Liverpool in 1919. He made his debut in a 1–0 defeat to Arsenal at Highbury in a Division 1 fixture on 8 September 1919, he opened his account 12 days later at Villa Park when his 30th-minute strike was the only goal of the game against Aston Villa.

Forshaw continued to find the net on a regular basis and his goals helped the Anfield club gain back-to-back titles in 1922 and 1923, he was an ever-present in the 84 championship matches and scored a remarkable 36 goals, his average was a respectable goal every 2 1/3 games during this spell not at all bad for an inside-forward. Forshaw also topped the Liverpool scoring list in 1924–25 with 19 goals.

The slim-built 5 ft 10 in (1.78 m) Forshaw was to have his best season in the red of Liverpool in 1925–26 when his return from the 35 matches he played was 29 goals, a goal every 1.2 games. This included a hat-trick against bitter rivals Manchester United, at Anfield, which ended with Liverpool defeating United 5–0 with Forshaw scoring in the 21st, 63rd and 70th minutes, Forshaw's striking partner Harry Chambers scored in the 55th minute whilst the final goal was put away by Archie Rawlings 4 minutes from time.

Forshaw was allowed to leave Liverpool in March 1927, he made the short journey across Stanley Park to Everton where he linked up with Toffees legend Dixie Dean, Forshaw's experience helped Everton win the League title in his first season, becoming the first and only player to win the title with both Everton and Liverpool. Dick went on to join Wolves in 1929, he also played for Hednesford Town, Rhyl Athletic and Waterford before he finally retired. Forshaw was never selected to play for England.

In 1932 Forshaw was sentenced to 12 months imprisonment with hard labour for fraud after being found to have amended a winning betting slip from £2 to £20 by adding the 0 on himself. The 5 March 1941 edition of the Portsmouth Evening News reported his conviction (under his full name of Richard Forshaw Bentham) for the theft of 24,000 cigarettes. The article referenced his background as a Liverpool and Everton footballer and noted that he had served two previous 18 month jail terms for larceny.

== Career details ==
- Liverpool F.C (1919–1927) 288 appearances 124 goals - Two Football League First Division Championship winners medals (1922 and 1923)
- Everton F.C (1927–1929) 42 appearances 8 goals - Football League First Division Championship winners medal (1930)
