= Jock McNab =

Scottish association football player (1894-1949)

Personal information
- Full name: John McNab
- Date of birth: 17 April 1894
- Place of birth: Cleland, Scotland
- Date of death: 2 January 1949 (aged 54)
- Place of death: Bootle, England
- Height: 6 ft 1 in (1.85 m)
- Position: Right half

Senior career*
Years	Team	Apps	(Gls)
–	Bellshill Athletic		
1919–1928	Liverpool	200	(6)
1928–1930	Queens Park Rangers	54	(2)
Total		254	(6)

International career
1923	Scotland	1	(0)
- * Club domestic league appearances and goals

John McNab (17 April 1894 – 2 January 1949) was a Scottish international footballer who played as a right half, predominantly for Liverpool, during the period between the First and Second World Wars.

== Playing career ==
=== Club ===
Born in Cleland, Lanarkshire, McNab played for Bellshill Athletic before being signed by Liverpool in November 1919. He made his debut in a 0–0 draw with bitter rivals Man United at Anfield in a First Division fixture on New Year's Day 1920; he had to wait until 15 April 1922 to open his account for the Reds, again it was at Anfield and the opponents were Cardiff, his 73rd-minute strike was the fourth goal of the 5–1 defeat of the Bluebirds.

McNab, a wing-half, struggled to break into the starting line-up during his first two seasons at Liverpool; he made just three appearances in this spell. It wasn't until ten games into the 1921–22 campaign that McNab nailed a permanent role in manager David Ashworth's plans but only after Jack Bamber and Francis Checkland had started the first fixtures; he took his chance well and only missed four of the remaining matches in the first of the back-to-back title winning seasons. McNab added a second winner's medal to his collection when he missed just tyree matches of the 1922–23 season.

McNab remained a stalwart of the Reds backline for four more years when he was allowed to leave for West London club Queens Park Rangers in June 1928 at the age of 34. McNab had appeared in a red shirt 222 times, exactly 200 in the league, scoring 6 goals, all of which were in the league. He played regularly for QPR for two years before retiring. He later ran a hotel in Bootle, Merseyside.

=== International ===
McNab was picked for Scotland once, in a British Championship match against Wales on 17 March 1923. The game was played at Love Street, Paisley and finished in a 2–0 victory for the Scots.

== Personal life ==
His younger brother David was also a footballer who played for clubs including Fulham. The siblings faced each other when Fulham beat Liverpool 3–1 in the 1925–26 FA Cup Fourth Round; they were later in opposition in the Third Division South after Jock joined Queens Park Rangers.

== Honours ==
Liverpool

- Football League First Division: winner 1921–22, 1922–23

== See also ==
- List of Scottish football families
