= Ephraim Longworth =

English footballer (1887–1968)

Personal information
- Date of birth: 2 October 1887
- Place of birth: Halliwell, Bolton, England
- Date of death: 7 January 1968 (aged 80)

Senior career*
Years	Team	Apps	(Gls)
-1908	Hyde		
1908-	Bolton Wanderers		
-1910	Leyton		
1910-1928	Liverpool		

International career
1920-1923	England	5	
- * Club domestic league appearances and goals

Ephraim Longworth (2 October 1887 – 7 January 1968) was an England international footballer for Liverpool in the early part of the twentieth century. He was one of Liverpool's all-time greats, and was Liverpool's first ever England captain.

== Life and playing career ==
Longworth, born in Halliwell, Bolton, Lancashire, England, noted for his lock of hair, was comfortable in either the right or left-back berths.

Longworth spent his early career with Chorley Old Road Congregationals, Bolton St Luke's, and Halliwell Rovers.

He joined Bolton Wanderers in the first division of the Lancashire Combination in 1908 from Hyde and then moved to London, signing for Southern League club Leyton. It was here that Liverpool manager Tom Watson spotted his potential and signed him in 1910. He made his debut on 19 September 1910 in a Football League First Division game at Bramall Lane, Sheffield, but Liverpool lost 2–0 to Sheffield United.

Longworth went on to appear 370 times in a Red shirt without scoring a single goal for the Anfield club; in fact he went on to play until he was 40 years old. One of Liverpool's all-time greats Ephraim has the distinction of being Liverpool's first ever captain of the England national team, when he was given the job in only his second appearance - a 2–0 against Belgium at the Oscar Bossaert Stadion, Molenbeek-Saint-Jean, Brussels in 1921. His debut for the national side was in 1920 and was just as memorable, England fought back from 4-2 down to beat bitter rivals Scotland 5–4 at Hillsborough. Longworth went on to gain 5 international caps, none of which England lost.

During his time at Anfield Longworth won back to back league titles in 1921-22 and 1922–23 and appeared in the 1-0 1914 FA Cup Final defeat to Burnley in front of the reigning King George V.

Longworth's final game came 17½ years after his first appearance for the club, it came in a 2–0 defeat at St Andrews against Birmingham on 21 April 1928. After retiring in 1928 Longworth stayed on at Liverpool in a coaching role. Ephraim died in 1968 forever a Liverpool legend. In 2006 despite having been retired for almost 80 years, Longworth was voted in at 72nd place following a survey on Liverpool's website entitled '100 Players which Shook the Kop'.

== Career details ==
- Liverpool F.C. (1910–1928) 371 appearances 2 Football League Championship medals (1921–22, 1922–23 ), (he played his last game as a 40-year-old)
- England (1920–1923) 5 caps (Ephraim also captained his country, the first Liverpool player to do so)
