= Harry Chambers =

English footballer and manager (1896–1949)

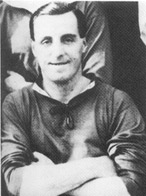
- Harry Chambers in 1915

Personal information
- Full name: Henry Chambers
- Date of birth: 17 November 1896
- Place of birth: Willington Quay, England
- Date of death: 29 June 1949 (aged 52)
- Place of death: Shrewsbury, England
- Height: 5 ft 10 in (1.77 m)
- Position: Striker

Youth career
- 1912–1913: Willington United Methodists
- 1913–1915: North Shields Athletic

Senior career*
Years	Team	Apps	(Gls)
1915–1928	Liverpool	339	(151)
1928–1929	West Bromwich Albion	40	(4)
1929–1933	Oakengates Town		
1933–1934	Hereford United		

International career
1921–1923	England	8	(5)

Managerial career
- 1929–1933: Oakengates Town
- * Club domestic league appearances and goals

Henry Chambers (17 November 1896 – 29 June 1949) was an England international footballer who played in the Football League for Liverpool and West Bromwich Albion.

== Life and playing career ==
Born in Willington Quay, Northumberland, England, Harry was a schoolboy international at age eleven when he attended Willington Board School. After school he played for North Shields Athletic, Kings Park (on loan), Belfast Distillery (wartime guest) and Glentoran (wartime guest) before he was signed, from North Shields, for the Reds by manager Tom Watson in April 1915, just before the suspension of league football due to the outbreak of the First World War. He enlisted in Irish infantry regiment The Connaught Rangers, with whom he served until invalided out of the army in 1917.

He had to wait 4 years to make his debut until 30 August 1919 in a First Division match at Valley Parade, a game Liverpool won 3–1 against Bradford and in which Chambers opened his Anfield goalscoring account.

After scoring on his debut he went on to establish himself as the undisputed goal king of Anfield in the immediate post-war years. Topping the club's goalscoring charts for the next five seasons, his shooting prowess was instrumental in Liverpool winning back-to-back League Championships in 1922 and 1923, he scored 41 times in 72 appearances during this spell averaging a goal every 1 3/4 games. In total he scored 151 goals in 338 appearances for Liverpool including a memorable hat-trick in a 5–1 win over Everton at Anfield in October 1922.

The left-footer nicknamed 'Smiler' was selected by England on 8 occasions scoring 5 goals, his international debut came on 14 March 1921 in a 0-0 British Championship draw with Wales at Ninian Park, Cardiff, his first goal for his country came in a 2-0 friendly victory over Belgium at the Oscar Bossaert Stadion, Molenbeek-Saint-Jean, Brussels on 21 May 1921, Chambers best game for his country came on 22 October 1921 in a British Championship match at The Hawthorns, West Bromwich, it was against Ireland and he scored both goals in the 2–0 victory.

Harry was allowed to leave and in April 1928, aged 32, he signed for West Bromwich Albion where the forward who scored a goal every 2 1/4 games for the Reds was converted to a centre-half! Before he retired from the professional game he went on to be player-manager for Oakengates Town (1929-1933), at the same time as running a local public house called The Stafford Arms, and represent Hereford. Even after retiring Chambers, who was employed for the last ten years of his life at the factory of Messrs Sankey's in nearby Hadley, could not stay away from the game he loved and continued to play for Shropshire team Oakengates right up until his death at Shrewsbury in 1949 aged 52. He was buried at Wombridge Parish Church near Oakengates.

=== Career details ===
- Liverpool F.C (1915–1928) † 338 appearances, 151 goals - Two First Division Championships winners medals (1922 and 1923)

†Although Chambers signed in 1915 he was unable to make his debut until the opening day of the 1919/20 season due to outbreak of World War I of 1914/18.

- England (1921–1923) 8 caps, 5 goals
