= Tom Bromilow =

English footballer and manager (1894–1959)

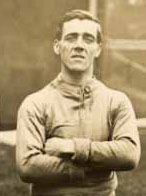

Personal information
- Full name: Thomas George Bromilow
- Date of birth: 7 October 1894
- Place of birth: Liverpool, England
- Date of death: 4 March 1959 (aged 64)
- Place of death: Nuneaton, England
- Height: 5 ft 9 in (1.75 m)
- Position: Left half

Senior career*
Years	Team	Apps	(Gls)
1919–30	Liverpool	341	(11)

International career
1921–25	England	5	(0)

Managerial career
- 1930–32: AFC (Amsterdam)
- 1932–35: Burnley
- 1935–36: Crystal Palace
- 1936–37: Newport County
- 1937–39: Crystal Palace
- 1939–45: Leicester City
- 1946–50: Newport County
- * Club domestic league appearances and goals

Thomas George Bromilow (7 October 1894 – 4 March 1959) was an English international left half footballer who played for Liverpool between 1919 and 1930. He was virtually ever-present during the back-to-back League title triumphs of the early 1920s.

== Life and playing career ==
Born in West Derby, Liverpool, England, Bromilow was signed by Liverpool after the 24-year-old turned up at Anfield one afternoon in 1919 asking for a trial. He had only recently been demobilised from the army. George Patterson, the then Liverpool assistant manager, agreed to give him a trial and was impressed by his skill and Bromilow was signed.

Bromilow made his debut on 25 October 1919 at Turf Moor in a Division One match against Burnley, a game that the Reds won 2–1; his first goal came in the 57th minute of a 3–0 league victory at Burnden Park over Bolton Wanderers on 24 January 1920. Bromilow soon became an established member of the side that was to win back-to-back League titles in 1921–22 and 1922–23. A fine tackler and distributor of the ball, Bromilow was regarded as the brains of the team and blossomed into a full England international within three years of turning professional. He continued to be an influential first team regular until the latter part of the decade, serving the club with distinction and leading by example as team captain.

He was capped for England on five occasions between 1921 and 1925.

After retiring from playing, Bromilow took up a career in coaching and went to coach in Amsterdam during the summer of 1930. In October 1932 he was appointed Burnley manager, the first manager of the club to have been a former professional player, and he remained there until summer 1935. He later went on to manage Crystal Palace (two spells), Newport County (two spells) and Leicester City.

In 2006, he was included in the 100 Players That Shook The Kop poll, as voted by fans on the Liverpool FC official site.

== Personal life ==
Tom was married to Lillian Mabel May Kelly.

He died suddenly on a train in March 1959 while scouting for Leicester City.

== Honours ==
=== As a player ===
Liverpool

- Football League First Division winners: 1922, 1923
- Charity Shield runners-up: 1923

=== As a manager ===
Crystal Palace

- Football League Third Division South (Level 3) runners-up: 1939
