= List of FA and league honours won by men's clubs =

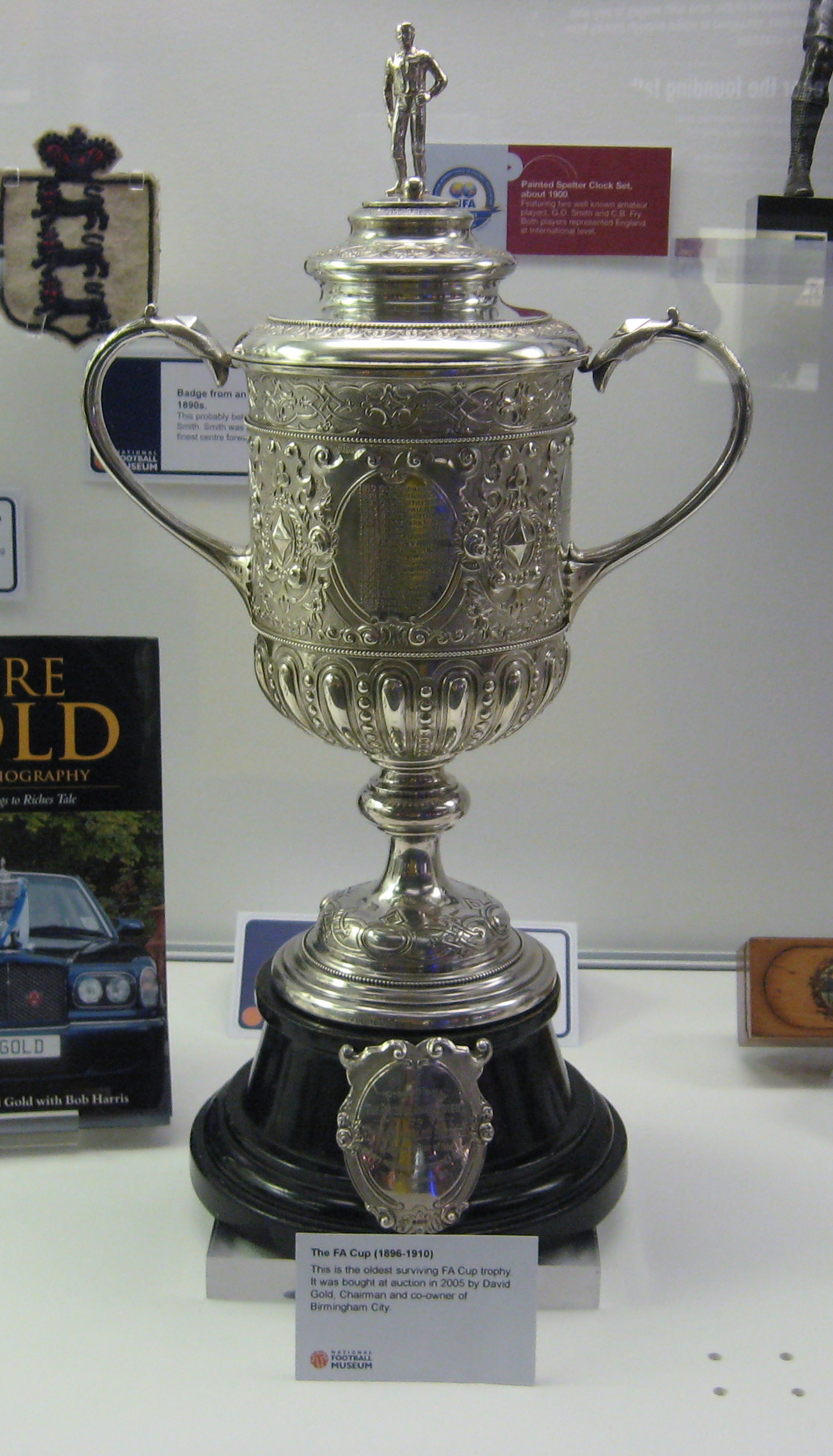
The oldest surviving FA Cup, used between 1896 and 1910

This page lists club winners of all men's association football honours run by the English national governing body The FA and its mostly self-governing subsidiary leagues the English Football League and Premier League.

England's first competition organized by a national body, the FA Cup, began in the 1871–72 season, making it the oldest football competition in the world. Arsenal hold the record number of wins, 14. League football began in the next decade with the founding of The Football League in 1888–89. The name First Division was adopted in 1892, when The Football League gained a second division. The First Division remained the highest division of the English football league system until 1992, when the Premier League was founded. Manchester United have won the most top division titles, with 20. The English equivalent of the super cup began in 1898 with the inauguration of the Sheriff of London Charity Shield, pitting the best professional and amateur sides of the year against each other. The trophy would develop into the FA Charity Shield in 1908, which was later renamed the FA Community Shield in 2002. The Football League created its own knockout competition in 1960, the League Cup. The Anglo-Italian League Cup was created in 1969 to match English cup winners against the winners of the Coppa Italia, and was permanently disbanded in 1976. In 1985, the Full Members Cup and Football League Super Cup were created as substitutes for UEFA competitions after UEFA responded to the Heysel Stadium disaster by banning English clubs. They finished in 1986 and 1992 respectively. The Football League Centenary Trophy marked The Football League's 100th birthday, in the 1988–89 season.

In the history of English football various subordinate competitions have also been organized, for those clubs ineligible for higher competitions. By 1893, professional teams had come to dominate the FA Cup, so The FA created the FA Amateur Cup for the 1893–94 season. This competition was discontinued in 1974, with the abolition of official amateur status and the creation of its partial successor the FA Vase. Sunday league football clubs play in the FA Sunday Cup, begun in 1964. The FA Trophy commenced in 1969 for those participants in Steps 1–4 of the National League System (tiers 5–8 of the overall English football league system). The Watney Cup, active from 1970 until 1973 was one of the first of these to have top division participants, though only for clubs that didn't qualify for UEFA competitions. The Anglo-Italian Cups, also begun in 1970, ran on and off in various formats until 1996. A third competition begun in 1970 was the Texaco Cup. It had entirely top division participants apart from the final season, and was one of the few competitions featuring clubs from different nations of the United Kingdom and Ireland, however, it only admitted clubs that didn't qualify for UEFA competitions. It shrunk in 1976 to become the Anglo-Scottish Cup, and shrunk again in 1981 to become the Football League Group Cup. In 1983, this was replaced by the Associate Members Cup, which featured clubs from the Third Division and Fourth Division. In 1992, when lower division clubs became full members of the Football League, the Associate Members Cup took the name Football League Trophy, before being renamed again in 2016 as the EFL Trophy. Since the 2016–17 season, sixteen Category One academies from Premier League and Championship clubs have taken part in the competition alongside League One and League Two sides. The first clubs to receive an invitation will be the sixteen clubs that will be participating in the Premier League in the current season and which operate a Category One Academy and the order of priority will be based on first team finishing position in the immediately preceding season (across both the Premier League and Championship Division of the League).

== Top-qualifying honours ==
This section only lists competitions where there are no higher competitions clubs could participate in instead. See the next section for other competitions. See the final section for top-qualifying friendly competitions.

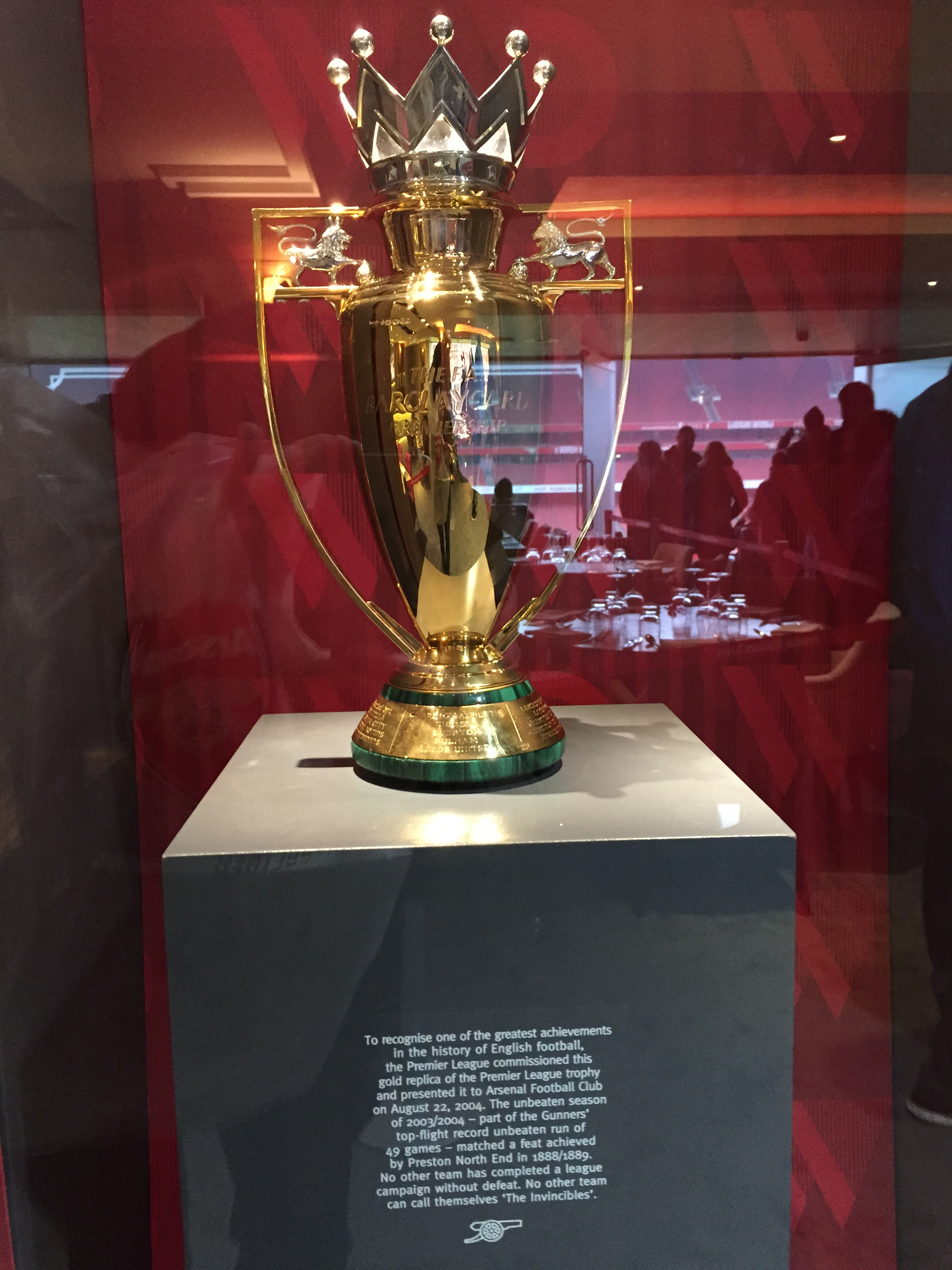
The Premier League trophy. This one is a unique gold colour to commemorate Arsenal's completion of the only unbeaten 38-match season.

EFC
English football champions. The Premier League (since 1992) succeeded the Football League First Division (1888 until 1992) as the top-division.
FAC
FA Cup. Since 1871.
EFLC
EFL Cup. Since 1960.
FACS
FA Community Shield. Since 1908. Known as the FA Charity Shield until 2002.
SLCS
Sheriff of London Charity Shield (discontinued). 1898 until 1907. Predecessor to the FA Community Shield above. The post-1907 fundraising matches for the Shield are not included because they no longer had FA involvement.
FLSC
Football League Super Cup (discontinued). One-off tournament held between 1985 and 1986.
FMC
Full Members Cup (discontinued). Held from 1985 to 1992. For the first season, the Football League Super Cup above was a higher competition for which six clubs qualified instead, but the season is included here for completeness.
FLCT
Football League Centenary Trophy (discontinued). Held during the 1988–89 season to celebrate Football League's 100th birthday.
AILC
Anglo-Italian League Cup (discontinued). Held from 1969 until 1971 and from 1975 until 1976.

Winners of each competition are referenced above. Numbers in bold are record totals for that competition. Clubs in italics are Double winners: they have won two or more of the top division, the FA Cup, and the EFL Cup in the same season. Trophies that were shared between two clubs are counted as honours for both teams. Clubs tied in total honours are listed chronologically by most recent honour won.

Last updated on 16 August 2026.

Men's clubs by top-qualifying competitions won
Club	EFC	FAC	EFLC	FACS	SLCS	FMC	FLSC	FLCT	AILC	Total
Manchester United	**20**	13	6	**21**	—	—	—	—	—	**60**
Liverpool	**20**	8	**10**	16	1	—	**1**	—	—	56
Arsenal	14	**14**	2	18	—	—	—	**1**	—	49
Manchester City	10	8	9	7	—	—	—	—	—	34
Chelsea	6	8	5	4	—	**2**	—	—	—	25
Tottenham Hotspur	2	8	4	7	1	—	—	—	**1**	23
Everton	9	5	—	9	—	—	—	—	—	23
Aston Villa	7	7	5	1	2	—	—	—	—	22
Wolverhampton Wanderers	3	4	2	4	—	—	—	—	—	13
Newcastle United	4	6	1	1	1	—	—	—	—	13
Blackburn Rovers	3	6	1	1	—	1	—	—	—	12
Sunderland	6	2	—	1	1	—	—	—	—	10
Sheffield Wednesday	4	3	1	1	1	—	—	—	—	10
Nottingham Forest	1	2	4	1	—	**2**	—	—	—	10
West Bromwich Albion	1	5	1	2	—	—	—	—	—	9
Leeds United	3	1	1	2	—	—	—	—	—	7
Leicester City	1	1	3	2	—	—	—	—	—	7
Sheffield United	1	4	—	—	1	—	—	—	—	6
Huddersfield Town	3	1	—	1	—	—	—	—	—	5
Portsmouth	2	2	—	1	—	—	—	—	—	5
Burnley	2	1	—	2	—	—	—	—	—	5
Wanderers	—	5	—	—	—	—	—	—	—	5
Bolton Wanderers	—	4	—	1	—	—	—	—	—	5
Preston North End	2	2	—	—	—	—	—	—	—	4
Derby County	2	1	—	1	—	—	—	—	—	4
West Ham United	—	3	—	1	—	—	—	—	—	4
Corinthian	—	—	—	—	**3**	—	—	—	—	3
Crystal Palace	—	1	—	1	—	1	—	—	—	3
Ipswich Town	1	1	—	—	—	—	—	—	—	2
Bury	—	2	—	—	—	—	—	—	—	2
Old Etonians	—	2	—	—	—	—	—	—	—	2
Cardiff City	—	1	—	1	—	—	—	—	—	2
Birmingham City	—	—	2	—	—	—	—	—	—	2
Norwich City	—	—	2	—	—	—	—	—	—	2
Swindon Town	—	—	1	—	—	—	—	—	**1**	2
Barnsley	—	1	—	—	—	—	—	—	—	1
Blackburn Olympic	—	1	—	—	—	—	—	—	—	1
Blackpool	—	1	—	—	—	—	—	—	—	1
Bradford City	—	1	—	—	—	—	—	—	—	1
Charlton Athletic	—	1	—	—	—	—	—	—	—	1
Clapham Rovers	—	1	—	—	—	—	—	—	—	1
Coventry City	—	1	—	—	—	—	—	—	—	1
Notts County	—	1	—	—	—	—	—	—	—	1
Old Carthusians	—	1	—	—	—	—	—	—	—	1
Oxford University	—	1	—	—	—	—	—	—	—	1
Royal Engineers	—	1	—	—	—	—	—	—	—	1
Southampton	—	1	—	—	—	—	—	—	—	1
Wigan Athletic	—	1	—	—	—	—	—	—	—	1
Wimbledon	—	1	—	—	—	—	—	—	—	1
Luton Town	—	—	1	—	—	—	—	—	—	1
Middlesbrough	—	—	1	—	—	—	—	—	—	1
Oxford United	—	—	1	—	—	—	—	—	—	1
Queens Park Rangers	—	—	1	—	—	—	—	—	—	1
Stoke City	—	—	1	—	—	—	—	—	—	1
Swansea City	—	—	1	—	—	—	—	—	—	1
Brighton & Hove Albion	—	—	—	1	—	—	—	—	—	1
Queen's Park	—	—	—	—	1	—	—	—	—	1
Reading	—	—	—	—	—	1	—	—	—	1

=== Most recent (top-qualifying) ===
See the first section for glossary of abbreviations. See the second section for clubs by wins in lower-qualifying competitions. Years in bold indicate the club that won the honour most recently.

Last updated on 16 August 2026.

Men's clubs by most recent top-qualifying honours won
Club	EFC	FAC	EFLC	FACS	SLCS	FMC	FLSC	FLCT	AILC	All
Arsenal	**2026**	2020	1993	**2026**	—	—	—	**1989**	—	**2026**
Manchester City	2024	**2026**	**2026**	2024	—	—	—	—	—	2026
Crystal Palace	—	2025	—	2025	—	1991	—	—	—	2025
Liverpool	2025	2022	2024	2022	1906	—	**1986**	—	—	2025
Newcastle United	1927	1955	2025	1909	1907	—	—	—	—	2025
Manchester United	2013	2024	2023	2016	—	—	—	—	—	2024
Leicester City	2016	2021	2000	2021	—	—	—	—	—	2021
Chelsea	2017	2018	2015	2009	—	1990	—	—	—	2018
Wigan Athletic	—	2013	—	—	—	—	—	—	—	2013
Swansea City	—	—	2013	—	—	—	—	—	—	2013
Birmingham City	—	—	2011	—	—	—	—	—	—	2011
Portsmouth	1949	2008	—	1949	—	—	—	—	—	2008
Tottenham Hotspur	1961	1991	2008	1991	1902	—	—	—	**1971**	2008
Middlesbrough	—	—	2004	—	—	—	—	—	—	2004
Blackburn Rovers	1995	1928	2002	1912	—	1987	—	—	—	2002
Aston Villa	1981	1957	1996	1981	1901	—	—	—	—	1996
Everton	1987	1995	—	1995	—	—	—	—	—	1995
Leeds United	1992	1972	1968	1992	—	—	—	—	—	1992
Nottingham Forest	1978	1959	1990	1978	—	**1992**	—	—	—	1992
Sheffield Wednesday	1930	1935	1991	1935	1905	—	—	—	—	1991
Wimbledon	—	1988	—	—	—	—	—	—	—	1988
Luton Town	—	—	1988	—	—	—	—	—	—	1988
Reading	—	—	—	—	—	1988	—	—	—	1988
Coventry City	—	1987	—	—	—	—	—	—	—	1987
Oxford United	—	—	1986	—	—	—	—	—	—	1986
Norwich City	—	—	1985	—	—	—	—	—	—	1985
West Ham United	—	1980	—	1964	—	—	—	—	—	1980
Wolverhampton Wanderers	1959	1960	1980	1960	—	—	—	—	—	1980
Ipswich Town	1962	1978	—	—	—	—	—	—	—	1978
Southampton	—	1976	—	—	—	—	—	—	—	1976
Derby County	1975	1946	—	1975	—	—	—	—	—	1975
Burnley	1960	1914	—	1973	—	—	—	—	—	1973
Sunderland	1936	1973	—	1936	1903	—	—	—	—	1973
Stoke City	—	—	1972	—	—	—	—	—	—	1972
Swindon Town	—	—	1969	—	—	—	—	—	1969	1969
West Bromwich Albion	1920	1968	1966	1954	—	—	—	—	—	1968
Queens Park Rangers	—	—	1967	—	—	—	—	—	—	1967
Bolton Wanderers	—	1958	—	1958	—	—	—	—	—	1958
Blackpool	—	1953	—	—	—	—	—	—	—	1953
Charlton Athletic	—	1947	—	—	—	—	—	—	—	1947
Preston North End	1890	1938	—	—	—	—	—	—	—	1938
Cardiff City	—	1927	—	1927	—	—	—	—	—	1927
Huddersfield Town	1926	1922	—	1922	—	—	—	—	—	1926
Sheffield United	1898	1925	—	—	1898	—	—	—	—	1925
Barnsley	—	1912	—	—	—	—	—	—	—	1912
Bradford City	—	1911	—	—	—	—	—	—	—	1911
Brighton & Hove Albion	—	—	—	1910	—	—	—	—	—	1910
Corinthian	—	—	—	—	1904	—	—	—	—	1904
Bury	—	1903	—	—	—	—	—	—	—	1903
Queen's Park	—	—	—	—	1899	—	—	—	—	1899
Notts County	—	1894	—	—	—	—	—	—	—	1894
Blackburn Olympic	—	1883	—	—	—	—	—	—	—	1883
Old Etonians	—	1882	—	—	—	—	—	—	—	1882
Old Carthusians	—	1881	—	—	—	—	—	—	—	1881
Clapham Rovers	—	1880	—	—	—	—	—	—	—	1880
Wanderers	—	1878	—	—	—	—	—	—	—	1878
Royal Engineers	—	1875	—	—	—	—	—	—	—	1875
Oxford University	—	1874	—	—	—	—	—	—	—	1874

== Lower-qualifying honours ==
This section only lists competitions where participating clubs could have qualified for a higher competition instead. See the previous section for other competitions.

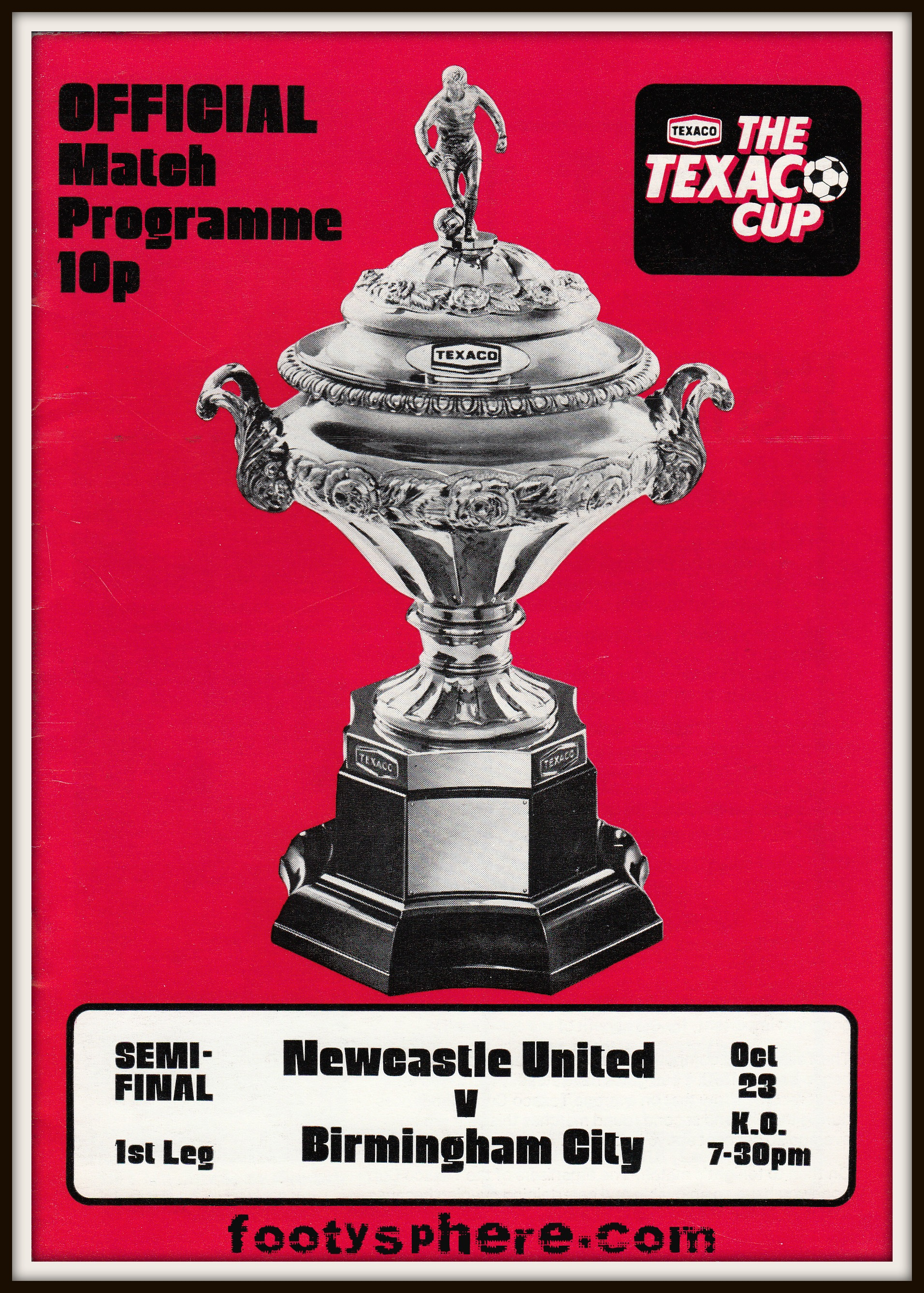
Programme for the 1974–75 Texaco Cup semi-final between Newcastle United and Birmingham City

TC
Texaco Cup (discontinued). Held from 1971 until 1975. By 1975, the Irish and Northern Irish leagues had withdrawn and Texaco's sponsorship ended, so the competition became the Anglo-Scottish Cup below.
ASC
Anglo-Scottish Cup (discontinued). Held from 1975 until 1981. In 1981, the Scottish league withdrew, so the competition became the Football League Group Cup below.
FLGC
Football League Group Cup (discontinued). Held from 1981 until 1983. In 1983, it was replaced by the EFL Trophy (initially named Associate Members' Cup) below.
EFLT
EFL Trophy. Held from 1983-present. Known as the Associate Members' Cup until 1992. Known as the Football League Trophy from 1992 until 2016. (Level 3 to 4 and since 2016-17 season, sixteen Category One academies from level 2 to 1 have taken part in the competition.)
AIC
Anglo-Italian Cup (discontinued). Held from 1970 until 1973 as a professional tournament for clubs who had missed out on UEFA competitions. Revived from 1976 until 1986 as a semi-professional tournament. Revived again from 1992 until 1996 as a professional tournament for teams only from the second tier of the English football league system.
WC
Watney Cup (discontinued). Held from 1970 until 1973.
FAT
FA Trophy. Since 1969. (Level 5 to 8)
FAV
FA Vase. Since 1974. (level 9 to 11)
FAAC
FA Amateur Cup (discontinued). Held from 1893 until 1974, when The FA abolished official amateur status. The FA Vase, above, absorbed most of the clubs that participated in the FA Amateur Cup. (below professional football as defined by FA)
FASC
FA Sunday Cup. Since 1964.(lower than level 11)

Winners of each competition are referenced above. Numbers in bold are record totals for that competition. Trophies that were shared between two clubs are counted as honours for both teams.

Last updated 30 April 2025.

Several lower-qualifying competitions won by men's clubs
Club	TC	ASC	FLGC	EFLT	AIC	WC
Newcastle United	**2**	—	—		**1**	—
Wolverhampton Wanderers	1	—	—	1	—	—
Derby County	1	—	—	—	—	**1**
Ipswich Town	1	—	—	—	—	—
Middlesbrough	—	**1**	—	—	—	—
Nottingham Forest	—	**1**	—	—	—	—
Burnley	—	**1**	—	—	—	—
St Mirren	—	**1**	—	—	—	—
Bristol City	—	**1**	—	**3**	—	—
Chesterfield	—	**1**	—	1	—	—
Millwall	—	—	**1**	—	—	—
Grimsby Town	—	—	**1**	1	—	—
Peterborough United	—	—	—	**3**	—	—
Blackpool	—	—	—	2	**1**	—
Stoke City	—	—	—	2	—	**1**
Carlisle United	—	—	—	2	—	—
Birmingham City	—	—	—	2	—	—
Bolton Wanderers	—	—	—	2	—	—
Luton Town	—	—	—	2	—	—
Port Vale	—	—	—	2	—	—
Rotherham United	—	—	—	2	—	—
Swansea City	—	—	—	2	—	—
Wigan Athletic	—	—	—	2	—	—
Bournemouth	—	—	—	1	—	—
Tranmere Rovers	—	—	—	1	—	—
Barnsley	—	—	—	1	—	—
Coventry City	—	—	—	1	—	—
Crewe Alexandra	—	—	—	1	—	—
Doncaster Rovers	—	—	—	1	—	—
Lincoln City	—	—	—	1	—	—
Mansfield Town	—	—	—	1	—	—
MK Dons	—	—	—	1	—	—
Portsmouth	—	—	—	1	—	—
Southampton	—	—	—	1	—	—
Wrexham	—	—	—	1	—	—
Salford City	—	—	—	1	—	—
Sunderland	—	—	—	1	—	—
Swindon Town	—	—	—	—	**1**	—
Sutton United	—	—	—	—	**1**	—
Notts County	—	—	—	—	**1**	—
Bristol Rovers	—	—	—	—	—	**1**
Colchester United	—	—	—	—	—	**1**

Clubs by FA Trophies won
Club	FAT
Telford United	3
Woking	3
Scarborough	3
Stevenage Borough	2
Macclesfield Town	2
York City	2
Altrincham	2
Stafford Rangers	2
Barrow	2
Grays Athletic	2
Kingstonian	2
Wycombe Wanderers	2
Enfield	2
Kidderminster Harriers	1
Northwich Victoria	1
Wrexham	1
Canvey Island	1
Dagenham	1
FC Halifax Town	1
North Ferriby United	1
Cambridge United	1
Darlington	1
Ebbsfleet United	1
Hednesford Town	1
Burscough	1
Yeovil Town	1
Cheltenham Town	1
Colchester United	1
Wealdstone	1
Bishop's Stortford	1
Matlock Town	1
Morecambe	1
Brackley Town	1
AFC Fylde	1
Harrogate Town	1
Hornchurch	1
Southend United	1

Clubs by FA Vases won
Club	FAV
Whitley Bay	4
Billericay Town	3
Tiverton Town	2
Halesowen Town	2
Brigg Town	2
Stamford	1
Taunton Town	1
Bridlington Town	1
Guiseley	1
South Shields	1
Morpeth Town	1
North Shields	1
Sholing	1
Spennymoor Town	1
Dunston UTS	1
AFC Fylde	1
Truro City	1
Nantwich Town	1
Didcot Town	1
Winchester City	1
Deal Town	1
Whitby Town	1
Arlesey Town	1
Diss Town	1
Wimborne Town	1
Yeading	1
Tamworth	1
Colne Dynamoes	1
St Helens Town	1
Stansted	1
VS Rugby	1
Forest Green Rovers	1
Whickham	1
Blue Star	1
Hoddesdon Town	1
Thatcham Town	1
Chertsey Town	1
Hebburn Town	1
Warrington Rylands	1
AFC Stoneham	1

Clubs by FA Amateur Cups won
Club	FAAC
Bishop Auckland	10
Clapton	5
Crook Town	5
Dulwich Hamlet	4
Bromley	3
Hendon	3
Leytonstone	3
Stockton	3
Enfield	2
Ilford	2
Leyton	2
Middlesbrough	2
Old Carthusians	2
Pegasus	2
Walthamstow Avenue	2
Barnet	1
Bishop's Stortford	1
Casuals	1
Depot Bn., Royal Engineers	1
Kingstonian	1
London Caledonians	1
North Shields	1
Northern Nomads	1
Old Malvernians	1
Oxford City	1
RMLI Gosport	1
Sheffield	1
Skelmersdale United	1
South Bank	1
Walton & Hersham	1
Wealdstone	1
West Hartlepool	1
Willington	1
Wimbledon	1
Woking	1
Wycombe Wanderers	1

Clubs by FA Sunday Cups won
Club	FASC
Hetton Lyons Cricket Club	4
Carlton United	2
Newtown Unity	2
Fantail	2
Humbledon Plains Farm	2
Nicosia	2
St Joseph's (Luton)	2
Oyster Martyrs	2
Ubique United	1
Drovers	1
Leigh Park	1
Vention United	1
Becontree Rovers	1
Fareham Town Centipedes	1
Brandon United	1
Langley Park Rams Head	1
Arras	1
Lobster	1
Dingle Rail	1
Eagle	1
Lee Chapel North	1
Hobbies United	1
Avenue	1
Lodge Cottrell	1
Nexday	1
Almathak	1
Theale	1
Seymour	1
Ranelagh Sports	1
Marston Sports	1
Olympic Star	1
Little Paxton	1
Prestige Brighams	1
Hartlepool Lion Hillcarter	1
Britannia	1
Duke of York	1
Gossoms End	1
Coundon Conservative	1
Scots Grey	1
Campfield	1
New Salamis	1
Hardwick Social	1
Home Bargains	1

== Friendly honours ==
This section only lists friendly competitions.

FLCF
Football League Centenary Festival, also known as the Football League Centenary Tournament (discontinued). A less competitive precursor to the Football League Centenary Trophy above, it had broader entry criteria and 40 minute matches. Also a celebration of the Football League's 100th birthday, it was held during the 1987–88 season.
FLCC
Football League 100th Championship Challenge (discontinued). A friendly competition held at the end of the 1998–99 Football League between the champions of that league and the then record Football League champions. Although the centenary above was ten years earlier, 1998–99 was the 100th season of the Football League because the Football League stopped twice during WWI and WWII).
PLAT
Premier League Asia Trophy. A friendly competition held every other year between 2003 and 2019. Known as the FA Premier League Asia Cup from 2003 to 2007, and the Barclays Asia Trophy from 2007 until 2015.
PLSS
Premier League Summer Series. A friendly competition held for the first time in 2023, involving Premier League sides invited to compete in the United States.

Winners of each competition are referenced above. Numbers in bold are record totals for that competition. Trophies that were shared between two clubs are counted as honours for both teams.

Last updated on 3 August 2025.

Men's clubs by friendly competitions won
Club	FLCF	FLCC	PLAT	PLSS	Total
Chelsea	—	—	**2**	**1**	**3**
Liverpool	—	**1**	1	—	2
Manchester United	—	—	—	**1**	1
Wolverhampton Wanderers	—	—	1	—	1
Arsenal	—	—	1	—	1
Manchester City	—	—	1	—	1
Tottenham Hotspur	—	—	1	—	1
Portsmouth	—	—	1	—	1
Bolton Wanderers	—	—	1	—	1
Nottingham Forest	**1**	—	—	—	1

=== Most recent ===
Years in bold indicate the club that won the honour most recently.

Men's clubs by most recent friendly competitions won
Club	FLCF	FLCC	PLAT	PLSS	All
Manchester United	—	—	—	**2025**	**2025**
Chelsea	—	—	2011	2023	2023
Wolverhampton Wanderers	—	—	**2019**	—	2019
Liverpool	—	**1999**	2017	—	2017
Arsenal	—	—	2015	—	2015
Manchester City	—	—	2013	—	2013
Tottenham Hotspur	—	—	2009	—	2009
Portsmouth	—	—	2007	—	2007
Bolton Wanderers	—	—	2005	—	2005
Nottingham Forest	**1988**	—	—	—	1988

== See also ==
- List of football clubs in England by competitive honours won
- English football clubs in international competitions
- List of English football champions
