= 1905 Sheriff of London Charity Shield =

- Event: Sheriff of London Charity Shield
| Sheffield Wednesday | Corinthian |
| 2 | 1 |
- Date: 24 April 1905
- Venue: The Crystal Palace, London
- Referee: Captain Simpson
- Attendance: 15,000

The 1905 Sheriff of London Charity Shield was the eighth Sheriff of London Charity Shield, contested by Sheffield Wednesday for the first time.

== Pre-match ==
Corinthian made three changes to their lineup compared to the previous year's competition, with O. T. Norris coming in for Rev W. Blackburn at full-back, J. D. Craig for H. A. Lowe at half-back and Gordon Wright for B. O. Corbett at outside left. The Corinthian team was the strongest they could field, while Sheffield Wednesday had their full league team available. Many influential people in the world of football signaled their intention to attend the match with a hope that a "large sum of money" would be taken and available for distribution among hospitals and charitable causes.

== Match ==
The match took place at The Crystal Palace on 24 April 1905, in front of a crowd of 15,000 spectators and with each team at full strength.

Within three minutes, Corinthian scored after a run from Vassall who centered to S. Harris and finished by G. Harris. Corinthian "made many bright attacks afterwards". Sheffield Wednesday nearly equalised shortly after Corinthian's goal, with a shot by Wilson heading over the bar and a further shot by Brittleton well cleared by Corinthian keeper Tom Rowlandson. A "fierce attack ensued" by Sheffield thereafter but the defense held tight. Play was then fairly level throughout the first half, although Sheffield Wednesday had the slight upper hand, yet their forward players did not look particularly threatening in front of the goal, while the Corinthian's had several opportunities to score and may have increased their lead with better shooting. Heading into half-term, Corinthian led by a goal to nil, yet there was little to separate the teams during the first half.

Within the first minute of the second half, Sheffield Wednesday equalised through Wilson and thereafter had the upper hand, although Corinthian held their own for a long period of time thereafter. The pace of the game began taking its toll on Corinthian's players and Sheffield Wednesday scored a further goal 15 minutes before the game's conclusion. Towards the closing stages, Gilbert Vassall moved to inside right from outside right and he and Vassall for Corinthian made a break, but it was ineffective and Sheffield's second goal ultimately sealed the win in what was described as a disappointing second half. Sheffield Wednesday may well have added further to their lead were it not for the good defensive displays from Corthians Norris and Timmis.

Despite the favourable weather conditions, the football being played was described as "rather disappointing", as while it was fast-paced, neither side took their chances well in front of goal and passed too much when in front of the goal. Corinthian's forwards were considered not to be in their best form, although Day and Vassall "did some good things in the early part of the match", while G. Harris also played well. The link up play between S. Harris and Wright did not work well, with the former described as being "disappointing". Of the half-back line, Morgan-Owen was regarded as being the best of the back tree, although not as effective as those on Sheffield Wednesday's team. Rowlandson's goalkeeping was praised and regarded as being "one of the features of the match", having had more to do than his opposite number and making several "really fine" saves. Sheffield Wednesday were ultimately regarded as being deserving champions of the match.

=== Details ===
25 April 1905
15:30

| Sheffield Wednesday | 2–1 | Corinthian |
|---|---|---|
| Wilson 46', 75' | | G. S. Harris 3' |

The Crystal Palace, London
Attendance: 15,000
Referee: Captain Simpson

Sheffield Wednesday
| GK | (Scotland) Jack Lyall |
| RB | (England) Willie Layton |
| LB | (England) Harry Burton |
| RH | (England) Harry Ruddlesdin |
| CH | (England) Tommy Crawshaw |
| LH | Bill Bartlett |
| OR | Harry Davis |
| IR | (England) Tom Brittleton |
| CF | (Scotland) Andrew Wilson |
| IL | (England) James Stewart |
| OL | (England) Vivian Simpson |
Manager:

Corinthian
| GK | (England) Tom Rowlandson |
| LB | (England) W.U. Timmis |
| RB | O. T. Norris |
| RH | J. D. Craig |
| CH | (Wales) Morgan Morgan-Owen (c) |
| LH | H. Vickers |
| OR | (England) Gilbert Vassall |
| IR | S. H. Day |
| CF | (England) G. S. Harris |
| IL | (England) Stanley Harris |
| OL | (England) Gordon Wright |
Manager:
