= List of football clubs in England by competitive honours won =

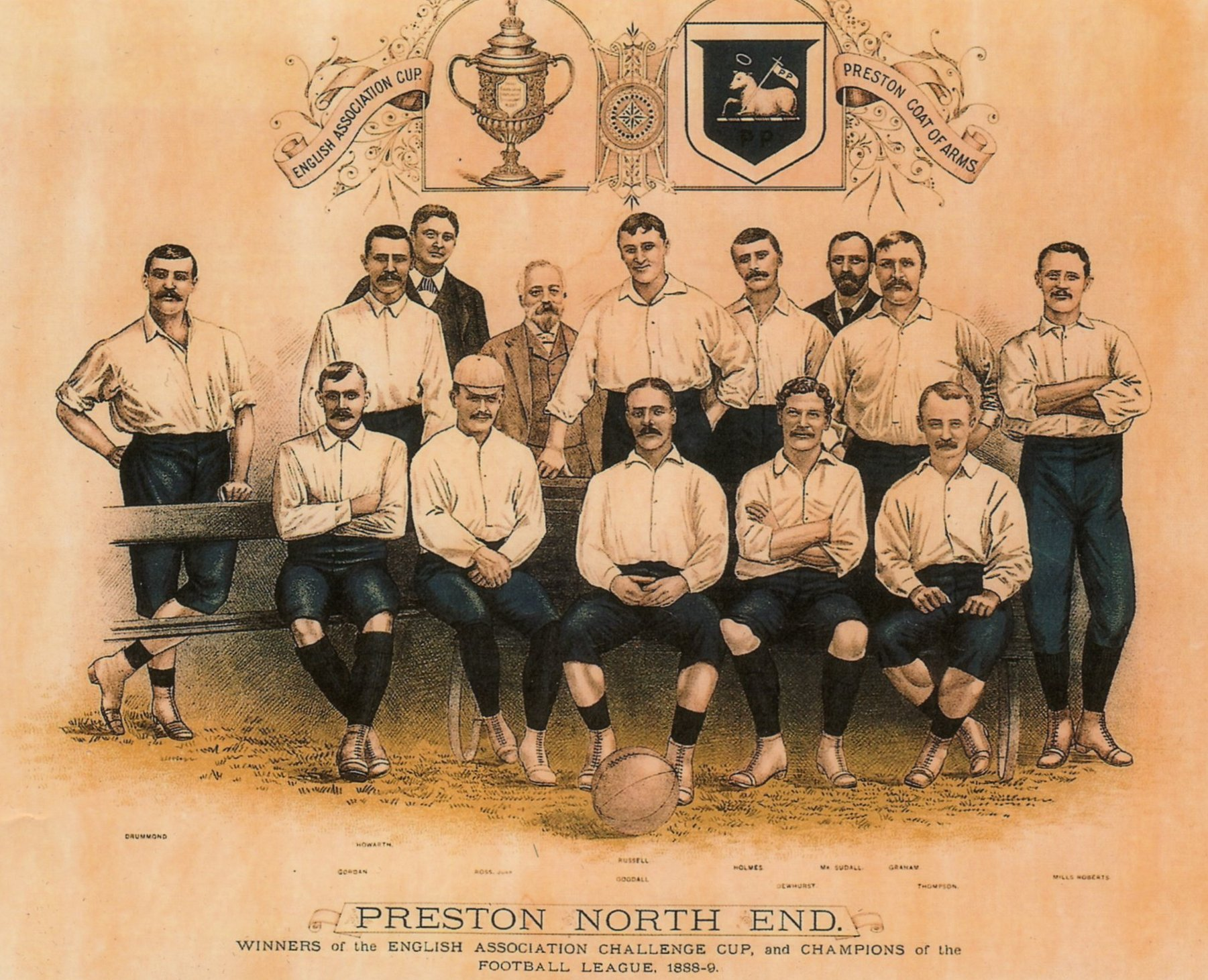
Preston North End in 1888–89, the first Football League champions. They completed the season undefeated and went on to complete the Double by winning the FA Cup.

This article lists English football clubs whose men's sides have won competitive honours run by official governing bodies. Friendly competitions and matches organised between clubs are not included. The football associations FIFA and UEFA run international and European competitions; while The Football Association, and its mostly self-governing subsidiary bodies the English Football League and Premier League, run national competitions.

England's first competition organised by a national body, the FA Cup, began in the 1871–72 season, making it one of the oldest football competitions in the world. Arsenal hold the record number of wins, with 14. League football began in the next decade with the founding of The Football League in 1888–89. The name First Division was adopted in 1892, when The Football League gained a second division. The First Division remained the highest division of the English league system until 1992, when the Premier League was founded. Manchester United and Liverpool have won the most top division titles overall, with 20 each. The first English equivalent of a super cup began in 1898 with the inaugural Sheriff of London Charity Shield that saw the best professional and amateur sides pitted against each other. This pre-season fixture would be replaced by the FA Charity Shield in 1908, which was later renamed the FA Community Shield in 2002. Manchester United also hold the record here, with 21 wins. The Football League created its own knockout competition in 1960, the League Cup. Its current record is ten wins, held by Liverpool. The Anglo-Italian League Cup was created in 1969 to match English cup winners against the winners of the Coppa Italia, but was permanently disbanded in 1976. In 1985, the Full Members' Cup and Football League Super Cup were created as substitutes for UEFA competitions after UEFA banned English clubs for a number of years following the Heysel Stadium disaster. They finished in 1992 and 1986, respectively. The Football League Centenary Trophy marked The Football League's 100th birthday, in the 1988–89 season.

The European governing body UEFA was founded in 1954, and created their first and most prestigious competition, the European Cup, the next year. It was expanded and renamed in 1992 as the UEFA Champions League. Liverpool hold the English record for the most wins, with six. Parallel to UEFA, various officials created the Inter-Cities Fairs Cup in 1955, but the competition was disbanded when UEFA created a replacement tournament, the UEFA Cup, in 1971 (renamed the UEFA Europa League in 2009). The English record for the most UEFA Cup/Europa League wins is three, held by Liverpool and Tottenham. Another competition absorbed into the UEFA Cup, in 1999, was the UEFA Cup Winners' Cup, which was created in 1960 and featured the winners of national knockout competitions. The winners of this competition played the European Cup winners in the UEFA Super Cup, starting in 1972 (recognised by UEFA in 1973), which now features the winners of the Champions League and Europa League. Liverpool hold the English record for the most wins in the UEFA Super Cup, with four. The International Football Cup, also known as the UEFA Intertoto Cup, was a competition for clubs not participating in the European Cup, UEFA Cup or Cup Winners' Cup. The tournament commenced in 1961, but UEFA officially recognised it only in 1995, and discontinued it in 2008, with the Europa League expanded to accommodate Intertoto Cup clubs. UEFA and CONMEBOL also created an intercontinental competition in 1960, the Intercontinental Cup, featuring continental champions from both associations. In 2000, the international governing body FIFA created the FIFA Club World Cup and in 2004 the Intercontinental Cup was merged into it. Manchester United are the only English club to have won the Intercontinental Cup, while United, Liverpool, Chelsea and Manchester City are the only English teams to have lifted the Club World Cup.

Lower down in the hierarchy of English football are many other competitions, not included in the tables on this page. These include tournaments run by the above national governing bodies, but organised for clubs ineligible for higher competitions. Examples include the EFL Trophy. Regional competitions are organised by County Football Associations; in the years when league football was unavailable or only available to northern and midlands clubs, county competitions coexisted with the FA Cup as the main tournaments for clubs. Nowadays, county cups are contested by lower or regional division teams and those that still participate generally field youth or reserve sides.

== Summary totals ==
Numbers in bold are record totals for that category. Clubs in italics are Double winners: they have won two or more of these trophies in the same season (excluding super cups). Trophies that were shared between two clubs are counted as honours for both teams. Clubs tied in total honours are listed chronologically by most recent honour won. See the other tables for breakdowns of each competition won.

Cups here are competitions with a knockout format. Among FIFA and UEFA competitions, these are the UEFA Champions League, the UEFA Europa League, the UEFA Conference League, the Inter-Cities Fairs Cup, the UEFA Cup Winners' Cup, the UEFA Intertoto Cup and the FIFA Club World Cup. Among top-qualifying competitions overseen by The FA, these are the top division, the FA Cup, the League Cup, the Full Members' Cup, the Football League Super Cup and the Football League Centenary Trophy. Super cups consist of honours that have or have had two participating clubs per season. These are the Intercontinental Cup, the UEFA Super Cup, the FA Community Shield and its precursor the Sheriff of London Charity Shield. The Anglo-Italian League Cup is also listed as a super cup since it only had two competing clubs per season as well.

Last updated on 16 August 2026, following Arsenal winning the 2026 FA Community Shield.

Combined totals of English men's clubs
	FIFA and UEFA			FA, EFL and PL (top-qualifying)				Total			Total
Club	Cups	Super cups	Total	League	Cups	Super cups	Total	League	Cups	Super cups	Total
Liverpool	**10**	**4**	**14**	**20**	**19 (Note: Liverpool won the Football League Super Cup in 1986, a one-off competition organised by the Football League to compensate for the UEFA tournament ban which prevented clubs in England from participating in European competitions.)**	17 (Note: Liverpool have won sixteen FA Community Shields and one Sheriff of London Charity Shield in 1906.)	56	**20**	**29**	21	**70**
Manchester United	6	2	8	**20**	**19**	**21**	**60**	**20**	25	**23**	68
Arsenal	2	—	2	14	17 (Note: Arsenal won the Football League Centenary Trophy in 1988, a one-off competition organised by The Football League to celebrate the 100th birthday of the Football League.)	18	49	14	19	18	51
Manchester City	3	1	4	10	17	7	34	10	20	8	38
Chelsea	9	2	11	6	15	4	25	6	24	6	36
Tottenham Hotspur	4	—	4	2	12	9 (Note: Tottenham have won one Sheriff of London Charity Shield in 1902 in addition to seven FA Charity Shield titles, and the Anglo-Italian League Cup, a two-legged tie against Italian cup-winners Torino in 1971.)	23	2	16	9	27
Aston Villa	3	1	4	7	12	3 (Note: Aston Villa have won one FA Community Shield in 1981 and two Sheriff of London Charity Shield trophies in 1899 and 1901.)	22	7	15	4	26
Everton	1	—	1	9	5	9	23	9	6	9	24
Newcastle United	2	—	2	4	7	2 (Note: Newcastle have won one FA Charity Shield in 1909 and one Sheriff of London Charity Shield trophy in 1907.)	13	4	9	2	15
Nottingham Forest	2	1	3	1	8	1	10	1	10	2	13
Wolverhampton Wanderers	—	—	—	3	6	4	13	3	6	4	13
Blackburn Rovers	—	—	—	3	8	1	12	3	8	1	12
Sunderland	—	—	—	6	2	2 (Note: Sunderland have won one FA Charity Shield in 1936 and one Sheriff of London Charity Shield trophy in 1903.)	10	6	2	2	10
Sheffield Wednesday	—	—	—	4	4	2	10	4	4	2	10
Leeds United	2	—	2	3	2	2	7	3	4	2	9
West Bromwich Albion	—	—	—	1	6	2	9	1	6	2	9
West Ham United	3	—	3	—	3	1	4	—	6	1	7
Leicester City	—	—	—	1	4	2	7	1	4	2	7
Sheffield United	—	—	—	1	4	1	6	1	4	1	6
Huddersfield Town	—	—	—	3	1	1	5	3	1	1	5
Portsmouth	—	—	—	2	2	1	5	2	2	1	5
Burnley	—	—	—	2	1	2	5	2	1	2	5
Wanderers	—	—	—	—	5	—	5	—	5	—	5
Bolton Wanderers	—	—	—	—	4	1	5	—	4	1	5
Crystal Palace	1	—	1	—	2	1	3	—	3	1	4
Preston North End	—	—	—	2	2	—	4	2	2	—	4
Derby County	—	—	—	2	1	1	4	2	1	1	4
Ipswich Town	1	—	1	1	1	—	2	1	2	—	3
Corinthian	—	—	—	—	—	3	3	—	—	3	3
Birmingham City	—	—	—	—	2	—	2	—	2	—	2
Bury	—	—	—	—	2	—	2	—	2	—	2
Norwich City	—	—	—	—	2	—	2	—	2	—	2
Old Etonians	—	—	—	—	2	—	2	—	2	—	2
Cardiff City (Note: Cardiff City are a Welsh side who play in the EFL Championship and won the 1926–27 FA Cup and the subsequent 1927 FA Charity Shield.)	—	—	—	—	1	1	2	—	1	1	2
Swindon Town	—	—	—	—	1	1	2	—	1	1	2
Fulham	1	—	1	—	—	—	—	—	1	—	1
Wigan Athletic	—	—	—	—	1	—	1	—	1	—	1
Swansea City (Note: Swansea City are a Welsh side who play in the EFL Championship and won the 2012–13 Football League Cup.)	—	—	—	—	1	—	1	—	1	—	1
Middlesbrough	—	—	—	—	1	—	1	—	1	—	1
Luton Town	—	—	—	—	1	—	1	—	1	—	1
Queens Park Rangers	—	—	—	—	1	—	1	—	1	—	1
Reading	—	—	—	—	1	—	1	—	1	—	1
Wimbledon	—	—	—	—	1	—	1	—	1	—	1
Coventry City	—	—	—	—	1	—	1	—	1	—	1
Oxford United	—	—	—	—	1	—	1	—	1	—	1
Southampton	—	—	—	—	1	—	1	—	1	—	1
Stoke City	—	—	—	—	1	—	1	—	1	—	1
Blackpool	—	—	—	—	1	—	1	—	1	—	1
Charlton Athletic	—	—	—	—	1	—	1	—	1	—	1
Barnsley	—	—	—	—	1	—	1	—	1	—	1
Bradford City	—	—	—	—	1	—	1	—	1	—	1
Notts County	—	—	—	—	1	—	1	—	1	—	1
Blackburn Olympic	—	—	—	—	1	—	1	—	1	—	1
Old Carthusians	—	—	—	—	1	—	1	—	1	—	1
Clapham Rovers	—	—	—	—	1	—	1	—	1	—	1
Royal Engineers	—	—	—	—	1	—	1	—	1	—	1
Oxford University	—	—	—	—	1	—	1	—	1	—	1
Brighton & Hove Albion	—	—	—	—	—	1	1	—	—	1	1
Queen's Park (Note: Queen's Park are a Scottish side who competed in the 1899 Sheriff of London Charity Shield and shared the honour.)	—	—	—	—	—	1	1	—	—	1	1

== FA, EFL and PL (top-qualifying) ==
This section only lists competitions overseen by The FA (and its subsidiary leagues the EFL and Premier League) where there are no higher competitions clubs could participate in instead. See the next section for other competitions run by these bodies. See the main article for winners of friendly competitions run by these bodies.

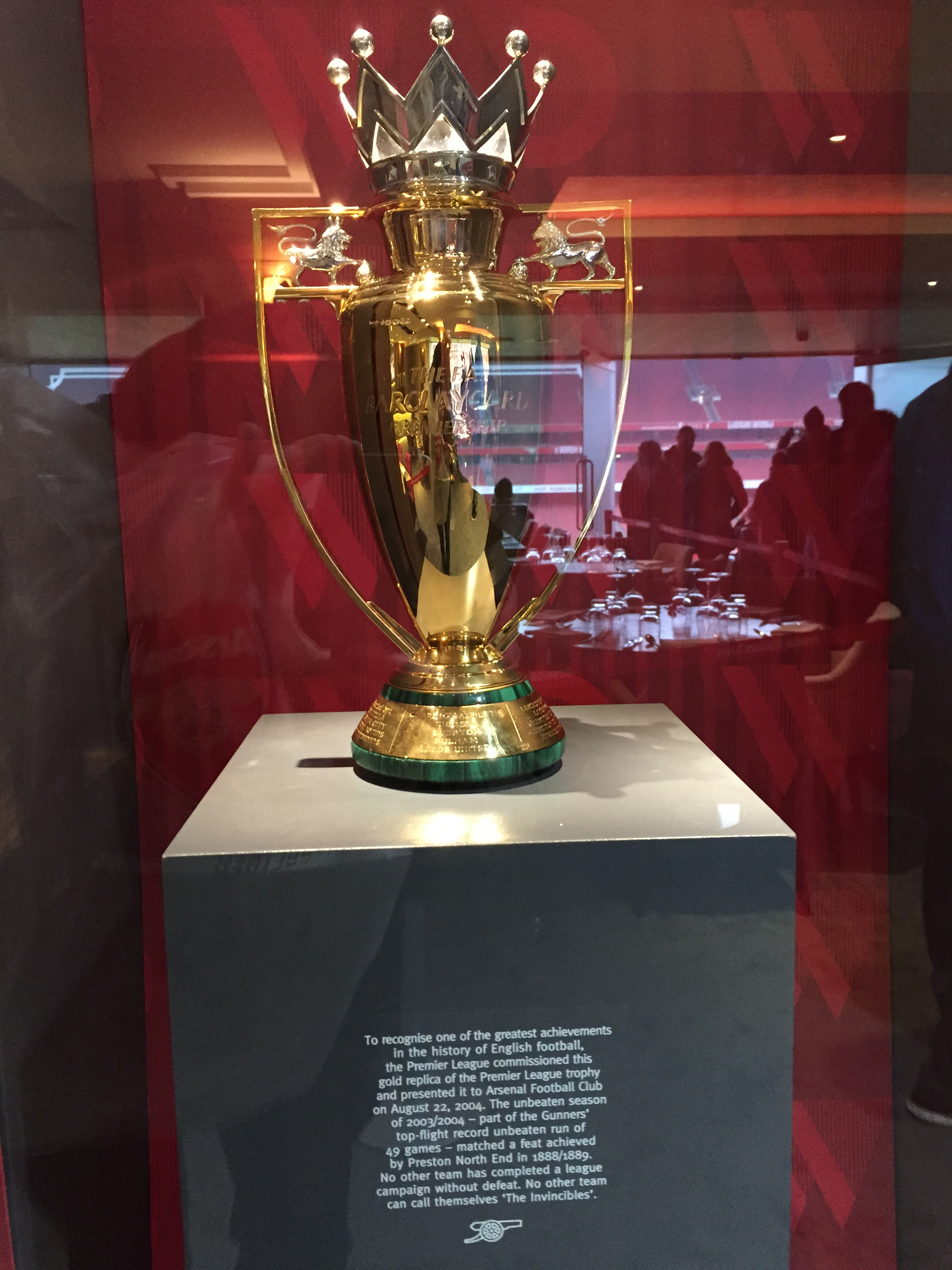
The Premier League trophy. This one is a unique gold colour replica to commemorate Arsenal's completion of the only unbeaten 38-match season.

EFC
English football champions. The Premier League (since 1992) succeeded the Football League First Division (1888 until 1992) as the top-division.
FAC
FA Cup. Since 1871.
EFLC
EFL Cup. Since 1960. Known as the Football League Cup until 2016.
SLCS
Sheriff of London Charity Shield. Discontinued. Held from 1898 to 1907. Predecessor to the FA Community Shield below. The post-1907 fundraising matches for the Shield are not included because they no longer had FA involvement.
FACS
FA Community Shield. Since 1908. Known as the FA Charity Shield until 2002.
FLSC
Football League Super Cup. Discontinued. One-off tournament held between 1985 and 1986.
FMC
Full Members' Cup. Discontinued. Held from 1985 to 1992. For the first season, the Football League Super Cup above was a higher competition for which six best clubs qualified instead, but the season is included here for completeness.
FLCT
Football League Centenary Trophy. Discontinued. Held during the 1988–89 season to celebrate Football League's 100th birthday. The sister tournament, the Football League Centenary Tournament, is not included here because it was a friendly competition with unusual match rules, such as 40-minute matches.
AILC
Anglo-Italian League Cup. Discontinued. Held from 1969 until 1971 and from 1975 until 1976. Also included clubs from Italy.

Winners of each competition are referenced above. Numbers in bold are record totals for that competition. Clubs in italics are Double winners: they have won two or more of the top division, the FA Cup, and the EFL Cup in the same season. Trophies that were shared between two clubs are counted as honours for both teams. Clubs tied in total honours are listed chronologically by most recent honour won.

Last updated on 16 August 2026.

Men's clubs by top-qualifying FA, EFL and PL competitions won
Club	EFC	FAC	EFLC	FACS	SLCS	FMC	FLSC	FLCT	AILC	Total
Manchester United	**20**	13	6	**21**	—	—	—	—	—	**60**
Liverpool	**20**	8	**10**	16	1	—	**1**	—	—	56
Arsenal	14	**14**	2	18	—	—	—	**1**	—	49
Manchester City	10	8	9	7	—	—	—	—	—	34
Chelsea	6	8	5	4	—	**2**	—	—	—	25
Everton	9	5	—	9	—	—	—	—	—	23
Tottenham Hotspur	2	8	4	7	1	—	—	—	**1**	23
Aston Villa	7	7	5	1	2	—	—	—	—	22
Newcastle United	4	6	1	1	1	—	—	—	—	13
Wolverhampton Wanderers	3	4	2	4	—	—	—	—	—	13
Blackburn Rovers	3	6	1	1	—	1	—	—	—	12
Sunderland	6	2	—	1	1	—	—	—	—	10
Sheffield Wednesday	4	3	1	1	1	—	—	—	—	10
Nottingham Forest	1	2	4	1	—	**2**	—	—	—	10
West Bromwich Albion	1	5	1	2	—	—	—	—	—	9
Leeds United	3	1	1	2	—	—	—	—	—	7
Leicester City	1	1	3	2	—	—	—	—	—	7
Sheffield United	1	4	—	—	1	—	—	—	—	6
Bolton Wanderers	—	4	—	1	—	—	—	—	—	5
Huddersfield Town	3	1	—	1	—	—	—	—	—	5
Portsmouth	2	2	—	1	—	—	—	—	—	5
Burnley	2	1	—	2	—	—	—	—	—	5
Wanderers	—	5	—	—	—	—	—	—	—	5
Preston North End	2	2	—	—	—	—	—	—	—	4
West Ham United	—	3	—	1	—	—	—	—	—	4
Derby County	2	1	—	1	—	—	—	—	—	4
Crystal Palace	—	1	—	1	—	1	—	—	—	3
Corinthian	—	—	—	—	**3**	—	—	—	—	3
Ipswich Town	1	1	—	—	—	—	—	—	—	2
Bury	—	2	—	—	—	—	—	—	—	2
Old Etonians	—	2	—	—	—	—	—	—	—	2
Cardiff City	—	1	—	1	—	—	—	—	—	2
Birmingham City	—	—	2	—	—	—	—	—	—	2
Norwich City	—	—	2	—	—	—	—	—	—	2
Swindon Town	—	—	1	—	—	—	—	—	**1**	2
Blackpool	—	1	—	—	—	—	—	—	—	1
Charlton Athletic	—	1	—	—	—	—	—	—	—	1
Wigan Athletic	—	1	—	—	—	—	—	—	—	1
Swansea City	—	—	1	—	—	—	—	—	—	1
Middlesbrough	—	—	1	—	—	—	—	—	—	1
Luton Town	—	—	1	—	—	—	—	—	—	1
Queens Park Rangers	—	—	1	—	—	—	—	—	—	1
Reading	—	—	—	—	—	1	—	—	—	1
Wimbledon	—	1	—	—	—	—	—	—	—	1
Coventry City	—	1	—	—	—	—	—	—	—	1
Oxford United	—	—	1	—	—	—	—	—	—	1
Southampton	—	1	—	—	—	—	—	—	—	1
Stoke City	—	—	1	—	—	—	—	—	—	1
Barnsley	—	1	—	—	—	—	—	—	—	1
Bradford City	—	1	—	—	—	—	—	—	—	1
Brighton & Hove Albion	—	—	—	1	—	—	—	—	—	1
Queen's Park	—	—	—	—	1	—	—	—	—	1
Notts County	—	1	—	—	—	—	—	—	—	1
Blackburn Olympic	—	1	—	—	—	—	—	—	—	1
Old Carthusians	—	1	—	—	—	—	—	—	—	1
Clapham Rovers	—	1	—	—	—	—	—	—	—	1
Royal Engineers	—	1	—	—	—	—	—	—	—	1
Oxford University	—	1	—	—	—	—	—	—	—	1

== FIFA and UEFA ==
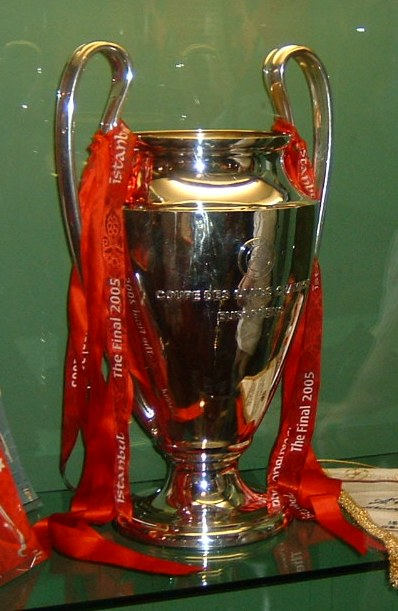
The UEFA Champions League trophy. Liverpool won it for a sixth time in 2019, an English record.

UCL
UEFA Champions League. Since 1955. Known as the European Cup until 1992.
UEL
UEFA Europa League. Since 1971. Known as the UEFA Cup until 2009.
UECL
UEFA Conference League. Since 2021.
USC
UEFA Super Cup. Since 1972. Known as the European Super Cup until 1995. Official since 1973.
ICFC
Inter-Cities Fairs Cup. Discontinued. Held from 1955 to 1971. Although not organised by UEFA, it is included here under UEFA, as it is the predecessor of the UEFA Cup.
UCWC
UEFA Cup Winners' Cup. Discontinued. Held from 1960 until 1999. Known as the European Cup Winners' Cup until 1995. Merged with the UEFA Europa League.
UIC
UEFA Intertoto Cup. Discontinued. Held from 1995 to 2008.
IC
Intercontinental Cup. Discontinued. Held from 1960 to 2004. Although the competition was organised by UEFA and CONMEBOL, it was merged into the FIFA Club World Cup, and the winners are recognised by FIFA as club world champions.
FIC
FIFA Intercontinental Cup. Since 2024.
FCWC
FIFA Club World Cup. Since 2000.

Winners of each competition are referenced above. Numbers in bold are English record totals for that competition. Trophies that were shared between two clubs are counted as honours for both teams. Clubs tied in total honours are listed chronologically by most recent honour won.

Last updated on 27 May 2026.

English men's clubs by FIFA and UEFA honours won
Club	UCL	UEL	UECL	USC	ICFC	UCWC	UIC	IC	FCWC	Total
Liverpool	**6**	**3**	—	**4**	—	—	—	—	1	**14**
Chelsea	2	2	**1**	2	—	**2**	—	—	**2**	11
Manchester United	3	1	—	1	—	1	—	**1**	1	8
Aston Villa	1	1	—	1	—	—	**1**	—	—	4
Tottenham Hotspur	—	**3**	—	—	—	1	—	—	—	4
Manchester City	1	—	—	1	—	1	—	—	1	4
Nottingham Forest	2	—	—	1	—	—	—	—	—	3
West Ham United	—	—	**1**	—	—	1	**1**	—	—	3
Arsenal	—	—	—	—	1	1	—	—	—	2
Leeds United	—	—	—	—	**2**	—	—	—	—	2
Newcastle United	—	—	—	—	1	—	**1**	—	—	2
Ipswich Town	—	1	—	—	—	—	—	—	—	1
Crystal Palace	—	—	**1**	—	—	—	—	—	—	1
Everton	—	—	—	—	—	1	—	—	—	1
Fulham	—	—	—	—	—	—	**1**	—	—	1

== FA, EFL and PL (lower-qualifying) ==
In addition to the honours listed in the section above, England's football governing bodies have also organized a variety of less prominent competitions for clubs not eligible for the honours above. One example is the Texaco Cup (or International League Board Competition), which was available for top division sides that had not qualified for Europe, and was one of the few attempts to create a cross-border competition between clubs from the various nations of the UK and Ireland. Another is the EFL Trophy, which involves clubs from League One and League Two (the third and fourth tiers of the English football league system). Since 2016–17 season, sixteen Category One academies from Championship and Premier League have taken part in the competition.

== County FAs ==
English football also has a network of regional governing bodies known as County Football Associations. These associations are roughly based around county lines, although some cover multiple counties or the boundaries of major cities. They generally have a Senior Cup, such as the Kent Senior Cup or Middlesex Senior Cup, as their premier competition for men's clubs. In some cases, such as the Kent and Middlesex Senior Cups, these involve the senior first-teams of lower-division or regional-division clubs; in other cases it can have other formats, such as the Manchester Senior Cup, which became a reserve team competition for six large clubs from the region. In the years when league football was unavailable or only available to northern and midlands clubs, the Senior Cups coexisted with the FA Cup as the main tournaments for clubs.

== See also ==
- List of FA and league honours won by men's clubs
- English football clubs in international competitions
- List of football clubs by competitive honours won
- List of English football champions
