= Tom Rowlandson =

English footballer (1880–1916)

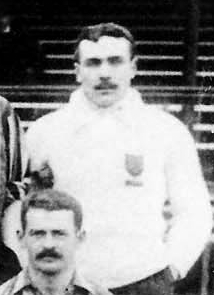
- Rowlandson while with Old Carthusians in 1903

Personal information
- Full name: Thomas Sowerby Rowlandson
- Date of birth: 22 February 1880
- Place of birth: Newton Morrell, England
- Date of death: 15 September 1916 (aged 36)
- Place of death: Flers-Courcelette, France
- Position: Goalkeeper

Senior career*
| Years | Team | Apps | (Gls) |
| –1902 | Cambridge University | | |
| 1902–1907 | Corinthian | | |
| 1902–1903 | Preston North End | 0 | (0) |
| 1903–1904 | Sunderland | 12 | (0) |
| 1905–1906 | Newcastle United | 1 | (0) |
- Old Carthusians
- Darlington

International career
| 1906–1907 | England Amateurs | 2 | (0) |
- * Club domestic league appearances and goals

Thomas Sowerby Rowlandson MC (22 February 1880 – 15 September 1916) was an English amateur footballer who played in the Football League for Sunderland and Newcastle United as a goalkeeper. He represented the England amateur national team.

== Career ==
Rowlandson signed for Newcastle from Sunderland in October 1905, expecting to secure a permanent place in the team and more regular appearances. He would only make a single league appearance for Newcastle in October 1905, where they beat Nottingham Forest 3–2.

== Personal life ==
Rowlandson attended Charterhouse School and Trinity College was a Cambridge University blue. After the breakout of the First World War in August 1914, he gave over his farmhouse for use as a hospital supply depot. Rowlandson subsequently enlisted in the British Army in Northallerton and was commissioned as a lieutenant in the Yorkshire Regiment on 5 September 1914. By 17 April 1915, he was on the Western Front, fighting in the Second Battle of Ypres. By 1 January 1916, he had been promoted to captain, mentioned in dispatches and won the Military Cross. Rowlandson was killed after being hit in the shoulder by a German grenade on 15 September 1916, during the Battle of Flers–Courcelette. He was buried at Bécourt Military Cemetery.

== Career statistics ==
Appearances and goals by club, season and competition
| Club | Season | League | | | FA Cup | | Other | | Total | |
| Club | Season | Division | Apps | Goals | Apps | Goals | Apps | Goals | Apps | Goals |
|---|---|---|---|---|---|---|---|---|---|---|
| Corinthian | 1903–04 | — | | | | | 1 (Note: Appearances in Sheriff of London Charity Shield) | 0 | 1 | 0 |
| Corinthian | 1904–05 | — | | | | | 1 | 0 | 1 | 0 |
| Corinthian | 1905–06 | — | | | | | 1 | 0 | 1 | 0 |
| Corinthian | 1906–07 | — | | | | | 1 | 0 | 1 | 0 |
| Corinthian | Total | | — | | — | | 4 | 0 | 4 | 0 |
| Sunderland | 1903–04 | First Division | 3 | 0 | 0 | 0 | — | | 3 | 0 |
| Sunderland | 1904–05 | First Division | 9 | 0 | 0 | 0 | — | | 9 | 0 |
| Sunderland | Total | | 12 | 0 | 0 | 0 | — | | 12 | 0 |
| Newcastle United | 1905–06 | First Division | 1 | 0 | 0 | 0 | — | | 1 | 0 |
| Career total | | | 13 | 0 | 0 | 0 | 4 | 0 | 17 | 0 |

== Honours ==
Corinthian

- Sheriff of London Charity Shield: 1904
