= Bécourt =

Bécourt may refer to the following places in France:

- Bécourt, Pas-de-Calais, a commune in the Pas-de-Calais department
- Bécourt, a village in the Somme department destroyed in the First World War, now part of the commune of Bécordel-Bécourt
