= Morgan Morgan-Owen =

Welsh footballer

Personal information
- Full name: Morgan Maddox Morgan-Owen
- Date of birth: 20 February 1877
- Place of birth: Hereford, England
- Date of death: 14 August 1950 (aged 73)
- Place of death: Willington, England
- Positions: Wing half; centre forward

Senior career*
Years	Team	Apps	(Gls)
- Oxford University
1898–1913	Corinthian		
1900	Nottingham Forest	1	(0)
1903–1913	Casuals		
1903–1905	Glossop	3	(0)
- London Welsh
- Rhyl
- Oswestry

International career
1897–1907	Wales	12	(2)
- * Club domestic league appearances and goals

Morgan Maddox Morgan-Owen DSO (20 February 1877 – 14 August 1950) was a Welsh amateur footballer who played in the Football League for Glossop and Nottingham Forest as a wing half. He won 12 caps and scored two goals for Wales between 1897 and 1907 and had a long career with each of the tour leading amateur clubs of the period, Corinthian and Casuals.

== Personal life ==
Morgan-Owen's brother Hugh was also a Welsh international footballer. He was educated at Colet School, Shrewsbury School and Oriel College, Oxford and gained an honours degree in Modern History from the latter institution. After the First World War, he continued his career as a schoolteacher at Repton School (1909–1937) and also served as diplomatic private secretary. He married Doris Marjorie Turner in 1925 and had three children.

== First World War ==
Morgan-Owen enlisted in the Essex Regiment in 1905 and served as a major with the regiment during the First World War, seeing action at Gallipoli, Langemarck, Cambrai and the German spring offensive. He also had two periods attached to the Rifle Brigade, the second as an acting lieutenant colonel commanding the 10th (Service) Battalion. Morgan-Owen was awarded the DSO in August 1918:

For conspicuous gallantry and devotion to duty. On the occasion of the enemy attack, when his battalion was in reserve, he moved it up to resist the attack and held on to the position for two days, though the troops on his flank were pressed back. His steadfast determination to hold his ground against repeated attacks and under heavy fire largely contributed to restoring and keeping in hand the critical situation which had arisen.

— The Edinburgh Gazette, Issue 13305, 19 August 1918

Morgan-Owen was wounded and gassed during the war and an injury to his arm resulted in the end of his sporting career.

== Career statistics ==
Appearances and goals by club, season and competition
Club	Season	League			National Cup		Other		Total	
Club	Season	Division	Apps	Goals	Apps	Goals	Apps	Goals	Apps	Goals
Nottingham Forest	1900–01	First Division	1	0	0	0	—		1	0
Corinthian	1902–03	—					1 (Note: Appearances in Sheriff of London Charity Shield)	0	1	0
Corinthian	1903–04	—					1	0	1	0
Corinthian	1904–05	—					1	0	1	0
Corinthian	1905–06	—					1	0	1	0
Corinthian	1906–07	—					1	0	1	0
Corinthian	Total		—		—		5	0	5	0
Glossop	1903–04	Second Division	1	0	0	0	—		1	0
Glossop	1904–05	Second Division	1	0	0	0	—		1	0
Glossop	1905–06	Second Division	1	0	0	0	—		1	0
Glossop	Total		3	0	0	0	—		3	0
Career total			4	0	0	0	5	0	9	0

== Honours ==
Corinthian

- Sheriff of London Charity Shield: 1904

Casuals

- London Charity Cup: 1903–04, 1904–05
- AFA Senior Cup: 1907–08, 1912–1913

Wales

- British Home Championship: 1906–07

== See also ==
- List of Wales international footballers (alphabetical)
