= Bert Gosnell =

English footballer (1880–1972)

Personal information
- Full name: Albert Arthur Gosnell
- Date of birth: 10 February 1880
- Place of birth: Colchester, Essex, England
- Date of death: 6 January 1972 (aged 91)
- Place of death: Norwich, England
- Height: 5 ft 10 in (1.78 m)
- Position: Outside left

Youth career
- The Albion (Colchester)

Senior career*
Years	Team	Apps	(Gls)
- Colchester Town
1901–1902	New Brompton		
1902–1904	Chatham		
1904–1910	Newcastle United	106	(15)
1910–1911	Tottenham Hotspur	5	(0)
1911–1912	Darlington		
1912–1913	Port Vale	23	(1)
Total		134+	(16+)

International career
1906	England	1	(0)

Managerial career
- 1921–1926: Norwich City
- * Club domestic league appearances and goals

Albert Arthur Gosnell (10 February 1880 – 6 January 1972) was an England international footballer who played in two FA Cup finals for Newcastle United in the early 20th century and later managed Norwich City.

An outside-left, he began his career with local club Colchester Town before joining Newcastle United following spells with New Brompton and Chatham. He featured in the 1905 and 1906 FA Cup finals, both of which ended in defeat. During his time at Newcastle, the club won the First Division title three times: 1904–05, 1906–07 and 1908–09. In 1910, he had a brief spell at Tottenham Hotspur before moving on to Darlington. He ended his career after spending the 1912–13 season with Port Vale. During his time with Newcastle, he won one cap for England in February 1906.

He took his first and only management job at Norwich City in 1921. He took charge of 233 games in five years, maintaining a winning record of just over 25%.

== Early and personal life ==
Albert Arthur Gosnell was born on 10 February 1880 in Colchester, Essex. He was the youngest of nine children to Edward Jo and Annie Maria (née Hyam); his father was a harness maker and saddler. Outside of football he worked as an engine fitter and was married to Margaret Helen Brownlow in Newcastle upon Tyne in December 1909. He had two sons, Leslie and John Gosnell and one stepson, George Watson Brownlow. After retiring from football, he became the licensed victualler of The Raven in Norwich.

== Club career ==
Gosnell, an outside-left, played for Colchester-based non-League teams The Albion and Colchester Town, before joining New Brompton in 1901. After playing in the Southern League for New Brompton, he moved on to Kent League club Chatham the following year. He joined Newcastle United in May 1904 and helped the "Magpies" to win the Football League First Division title in 1904–05. He also played in the 1905 FA Cup final at Crystal Palace, which ended in a 2–0 defeat to Aston Villa following two goals from Harry Hampton. United finished fourth in the league in 1905–06 and again reached the final of the FA Cup. Gosnell again picked up a runners-up medal following a 1–0 defeat to Everton after a goal from Alex Young.

Newcastle again won the Football League title in 1906–07, finishing three points ahead of Bristol City. They dropped back to fourth in 1907–08 before finishing as champions again in 1908–09 with a seven-point lead over second-place Everton. Once more, they could only manage a fourth-place finish in defence of their title in the 1909–10 campaign, Gosnell's last at the club. They did, though, win the FA Cup for the first time in 1910 after beating Barnsley in a replay at Goodison Park; Gosnell did not feature though in either the original tie or the replay. He made 106 appearances and scored 15 goals in six years at St James' Park.

On 7 July 1910, Gosnell signed for Tottenham Hotspur. He featured in seven matches in all competitions. He only had a brief spell at White Hart Lane, before he went on to play at Northern League club Darlington in 1911. In the summer of 1912, he signed with Port Vale, who at the time were plying their trade in the Central League. He appeared fairly regularly throughout the 1912–13 season, though on 9 November, in a match at Liverpool Reserves, he was mistakenly sent off for kicking an opponent during a 1–0 defeat. He was a member of the side that took home the Birmingham Senior Cup in 1913 but left the club in the summer of that year.

== International career ==
Gosnell earned an England cap on 17 February 1906, in a 5–0 win over Ireland.

== Management career ==
Gosnell was Norwich City's seventh manager, replacing Charles O'Hagan in charge at The Nest in January 1921. The "Canaries" finished 15th in the Third Division South in 1921–22. They went on to finish 18th in 1922–23, 11th in 1923–24, 12th in 1924–25, and 16th in 1925–26. They regularly reached the fourth round of the FA Cup, though he exited in his last season in charge at the first round stage. He was replaced as manager by former boss Bert Stansfield in early 1926.

== Career statistics ==
=== Playing statistics ===
Appearances and goals by club, season and competition
Club	Season	League			FA Cup		Other		Total	
Club	Season	Division	Apps	Goals	Apps	Goals	Apps	Goals	Apps	Goals
Newcastle United	1904–05	First Division	25	4	8	2	0	0	33	6
Newcastle United	1905–06	First Division	35	8	8	1	0	0	43	9
Newcastle United	1906–07	First Division	26	3	1	0	1	0	28	3
Newcastle United	1907–08	First Division	8	0	0	0	0	0	8	0
Newcastle United	1908–09	First Division	5	0	0	0	0	0	5	0
Newcastle United	1909–10	First Division	7	0	1	0	0	0	8	0
Newcastle United	Total		106	15	18	3	1	0	125	18
Tottenham Hotspur	1910–11	First Division	5	0	2	0	0	0	7	0
Port Vale	1912–13	Central League	23	1	4	4	0	0	27	5

=== Managerial statistics ===
Managerial record by team and tenure
Team	From	To	Record				
Team	From	To	P	W	D	L	Win %
Norwich City	1921	1926	233	59	79	95	25.3
Total			233	59	79	95	25.3

== Honours ==
Newcastle United

- Football League First Division: 1904–05, 1906–07 & 1908–09
- FA Cup runner-up: 1905 & 1906
- Sheriff of London Charity Shield: 1907

Port Vale

- Birmingham Senior Cup: 1913

England

- British Home Championship: 1905–06 (shared)
