= Jack Almond =

English footballer

Personal information
- Full name: John Almond
- Date of birth: 6 November 1876
- Place of birth: Darlington, England
- Position: Forward

Senior career*
Years	Team	Apps	(Gls)
- Bishop Auckland
1894–1896	Darlington		
1896–1901	Sheffield United	109	(21)
1901	Gainford		
1901–1903	Millwall Athletic		
1904–1905	Leeds City		
1905	Bradford City	0	(0)
1905–1906	Doncaster Rovers		(8)
- * Club domestic league appearances and goals

John Almond (born 6 November 1876) was an English footballer who played as a forward. Born in Darlington, County Durham, he spent the majority of his career in and around the Yorkshire area with spells at Leeds City, Bradford City, Doncaster Rovers and Sheffield United where he played over 100 games, winning the First Division championship in 1898 and gaining an FA Cup winners medal having scored in the 1899 final.

== Playing career ==
Almond started his career playing in his local area and soon came to prominence whilst at Darlington, leading him to be signed by Sheffield United. Whilst in Yorkshire Almond was initially a regular in the side, with his goals helping The Blades to be crowned English champions in 1898 and win the FA Cup in 1899, having scored United's third goal in the final. However a loss of form led to him losing his first team place and he was overlooked when United reached the FA Cup final again in 1901.

Disappointed to be frozen out of the team Almond quit the club and professional football to take over a pub in Gainford near his home town of Darlington. After a few months as a publican and playing for the local amateur side he returned to senior football signing for Millwall Athletic before returning to Yorkshire for spells at Leeds City, Bradford City and Doncaster Rovers. He later turned out for Doncaster GNER.

== Personal life ==
Almond was the son of a wealthy Yorkshire brewer and was reported to have inherited between £6,000 and £12,000 when his father died in 1897 - a huge sum of money for the time. After he finished playing it was reported that he was working in the Doncaster locomotive works in 1910 but there is little evidence of what happened to him after that. It was initially reported that he had died in Liverpool in 1912 but there were two reports in the Sheffield press of him attending a game in Leeds in 1931, stating that he was the assistant manager of the Griffin Hotel in the city and was set to move to run a hotel in Bangor in North Wales.

== Career statistics ==
Jack Almond at the English National Football Archive (subscription required)

Club	Season	League			FA Cup		Other		Total	
Club	Season	Division	Apps	Goals	Apps	Goals	Apps	Goals	Apps	Goals
Sheffield United	1896–97	Division One	20	5	0	0	—		20	5
Sheffield United	1897–98	Division One	20	8	1	0	1 (Note: Appearance in Sheriff of London Charity Shield)	1	22	9
Sheffield United	1898–99	Division One	14	1	6	1	—		20	2
Sheffield United	1899–1900	Division One	30	2	5	1	—		35	3
Sheffield United	1900–01	Division One	25	5	1	0	—		26	5
Sheffield United	Total		109	21	13	2	1	1	123	24

== Honours ==
Sheffield United

- Division One

- Champions: 1898
- Runners-up: 1900

- FA Cup
  - Winner: 1899
- Sheriff of London Charity Shield
  - Winner (shared): 1898
