= Vivian Simpson =

Vivian Simpson may refer to:

- Vivian Simpson (politician) (1903–1977), politician in Northern Ireland
- Vivian Simpson (footballer) (1883–1918), English amateur football forward
- Vivian V. Simpson (1903–1987), American lawyer
