= 1898 AAA Championships =

Outdoor track and field competition

- Dates: 2 July 1898
- Host city: London, England
- Venue: Stamford Bridge (stadium)
- Level: Senior
- Type: Outdoor
- Events: 14

The 1898 AAA Championships was an outdoor track and field competition organised by the Amateur Athletic Association (AAA), held on Saturday 2 July 1898 at the Stamford Bridge (stadium) in London, England, in front of 7,000 spectators.

The 14 events were the same number as in the previous year and all 14 event disciplines remained the same.

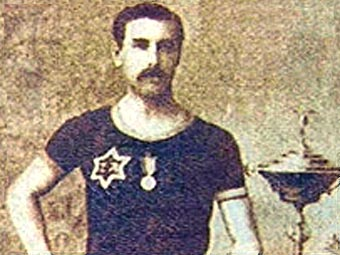
Bennett successfully defended his 4 miles title

== Results ==
Event	Gold		Silver		Bronze	
100 yards	Frederick Cooper	10.0 =NR	Norman Morgan (N Ireland)	inches	Reginald Wadsley	inches
440 yards	William Fitzherbert	50.0	(Leinster) James Meredith	½ yd	Charles Davison	½ yd
880 yards	Albert Relf	1:56.2	William Lutyens	4 yd	Alan Hunter	10 yd
1 mile	(Scotland) Hugh Welsh	4:17.2	William Lutyens	16-20 yd	D. G. Harris	4:32.0
4 miles	Charles Bennett	20:14.4	(Scotland) Henry Munro	25 yd	Jason Tennant	100 yd
10 miles	Sidney Robinson	53:12.0	Charles Bennett	53:18.0	Edward Barlow	53:22.0
steeplechase	(Canada) George Orton	11:48.4	Charles Lee	80 yd	A.E. Williamson	20 yd
120yd hurdles	Howard Parkes	16.4	(Leinster) Tom Kiely	3 yd	(Leinster) Patrick Harding	
4 miles walk	William Sturgess	29:10.0	Jack Butler	30:15.8	G. Topliss	30:41.0
high jump	(Leinster) Patrick Leahy	1.819	Robert Perry & Henry Adair	1.753	not awarded	
pole jump	James Poole	3.12	E. C. Pritchard	3.07	A. Fraser	2.66
long jump	(Leinster) William Newburn	7.19 NR	Gilbert Vassall	6.60	Edmund Faunce de Laune	6.45
shot put	(Leinster) Denis Horgan	13.71	Nigel Harrison	11.44	R. E. Bascombe	9.88
hammer throw	(Leinster) Tom Kiely	42.70	(Leinster) Denis Horgan	38.28	Walter Lawrence	33.50
