= Wilfrid Foster =

English cricketer and Army officer

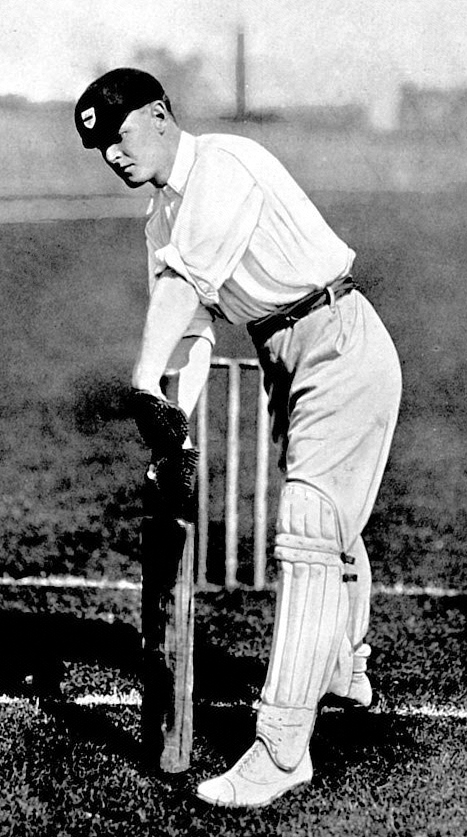
- Foster pictured in around 1900

Personal information
- Full name: Wilfrid Lionel Foster
- Born: 2 December 1874; Great Malvern, Worcestershire, England
- Died: 22 March 1958 (aged 83); Shifnal, Staffordshire, England
- Batting: Right-handed
- Role: Batsman
- Relatives: Foster brothers

Domestic team information
- Years: Team
- 1898–1911: Worcestershire

Career statistics
Competition	First-class
Matches	38
Runs scored	1,993
Batting average	30.66
100s/50s	3/11
Top score	113
Balls bowled	5
Wickets	0
Bowling average	–
5 wickets in innings	–
10 wickets in match	–
Best bowling	–
Catches/stumpings	18/–
- Source: CricInfo, 23 April 2023

Major Wilfrid Lionel Foster CBE, DSO (2 December 1874 – 22 March 1958) was an English Army officer and a first-class cricketer: a right-handed batsman who played for Worcestershire County Cricket Club in their early years as a first-class team. He was one of the seven Foster brothers, all of whom played first-class cricket for the county. Foster also appeared for Marylebone Cricket Club (MCC) and the Gentlemen. He was also an amateur footballer, turning out for Corinthian.

== Military career ==
Born in Great Malvern, Worcestershire, like his brothers Foster was educated at Malvern College before going to the Royal Military Academy and being commissioned into the Royal Artillery in November 1894. He was promoted to Lieutenant on 17 November 1897, and served in the Second Boer War 1900–1901, during which he was promoted Captain on 16 January 1901. He was seconded for a staff appointment in South Africa as Deputy Assistant Adjutant-General in April 1902. He later served in World War I, for which he won the Distinguished Service Order (DSO).

== Cricket ==
Foster made his first-class debut for Worcestershire in 1899, against Yorkshire in Worcestershire's first ever match at that level, though he had a personally unmemorable game in scoring 0 and 22. However, the season as a whole was a success for him: he made 1,041 runs in all, and topped Worcestershire's batting averages with 42.57. Against Hampshire, both he and his brother Tip scored a century in each innings; Wilfrid scored 140 and 172 not out, the former being his maiden first-class century, and the latter being his highest first-class score.

Foster played three first-class matches (none for Worcestershire) in 1900, but was then out of the game for several years owing to his service in the Boer War. He returned to first-class cricket in 1903, but never again played more than a handful of games in a season. From July 1908 he was employed by the Birmingham-based glassmaking company of Chance Brothers, which might explain his only very moderate success with the bat. His last match was in 1911 against Middlesex.

== Other sports ==
In addition to his cricketing accomplishments, Foster was a fine rackets player, winning the Public Schools racquets championship with his brother, H. K. Foster, in 1892 and the Amateur Doubles Championship on two occasions.

He also played for renowned amateur football side Corinthian, for whom he scored their only goal in the 1898 Sheriff of London Charity Shield replay against Football League winners Sheffield United which resulted in the sides sharing the honour in a 1–1 draw.

Foster died at the age of 83 in Ryton Grove, near Shifnal, Staffordshire.
