= Bécourt Military Cemetery =

WWI CWGC cemetery in Somme, France

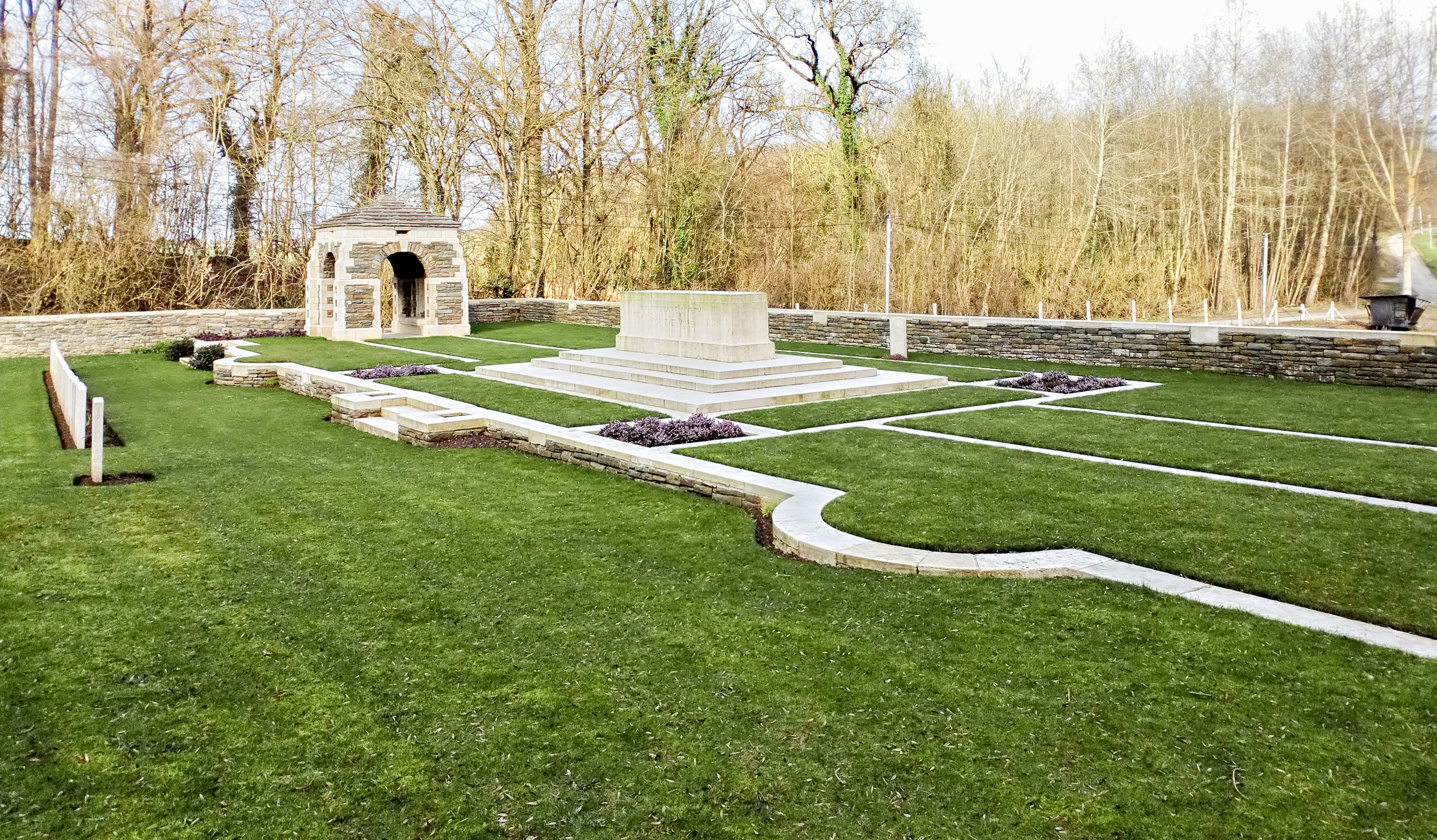

Details
- Established: August 1915
- Location: Bécordel-Bécourt, Somme, France
- Country: British and Commonwealth
- Coordinates: 50°00′14″N 2°41′01″E
- Type: Military
- Owned by: Commonwealth War Graves Commission (CWGC)
- No. of graves: 713 total, 5 unidentified
- Website: Official website
- Find a Grave: Bécourt Military Cemetery

The Bécourt Military Cemetery is a cemetery located in the Somme region of France commemorating British and Commonwealth soldiers who fought in the Battle of the Somme in World War I. The cemetery contains those who died in a variety of dates from August 1915 to April 1917 manning the front line near the village of Bécordel-Bécourt and is managed by the Commonwealth War Graves Commission.

== Location ==
The cemetery is located on the southern side of the Rue de Becourt, the road linking the village of Becourt to the town of Albert, France. It is on the western edge of Becourt Wood. The village of Becourt is located approximately 2 kilometers east of Albert.

== Establishment of the cemetery ==
=== History ===
The cemetery was begun in August 1915 by the 51st Highland Division and was used by other divisions near the front line until the beginning of the Battle of the Somme in July 1916. During and after the battle, until April 1917, the cemetery was used by nearby field ambulances. In August 1918, Plot II was started by the 18th Division. Three German graves have been removed from the cemetery since its inception.

=== Layout ===
The cemetery covers an area of 4327 square meters and is enclosed by a rubble wall.

=== Statistics ===
There are a total of 713 World War I casualties buried in the cemetery, of which 5 are unidentified. A special memorial is dedicated to a British soldier believed to be buried among the unknown.

Eighteen Yorkshire Regiment soldiers are buried in the cemetery, including 12 officers.

Identified Burials by Nationality
Nationality	Number of Burials
United Kingdom	602
Australia	72
Canada	31
South Africa	3

Number of Burials by Unit
Australian burials	72	Northumberland Fusiliers	65
Royal Field Artillery	38	Royal Berkshire Regiment	32
Canadian burials	31	Royal West Kent Regiment	30
Queen's – Royal West Surrey Regiment	27	Royal Engineers	27
Essex Regiment	25	Highland Light Infantry	20
Royal Garrison Artillery	19	Royay Scots – Lothian Regiment	19
Durham Light Infantry	18	Green Howards – Yorkshire Regiment	17
Suffolk Regiment	17	Buffs – East Kent Regiment	16
Black Watch	15	King's Own Yorkshire Light Infantry	15
Royal Irish Rifles	12	Cameron Highlanders	11
Royal Warwickshire Regiment	11	Seaforth Highlanders	11
Gordon Highlanders	9	Machine Gun Corps	9
Lincolnshire Regiment	8	Argyll & Sutherland Highlanders	7
East Lancashire Regiment	7	Border Regiment	6
Duke of Wellington's – West Riding Regiment	6	Gloucestershire Regiment	6
Royal Fusiliers – City of London Regiment	6	Royal Sussex Regiment	6
Royal Welsh Fusiliers	6	West Yorkshire Regiment	6
Loyal North Lancashire Regiment	5	Nottinghamshire & Derbyshire Regiment	5
Rifle Brigade	5	Royal Army Medical Corps	5
Cameronians – Scottish Rifles	4	King's Liverpool Regiment	4
Royal Army Service Corps	4	Bedfordshire Regiment	3
King's Royal Rifle Corps	3	London Regiment – 22nd Bn. The Queen's	3
South African burials	3	York & Lancaster Regiment	3
East Yorkshire Regiment	2	London Regiment – 7th Bn.	2
London Regiment – 18th Bn. London Irish Rifles	2	Northamptonshire Regiment	2
Royal Scots Fusiliers	2	South Wales Borderers	2
Welsh Regiment	2	Cheshire Regiment	1
Connaught Rangers	1	Devonshire Regiment	1
East Surrey Regiment	1	Leinster Regiment	1
London Regiment – 8th Bn. Post Office Rifles	1	London Regiment – 15th Bn. Civil Service Rifles	1
London Regiment – 17th Bn. Poplar & Stepney Rifles	1	London Regiment – 19th Bn. St. Pancras	1
London Regiment – 23rd Bn.	1	Norfolk Regiment	1
Somerset Light Infantry	1	South Staffordshire Regiment	1
Worcestershire Regiment	1		
