= 1898 Sheriff of London Charity Shield =

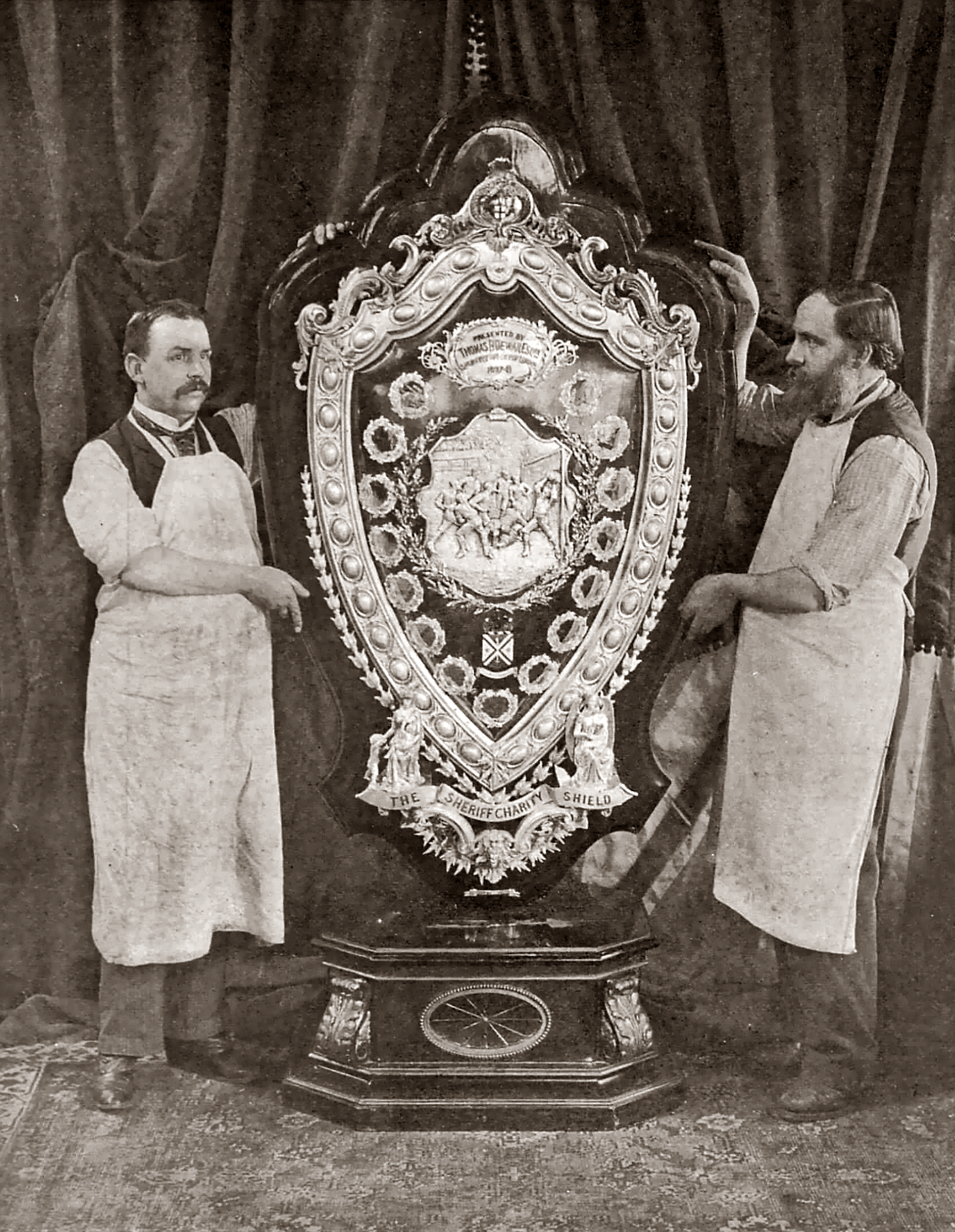
- Event: Sheriff of London Charity Shield
Corinthian	Sheffield United
0	0
Corinthian	Sheffield United
- Date: 19 March 1898
- Venue: The Crystal Palace, London
- Referee: Mr. E. E. Stuart
- Attendance: 20,000

Replay
Corinthian	Sheffield United
1	1
- Date: 4 April 1898
- Venue: The Crystal Palace, London
- Referee: Mr. E. E. Stuart
- Attendance: 7,000

The 1898 Sheriff of London Charity Shield was the first edition of the Sheriff of London Charity Shield. The match and subsequent replay were both drawn and hence the honour was shared between Corinthian and Sheffield United. The shield was the largest of its kind ever modelled, measuring 5 feet 9 inches (1.75 m) in height and 3 feet 4 inches (1.02 m) wide.

== Match ==
=== Background ===
The contest was proposed by Sir Thomas Dewar who was a Sheriff of London in 1897 and part of the organising committee. Sheffield United F.C. were league champions for the first time in their history in the 1897–98 Football League and Corinthian were the premier amateur side of the time providing many of the England national football team players.

Prior to the match, Dewar offered to present 15 carat gold medals of an appropriate design to each member of the winning team, coupled with badges of the same metal composition to the committee.

=== First-half ===
The first half was a very defensive encounter, partly due to the wet pitch. The referee Mr E.E. Stuart pulled up players from both sides for a large number of fouls. Corinthians were mostly forced into their own half for the initial period of the game due to the brilliant performances of Sheffield's Needham, Morren and Johnson at half-back.

=== Second-half ===
The second half saw more attacking play with strong showings from Corinthian's Smith and Burnup, however, the Sheffield backs Thickett and Cain were their match defensively.

=== Details ===
19 March 1898
4:00pm

Corinthian	0–0	Sheffield United

The Crystal Palace, London
Attendance: 20,000
Referee: Mr. E.E. Stuart

GK	(England) W. Campbell
Back	(England) C. B. Fry
Back	(England) W. J. Oakley
Half	(England) B. Middleditch
Half	(England) C. Wreford-Brown
Half	(England) F. M. Ingram
Forward	(England) R. C. Gosling
Forward	(England) W. F. H. Stanborough
Forward	(England) G. O. Smith
Forward	(England) C. L. Alexander
Forward	(England) C. J. Burnup

GK	(England) Foulkes
Back	(England) Thickett
Back	(Scotland) Cain
Half	(England) Johnson
Half	(England) Morren
Half	(England) Needham
Forward	(England) Bennett
Forward	(Scotland) McKay
Forward	(England) Gaudie
Forward	(England) Cunningham
Forward	(England) Priest

== Replay ==
=== Background ===
The sides were largely unchanged with two changes for each to the initial lineups. Topham and W. L. Foster came in for Corinthian replacing Stanborough and Ingram. For Sheffield United, forwards Almond and Hedley replaced McKay and Gaudie.

=== First-half ===
Sheffield United scored first with a goal from their forward Almond following a pass from Cunningham, shortly before half-time. Cunningham won the ball and got it into the centre on goal, before a mistake by Corinthian defender C. B. Fry let Almond score with an open goal. Sheffield appeared content after scoring their goal a few minutes before the end of the first half, given their strong defensive showing.

=== Second-half ===
Corinthian had a strong start to the second half, assisted by a breeze that worked in their favour. A half-hour into the second half, Corinthian's Topham was fouled near the goal mouth by Cain, and a free kick was given, although was delayed being taken due to time spent in arranging what positions the players would take. Once taken and kicked to safety, the whistle was blown and ordered to be retaken due to encroachment. The placement of the ball the second time was unfavourable to Sheffield United and the kick resulted in a goal scored by W. L. Foster. The game was again a strong defensive showing from both sides and at the end of 90 minutes Sheffield United refused to play extra time, with the club president alleging unfairness shown by the referee as an excuse, resulting in the honour being shared.

=== Post match ===
The play was described as not being particularly exciting, attributed to players being "evidently stale" following the original match the week before.

=== Details ===
4 April 1898
4:00pm

Corinthian	1–1	Sheffield United
Foster		Almond

The Crystal Palace, London
Attendance: 7,000
Referee: Mr. E. E. Stuart

GK	(England) W. Campbell
Back	(England) C. B. Fry
Back	(England) W. J. Oakley
Half	(England) B. Middleditch
Half	(England) C. Wreford-Brown
Half	(England) W. L. Foster
Forward	(England) R. C. Gosling
Forward	(England) R. Topham
Forward	(England) G. O. Smith
Forward	(England) C. L. Alexander
Forward	(England) C. J. Burnup

GK	(England) Foulkes
Back	(England) Thickett
Back	(Scotland) Cain
Half	(England) Johnson
Half	(England) Morren
Half	(England) Needham
Forward	(England) Bennett
Forward	(England) Hedley
Forward	(England) Almond
Forward	(England) Cunningham
Forward	(England) Priest
