= Football League 100th Championship Challenge =

- The match programme cover
Sunderland	Liverpool
2	3
- Date: 18 May 1999
- Venue: Stadium of Light, Sunderland
- Referee: Mike Reed
- Attendance: 18,111

The Football League 100th Championship Challenge was a football match organised by the Football League and played to commemorate the 100th edition of the Football League First Division being completed. It was played between the winners of the competition's 100th edition, and the record winners of the competition at the time. It was held at the Stadium of Light on 18 May 1999, two days after the end of the Premier League season. The match was played between Sunderland, champions of the 1998–99 Football League First Division (the second-tier of English football at the time), and Liverpool, 18-time Football League champions (all first-tier titles).

Sunderland took an early lead through Allan Johnston's curling effort, but a penalty from Robbie Fowler and a close-range finish from Jamie Redknapp put Liverpool 2–1 in front. Sunderland brought the game back level via a Kevin Phillips header, but the Reds restored their lead within a minute when Paul Ince saw his deflected shot hit the back of the net. This proved to be the decisive goal as Liverpool won 3–2 to claim the glass trophy in front of a crowd of 18,111.

== Background ==
The match was announced in a press conference on 30 April 1999 in the presence of Sunderland manager Peter Reid and Liverpool manager Gerard Houllier, to celebrate 100 editions of the Football League First Division. The game was scheduled for 18 May 1999, two days after Liverpool's final match in the 1998–99 Premier League. The match was billed as being Steve McManaman's final game in a Liverpool shirt as he was to join Real Madrid at the end of the season, however McManaman was forced to withdraw due to the death of his mother. The winners of the game were to receive a trophy made from glass, while the match was also given its own logo featuring the colours blue, red and white. Liverpool's line-up for the game was: Brad Friedel, Rigobert Song, Dominic Matteo, Phil Babb, Jamie Carragher, Jamie Redknapp, Paul Ince, David Thompson, Patrik Berger, Karl-Heinz Riedle and Robbie Fowler.

== Match ==
=== Details ===
18 May 1999
20:00 BST

Sunderland	2–3	Liverpool
Johnston 3'; Phillips 76'	Report	Fowler 38' (pen.); Redknapp 67'; Ince 77'

Stadium of Light, Sunderland
Attendance: 18,111
Referee: Mike Reed

Sunderland	Liverpool

== Post-match ==
Sunderland manager Peter Reid expressed worry about the potential length of the injury suffered by their top scorer Kevin Phillips during the game, stating "We are just hoping it's a few torn fibres instead of a full-blown hamstring tear". Phillips was able to recover in time for the following season where he would end up winning the Premier League Golden Boot and the European Golden Shoe.

== See also ==
- 1998–99 FA Premier League
- 1998–99 Football League First Division
- 1998–99 FA Cup
- 1998–99 Football League Cup
