= 1907 Sheriff of London Charity Shield =

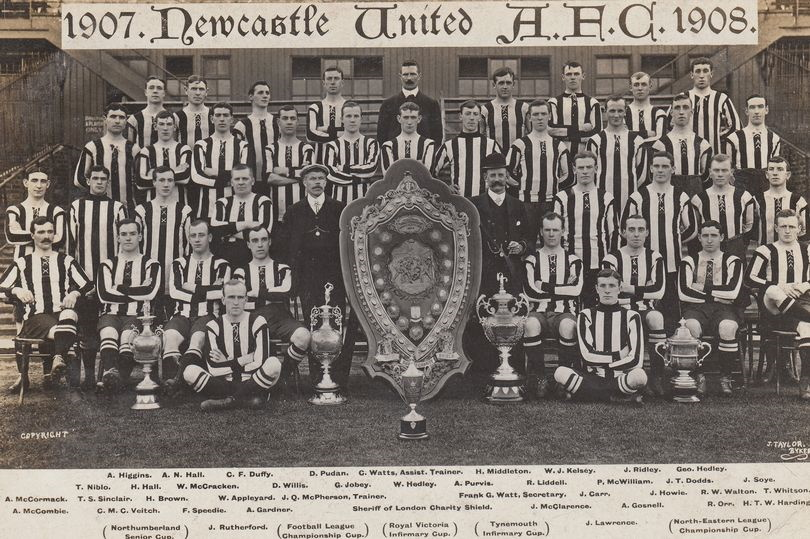
- Event: Sheriff of London Charity Shield
Newcastle United	Corinthian
5	2
- Date: 9 March 1907
- Venue: Craven Cottage, Fulham
- Referee: Patrick R. Harrower
- Attendance: 30,000
- Weather: Rain

The 1907 Sheriff of London Charity Shield was the tenth and final Sheriff of London Charity Shield, Newcastle United convincingly defeated the leading amateur side Corinthian 5–2. It was replaced the next season by the FA Charity Shield. The match was however revived a few times later in the 20th century for fundraising purposes.

== Background ==
Newcastle United F.C. were league champions for the second time in their history in the 1906–07 Football League and Corinthian were the premier amateur side of the time providing many England national football team players.

Corinthian's goalkeeper Tom Rowlandson had also played for Newcastle and Sunderland in the seasons prior, making a single league appearance for Newcastle in October 1905, where they beat Nottingham Forest 3–2.

It was the second time of the year that Newcastle had played Corinthian, the first being their annual match on 2 January at St James's Park, in which Newcastle won 3–0 in front of a poor attendance of 5,000.

== Match ==
Newcastle sent 14 players to London to compete in the match, although did not choose the starting line-up until the morning of the match. The admission cost was sixpence.

Despite the weather, where it rained for the entirety of the game, the match was described as "a great success". During the first half, the tabloids reported that "it was anybody's game, but the professionals were able to stay the pace longer than their opponents", suggesting that Newcastle were able to win relatively easily.

Although it was acknowledged that Newcastle deserved the win, it was disputed that they deserved a win by a three-goal margin, particularly as Corinthians "held their own" in the first half and went into half-term with the score 1–1. Fatigue and fitness reduced their effectiveness of pace, while lack of training with the amateurs compared to the physically fit professional Newcastle side cost showed as the game wore on. The opening stage of the match had been contested with "tremendous pace" which ultimately took its toll on Corinthians, with weak finishing and a tired defense. Out of all the amateurs, only the half-backs appeared as fit at the game's conclusion as when it commenced, while Timmins and Norris had "rarely played better". Goalkeeper Tom Rowlandson made "many fine saves", although did not have much chance of saving the five goals he let in.

Due to what was described as an "enormous crowd", the takings for the match equaled around £1,000 (equivalent to £139,000 in 2024) that was donated to charitable causes.

=== Details ===
9 March 1907
15:15 GMT

Corinthian	2–5	Newcastle United
R.A. Young; G.S. Harris		Rutherford; Appleyard; Brown (2); Timmis (o.g.)

Craven Cottage, London
Attendance: 30,000
Referee: Mr. Patrick R. Harrower

GK	(England) Tom Rowlandson
Back	(England) W.U. Timmis
Back	(England) O.T. Norris
Half	(England) Geoffrey Foster
Half	(Wales) Morgan Morgan-Owen
Half	(England) Kenneth Hunt
Forward	(England) R.A. Young
Forward	(England) C.D. McIver
Forward	(England) Stanley Harris
Forward	(England) G.S Harris
Forward	(England) Bertie Corbett

GK	(Scotland) Jimmy Lawrence
Back	(Ireland) Bill McCracken
Back	(England) John Carr
Half	(Scotland) Alexander Gardner
Half	(Scotland) Finlay Speedie
Half	(Scotland) Peter McWilliam
Forward	(England) Jock Rutherford
Forward	(Scotland) James Howie
Forward	(England) Bill Appleyard
Forward	(England) Harry Brown
Forward	(England) Albert Gosnell

=== Aftermath ===
The Shield in its first iteration came to an end after this match in 1907 due to a rift within the Football Association which saw the creation of the Amateur Football Association. The Shield was replaced in 1908 by the FA Charity Shield which rather than the best amateur side pitted the Football League winner against the winners of the Southern Football League and then later against the winner of the FA Cup.
