= Gilbert Vassall =

English cricketer (1876–1941)

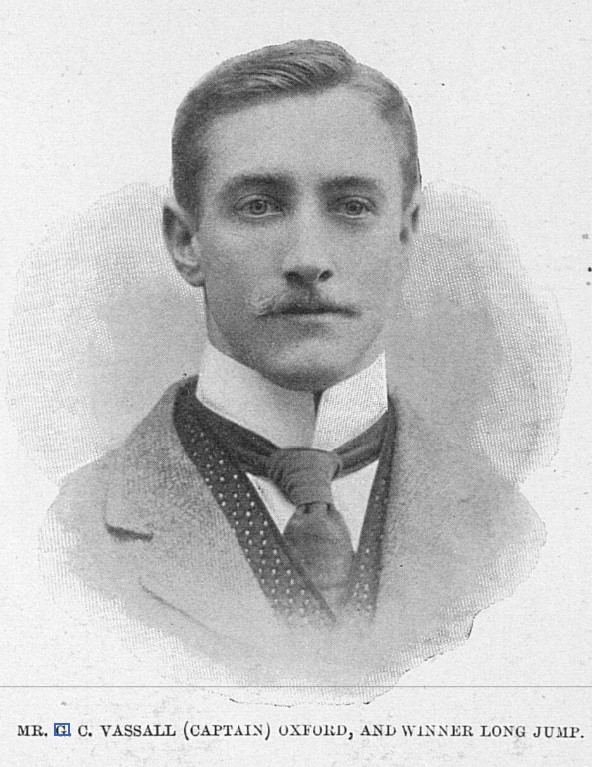
- Vassall in 1899

Personal information
- Full name: Gilbert Claude Vassall
- Born: 5 April 1876; Hardington Mandeville, Somerset, England
- Died: 19 September 1941 (aged 65); Park Town, Oxford, England
- Bowling: Right-arm fast

Domestic team information
- Years: Team
- 1902–1905: Somerset

Career statistics
Competition	FC
Matches	6
Runs scored	46
Batting average	5.11
100s/50s	0/0
Top score	27*
Balls bowled	114
Wickets	1
Bowling average	72.00
5 wickets in innings	0
10 wickets in match	0
Best bowling	1/56
Catches/stumpings	4/–
- Source: CricketArchive, 22 December 2015

Gilbert Claude Vassall (5 April 1876 – 19 September 1941) was an English cricketer who played first-class cricket for Somerset in six matches between 1902 and 1905. He was born at Hardington Mandeville, Somerset and died at Oxford.

== Biography ==
Vassall was the son of the rector of Hardington Mandeville. His older brother was Harry Vassall. He was educated at Charterhouse School and at Oriel College, Oxford and he played cricket for his college but not for the university side.

His fame at Oxford was as a long jumper, and he was the champion for three consecutive years from 1897 to 1899 in the Varsity athletic match against Cambridge University, his jump of 23 feet and three inches in 1899 being only two inches short of the then record, held by C. B. Fry. He finished second in the long jump event at the 1898 AAA Championships.

On leaving the university, Vassall became a schoolmaster at the Dragon School in Oxford, remaining there until his death, by which time he was joint headmaster. In the school holidays in 1902, 1903 and 1905, he played a few cricket matches for Somerset as a lower-order batsman and right-arm fast bowler. In his first game, against Surrey, he joined Peter Randall Johnson with Somerset needing 65 for victory with three wickets to fall and hit an unbeaten 27 to take his side to success. But in his five other matches for Somerset over the next three years he only made 19 other runs and his only wicket came in 1905 when, as the seventh bowler used, he finally broke a stand of 261 by the Kent second wicket pair Ted Dillon and James Seymour.

== Marriages ==
On 7 January 1902, Gilbert married Rosa Mary Cotter at Holy Trinity Church, Yeovil. She was the daughter of William Laurence Cotter (the rector of West Coker, Somerset, from 1880 to 1898) and his first wife, Edith Wood (a Black Country heiress). Gilbert and Rosa lived at 181 Banbury Road, Oxford, for four years and then moved to 11 Charlbury Road, Oxford.

When Rosa died on 9 March 1928, aged 49, she left her husband the income on her estate for life.

On 1 August 1929, Gilbert married Brenda Elizabeth Ferrall at Little Horsted, East Sussex. She was the daughter of the Rev. Henry John Ferrall of Heckingham, Norfolk. By 1929, Brenda had changed her name to "O'Ferrall," which was probably the version used by her Irish ancestors. She and Gilbert had one daughter.
