= Ralph Gaudie =

English footballer

Personal information
- Date of birth: 1876
- Place of birth: Guisborough, England
- Date of death: 1951 (aged 74–75)
- Position: Centre forward

Senior career*
Years	Team	Apps	(Gls)
- South Bank
1897–1898	Sheffield United	6	(2)
1898–1899	Aston Villa	5	(1)
1899–1901	Woolwich Arsenal	47	(23)
1903–1904	Manchester United	7	(0)
- * Club domestic league appearances and goals

Ralph Gaudie (1876 – 1951) was an English footballer who played as a centre forward. His playing career with Aston Villa has in some sources been wrongly attributed to a brother, Richard Gaudie, who has subsequently been shown not to have existed.

Gaudie was born in Guisborough, Yorkshire and first signed for his local club South Bank, before making the step up to professionalism with Sheffield United. He played six times and scored twice in the 1897–98 season as United won the First Division title, but did not pick up a winners' medal.

In August 1898 he joined Aston Villa and played five times for them scoring one goal in the 1898-99 season as Villa too won the First Division title. He thus became the first player to play for different clubs in consecutive League championship winning seasons.

He moved to Second Division Woolwich Arsenal in October 1899, where he became a regular straight away, and ended the season as Arsenal's top scorer with fifteen goals (including a hat-trick in Arsenal's record league victory, 12–0 against Loughborough). Gaudie's 1900–01 season was blighted by illness and injury, yet he was still the club's top scorer for a second season in a row, this time with eight goals. His ill health did not improve, and on medical advice he quit the game in the summer of 1901. In all he played 50 matches for Arsenal, scoring 23 goals.

However, he made a brief comeback with Manchester United two years later, and played eight matches in the course of the 1903–04 season. However, he did not score any goals, and decided to quit football for a second time at the end of that season. He later moved to South Africa, seeking a warmer climate due to his poor health; there he became a journalist.
