= Stanley Harris (footballer) =

English footballer and cricketer

Personal information
- Full name: Stanley Shute Harris
- Date of birth: 19 July 1881
- Place of birth: Sea Mills, Bristol, England
- Date of death: 4 May 1926 (aged 44)
- Place of death: Farnham, Surrey, England
- Position: Inside left

Senior career*
Years	Team	Apps	(Gls)
- Cambridge University
- Old Westminsters
1903–1910	Corinthian	60	(57)
1905–1907	Portsmouth		
- Worthing

International career
1904–1906	England	6	(2)
1906	England Amateurs	1	(7)
- * Club domestic league appearances and goals

Stanley Shute Harris (19 July 1881 – 4 May 1926) was an English footballer who represented and captained the England national football team. He also played first-class cricket for various clubs, appearing in a total of 16 first-class matches.

== Personal life ==
Stanley Harris was the son of Charles Alexander Harris. He was educated at Westminster School and Pembroke College, Cambridge.

== Football career ==
Harris captained England in four of his six internationals. He made his debut in 1904 when the English defeated Scotland 1–0 and the following year wore the captain's armband for the first time in a 1–1 draw with Ireland. In 1905 he also played an international against Wales, not as captain, and scored one of England's three goals. His last three internationals came in 1906 and he captained his country in all of them, including a 5–0 demolition of Ireland at the Solitude Ground where he scored a goal. He played club football at Cambridge University and with Old Westminsters; he was also a member of the Corinthian club, making 60 appearances between 1903 and 1910, scoring 57 goals including five in an 11–3 victory over a Manchester United side on 26 November 1904. He appeared once for England Amateurs, captaining the side in their inaugural international, in 1906, against France. The match, which is recognized as a full international by the French FA, was won by England 15–0, and Harris scored seven times.

== Cricket career ==
In his cricket career Harris scored 375 runs at 14.42, with two half centuries. He started off playing at Cambridge University, from 1902 to 1904 and in the first of those years also played a first-class match for Gloucestershire in the County Championship. In a 1904 University Match involving Cambridge, he switched sides and played with Surrey. During the same season he also appeared in a match for London County and in 1919, after a 15-year absence from first-class cricket, Harris played three matches at Sussex

== Teaching career ==
Professionally, Harris was a schoolmaster. He was head of St Ronan's School from 1909 until his death from cancer, aged 44, in 1926.
