= Vivian Simpson (footballer) =

English footballer

Personal information
- Full name: Vivian Sumner Simpson
- Date of birth: 1883
- Place of birth: Sheffield, England
- Date of death: 13 April 1918 (aged 34–35)
- Place of death: Outtersteene, Belgium
- Position: Forward

Senior career*
Years	Team	Apps	(Gls)
1900	Sheffield		
1900–1906	The Wednesday	30	(8)
- Sheffield
1907	Norwich City		
- Northern Nomads
–1909	Sheffield		
- * Club domestic league appearances and goals

Vivian Sumner Simpson MC (1883 – 13 April 1918) was an English amateur footballer who played in the Football League for The Wednesday as a forward. He is most notable for his time in non-League football with Sheffield, for whom he scored over 100 goals in over 200 appearances.

== Personal life ==
Simpson attended Wesley College, Sheffield and later worked for his father as a solicitor. He served in the York and Lancaster Regiment during the First World War and was awarded the Military Cross and mentioned in dispatches in September 1917:

For conspicuous gallantry and devotion to duty during and after an attack upon enemy trenches. He was the first to reach the trench, and to be engaged in hand-to-hand fighting with the enemy. Later, he displayed the greatest ability and energy in organising his company for the work of protection and consolidation. His work has been consistently excellent on previous occasions.

— The London Gazette, Supplement 13143 (19 September 1917)

Between November 1916 and February 1917, Simpson was promoted from a temporary second lieutenant to acting captain, while commanding his company. He was promoted to acting captain and to command his company again in April 1917. In September 1917, Simpson was invalided back to Britain after suffering wounds and was posted to a role training junior officers in Sunderland. He later returned to the front and was killed by a sniper "while selflessly dashing through the darkness to check on his comrades" on 13 April 1918 at Outtersteene, near Ploegsteert, Belgium. He was buried in Outtersteene Communal Cemetery Extension.

== Career statistics ==
Appearances and goals by club, season and competition
Club	Season	League			FA Cup		Total	
Club	Season	Division	Apps	Goals	Apps	Goals	Apps	Goals
The Wednesday	1901–02	First Division	5	2	0	0	5	2
The Wednesday	1902–03	First Division	3	0	0	0	3	0
The Wednesday	1903–04	First Division	7	2	5	3	12	5
The Wednesday	1904–05	First Division	6	2	0	0	6	2
The Wednesday	1905–06	First Division	1	0	0	0	1	0
The Wednesday	1906–07	First Division	8	2	3	0	11	2
Career total			30	8	8	3	38	11

== Honours ==
Sheffield

- FA Amateur Cup: 1903–04
