= Bécourt, Pas-de-Calais =

Bécourt
- Commune
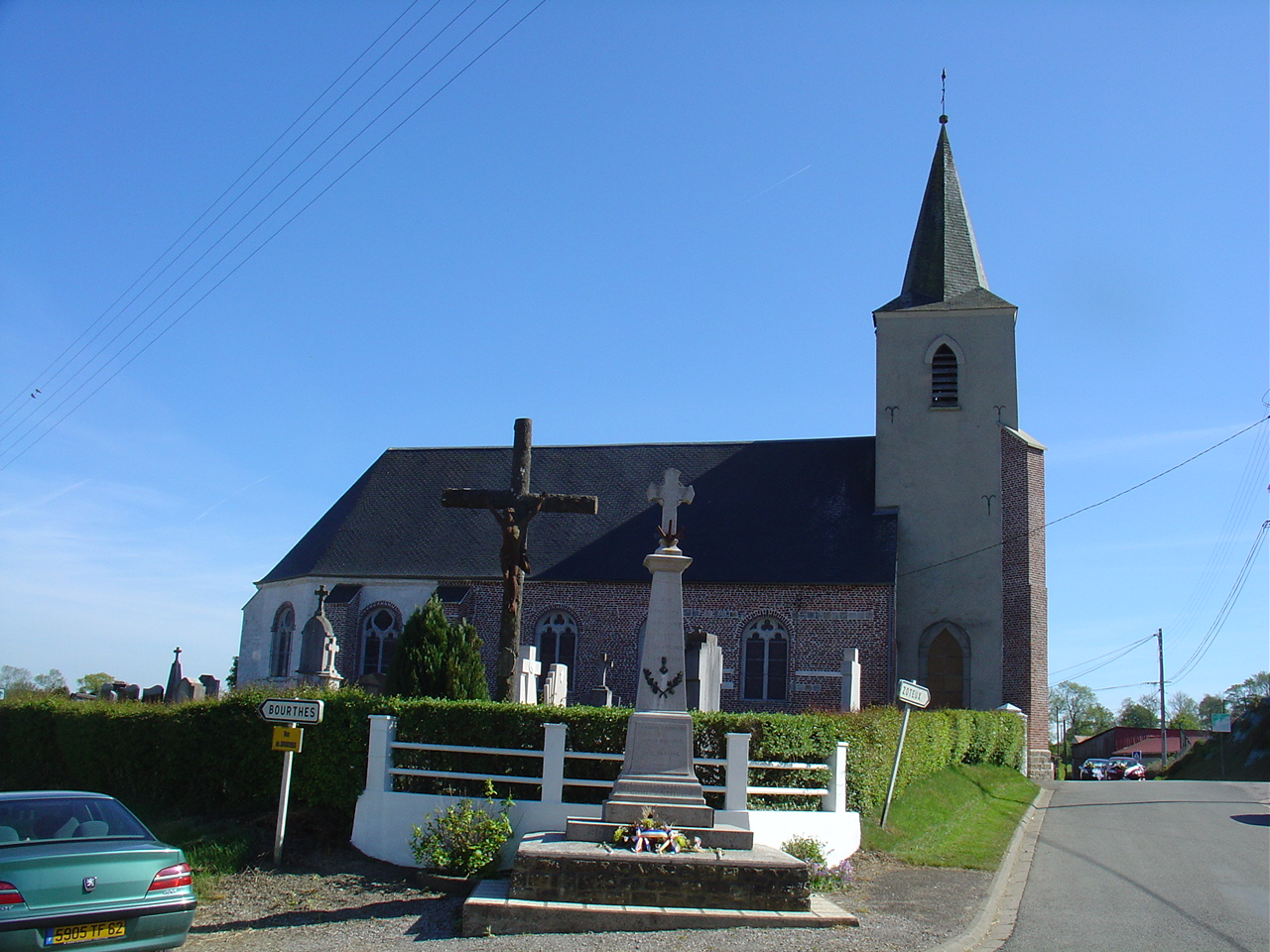
- The church of Bécourt

- Coat of arms
- Location of Bécourt
- Location within France Location within Hauts-de-France
- Coordinates: 50°38′18″N 1°54′40″E
- Country: France
- Region: Hauts-de-France
- Department: Pas-de-Calais
- Arrondissement: Montreuil
- Canton: Lumbres
- Intercommunality: CC Haut Pays du Montreuillois

Government
  - Mayor (2022–2026): Sarah Compiegne
- Area^{1}: 6.03 km^{2} (2.33 sq mi)
- Elevation: 154 m (505 ft)
- Highest elevation: 202 m (663 ft)
- Lowest elevation: 144 m (472 ft)
- Population (2023): 280
  - Density: 46/km^{2} (120/sq mi)
- Time zone: UTC+01:00 (CET)
  - Summer (DST): UTC+02:00 (CEST)
- INSEE/Postal code: 62102 /62240
- ^{1} French Land Register data, which excludes lakes, ponds, glaciers > 1 km^{2} (0.386 sq mi or 247 acres) and river estuaries.

Bécourt (French pronunciation: [bekuʁ]) is a commune in the Pas-de-Calais department in the Hauts-de-France region in northern France.

== Geography ==
A village situated some 13 miles (20 km) southeast of Boulogne-sur-Mer on the D156 road.

== Population ==
Historical population
Year	Pop.	±% p.a.
1968	224	—
1975	222	−0.13%
1982	234	+0.75%
1990	249	+0.78%
1999	238	−0.50%
2007	280	+2.05%
2012	272	−0.58%
2017	272	+0.00%
2023	280	+0.48%
Source: INSEE

== See also ==
- Communes of the Pas-de-Calais department
