= Sheriff of London Charity Shield =

Defunct association football competition

- Founded: 1898
- Abolished: 1907 (fundraising matches held 1931–32, 1934, 1964–66, 1983)
- Region: England; Scotland
- Teams: 2
- Last champions: Watford
- Most championships: Arsenal (4 titles)

The Sheriff of London Charity Shield, also known as the Dewar Shield, was a football competition played annually between the best amateur and best professional club in England, though Scottish amateur side Queen's Park also took part in 1899. The professional side was either the Football League champion or FA Cup winner from the previous season while the amateurs were usually represented by Corinthians, a renowned amateur side of the time. The first game was played on 19 March 1898, after being devised by Sir Thomas Dewar and ratified by the Football Association, whose president Lord Kinnaird and former president Sir Francis Marindin sat on the Shield's committee.

Proceeds from the annual game were distributed to hospitals and charities. The game was the predecessor to the FA Charity Shield, today the FA Community Shield, which began in 1908 after the Amateur Football Association split from the Football Association. After 1908 the trophy was revived on seven occasions in the twentieth century to raise funds for grassroots football causes.

== History ==
=== Formation ===
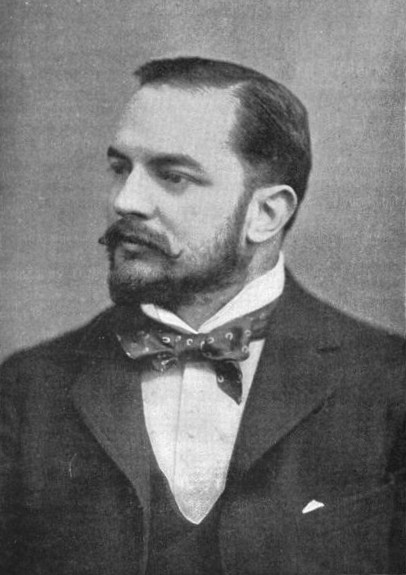
Lord Dewar

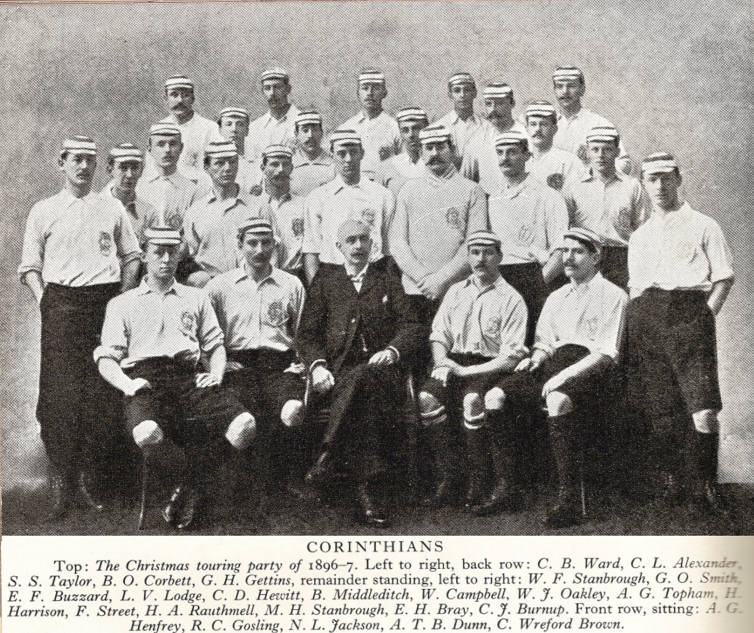
The Corinthians team of 1896–97, including Shield committee members: Charles Wreford Brown (far left, seated), N.L. Jackson (centre, seated) and R.C. Gosling (2nd left, seated)

In 1898 a shield was offered by Sir Thomas Dewar, at that time a Sheriff of London, with the understanding that it would pit the best professional and amateur side against each other with proceeds going to charity. A high profile committee of Football Association and amateur football representatives, politicians and England players past and present was formed composed of Sir Thomas; Lord Kinnaird (President of the FA); Sir Reginald Hanson (Lord Mayor of London); Sir Francis Marindin (Former President of the FA); Sir William Bromley-Davenport (Member of Parliament and former England international footballer); Colonel Harry McCalmont (Member of Parliament), R. Cunliffe Gosling (former England captain), Dr. Kemp (a former player for the London-based United Hospitals side), N. L. Jackson (FA Honorary Secretary and Founder of Corinthians), John Bentley (President of the Football League), and Charles Wreford-Brown (former England captain and FA Council member).

The competition lasted for nine years in its first incarnation, evolving into a showcase pre-season fixture that attracted large crowds to Crystal Palace. In 1907 the FA refused to sanction any further matches following a rift that developed between professional and amateur status clubs and officials; partly fuelled by growing financial disparity between clubs, and perceived corruption of the sport into a commercial enterprise. Ultimately the FA barred their own clubs and players from taking party in any further matches with clubs from the breakaway Amateur Football Association for the 1908 edition, while recognising the ultimate value in a showpiece charitable endeavour. As a result the final edition of the original competition would be the 1907 match won by Newcastle United. The FA supplanted the competition with their own charitable competition, with the first edition of the newly christined FA Charity Shield taking place in August 1908. After initially pitting the Football League winner against the winners of the Southern Football League, the new Charity Shield soon adopted the convention of league winner versus winner of the FA Cup.

=== Legacy ===
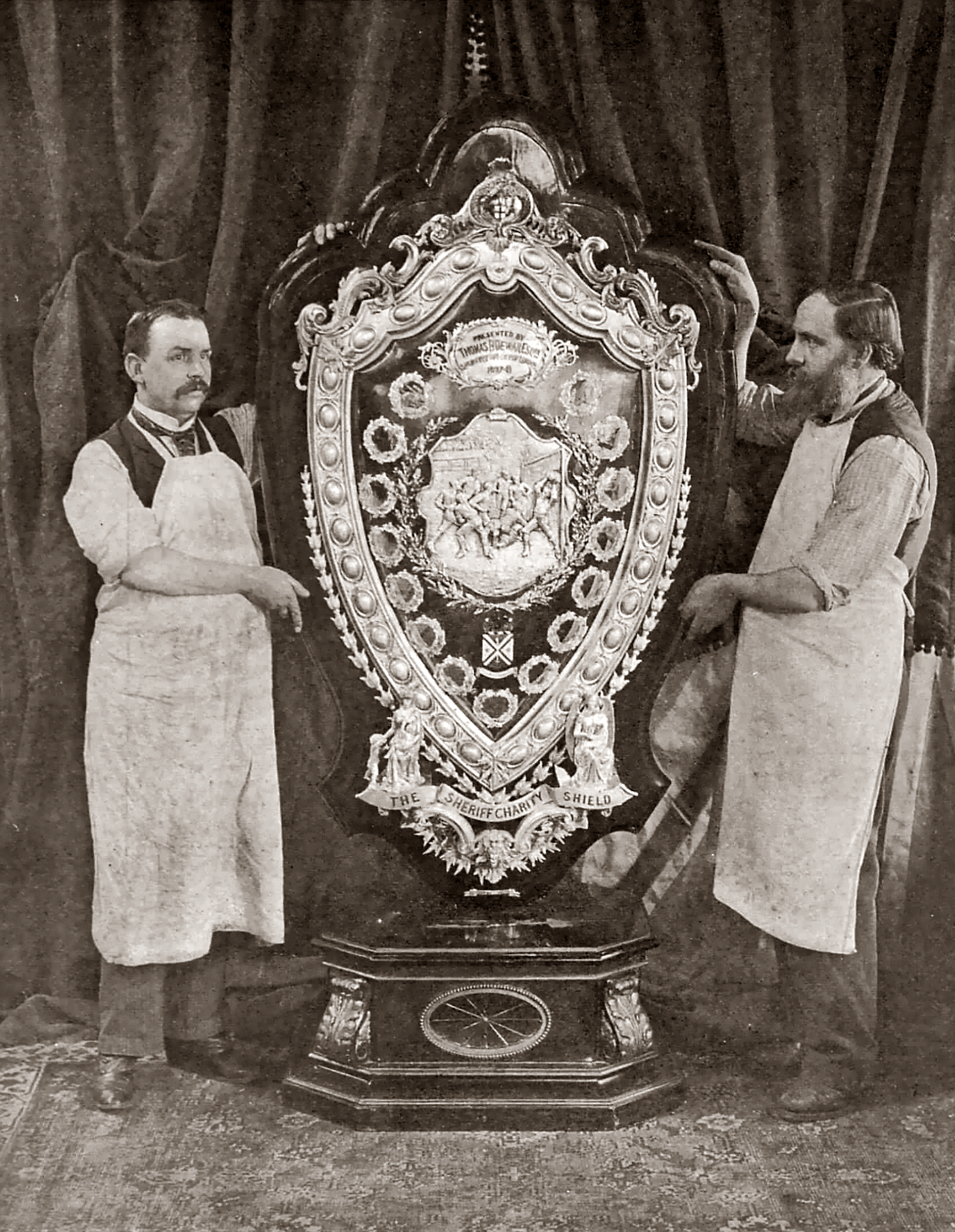
The shield compared to two males, 1898

The match was later resurrected in the 1930s over four years at the suggestion of Charles Wreford-Brown, a member of the original Shield committee, to raise funds for the National Playing Fields Association. The trophy was again competed for in the 1960s for three years with funds supporting Corinthian-Casuals, the successor to the original Corinthians side. The most recent match for the shield trophy was a one-off game played between Watford and Corinthian-Casuals in 1983, marking the centenary of Corinthians' original formation. Watford ran out as 6–1 winners. All seven matches in the post-1907 era were London-only affairs.

The shield itself, commissioned by Dewar, was over six feet high and believed to be the largest trophy to be competed for in the history of football. In 1993, the trophy was put up for auction by Corinthian-Casuals to finance all-weather training facilities; it sold for around £25,000 to a private American owner. Despite requests from the FA for the trophy to be displayed at exhibitions it has not been seen again.

== List of matches ==
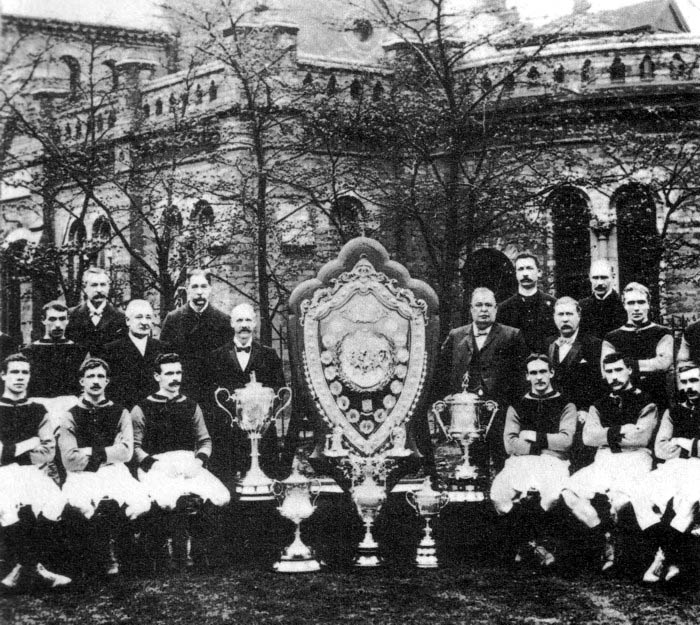
The Aston Villa team of 1899 that won the First Division and the Sheriff of London Charity Shield (centre)

=== Sheriff of London Charity Shield ===
- 1898 Corinthians 0–0 Sheffield United (match replayed and drawn 1–1, shared)
- 1899 Aston Villa 0–0 Queen's Park (shared)
- 1900 Corinthians 2–1 Aston Villa
- 1901 Aston Villa 1–0 Corinthians
- 1902 Tottenham Hotspur 5–2 Corinthians
- 1903 Sunderland 3–0 Corinthians
- 1904 Corinthians 10–3 Bury
- 1905 The Wednesday 2–1 Corinthians
- 1906 Liverpool 5–1 Corinthians
- 1907 Newcastle United 5–2 Corinthians
- 1931 Arsenal 5–3 Corinthians
- 1932 Arsenal 9–2 Corinthians
- 1934 Tottenham Hotspur 7–4 Corinthians
- 1964 Arsenal 7–0 Corinthian-Casuals
- 1965 Arsenal 5–2 Corinthian-Casuals
- 1966 Watford 7–0 Corinthian-Casuals
- 1983 Watford 6–1 Corinthian Casuals

== See also ==
- Gentlemen v Players, amateur v professional cricket match, 1806–1962
