= Premier League Asia Trophy =

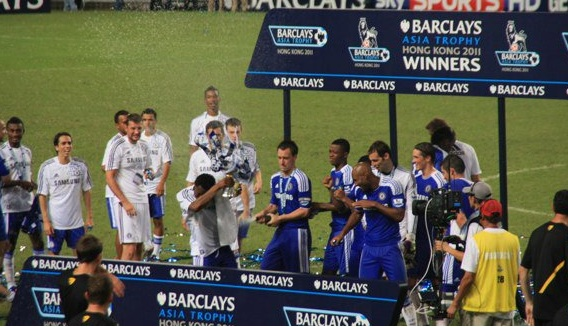
- Chelsea celebrate with the tournament cup after winning the 2011 Premier League Asia Trophy.
- Founded: 2003
- Abolished: 2019
- Region: AFC (Asia)
- Teams: 4
- Last champions: Wolverhampton Wanderers (1st title)
- Most championships: Chelsea (2 titles)

The Premier League Asia Trophy (formerly the FA Premier League Asia Cup) was a biennial pre-season association football friendly tournament in Asia. The two-day competition was inaugurated in 2003 and is one of two Premier League-affiliated competitions to be hosted outside England, alongside the Premier League Summer Series in the US. It has taken place every other summer since then in order to avoid conflicting with the FIFA World Cup and the UEFA European Championship. For sponsorship purposes, it was referred to as the Barclays Asia Trophy from 2007 until 2015, after which the Premier League discontinued title sponsorship.

The competition features three clubs that are members of the Premier League, (Note: The three clubs are selected according to their position in the league table. One of the teams selected achieved the top five, the other team finished in sixth to tenth place, while the final team placed eleventh to fifteenth.) as well as a local team from the host country. It employs a knockout system in which the winners of the first matches advance to the final, while the losing teams take part in a third place playoff. The tournament format was partly modified for the 2017 edition, with no local team participating after the withdrawal of Shanghai SIPG. A fourth Premier League club – Crystal Palace – agreed to take their place having avoided relegation and played alongside Liverpool, Leicester City, and West Bromwich Albion. This marked the first time the tournament featured teams solely from the Premier League.

Chelsea won the inaugural tournament in 2003, and finished victorious again in 2011. Seven other sides have won the Premier League Asia Trophy: Bolton Wanderers in 2005, Portsmouth in 2007, Tottenham Hotspur in 2009, Manchester City in 2013, Arsenal in 2015, Liverpool in 2017, and Wolverhampton Wanderers in 2019. Manchester City is the most regular participant, having contested the tournament on three occasions. Thailand's under-23 national team are the only local Asian side to advance to the final of the contest. Hong Kong has hosted the tournament four times, more than any other city.

== History ==
The FA Premier League Asia Cup, as it was originally known, was first organised in March 2003 by ESPN STAR Sports and formally announced by the league's chairman, Dave Richards. It was established as a result of "the increasing popularity of the Premier League in the continent". Asia and Oceania accounted for the league's largest audience during the 2013–14 season with 339.5 million viewers. Moreover, China (52%), India (49%), and Thailand (47%) had "the largest broadcast penetration" among international markets after Nigeria. With the contest scheduled to take place three weeks before the start of the league season, it is intended to serve as the last warm-up event for participating teams before they embark on competitive football.

The inaugural tournament took place between 24 July and 27 July 2003, with Chelsea, Newcastle, Birmingham City, and Malaysia taking part. The final saw 47,500 people filling the Bukit Jalil National Stadium in Kuala Lumpur. Chelsea won the first tournament, edging Newcastle 5–4 in a penalty shootout that went to sudden death after a goalless draw at full time. Two years later Bolton Wanderers made an appearance alongside Everton, Manchester City, and the Thai under-23 national team, and defeated the local side 1–0 in the final, courtesy of a late penalty by El Hadji Diouf.

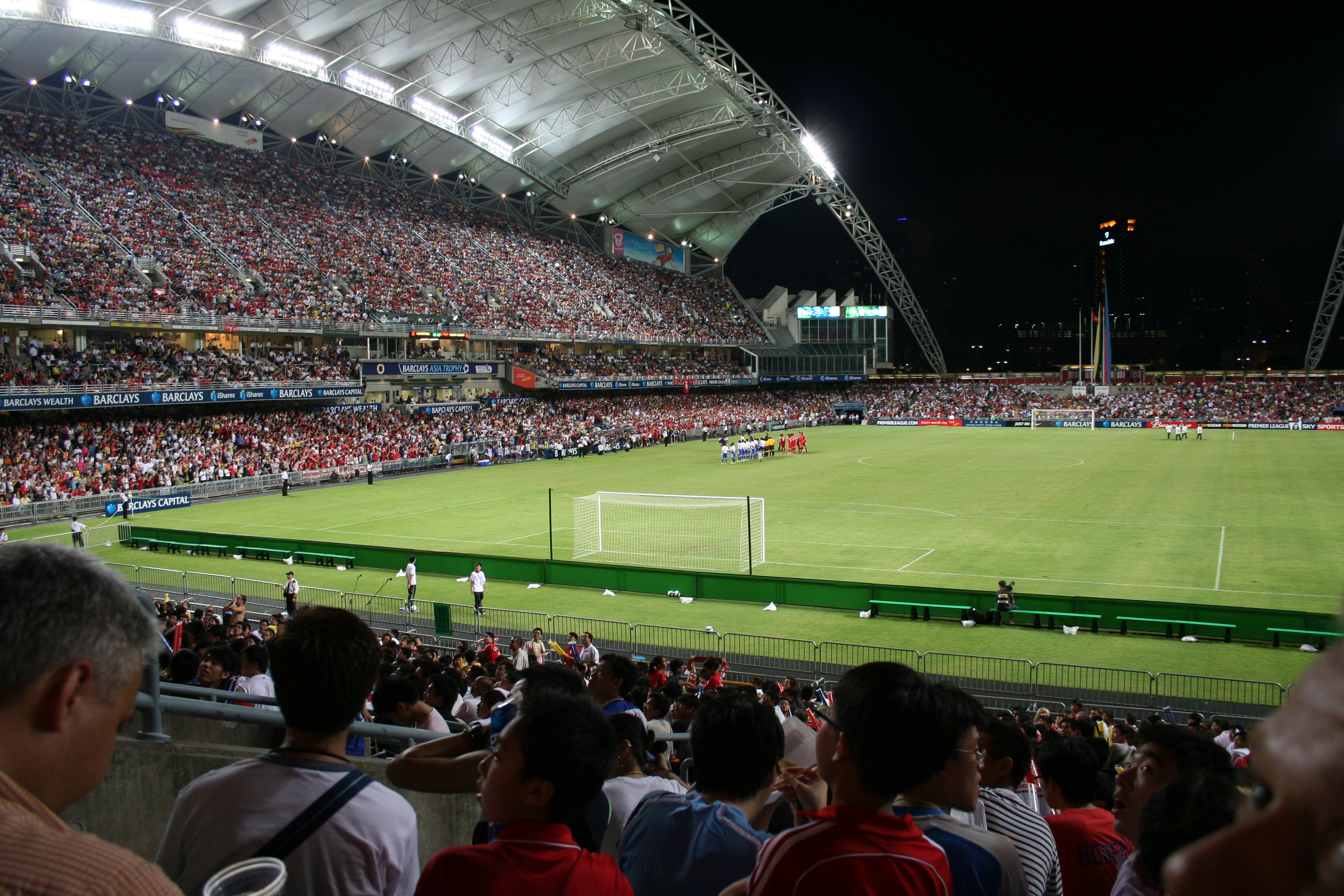
Liverpool facing South China in 2007 at the Hong Kong Stadium, which also hosted the 2011, 2013, and 2017 editions of the tournament.

The 2007 edition was held in Hong Kong, coinciding with the 10th anniversary of the city's transfer of sovereignty from the United Kingdom to China. It was the first event to feature Barclays as the title sponsor. The title match was an upset in which Portsmouth held Liverpool to a goalless draw, before their goalkeeper David James saved two spot kicks in the ensuing penalty shootout that ended 4–2 in Portsmouth's favour. Despite the fact that the Premier League Asia Trophy was sold out for the first time in its history, the right to host the 2009 competition was awarded to Beijing. The attendance for that contest, however, was underwhelming, with only 10,000 people present for the final at the 66,000-capacity Workers' Stadium, where Tottenham Hotspur beat Hull City 3–0 thanks to a brace from Robbie Keane.

The next two tournaments saw the Premier League Asia Trophy return to Hong Kong. In 2011, Chelsea participated in the competition a second time, and regained the trophy by triumphing 2–0 against Aston Villa before a capacity crowd at the Hong Kong Stadium. Manchester City won the 2013 event, which was overshadowed by heavy rain causing the semifinal matches to be abbreviated to 80 minutes and leading to the degradation of the stadium's playing surface. The quality of the pitch was universally lambasted, especially after several players were consequently injured while playing on it.

The 2015 edition was hosted by Singapore to honour the city-state's 50th anniversary of independence from Malaysia. Arsenal claimed their first Premier League Asia Trophy, routing the host country's Select XI side 4–0 behind a Chuba Akpom hat-trick, before defeating Everton 3–1 in the final. The event saw tournament attendance records broken for most people at a single match day (52,107) and the largest cumulative attendance across the two days (just short of 82,000).

The 2017 event featured Liverpool, Leicester City, West Bromwich Albion, and Crystal Palace. Due to the success of the Asia Trophy, the Premier League has considered establishing similar competitions in other continents to broaden their global presence. Richard Scudamore, the league's executive chairman, envisions Africa and the United States to be likely locations for such tournaments.

== Tournaments ==
Key
Team (X)	Name of the team and number of times they had finished in the position at that point (if more than one)
‡	Denotes the local team from the host country

Premier League Asia Trophy tournaments
Edition	Year	Winner	Runner-up	Third	Fourth	Venue	Ref(s)
1	2003	Chelsea	Newcastle United	Birmingham City	Malaysia^{‡}	Bukit Jalil National Stadium (Kuala Lumpur, Malaysia)	
2	2005	Bolton Wanderers	Thailand U23^{‡}	Manchester City	Everton	Rajamangala Stadium (Bangkok, Thailand)	
3	2007	Portsmouth	Liverpool	Fulham	South China^{‡}	Hong Kong Stadium (Hong Kong)	
4	2009	Tottenham Hotspur	Hull City	West Ham United	Beijing Guoan^{‡}	Workers' Stadium (Beijing, China)	
5	2011	Chelsea (2)	Aston Villa	Blackburn Rovers	Kitchee^{‡}	Hong Kong Stadium (Hong Kong)	
6	2013	Manchester City	Sunderland	Tottenham Hotspur	South China^{‡} (2)	Hong Kong Stadium (Hong Kong)	
7	2015	Arsenal	Everton	Stoke City	Singapore Select XI^{‡}	National Stadium (Singapore)	
8	2017	Liverpool	Leicester City	Crystal Palace	West Bromwich Albion	Hong Kong Stadium (Hong Kong)	
9	2019	Wolverhampton Wanderers	Manchester City	Newcastle United	West Ham United	Hongkou Football Stadium (Shanghai, China); Nanjing Olympic Sports Centre (Nanjing, China)	

== Performance by team ==
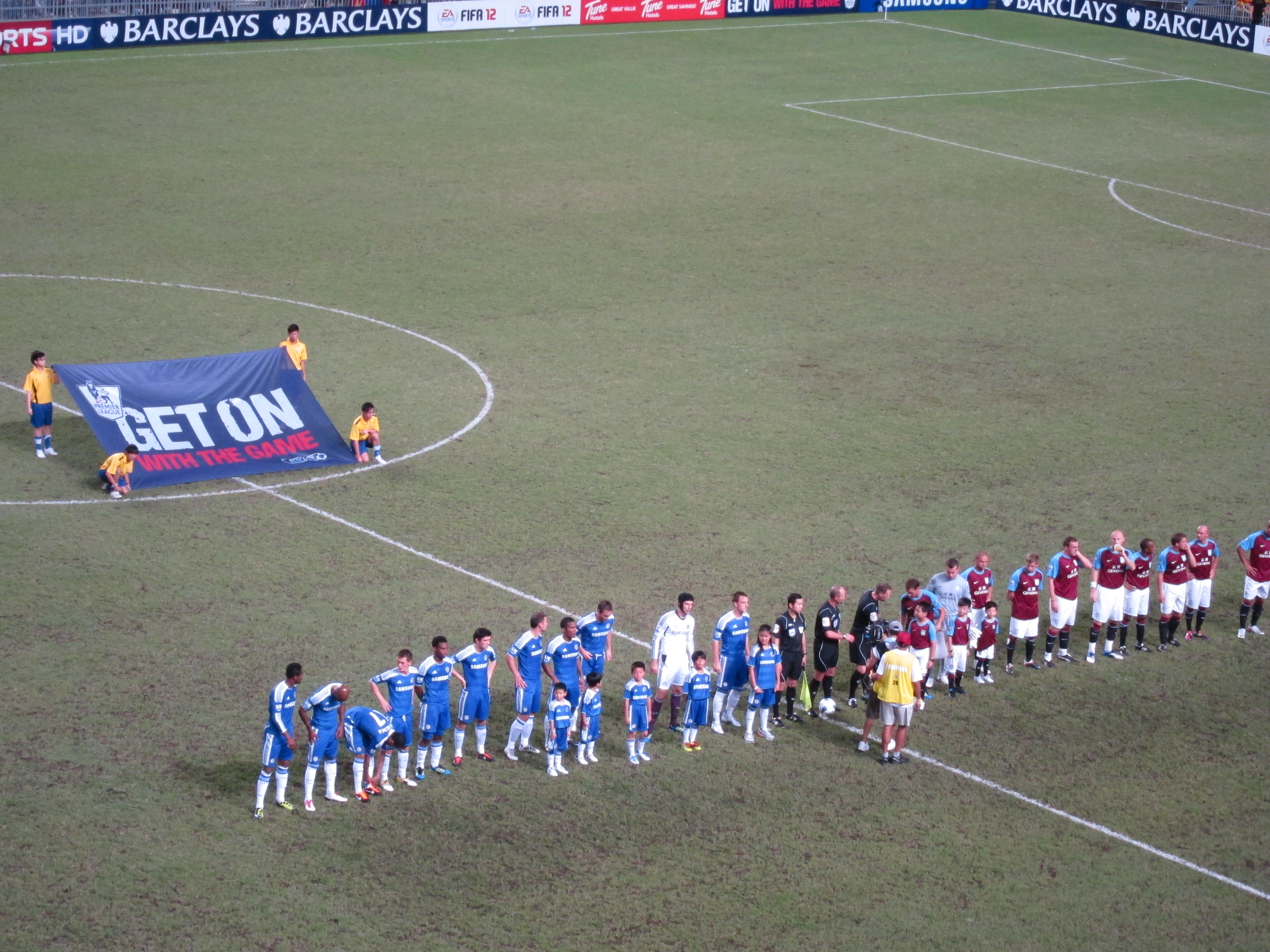
Aston Villa and Chelsea contested the 2011 final, with the latter prevailing 2–0.

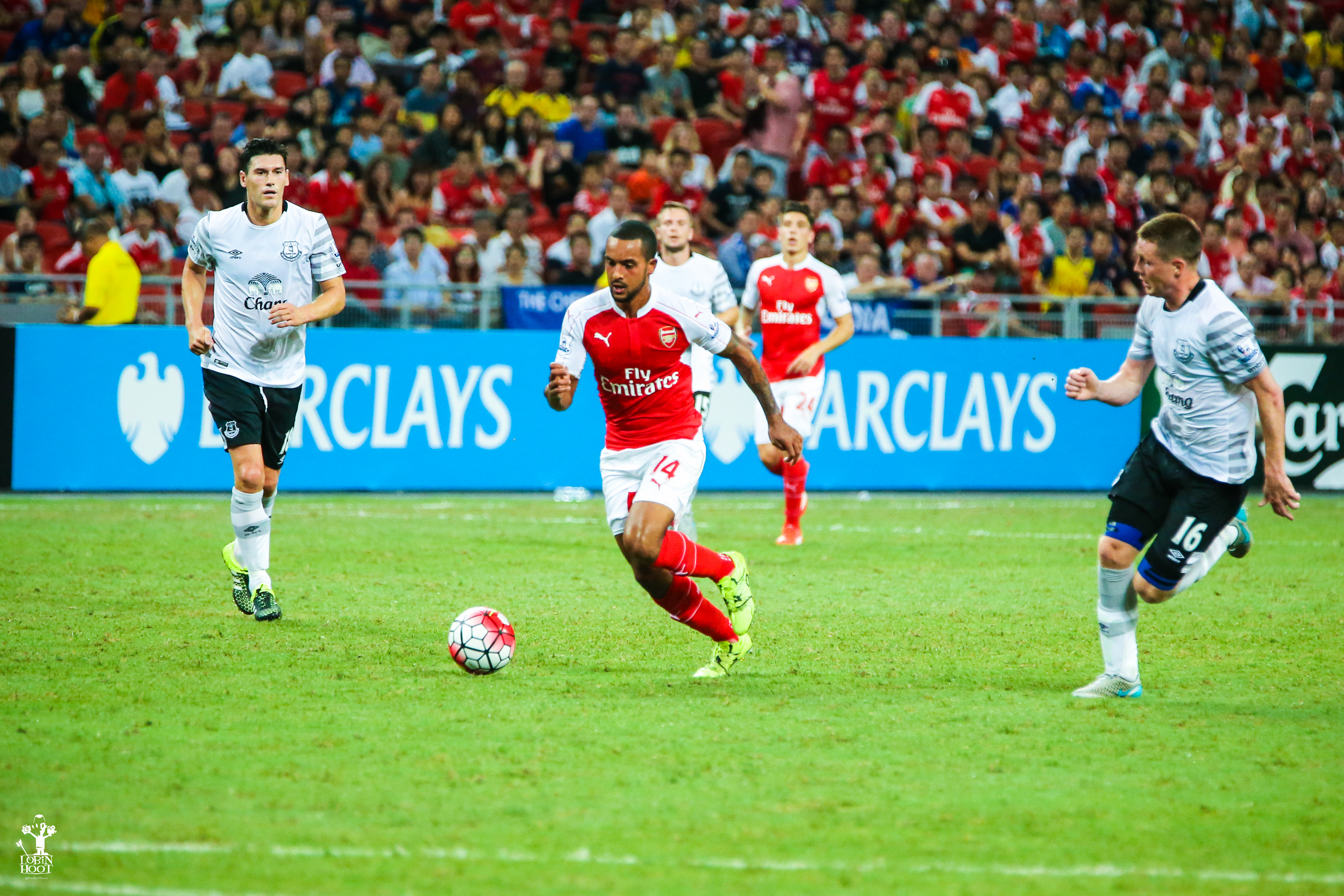
Gareth Barry (left) and James McCarthy (right) featured in the 2015 edition of the Premier League Asia Trophy for Everton, while Theo Walcott (centre) did so for Arsenal.

Premier League Asia Trophy performances by team
Team	Winner	Runner-up	Third	Fourth	Total
Chelsea	2	—	—	—	2
Manchester City	1	1	1	—	3
Liverpool	1	1	—	—	2
Tottenham Hotspur	1	—	1	—	2
Bolton Wanderers	1	—	—	—	1
Portsmouth	1	—	—	—	1
Arsenal	1	—	—	—	1
Wolverhampton Wanderers	1	—	—	—	1
Newcastle United	—	1	1	—	2
Everton	—	1	—	1	2
Thailand U23	—	1	—	—	1
Hull City	—	1	—	—	1
Aston Villa	—	1	—	—	1
Sunderland	—	1	—	—	1
Leicester City	—	1	—	—	1
West Ham United	—	—	1	1	2
Birmingham City	—	—	1	—	1
Fulham	—	—	1	—	1
Blackburn Rovers	—	—	1	—	1
Stoke City	—	—	1	—	1
Crystal Palace	—	—	1	—	1
South China	—	—	—	2	2
Malaysia	—	—	—	1	1
Beijing Guoan	—	—	—	1	1
Kitchee	—	—	—	1	1
Singapore Select XI	—	—	—	1	1
West Bromwich Albion	—	—	—	1	1

== See also ==
- Premier League Summer Series
