= 2007 Premier League Asia Trophy =

Tournament details
- City: Hong Kong
- Teams: 4 (from 2 confederations)
- Venue: 1 (in 1 host city)

Final positions
- Champions: (England) Portsmouth (1st title)
- Runners-up: (England) Liverpool
- Third place: (England) Fulham
- Fourth place: (Hong Kong) South China

Tournament statistics
- Matches played: 4
- Goals scored: 10 (2.5 per match)
- Top scorer(s): Ten players (1 goal each)
- Best player: (England) David James

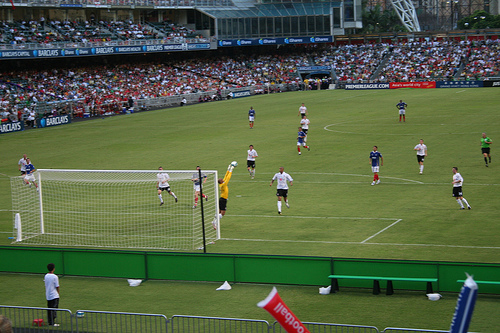
Barclays Asia Trophy 2007 at Hong Kong Stadium.

The 2007 Premier League Asia Trophy (Traditional chinese: 巴克萊亞洲錦標賽) was the third edition of the Premier League Asia Trophy, a four-team association football tournament held every two years. The tournament was held in Hong Kong. The 2007 edition was competed by South China AA, the winner of Hong Kong's FA Cup, Liverpool, Portsmouth and Fulham at the 40,000-capacity Hong Kong Stadium. The semi-finals took place on 24 July and the final and third-place play-off were on 27 July 2007.

Portsmouth won the first semi-final 1–0 against Fulham after a goal by Benjani in the 45th minute. Liverpool beat South China in the second semi-final thanks to a John Arne Riise free-kick and a Xabi Alonso penalty. South China pulled a goal back with a Li Haiqiang free-kick, but Daniel Agger scored to make it 3–1. Fulham beat South China 4–1 in the third place play-off, while Portsmouth beat Liverpool 4–2 on penalties to win the Premier League Asia Trophy after a goalless draw in normal time.

== Competition format ==
The competition used a knock-out format. South China played Liverpool, while Fulham played Portsmouth, both matches taking place on 24 July. The winners competed in the final on 27 July, while the losers played in the third place play-off on the same day.

== Prizes ==
Hong Kong FA Cup winner South China received HK$500,000 from the organizers as appearance fee in the tournament. The winner of the tournament received a trophy as well as £100,000 prize money.

== Official match programme ==
An A5 sized, 60-page bilingual (English/Chinese) official match programme was published for sale during the match days within the stadium. It retailed at HK$20 (~£1.30).

== Results ==
Semi-finals
24 July 2007 – Hong Kong (Hong Kong Stadium)
(Hong Kong) South China	1
(England) Liverpool	3
24 July 2007 - Hong Kong (Hong Kong Stadium)
(England) Portsmouth	1
(England) Fulham	0

Final
27 July 2007 – Hong Kong (Hong Kong Stadium)
(England) Portsmouth	0 (4)
(England) Liverpool	0 (2)
Third place
27 July 2007 – Hong Kong (Hong Kong Stadium)
(England) Fulham	4
(Hong Kong) South China	1

=== Semi-finals ===
2007-07-24
18:00 HKT
10:00 UTC

Fulham (England)	0 – 1	(England) Portsmouth
	Report	Benjani 45'

Hong Kong Stadium, Hong Kong
Attendance: 36,801
Referee: Chris Foy

2007-07-24
20:30 HKT
12:30 UTC

South China AA (Hong Kong)	1 – 3	(England) Liverpool
Li Haiqiang 35'	(Report)	Riise 10'; Alonso 28' (pen.); Agger 74'

Hong Kong Stadium, Hong Kong
Attendance: 36,801
Referee: Mark Clattenburg

=== Third place play-off ===
2007-07-27
18:00 HKT
10:00 UTC

South China AA (Hong Kong)	1 – 4	(England) Fulham
Barros 57'	Report	Bouba Diop 20'; Bocanegra 47'; Healy 74'; McBride 84'

Hong Kong Stadium, Hong Kong
Attendance: 39,535

=== Final ===
2007-07-27
20:30 HKT
12:30 UTC

Liverpool (England)	0 – 0	(England) Portsmouth
	(Report)
Penalties
Gerrard (penalty scored); Kuyt (penalty scored); Benayoun (penalty missed); Torres (penalty missed)	2 – 4	(penalty missed) Utaka; (penalty scored) Taylor; (penalty scored) LuaLua; (penalty scored) Hreiðarsson; (penalty scored) Kranjčar

Hong Kong Stadium, Hong Kong
Attendance: 39,535

== Goalscorers ==
The goal scorers from the Premier League Asia Trophy 2007 are as follows:

#	Name	Team	Goals
1	(Denmark) Daniel Agger	(England) Liverpool	1
1	(Spain) Xabi Alonso	(England) Liverpool	1
1	(China) Li Haiqiang	(Hong Kong) South China	1
1	(Norway) John Arne Riise	(England) Liverpool	1
1	(Zimbabwe) Benjani Mwaruwari	(England) Portsmouth	1
1	(Senegal) Papa Bouba Diop	(England) Fulham	1
1	(United States) Carlos Bocanegra	(England) Fulham	1
1	(Brazil) Flavio Barros	(Hong Kong) South China	1
1	(Northern Ireland) David Healy	(England) Fulham	1
1	(United States) Brian McBride	(England) Fulham	1

== Player of the Tournament ==
The Player of the Tournament award was awarded to David James of Portsmouth. James kept 2 clean sheets, and saved penalties from Yossi Benayoun and Fernando Torres.

== Gallery ==
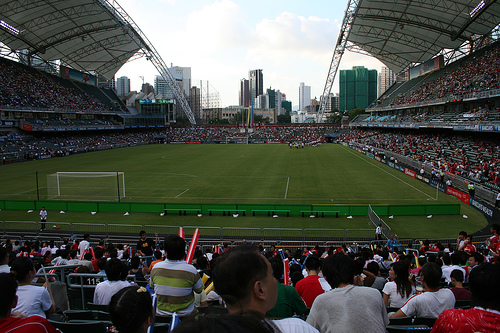

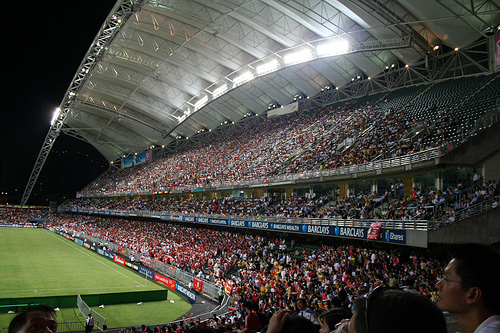

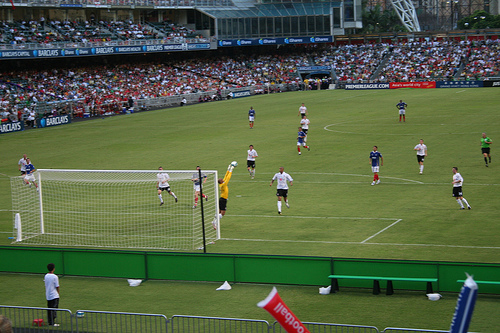

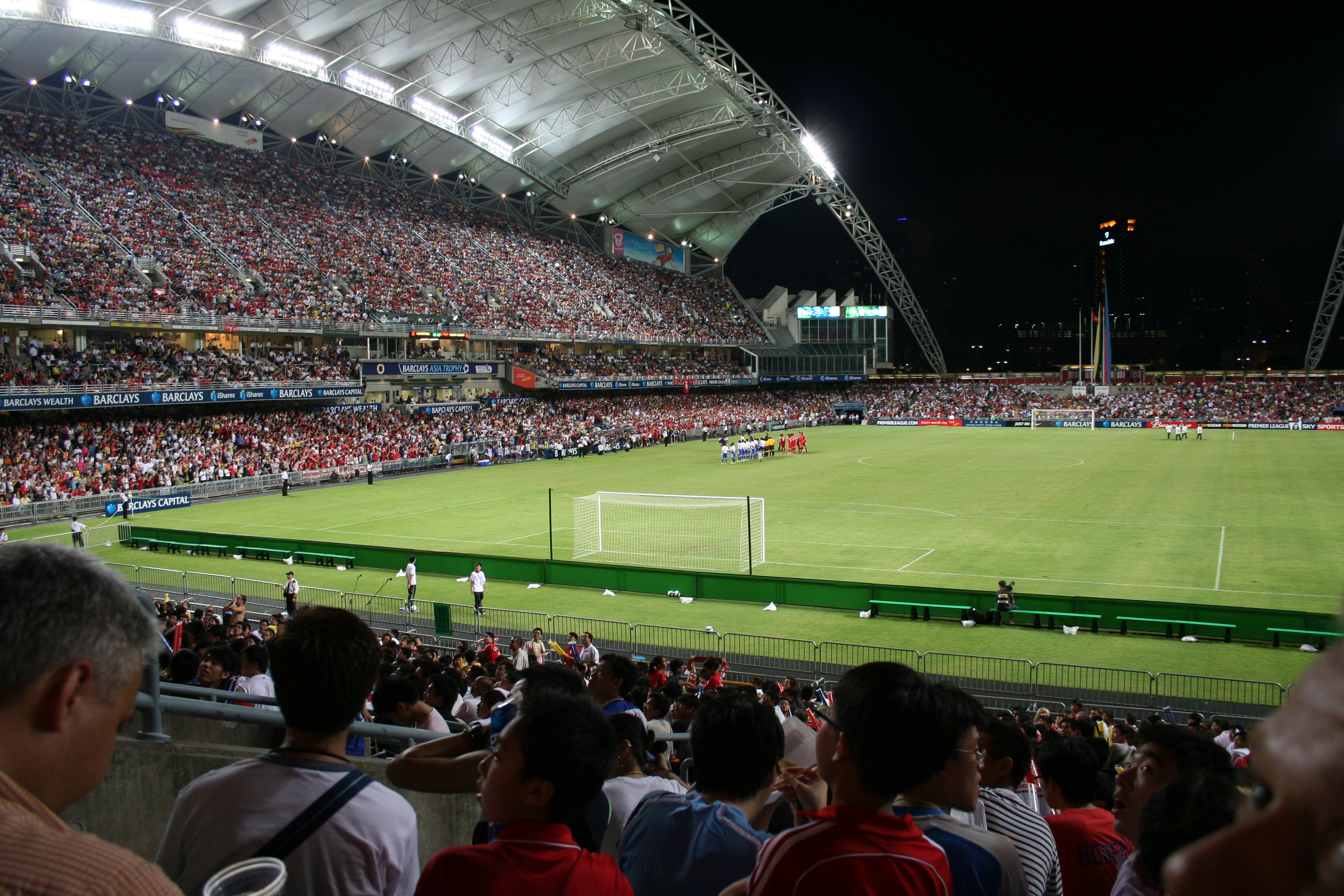

== See also ==
- Hong Kong FA Cup 2006-07
