= 2005 FA Premier League Asia Trophy =

2005 FA Premier League Asia Cup
Tournament details
- Host country: Thailand
- Teams: 4 (from 2 confederations)
- Venue: 1 (in 1 host city)

Final positions
- Champions: (England) Bolton Wanderers (1st title)
- Runners-up: Thailand U23
- Third place: (England) Manchester City
- Fourth place: (England) Everton

Tournament statistics
- Matches played: 4
- Goals scored: 7 (1.75 per match)
- Top scorer(s): Seven players (1 goal each)

The FA Premier League Asia Cup 2005 was the second edition of the Premier League Asia Trophy, a four-team football (soccer) tournament held every two years. The second edition was competed by Thailand U23, Bolton Wanderers, Everton and Manchester City at the 49,749-capacity Rajamangala Stadium in Bangkok, Thailand. The semi-finals took place on 20 July and both third-place play-off and final on 26 July 2005.

Both semifinals were decided on spot kicks with the scores levelled on 1–1 at full-time. Thailand U23 defeated Everton 5–3 while Bolton Wanderers edged Manchester City 5–4 on the spot-kicks.

The third place play-off was also decided via spot-kicks after a 1–1 stalemate. Manchester City beat Everton 4–2 on spot-kicks. The final was won through a penalty converted by Diouf on the 79th minute as Bolton Wanderers clinched the title with a slim 1–0 win over Thailand.

== Competition format ==
The competition used a knock-out format. On 20 July 2005, Thailand played Everton while Bolton played Man. City. The winners competed in the final while the losers competed for 3rd place play-off, both on 23 July 2005.

== Results ==
Semi-finals
20 July 2005 – Thailand (Rajamangala Stadium)
Thailand U23	1 (5)
(England) Everton	1 (3)
20 July 2005 - Thailand U23 (Rajamangala Stadium)
(England) Bolton Wanderers	1 (5)
(England) Manchester City	1 (4)

Final
27 July 2005 – Thailand (Rajamangala Stadium)
Thailand U23	0
(England) Bolton Wanderers	1
Third place
26 July 2005 – Thailand (Rajamangala Stadium)
(England) Manchester City	1 (4)
(England) Everton	1 (2)

=== Semi-finals ===
2005-07-20
19:00 MST
08:00 UTC

Thailand U23	1 – 1	(England) Everton
Pichitphong 9'		Bent 44'
Penalties
Datsakorn (penalty scored); Teeratep (penalty scored); Pichitphong (penalty scored); Chakrit (penalty scored); Jakkrit (penalty scored)	5 – 3	(penalty scored) Weir; (penalty scored) McFadden; (penalty missed) Yobo; (penalty scored) Kilbane

Rajamangala Stadium, Thailand
Attendance: 45,000
Referee: Mark Clattenburg

2005-07-20
21:45 MST
08:00 UTC

Bolton Wanderers (England)	1 – 1	(England) Manchester City
Davies 47'		Barton 41'
Penalties
Okocha (penalty scored); Diouf (penalty scored); Vaz Tê (penalty scored); Fadiga (penalty scored); Campo (penalty scored)	5 – 4	(penalty scored) Barton; (penalty scored) Flood; (penalty scored) Sun Jihai; (penalty scored) Bermingham; (penalty missed) Wright-Phillips

Rajamangala Stadium, Thailand
Attendance: 10,000
Referee: Chris Foy

=== Third place play-off ===
2005-07-26
17:45 MST
08:00 UTC

Manchester City (England)	1 – 1	(England) Everton
Cole 24'		Beattie 51' (pen.)
Penalties
Wright-Phillips (penalty scored); Mills (penalty scored); Thatcher (penalty scored); Flood (penalty scored)	4 – 2	(penalty missed) Weir; (penalty scored) Ferguson; (penalty missed) Bent; (penalty scored) Kilbane

Rajamangala Stadium, Thailand
Attendance: 8,000
Referee: Mark Clattenburg

=== Final ===
2005-07-23
21:00 MST
08:00 UTC

Thailand U23	0 – 1	(England) Bolton Wanderers
	Report	Diouf 79' (pen.)

Rajamangala Stadium, Thailand
Attendance: 49,700
Referee: Chris Foy

== Goalscorers ==
1 goal

- (Thailand) Pichitphong Choeichiu
- (England) Marcus Bent
- (England) Joey Barton
- (England) Kevin Davies
- (England) Andrew Cole
- (England) James Beattie
- (Senegal) El Hadji Diouf
