= 2013 Premier League Asia Trophy =

Tournament details
- City: Hong Kong
- Dates: 24 July – 27 July
- Teams: 4 (from 2 confederations)
- Venue: 1 (in 1 host city)

Final positions
- Champions: (England) Manchester City (1st title)
- Runners-up: (England) Sunderland
- Third place: (England) Tottenham Hotspur
- Fourth place: (Hong Kong) South China

Tournament statistics
- Matches played: 4
- Goals scored: 12 (3 per match)
- Top scorer: (England) Jermain Defoe (3 goals)
- Best player: (Bosnia and Herzegovina) Edin Džeko

The 2013 Premier League Asia Trophy was the sixth edition of the Premier League Asia Trophy. Sunderland, Manchester City, Tottenham Hotspur and Hong Kong club South China competed for the title on 24 July 2013 and 27 July 2013 at Hong Kong Stadium in So Kon Po, Hong Kong. Manchester City were the winners, beating Sunderland 1–0 in the final.

The tournament was also notable for the absence of Tottenham Hotspur's star Gareth Bale. Bale travelled with Spurs to Hong Kong, but an injury he suffered in training meant he did not play in either of Tottenham's matches.

Furthermore, the tournament was also notable for the very poor quality of the grass on the pitch at the venue.

== Participating teams ==
Team	Appearances	Best result
(England) Manchester City	2nd	Winner (2013)
(Hong Kong) South China	2nd	4th (2007, 2013)
(England) Sunderland	1st	2nd (2013)
(England) Tottenham Hotspur	2nd	Winner (2009)

== Results ==
Semi-finals
24 July – Hong Kong
(England) Manchester City	1
(Hong Kong) South China	0
24 July – Hong Kong
(England) Tottenham Hotspur	1
(England) Sunderland	3

Final
27 July – Hong Kong
(England) Manchester City	1
(England) Sunderland	0
Third place
27 July – Hong Kong
(England) Tottenham Hotspur	6
(Hong Kong) South China	0

=== Semifinals ===
All kick-off times are local (UTC+08:00).

24 July 2013
18:30

Tottenham Hotspur (England)	1–3	(England) Sunderland
Sigurðsson 28'	Report	Cabral 33'; Brown 64'; Karlsson 80'

Hong Kong Stadium, So Kon Po
Attendance: 35,950
Referee: Liu Kwok Man (Hong Kong)

Delayed by 30 minutes due to rain. Game reduced to 80 minutes (40-minute halves).

24 July 2013
20:40

Manchester City (England)	1–0	(Hong Kong) South China
Džeko 21'	Report

Hong Kong Stadium, So Kon Po
Attendance: 35,950
Referee: Anthony Taylor (England)

Delayed by 10 minutes due to rain. Game reduced to 80 minutes (40-minute halves).

=== Third-place playoff ===
27 July 2013
18:00

Tottenham Hotspur (England)	6–0	(Hong Kong) South China
Sean 12' (o.g.); Dempsey 34'; Defoe 45', 54', 80'; Townsend 86'	Report

Hong Kong Stadium, So Kon Po
Attendance: 39,544
Referee: Neil Swarbrick (England)

=== Final ===
27 July 2013
20:30

Manchester City (England)	1–0	(England) Sunderland
Džeko 9'	Report

Hong Kong Stadium, So Kon Po
Attendance: 39,544
Referee: Anthony Taylor (England)

Manchester City	Sunderland

== Goalscorers ==
3 goals

- (England) Jermain Defoe

2 goals

- (Bosnia and Herzegovina) Edin Džeko

1 goal

- (Cape Verde) Cabral
- (England) Wes Brown
- (England) Andros Townsend
- (Iceland) Gylfi Sigurðsson
- (Sweden) David Moberg Karlsson
- (United States) Clint Dempsey

1 own goal

- (Hong Kong) Sean Tse (playing against Tottenham Hotspur)
