= Hong Kong Stadium =

Main sports venue of Hong Kong

香港大球場 Hong Kong Stadium
- Po Tau (埔頭)
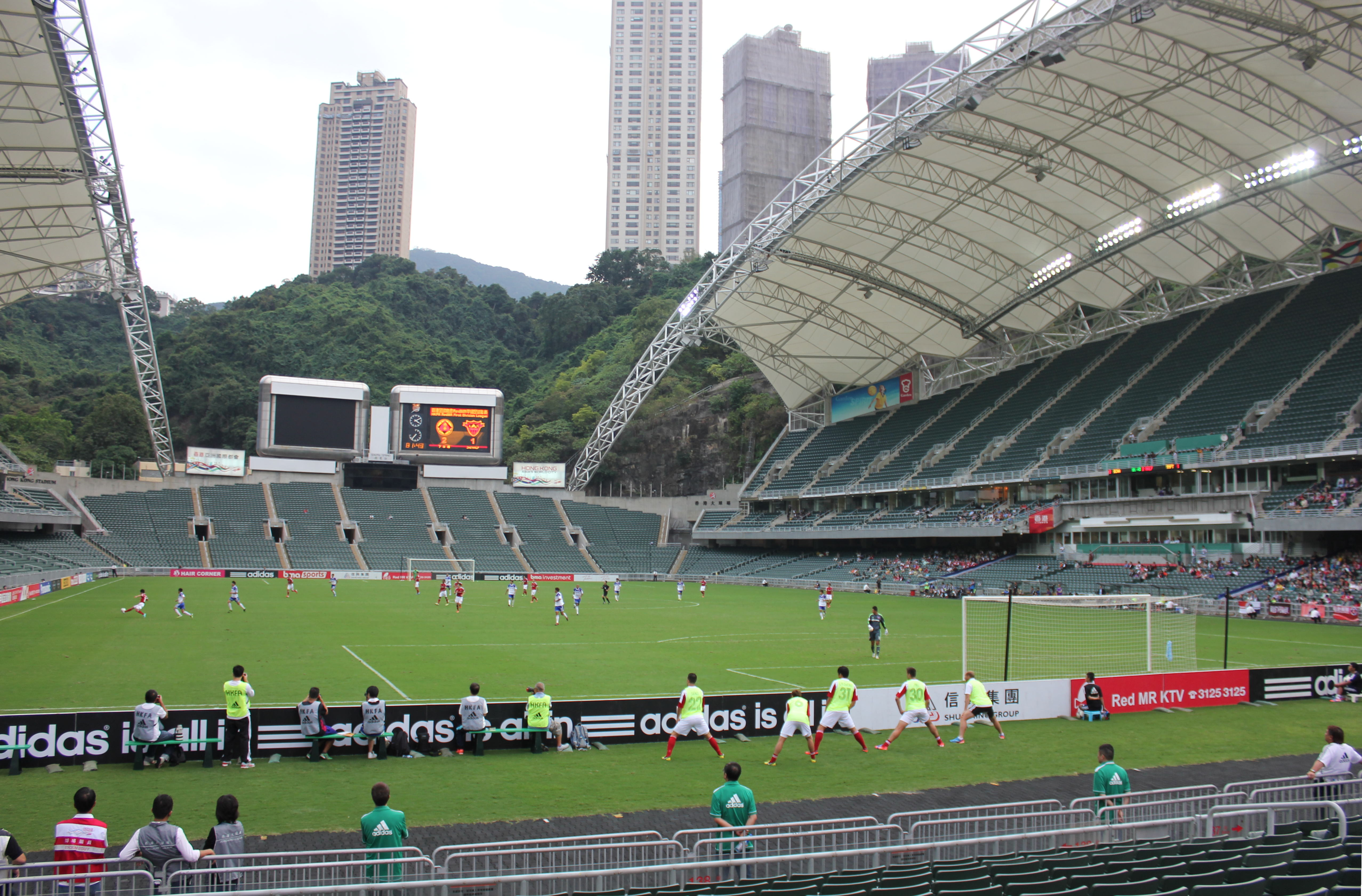
- Hong Kong Stadium as seen from the North Stand in November 2012
- Interactive map of 香港大球場; Hong Kong Stadium
- Former names: Government Stadium
- Location: 55 Eastern Hospital Road, Causeway Bay, Hong Kong
- Coordinates: 22°16′25.9″N 114°11′19.4″E
- Owner: Leisure and Cultural Services Department
- Operator: Leisure and Cultural Services Department
- Capacity: 40,116
- Surface: Grass
- Field size: 105 by 68 metres (344 ft × 223 ft)
- Public transit: Causeway Bay station Exit A and F1

Construction
- Opened: 1953; 73 years ago
- Renovated: 1994; 32 years ago
- Cost: US$85 million
- Architect: HOK Sport

Tenants
- Hong Kong national football team Eastern (2018–2019)

Website
- lcsd.gov.hk/hks

Hong Kong Stadium
- Traditional Chinese: 香港大球場
- Simplified Chinese: 香港大球场
Transcriptions
Standard Mandarin
- Hanyu Pinyin: Xiānggǎng Dàqiúcháng
- Wade–Giles: Hsiangkang Tach'iuch'ang
- Yale Romanization: Syānggǎng Dàchyóucháng
- IPA: [ɕjáŋkàŋ tâtɕʰjǒʊʈʂʰǎŋ]
Yue: Cantonese
- Yale Romanization: Hēunggóng Daaihkàuhchèuhng
- Jyutping: Hoeng1gong2 Daai6kau4coeng4
- IPA: [hœ́ːŋkɔ̌ːŋ tàːikʰɐ̏utsʰœ̏ːŋ]

Hong Kong Government Stadium
- Traditional Chinese: 香港政府大球場
- Simplified Chinese: 香港政府大球场
Transcriptions
Standard Mandarin
- Hanyu Pinyin: Xiānggǎng Zhèngfǔ Dàqiúcháng
- Wade–Giles: Hsiangkang Chengfu Tach'iuch'ang
- Yale Romanization: Syānggǎng Jèngfǔ Dàchyóucháng
Yue: Cantonese
- Yale Romanization: Hēunggóng Jingfú Daaihkàuhchèuhng
- Jyutping: Hoeng1gong2 Zing3fu2 Daai6kau4coeng4
- IPA: [hœ́ːŋkɔ̌ːŋ tɕɪ̄ŋfûː tàːikʰɐ̏utsʰœ̏ːŋ]

nickname
- Traditional Chinese: 埔頭
- Simplified Chinese: 埔头
- Literal meaning: Head of the port
Transcriptions
Standard Mandarin
- Hanyu Pinyin: Pǔ Tóu
- Wade–Giles: P'u T'ou
- Yale Romanization: Pǔ Tóu
Yue: Cantonese
- Yale Romanization: Boutàuh
- Jyutping: Bou3tau4
- IPA: [pōu tʰɐ̏u]

Hong Kong Stadium is the main sports venue of Hong Kong. Redeveloped from the original Government Stadium, it reopened as Hong Kong Stadium in March 1994. It has a maximum seating capacity of 40,000, including 18,260 at the main level, 3,173 at executive level, 18,510 upper-level seats and 57 seats for wheelchair users.

The stadium is located in Causeway Bay, Hong Kong Island, in valley of Caroline Hill. It hosted the inaugural AFC Asian Cup finals and the AFC Women's Asian Cup for four times. Most international football matches held in Hong Kong are held at this stadium. Between 1982 and 2024, it hosted the Hong Kong Sevens annually. Hong Kong Stadium has also hosted the Rugby World Cup Sevens twice, in 1997 and 2005. The stadium is home to the Hong Kong national football team and hosts international matches for Hong Kong Premier League club side Kitchee SC.

== History ==
So Kon Po was formerly the burial ground for the 1918 Fire at Happy Valley Racecourse. Then the Hong Kong Government moved all the tombs to Aberdeen. The old Government Stadium was a U-shaped constructed by 1953 and had a capacity of 28,000 with partially covered seating.

The old Government Stadium was only partially covered, without sufficient seats or lighting systems. In the 90s, the Royal Hong Kong Jockey Club proposed a reconstruction plan so that Hong Kong can have a world class sports stadium.

=== 1994 Re-construction and Wembley International ===
In the early 1990s, the Government Stadium was reconstructed into a 40,000-seat rectangular stadium. No running track was built due to the restricted land size. This forced the schools to look for alternative venues.

The stadium's management contract was won by Wembley International, a foreign subsidiary of Wembley Stadium, against strong competition, in March 1994.

From the first day there have been serious problems with the pitch. The owners of the stadium, the Urban Council, were disappointed. It came under fire from local football officials, sports promoters and even Manchester United manager Alex Ferguson, who said, before the exhibition match between Manchester United and South China AA on 20 July 1997, "The pitch is cutting up. The surface is just sand-based and the turf doesn't hold well. Injuries can occur."

The government had hoped that the stadium could be used as a music concert venue in order to bring in more rental income. But nearby citizens complained endlessly about 'noise levels', leading to restrictions on noise levels that effectively rendered the stadium unsuitable for concerts. This reduced greatly the income levels of the stadium and the management company, Wembley, ran into financial troubles.

=== 1998 Hong Kong government takeover ===
Wembley's management tenure at the stadium was abruptly terminated by the Provisional Urban Council (PUC) on 26 May 1998. PUC also asked Urban Services Department (USD) to assume temporary management of the Hong Kong Stadium and has also agreed to USD's proposals to return the entire pitch of the Hong Kong Stadium. The fundamental issue between the parties was the care and maintenance of the stadium pitch, but also a complaint about an unauthorized bungy jump by Canadian Paul G. Boyle.

In the end, the Hong Kong government was judged to have wrongfully terminated the management agreement and had to pay over HK$20 million in damages to Wembley Plc.

Hong Kong Stadium is now managed by the Leisure and Cultural Services Department of Hong Kong, after the Urban Council was disbanded.

== Football ==
=== Local matches ===
==== Hong Kong Premier League ====
Hong Kong Premier League clubs South China, Kitchee, Pegasus and Eastern had used Hong Kong Stadium as home.

==== Full house ====
The first full house official football match (i.e. non-exhibition match) at the Hong Kong Stadium was the 2009 AFC Cup semi-final second leg between South China AA and Kuwait SC. This was added to in the same year by the 2009 East Asian Games football final between Hong Kong U23 and Japan U23. Although there were empty seats in the stadium, all tickets were sold or distributed.

=== International matches ===
Hong Kong Stadium had hold numerous exhibition games. Notable national teams include Argentina and England. For clubs, all Premier League Big Six clubs—Arsenal, Chelsea, Liverpool, Manchester City, Manchester United, and Tottenham Hotspur have played in the stadium. Other famous clubs include Aston Villa, Atlético Madrid, Barcelona, PSV Eindhoven, Juventus, Leicester City, AC Milan, Inter Milan, Newcastle United, Paris Saint-Germain, Real Madrid and São Paulo.

==== AFC Asian Cup ====
The inaugural AFC Asian Cup finals was held in Hong Kong Stadium from 1 September to 15 September 1956 as a four-team round-robin competition with no final. It was won by South Korea, while Hong Kong finished third place. The stadium has also hosted the AFC Women's Asian Cup for four times, including the inaugural in 1975, 1981, 1986 and 1989.

==== Lunar New Year Cup ====
The stadium has hosted matches of the Lunar New Year Cup. Notable visiting national teams include Brazil, Chile, Colombia, Denmark, Mexico, Sweden, Switzerland, Uruguay, and FR Yugoslavia.

==== 1997–98 Asian Club Championship ====
The semi-finals and final of the 1997–98 Asian Club Championship were held at Hong Kong Stadium.

==== Hong Kong v Real Madrid ====
Luis Figo scored the first goal for Real Madrid from the penalty spot after Roberto Carlos was brought down in the area during the pre-season friendly match against Hong Kong select XI at the Hong Kong Stadium on 8 August 2003. Real Madrid won the match 4–2.

==== Kitchee v Manchester City ====
On 24 July 2019, Hong Kong Stadium held a club friendly match between Premier League champions Manchester City and Hong Kong Premier League club Kitchee. where Manchester City won 6–1.

==== Hong Kong v Inter Miami ====
On 4 February 2024, Hong Kong Stadium held a friendly match between Hong Kong League XI and Inter Miami CF, led to a controversy due to Lionel Messi's absence.

==== Premier League Asia Trophy ====
The ground has hosted the Premier League Asia Trophy for four times, including the 2007, 2011, 2013 and 2017 edition, more than any other stadium.

==== Saudi Super Cup ====
Hong Kong Stadium hosted the Saudi Super Cup in 2025.

=== Notable football matches held at Hong Kong Stadium ===
Notable football matches held at Hong Kong Stadium
Date	Home	Result	Away	Tournament	Attendance	Ref
1 September 1956	Hong Kong	2–3	Israel	1956 AFC Asian Cup	30,000	
6 September 1956	South Korea	2–2	Hong Kong	1956 AFC Asian Cup	25,000	
8 September 1956	Israel	1–2	South Korea	1956 AFC Asian Cup	25,000	
9 September 1956	South Vietnam	2–2	Hong Kong	1956 AFC Asian Cup	20,000	
12 September 1956	Israel	2–1	South Vietnam	1956 AFC Asian Cup	10,000	
15 September 1956	South Korea	5–3	South Vietnam	1956 AFC Asian Cup	13,000	
14 June 1976	Hong Kong	0–0; 4–3 (p)	Japan	1976 AFC Asian Cup qualification Group match	26,801	
21 June 1976	Hong Kong	0–1	China	1976 AFC Asian Cup qualification Group match	28,550	
20 September 1979	Seiko (Hong Kong)	3–3	(United States) New York Cosmos	Exhibition game	27,612	
5 December 1980	Hong Kong	1–0	Australia	International friendly	9,548	
28 December 1980	Hong Kong	2–2	North Korea	1982 FIFA World Cup qualification First round Group stage	27,629	
31 December 1980	Hong Kong	0–0 (a.e.t.); 4–5 (p)	China	1982 FIFA World Cup qualification First round Zonal semi-finals	27,582	
10 January 1982	Seiko (Hong Kong)	0–2	(Argentina) Boca Juniors	Exhibition game	28,000	
17 February 1985	Hong Kong	0–0	China	1986 FIFA World Cup qualification First round Group stage	20,935	
22 September 1985	Hong Kong	1–2	Japan	1986 FIFA World Cup qualification Second round Second leg	28,000	
5 April 1994	South China (Hong Kong)	4–2	(Brazil) São Paulo	Exhibition game		
4 February 1995	Hong Kong League XI	1–3	Colombia	1995 Lunar New Year Cup	30,745	
4 February 1995	FR Yugoslavia (Federal Republic of Yugoslavia)	1–0	South Korea	1995 Lunar New Year Cup	30,745	
7 February 1995	Hong Kong League XI	0–1	Poland	1996 Lunar New Year Cup	32,019	
7 February 1995	Japan	1–1; 4–5 (p)	Sweden	1996 Lunar New Year Cup	32,019	
19 February 1995	Hong Kong	0–3	Japan	1995 Dynasty Cup Group stage	29,753	
26 February 1995	Hong Kong	1–1; 3–1 (p)	China	1995 Dynasty Cup Third place match	27,668	
26 May 1996	Golden XI (Hong Kong)	0–1	England	Exhibition game		
30 May 1996	South China	0–1	Instant-Dict	1995–96 Hong Kong First Division League Grand final	31,210	
20 July 1997	South China (Hong Kong)	0–1	(England) Manchester United	Exhibition game	36,611	
3 April 1998	Persepolis (Iran)	0–2	(China) Dalian Wanda	1997–98 Asian Club Championship Semi-finals		
3 April 1998	Pohang Steelers (South Korea)	1–0	(Saudi Arabia) Al-Hilal	1997–98 Asian Club Championship Semi-finals		
5 April 1998	Persepolis (Iran)	1–4	(Saudi Arabia) Al-Hilal	1997–98 Asian Club Championship Third place match		
5 April 1998	Dalian Wanda (China)	0–0 (a.e.t.); 5–6 (p)	(South Korea) Pohang Steelers	1997–98 Asian Club Championship Final		
24 July 1999	South China (Hong Kong)	0–2	(England) Manchester United	Exhibition game	40,000	
11 February 2001	Paraguay	1–1; 5–6 (p)	South Korea	2001 Lunar New Year Cup	30,000	
11 February 2001	Hong Kong League XI	1–2	Norway	2001 Lunar New Year Cup	30,000	
29 January 2002	Hong Kong League XI	1–1; 4–3 (p)	China	2002 Lunar New Year Cup	26,244	
1 February 2002	China	0–0; 3–4 (p)	Slovenia	2002 Lunar New Year Cup	30,329	
1 February 2002	Hong Kong League XI	0–1	Honduras	2002 Lunar New Year Cup	30,329	
27 July 2003	Hong Kong	0–6	(England) Liverpool	Exhibition game	40,000	
8 August 2003	Hong Kong Select XI	2–4	(Spain) Real Madrid	Exhibition game	39,000	
31 May 2004	Kitchee (Hong Kong)	2–1	(Italy) AC Milan	Exhibition game	16,923	
25 January 2005	Hong Kong	1–7	Brazil	2005 Lunar New Year Cup	23,425	
23 July 2005	Hong Kong XI	0–2	(England) Manchester United	Exhibition game	33,971	
24 July 2007	Fulham (England)	0–1	(England) Portsmouth	2007 Premier League Asia Trophy	36,801	
24 July 2007	South China (Hong Kong)	1–3	(England) Liverpool	2007 Premier League Asia Trophy	36,801	
27 July 2007	South China (Hong Kong)	1–4	(England) Fulham	2007 Premier League Asia Trophy	39,535	
27 July 2007	Liverpool (England)	0–0; 2–4 (p)	(England) Portsmouth	2007 Premier League Asia Trophy	39,535	
11 August 2007	Mission Hills Invitation XI (Hong Kong)	0–4	(Spain) Barcelona	Exhibition game	23,792	
9 March 2008	South China invitation team (Hong Kong)	2–2; 5–4 (p)	(United States) LA Galaxy	Exhibition game	14,060	
22 May 2008	South China invitation team (Hong Kong)	3–1	(England) Manchester City	Exhibition game	17,516	
22 May 2008	South China (Hong Kong)	2–1	(Italy) Juventus	Exhibition game	17,516	
2 August 2009	South China (Hong Kong)	2–0	(England) Tottenham Hotspur	Exhibition game	23,025	
30 September 2009	South China (Hong Kong)	1–0	(Uzbekistan) Neftchi Farg'ona	2009 AFC Cup Quarter-finals Second leg	20,112	
21 October 2009	South China (Hong Kong)	0–1	Al-Kuwait	2009 AFC Cup Semi-finals Second leg	37,459	
12 December 2009	Japan	1–1 (a.e.t.); 2–4 (p)	Hong Kong	2009 East Asian Games Gold medal match	31,884	
27 July 2011	Aston Villa (England)	1–0	(England) Blackburn Rovers	2011 Premier League Asia Trophy	33,967	
27 July 2011	Kitchee (Hong Kong)	0–4	(England) Chelsea	2011 Premier League Asia Trophy	33,967	
30 July 2011	Kitchee (Hong Kong)	0–3	(England) Blackburn Rovers	2011 Premier League Asia Trophy	38,911	
30 July 2011	Chelsea (England)	2–0	(England) Aston Villa	2011 Premier League Asia Trophy	38,911	
29 July 2012	Kitchee (Hong Kong)	2–2	(England) Arsenal	Exhibition game	39,209	
24 July 2013	Tottenham Hotspur (England)	1–3	(England) Sunderland	2013 Premier League Asia Trophy	35,950	
24 July 2013	Manchester City (England)	1–0	(Hong Kong) South China	2013 Premier League Asia Trophy	35,950	
27 July 2013	Tottenham Hotspur (England)	6–0	(Hong Kong) South China	2013 Premier League Asia Trophy	39,544	
27 July 2013	Manchester City (England)	1–0	(England) Sunderland	2013 Premier League Asia Trophy	39,544	
29 July 2013	Kitchee (Hong Kong)	2–5	(England) Manchester United	Exhibition game	39,102	
29 July 2014	Kitchee (Hong Kong)	2–6	(France) Paris Saint-Germain	Exhibition game	17,153	
14 October 2014	Hong Kong	0–7	Argentina	International friendly	20,230	
26 May 2017	Kitchee (Hong Kong)	1–4	(England) Tottenham Hotspur	Exhibition game	27,568	
19 July 2017	Leicester City (England)	0–0; 7–6 (p)	(England) West Bromwich Albion	2017 Premier League Asia Trophy	39,273	
19 July 2017	Liverpool (England)	2–0	(England) Crystal Palace	2017 Premier League Asia Trophy	39,273	
22 July 2017	West Bromwich Albion (England)	0–2	(England) Crystal Palace	2017 Premier League Asia Trophy	39,498	
22 July 2017	Liverpool (England)	2–1	(England) Leicester City	2017 Premier League Asia Trophy	39,498	
24 July 2019	Kitchee (Hong Kong)	1–6	(England) Manchester City	Exhibition game	20,926	
4 February 2024	Hong Kong League XI	1–4	(United States) Inter Miami	Exhibition game	38,417	
27 August 2024	Kitchee (Hong Kong)	1–6	(Spain) Atlético Madrid	Exhibition game	15,034	
30 May 2025	Hong Kong	1–3	(England) Manchester United	Exhibition game	33,098	
19 August 2025	Al-Nassr (Saudi Arabia)	2–1	(Saudi Arabia) Al-Ittihad	2025 Saudi Super Cup Semi-finals	30,653	
20 August 2025	Al-Qadsiah (Saudi Arabia)	1–5	(Saudi Arabia) Al-Ahli	2025 Saudi Super Cup Semi-finals	16,253	
23 August 2025	Al-Nassr (Saudi Arabia)	2–2; 3–5 (p)	(Saudi Arabia) Al-Ahli	2025 Saudi Super Cup Final	30,240	

== Rugby ==
From 1982 to 2024, the annual Hong Kong Sevens tournament was hosted at Hong Kong Stadium. The stadium has also hosted the Rugby World Cup Sevens twice, in 1997 and 2005.

On 1 November 2008, the ground became the first stadium outside of Australia and New Zealand to host a Bledisloe Cup test match, where New Zealand's All Blacks triumphed over Australia's Wallabies with a score of 19–14. In 2010, the Hong Kong Stadium welcomed 26,210 spectators for the second Bledisloe Cup rugby union game.

On 1 June 2013, the British and Irish Lions and Barbarian F.C. played a rugby union match at the Hong Kong Stadium.

== Hong Kong International Cricket Sixes ==
The ground has hosted matches of the Hong Kong International Cricket Sixes since 1996 to 1997.

== 2009 East Asian Games ==
The stadium was used as the final venue for both the Rugby 7s and Football tournaments of the 2009 East Asian Games. Hong Kong's rugby 7s team and football team both made the final against Japan. The rugby 7s team finished second to Japan. While the football team defeated them in front of over 31,000 spectators, including Donald Tsang, winning the Hong Kong football team's first ever international medal.

== 2013 muddy turf fiasco ==
In 2013, during the Barclays Asia Trophy, Sunderland manager Paolo Di Canio described the pitch as "a killer", while Manchester City centre-back Matija Nastasić is injured on the mudheap pitch, although Nastasić's injury was caused by a kick to the ankle according to City manager Manuel Pellegrini, who refused to blame the muddy pitch. Tottenham Hotspur manager André Villas-Boas was also critical of the pitch after Jan Vertonghen, a first-choice Spurs defender, incurred an ankle injury playing on the surface. "If I can be sincere, I would prefer not to play, but this is the reality that we have to face," said the Portuguese on the eve of his side's friendly against South China AA. Manchester United then cancelled their public training session at the stadium on Sunday amid concerns over the playing surface, did not want to further damage the playing surface or risk any injuries to their players, ahead of their exhibition match with Kitchee SC on 29 July.

On 30 July, the director of leisure and cultural services, Betty Fung Ching Suk-yee said returfing the much-criticised Hong Kong Stadium pitch is being considered, after football fans worldwide slammed the sodden, muddy surface during Barclays Asia Trophy matches on 24 and 27 July. South China FC chairman Steven Lo said in an official blog that recent matches have exposed a serious management problem. Chief Executive Leung Chun-ying said he has asked the Home Affairs Bureau and the Leisure and Cultural Services Department for short, medium and long-term remedies.

In 2015, with support from the Jockey Club, the pitch was completely returfed. The existing turf and soil was removed, the irrigation and drainage systems replaced, and new turf laid.

== Non-sports events ==
Jean-Michel Jarre held a concert at the Hong Kong Stadium on 11 March 1994. It was the first event after the re-construction of the Hong Kong Stadium.

Alan Tam held a concert at the Hong Kong Stadium from 22 to 24 April 1994. It was the first local artist held here.

On 16 March 1994 British band Depeche Mode performed at the Hong Kong Stadium as a stop of its Exotic Tour/Summer Tour '94.

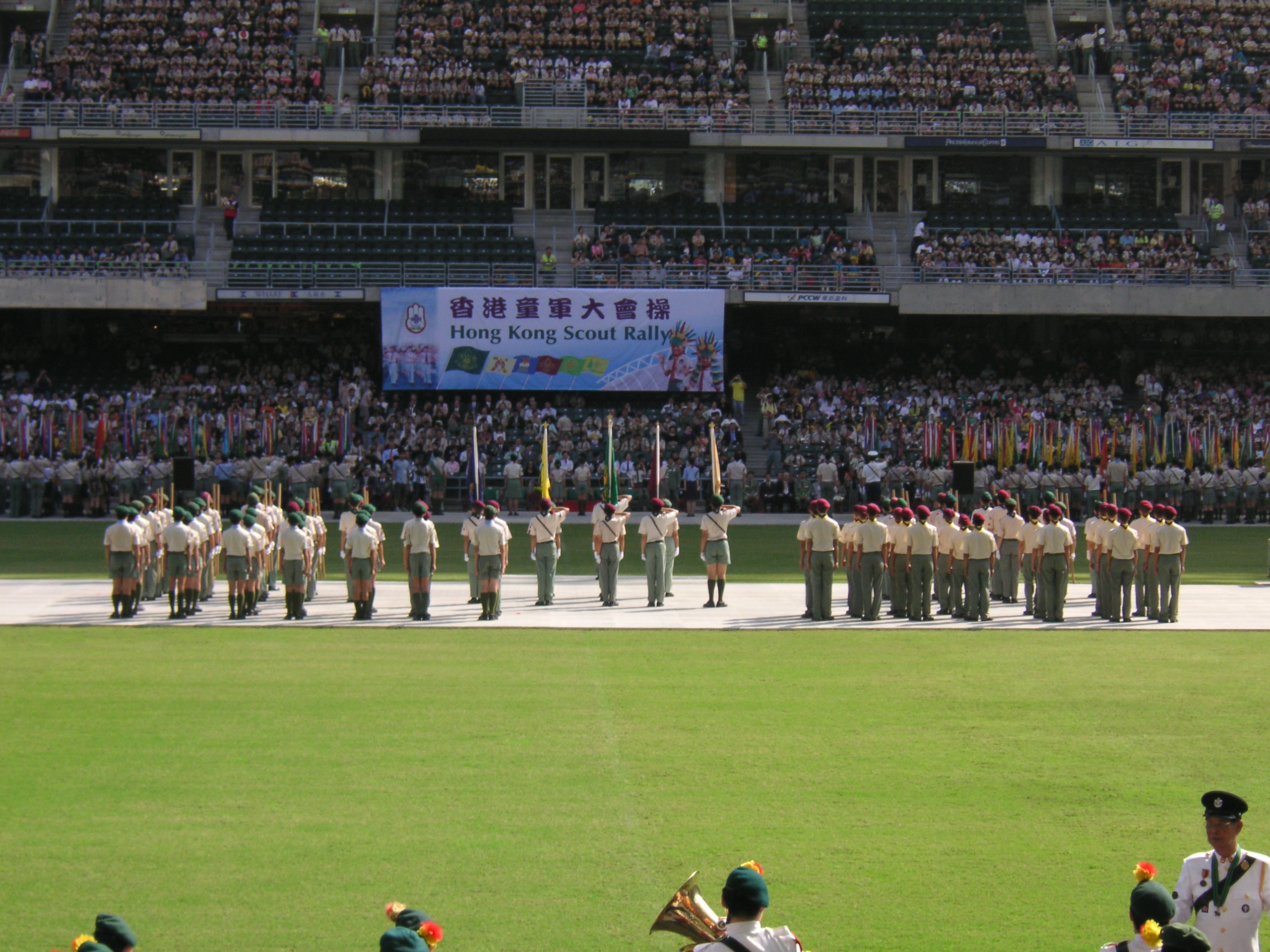
Hong Kong Stadium for Scout Rally

The only time the venue is used for live events is the Extravaganza of China Olympic Gold Medallists celebration show for the Chinese gold medallists.

Bon Jovi played a concert at the stadium on 25 September 1993 during I'll Sleep When I'm Dead Tour. It was their first concert in Hong Kong.

Canadian Paul G. Boyle illegally bungy jumped from the roof of the Hong Kong Stadium on the morning of Friday 24 May 1996. He was not arrested but was given a lifetime ban from all Urban Council facilities.

== Facilities ==
Hong Kong Stadium can accommodate 40,000. The spread is as below:

- 18,256 at Main level
- 18,507 at Upper levels
- 3,153 at Executive levels
- 57 wheelchair spaces

In addition, there are many refreshment kiosks inside the stadium.

== Other use ==
The stadium was supposed to be a multi purpose entertainment and sports venue, due to its much greater capacity compared to the other popular and over used Hong Kong Coliseum, where nearly all uses are now strictly for popular entertainment. However, its open-air nature has led to noise complaints from residents in tower blocks surrounding the stadium. It has not been allowed to host entertainment events since 1999.

== Gallery ==
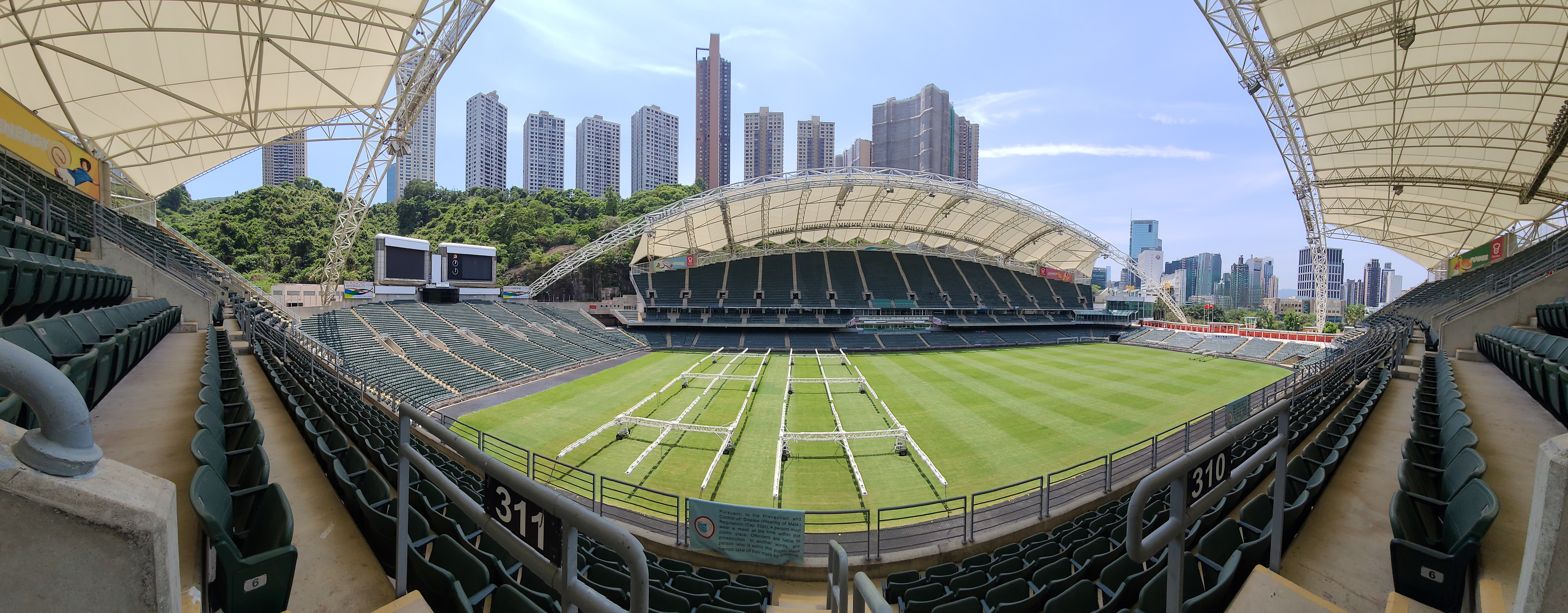
Hong Kong Stadium

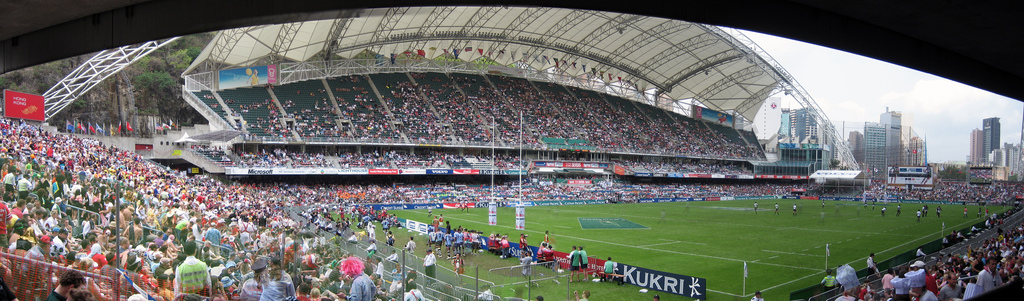
Hong Kong Stadium

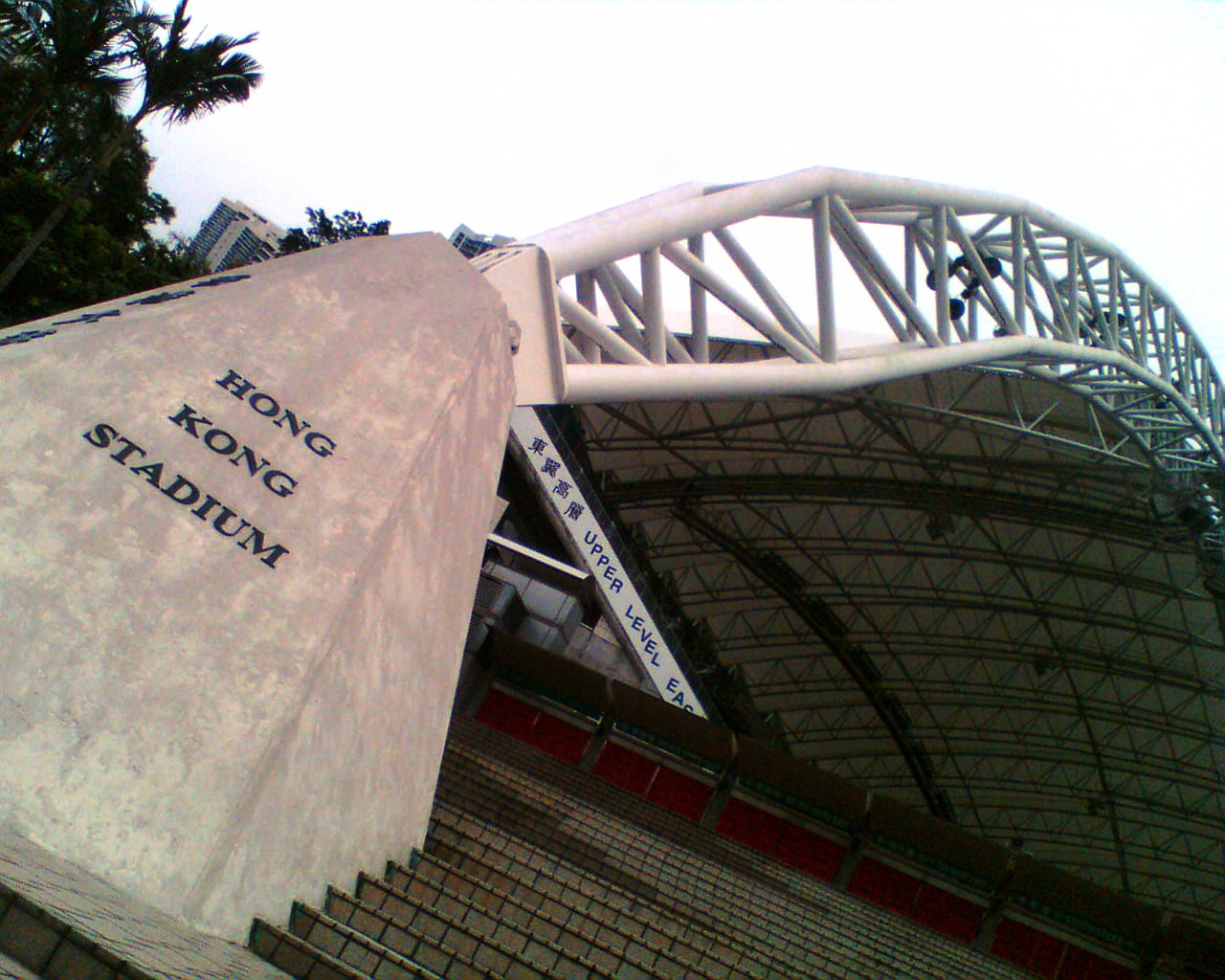
Steel frame that supports the canopy

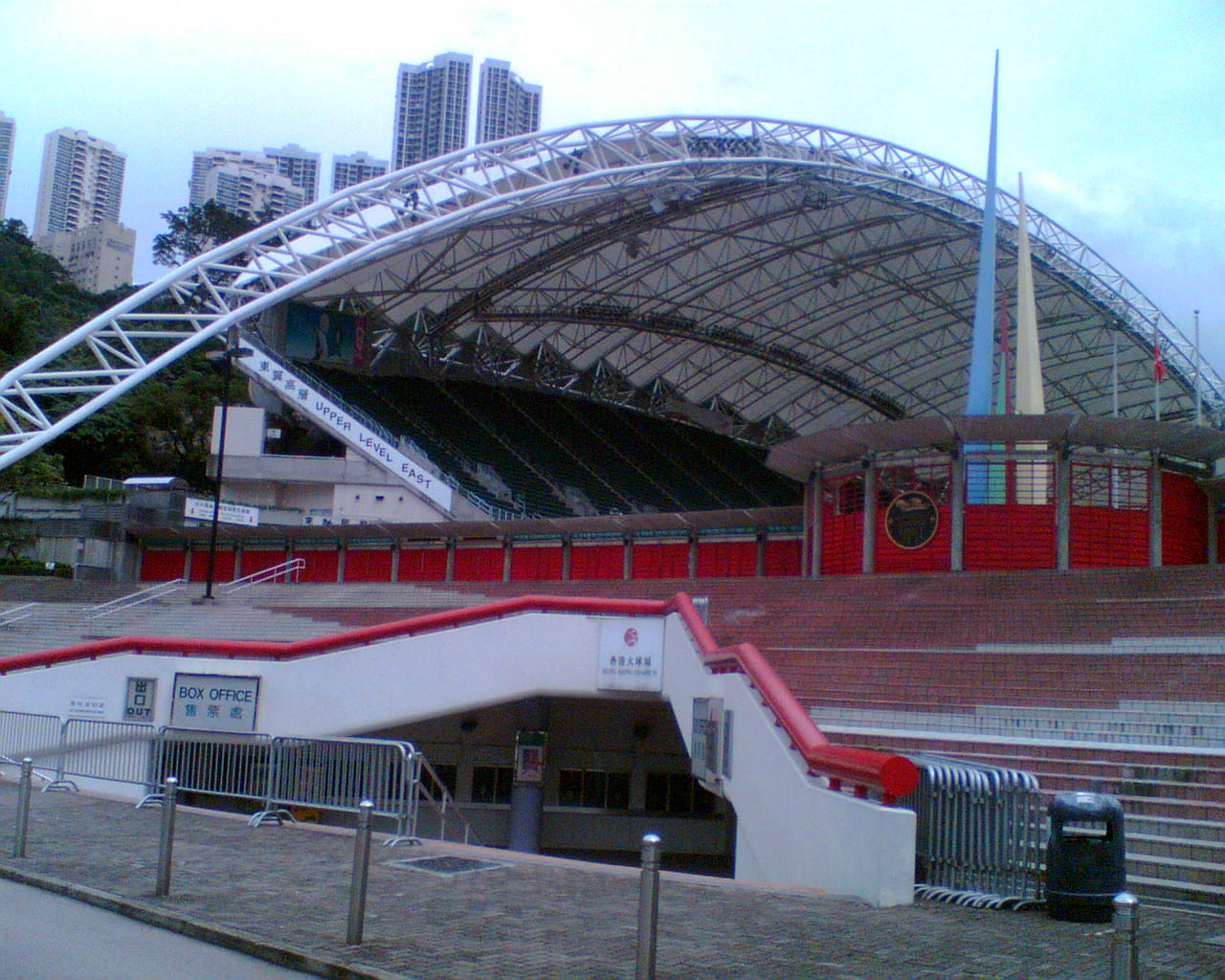
East Grandstand

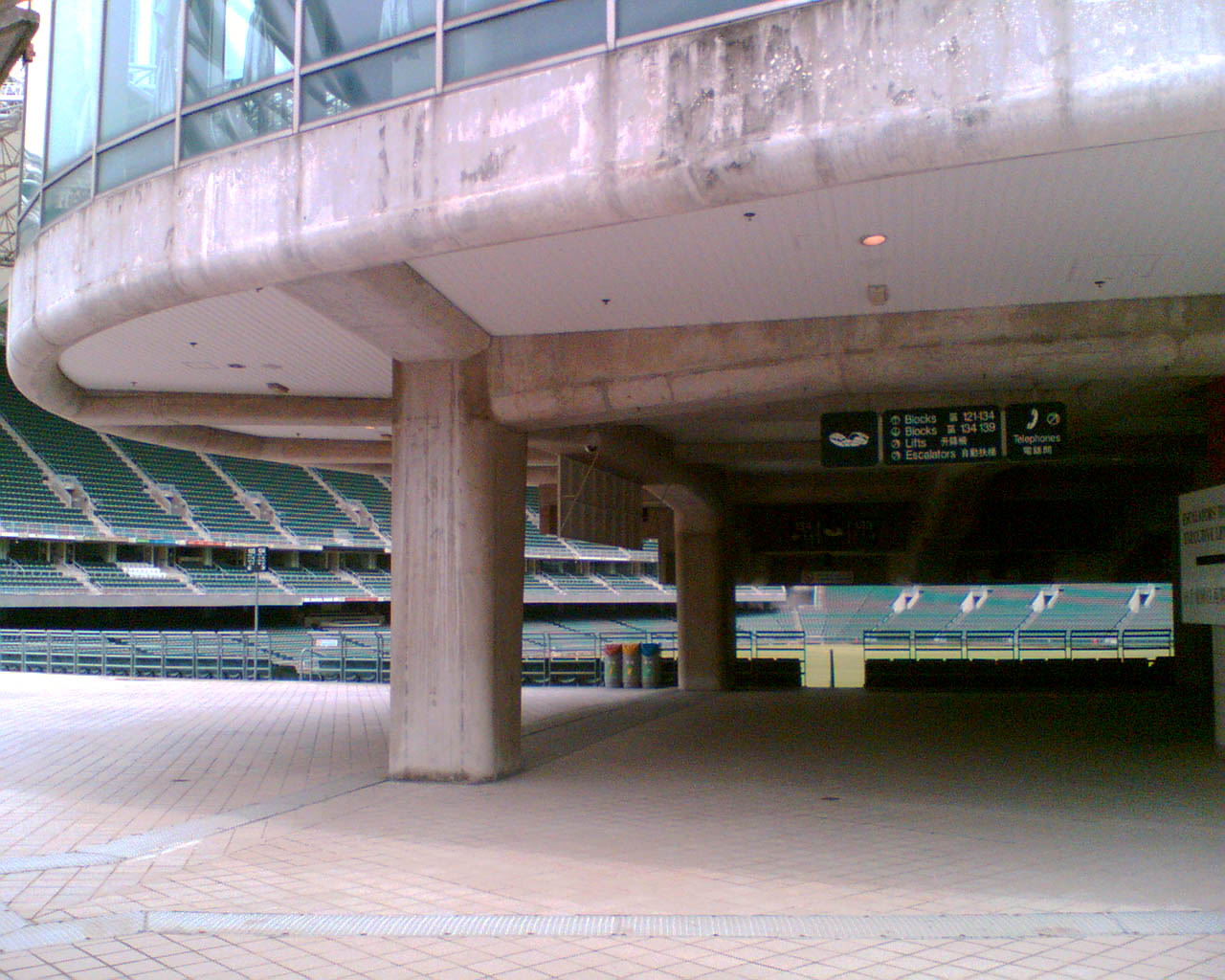
Walkway at the Grandstand

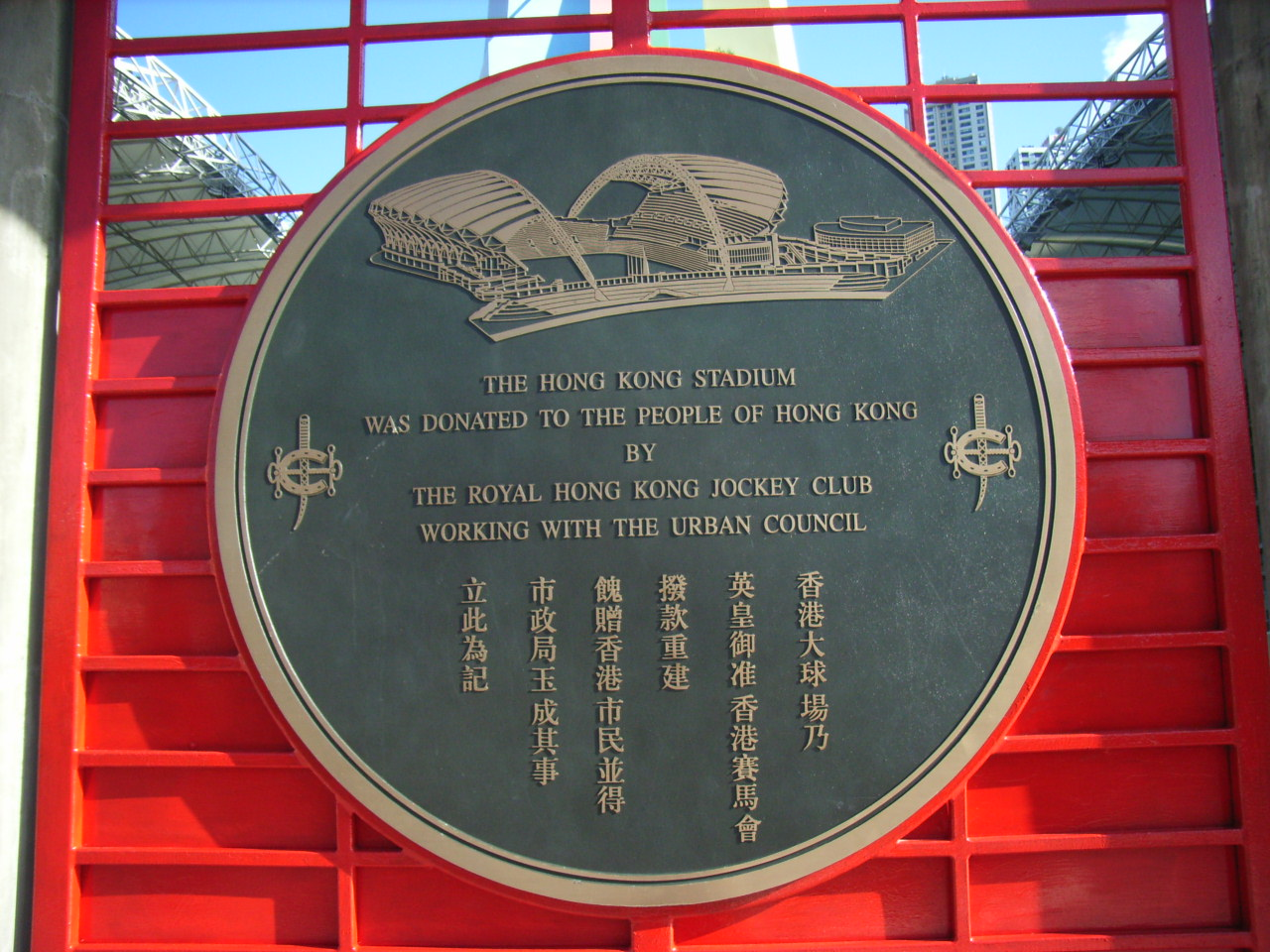
Memorial plaque

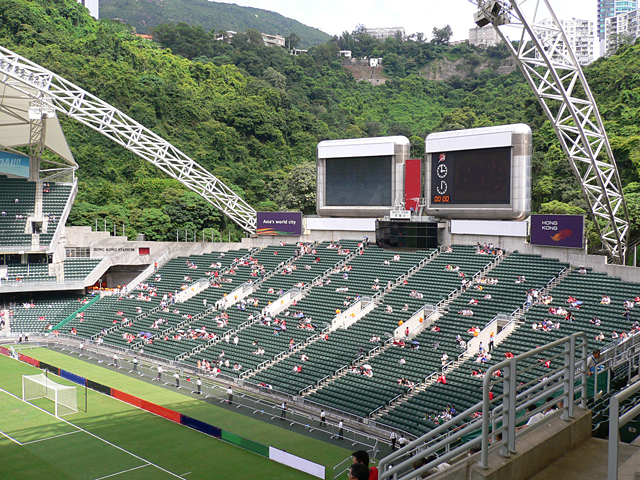
lawn

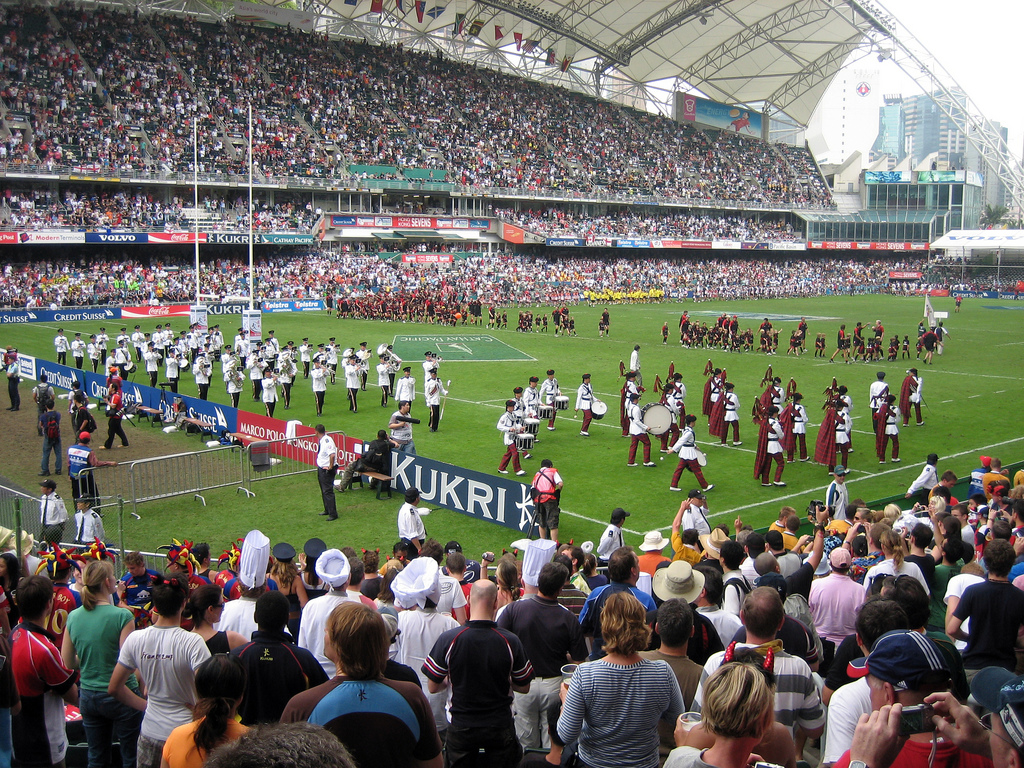
ceremony

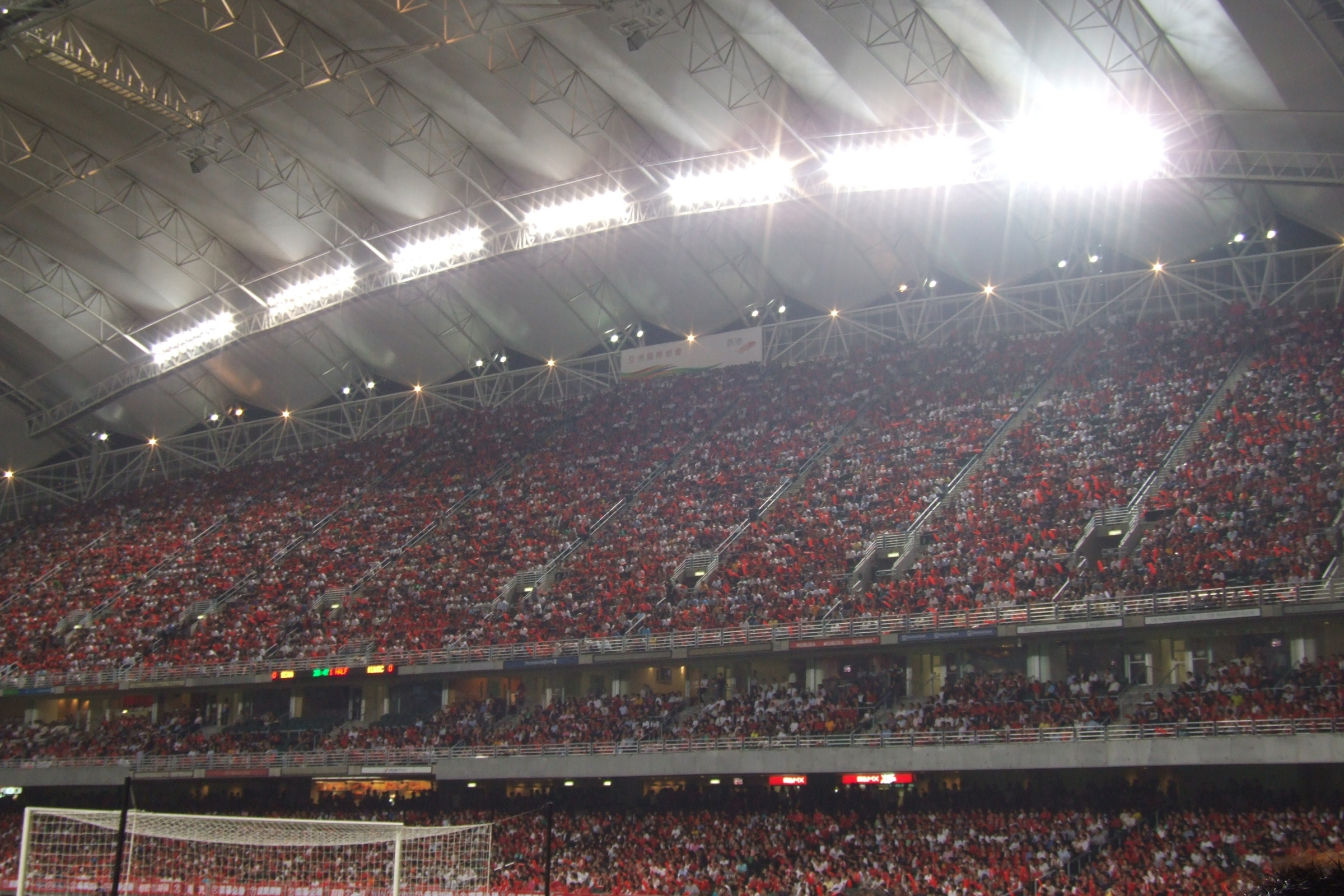
2009

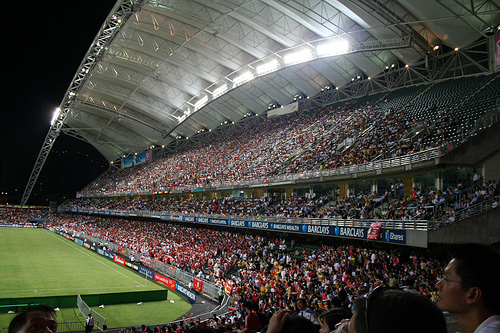
2007, Barclays Asia Trophy

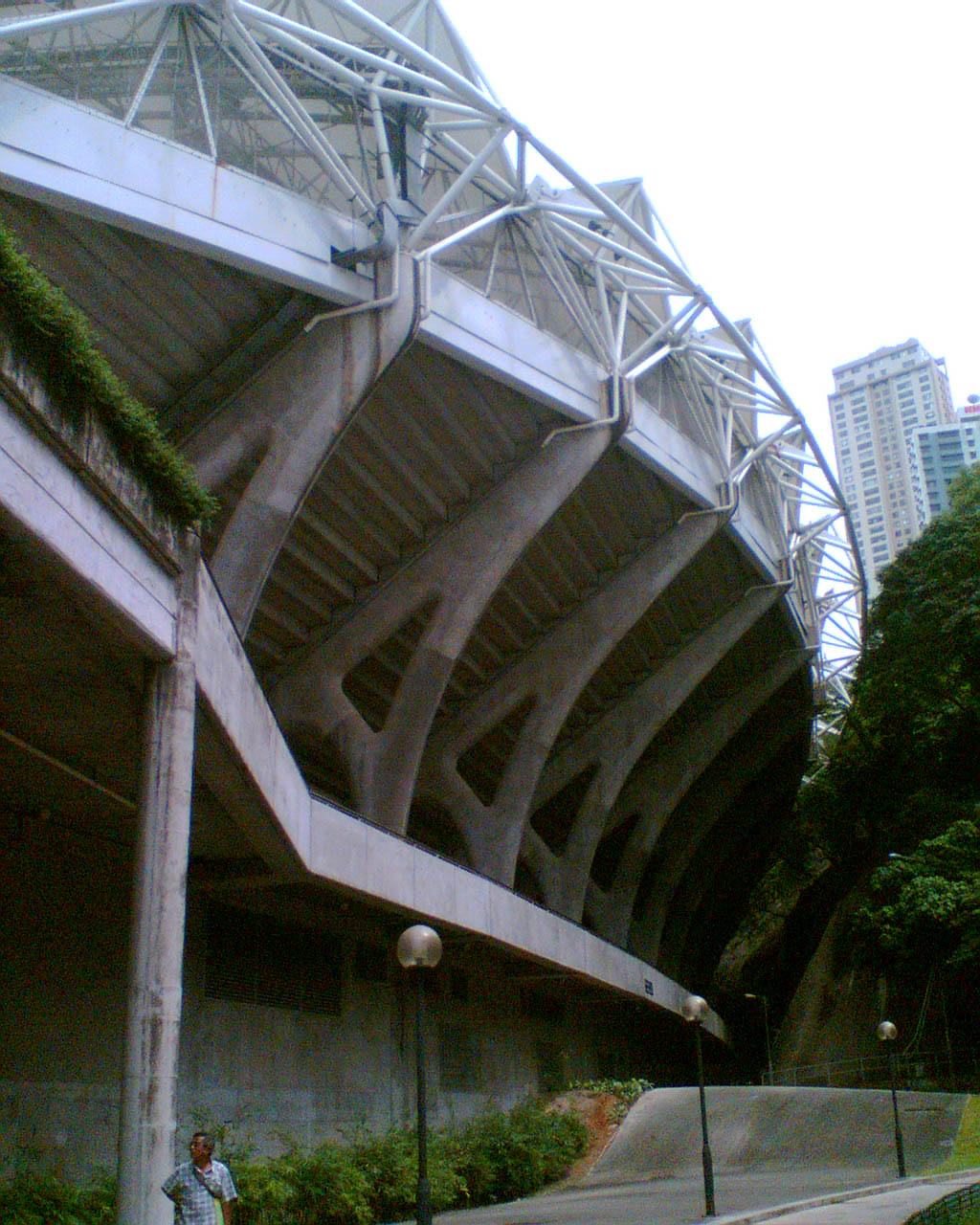
2006

== See also ==
- Hong Kong Premier League
- List of national stadiums
