= 2009 Premier League Asia Trophy =

Tournament details
- Host country: China
- Teams: 4 (from 2 confederations)
- Venue: 1 (in 1 host city)

Final positions
- Champions: (England) Tottenham Hotspur (1st title)
- Runners-up: (England) Hull City
- Third place: (England) West Ham United
- Fourth place: (China) Beijing Guoan

Tournament statistics
- Matches played: 4
- Goals scored: 8 (2 per match)

The 2009 Premier League Asia Trophy (Chinese: 巴克莱亚洲杯2009) was the fourth edition of the Premier League Asia Trophy, a four-team association football tournament held every two years. Hull City, Tottenham Hotspur, West Ham United and the local Chinese Super League club Beijing Guoan competed for the title on 29 July and 31 July in the Workers' Stadium, Beijing. Tottenham Hotspur won the trophy.

== Competition format ==
The competition uses a knock-out format. On July 29, West Ham United played against Tottenham Hotspur, while Hull City meeting Beijing Guoan. Final, 3rd and 4th playoff were played two days later.

== Results ==
Semi-finals
29 July 2009 – Beijing (Workers' Stadium)
(England) West Ham United	0
(England) Tottenham Hotspur	1
29 July 2009 - Beijing (Workers' Stadium)
(England) Hull City	1 (5)
(China) Beijing Guoan	1 (4)

Final
31 July 2009 – Beijing (Workers' Stadium)
(England) Tottenham Hotspur	3
(England) Hull City	0
Third place
31 July 2009 – Beijing (Workers' Stadium)
(England) West Ham United	2
(China) Beijing Guoan	0

=== Third place play-off ===
2009-07-31
18:00 UTC+8
11:00 BST

West Ham United (England)	2 – 0	(China) Beijing Guoan
Gabbidon 80'; Hines 90'	(Report)

Workers' Stadium, Beijing
Attendance: 7,501
Referee: Sun Baojie (China PR)

=== Final ===
2009-07-31
20:30 UTC+8
13:30 BST

Tottenham Hotspur (England)	3 – 0	(England) Hull City
Keane 16', 68' (pen.); Lennon 88'	(Report)

Workers' Stadium, Beijing
Attendance: 10,056
Referee: Martin Atkinson (England)

Tottenham Hotspur	Hull City

== Ticket sales issues ==
Ticket prices started as low as RMB80 (GBP 7) and rose to RMB380 (GBP 34). Prices were the same for both days.

However, by 15 July 2009, only 20,000 of the 120,000 tickets available for the 29 July and 31 July knockout tournament had been sold, with most fans buying the cheap seats. Reports that Beijing Guoan would field a second-string side as they rest their best players for a China Super League match against Chongqing Lifan on 2 August, while the latter refused to change the schedule also hampered sales.
