= 2011 Premier League Asia Trophy =

Tournament details
- City: Hong Kong
- Dates: 27 July – 30 July
- Teams: 4 (from 2 confederations)
- Venue: 1 (in 1 host city)

Final positions
- Champions: (England) Chelsea (2nd title)
- Runners-up: (England) Aston Villa
- Third place: (England) Blackburn Rovers
- Fourth place: (Hong Kong) Kitchee

Tournament statistics
- Matches played: 4
- Goals scored: 10 (2.5 per match)
- Top scorer(s): Nine players (1 goal each)
- Best player: (England) Frank Lampard

The 2011 Premier League Asia Trophy was the fifth edition of the Premier League Asia Trophy. Chelsea, Aston Villa, Blackburn Rovers and Hong Kong club Kitchee competed for the title on 27 July 2011 and 30 July 2011 in Hong Kong Stadium. The winners were Chelsea, beating Aston Villa 2–0 in the final.

== Results ==
Semi-finals
27 July – Hong Kong
(Hong Kong) Kitchee	0
(England) Chelsea	4
27 July – Hong Kong
(England) Aston Villa	1
(England) Blackburn Rovers	0

Final
30 July – Hong Kong
(England) Chelsea	2
(England) Aston Villa	0
Third place
30 July – Hong Kong
(Hong Kong) Kitchee	0
(England) Blackburn Rovers	3

=== Semifinals ===
All kick-off times are local (UTC+08:00).

27 July 2011
18:00

Aston Villa (England)	1–0	(England) Blackburn Rovers
Bent 49'	Report

Hong Kong Stadium, So Kon Po
Attendance: 33,967
Referee: Ng Chiu Kok

27 July 2011
20:30

Kitchee (Hong Kong)	0–4	(England) Chelsea
	Report	Lampard 37'; Luzardo 50' (o.g.); Drogba 61'; Sturridge 78'

Hong Kong Stadium, So Kon Po
Attendance: 33,967
Referee: Phil Dowd

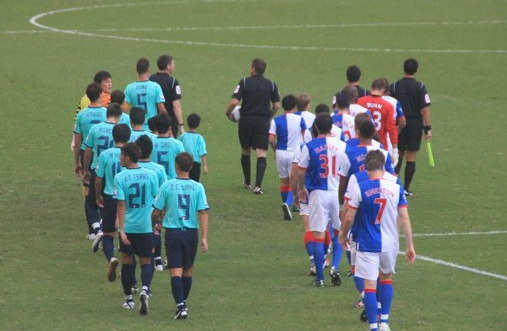
Kitchee vs Blackburn Rovers

=== Third-place playoff ===
30 July 2011
18:00

Kitchee (Hong Kong)	0–3	(England) Blackburn Rovers
	Report	Formica 15'; Dunn 70'; Blackman 86' (pen.)

Hong Kong Stadium, So Kon Po
Attendance: 38,911
Referee: Phil Dowd

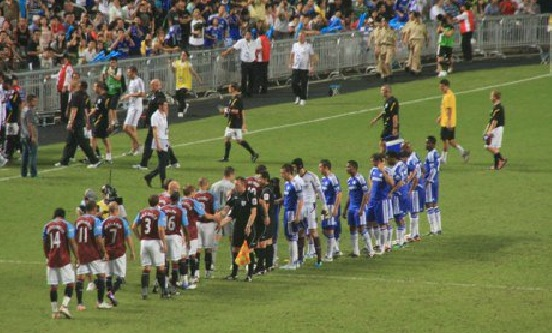
Aston Villa vs Chelsea

=== Final ===
30 July 2011
20:30

Chelsea (England)	2–0	(England) Aston Villa
McEachran 1'; Torres 58'	Report

Hong Kong Stadium, So Kon Po
Attendance: 38,911
Referee: Mike Dean

Chelsea	Aston Villa

== Ticket sales ==
Ticket prices for each match day in Hong Kong dollars (with all British prices an approximation) were: $130 (£10), $210 (£16.50), $270 (£21), $330 (£26), $460 (£36).

Ticket sales started from 1 June 2011 at Hong Kong Football Association and online at www.cityline.com. More than two thirds of the 80,000 tickets available were purchased by Hong Kong football fans after just five days.

== Goalscorers ==
1 goal

- (Argentina) Mauro Formica
- (England) Darren Bent
- (England) Frank Lampard
- (England) Daniel Sturridge
- (England) David Dunn
- (England) Nick Blackman
- (England) Josh McEachran
- (Ivory Coast) Didier Drogba
- (Spain) Fernando Torres

1 own goal

- (Spain) Ubay Luzardo (playing against Chelsea)
