= 2017 Premier League Asia Trophy =

Tournament details
- City: Hong Kong
- Dates: 19 July – 22 July
- Teams: 4 (from 1 confederation)
- Venue: 1 (in 1 host city)

Final positions
- Champions: (England) Liverpool (1st title)
- Runners-up: (England) Leicester City
- Third place: (England) Crystal Palace
- Fourth place: (England) West Bromwich Albion

Tournament statistics
- Matches played: 4
- Goals scored: 9 (2.25 per match)
- Attendance: 158,771 (39,693 per match)
- Top scorer(s): Nine players (1 goal each)

The 2017 Premier League Asia Trophy was the eighth edition of the Premier League Asia Trophy. Crystal Palace, Liverpool, Leicester City and West Bromwich Albion competed for the Premier League Asia Trophy. It was held in Hong Kong at the Hong Kong Stadium from 19–22 July 2017. It was the first edition with four Premier League teams to compete and therefore not feature a side from the host country.

Liverpool won their first title following their 2–1 victory over Leicester City in the final.

== Results ==
Semi-finals
19 July – Hong Kong
(England) Leicester City (pen.)	1 (7)
(England) West Bromwich Albion	1 (6)
19 July – Hong Kong
(England) Liverpool	2
(England) Crystal Palace	0

Final
22 July – Hong Kong
(England) Liverpool	2
(England) Leicester City	1
Third place
22 July – Hong Kong
(England) West Bromwich Albion	0
(England) Crystal Palace	2

=== Semi-finals ===
All kick-off times are local (UTC+08:00).

19 July 2017
18:00

Leicester City (England)	1–1	(England) West Bromwich Albion
Mahrez 24'	Report	Rodriguez 10'
Penalties
Ulloa (penalty scored); Vardy (penalty scored); Drinkwater (penalty scored); Fuchs (penalty scored); Iborra (penalty scored); King (penalty scored); Albrighton (penalty scored)	7–6	(penalty scored) Chadli; (penalty scored) Robson-Kanu; (penalty scored) Evans; (penalty scored) Dawson; (penalty scored) McClean; (penalty scored) Leko; (penalty missed) Field

Hong Kong Stadium, Hong Kong
Attendance: 39,273
Referee: Paul Tierney (England)

19 July 2017
20:30

Liverpool (England)	2–0	(England) Crystal Palace
Solanke 61'; Origi 79'	Report

Hong Kong Stadium, Hong Kong
Attendance: 39,273
Referee: Bobby Madley (England)

=== Third place play-off ===
22 July 2017
18:00

West Bromwich Albion (England)	0–2	(England) Crystal Palace
	Report	Milivojević 11'; Sako 43'

Hong Kong Stadium, Hong Kong
Attendance: 39,498
Referee: Ng Chiu Kok (Hong Kong)

=== Final ===
22 July 2017
20:30

Liverpool (England)	2–1	(England) Leicester City
Salah 20'; Coutinho 44'	Report	Slimani 12'

Hong Kong Stadium, Hong Kong
Attendance: 39,498
Referee: Bobby Madley (England)

Liverpool	Leicester City

== Goalscorers ==
1 goal

- (Brazil) Philippe Coutinho
- (Algeria) Riyad Mahrez
- (Serbia) Luka Milivojević
- (Belgium) Divock Origi
- (England) Jay Rodriguez
- (Mali) Bakary Sako
- (Egypt) Mohamed Salah
- (Algeria) Islam Slimani
- (England) Dominic Solanke
