= List of Premier League seasons =

Premier League
- Founded: 20 February 1992
- Country: England
- Confederation: UEFA (Europe)
- Number of clubs: 20
- Level on pyramid: 1
- Relegation to: EFL Championship
- International cup(s): UEFA Champions League; UEFA Europa League; UEFA Conference League
- Current champions: Arsenal (4th title) (2025–26)
- Most championships: Manchester United (13 titles)
- Current: 2026–27 Premier League

The Premier League is an English professional league for association football clubs. At the top of the English football league system, it is the country's primary football competition and is contested by 20 clubs. Seasons run from August to May, with teams playing 38 matches each, totalling 380 matches in the season. Most games are played on Saturdays and Sundays, with games also played on certain weekday evenings.

The competition was formed in February 1992 following the decision of clubs in the Football League First Division to break away from The Football League, in order to take advantage of a lucrative television rights deal. Teams competing in the Premier League may qualify for the UEFA Champions League or UEFA Europa League by virtue of league positions. The competition adopts a promotion and relegation system with the Football League which comes into place at the end of each season. Since the inaugural season in 1992–93, 51 teams have competed in the Premier League. At the end of the 1994–95 season, the league was reduced from 22 teams to 20.

Seven clubs have won the title: Manchester United (13 times), Manchester City (8), Chelsea (5), Arsenal (4), Liverpool (2), Blackburn Rovers and Leicester City (1): Manchester City was the first club to win the league four consecutive seasons (2020–21 to 2023–24) and Arsenal was the only team to go an entire season without a single defeat, in 2003–04. The record number of points accumulated by a team is 100 by Manchester City, who won the Premier League in 2017–18. Norwich City have been relegated the most times (6) while Derby County accumulated the lowest ever points total with 11 in the 2007–08 season.

The Premier League Golden Boot, awarded to the top goalscorer each season, has been won by 25 players from 12 different clubs. Erling Haaland scored 36 goals in the 2022–23 season – the most in a Premier League season of either the 38-game or 42-game lengths. Dutchman Jimmy Floyd Hasselbaink was the first foreigner to win the award outright in 2000–01, having shared the accolade with Dwight Yorke of Trinidad and Tobago in 1998–99.

== History ==
=== Champions ===
"They've deserved to win the league and now, having opened the door, if they show the same hunger they have shown this year, there's no saying what they can achieve."

— Manchester United manager Alex Ferguson on his players winning the Premier League in May 1993.

In the inaugural season of the Premier League Manchester United finished 10 points clear of Aston Villa to win their first league championship in 26 years. The club successfully retained the title in 1993–94, leading the table after beating Aston Villa 2–1 in the fourth gameweek. Manchester United also completed a league and cup double, beating Chelsea 4–0 in the FA Cup final. Blackburn Rovers under the investment of owner Jack Walker and manager Kenny Dalglish won their first championship since 1913–14 on the final day of the 1994–95 season.

Despite Blackburn losing to Liverpool, Manchester United – in second place and two points behind the leaders before kick-off had failed to capitalise on the result, drawing at West Ham United. Manchester United however regained the Premier League in 1995–96 after much scrutiny over the inexperience of the first team at the beginning of the season. Newcastle United who held a 12-point lead at the top in January 1996 were pegged back in the following weeks before Manchester United moved in front at the end of March.

Manchester United retained the league in 1996–97 but were overhauled by Arsenal in the final ten weeks of the 1997–98 season, finishing second. Arsenal, managed by Arsène Wenger in his first full season at the club also beat Newcastle 2–0 in the FA Cup final to win the trophy and accomplish a double. They however failed to retain both trophies as Manchester United pipped Arsenal on the final day of the league season, winning the Premier League as well as defeating the holders in a FA Cup semi-final replay. United won the league for two successive seasons: in 1999–2000 ending the season 18 points in front and 2000–01 by 10. After four seasons without a trophy, Arsenal again completed a league and cup double in 2001–02 remarkably scoring in every single Premier League match. The title the following season was won by Manchester United, with striker Ruud van Nistelrooy scoring 25 goals in 38 league matches.

In the summer of 2003, Chelsea were taken over by businessman Roman Abramovich and despite the club spending over £100 million on new players, the 2003–04 champions were Arsenal, who became the first Premier League club to win the league without defeat. Chelsea's failure to finish first culminated in managerial changes: coach Claudio Ranieri was sacked and subsequently replaced with Portuguese José Mourinho. The club won the league in 2004–05, 12 points ahead of runners-up Arsenal, scoring 72 goals and conceding 15 in the process. Chelsea won a second successive Premier League title in 2005–06 before Manchester United became the third different club to win the league in four seasons in 2006–07.

After Arsenal led the division for much of the 2007–08 season, Manchester United retained the championship on the final day of the season and won their eleventh Premier League title in 2008–09 after much competition from Liverpool. Chelsea reclaimed the league in 2009–10, scoring a then-record 103 goals and won the FA Cup to end the season as double winners. In May 2011, Manchester United won their 12th Premier League title and a record 19th after drawing away to Blackburn Rovers.

Manchester City won their first league title in 44 years in 2011–12, beating Manchester United on goal difference after Sergio Agüero scored a stoppage-time winner against Queens Park Rangers on the final day.Manchester United regained the title in 2012–13, their 13th Premier League and 20th league title, in Alex Ferguson's final season as manager. Manchester City, under Manuel Pellegrini, won again in 2013–14, two points ahead of Liverpool before Chelsea won 2014–15 during Mourinho's second spell at the club.

In 2015–16, Leicester City, who had started the season as 5,000/1 outsiders, won their first top-flight title under Ranieri, finishing 10 points clear of Arsenal. Chelsea, under Antonio Conte, won in 2016–17 with a then record of 30 wins.

Manchester City surpassed that record with 32 wins in each of the next two seasons, winning back-to-back titles under the Spaniard Pep Guardiola. In 2017–18, they became the first club to reach 100 points in a Premier League season and set a league record with 106 goals.In 2018–19, they finished one point ahead of Liverpoool, 98 to 97, and completed a domestic treble. Liverpool's 30 wins that season matched Chelsea's old mark.

Liverpool won 32 games and their first league title in 30 years, in a 2019–20 campaign interrupted for three months by the COVID-19 pandemic. They clinched it with seven games remaining, the earliest title win in Premier League history. In 2020–21, Manchester City reclaimed the title and retained it in 2021–22, coming from two goals down to beat Aston Villa 3-2 on the final day and finishing one point ahead of runner-up Liverpool. In 2022–23, City won the Premier League, the FA Cup and the UEFA Champions League to complete a treble. They became the first club to win four consecutive English top-flight titles after finishing top of the table in the 2023–24 season.

Arne Slot succeeded Jürgen Klopp as Liverpool's head coach ahead of the 2024–25 season. In his first season in charge, Liverpool clinched the title with four games to spare by beating Tottenham Hotspur 5–1 at Anfield on 27 April 2025, which brought their tally of English league titles level with Manchester United's record of 20. In 2025–26, Arsenal won their first league title since 2003–04, ending a 22-year wait. Under Mikel Arteta, they had finished second in each of the three previous seasons. Arsenal finished on 85 points, seven ahead of runners-up Manchester City, giving them their 14th English league title and fourth of the Premier League era.

=== Promotion and relegation ===
Nottingham Forest were the first team relegated from the Premier League in the 1992–93 season, losing 2–0 at home to Sheffield United on 1 May 1993. They were joined by Middlesbrough and Crystal Palace, with the latter club relegated on goal difference. Newcastle United and West Ham United were both automatically promoted from the First Division while Swindon Town triumphed in the playoffs.

Since then, the Premier League has consistently relegated three teams each season, replaced by three promoted clubs from the EFL Championship. The relegation battle often proves highly competitive, with clubs fighting to avoid the financial and sporting consequences of dropping to the second tier. The playoff system, introduced in the Football League, offers a dramatic conclusion to the season by determining the third promoted team through a series of knockout matches.

It is relatively rare for all three promoted teams to avoid relegation in the following Premier League season; this has only occurred twice in the league's history, underscoring the challenge newly promoted clubs face in maintaining their top-flight status.

Blackburn Rovers were the first Premier League champions to be subsequently relegated, in the 1998–99 and again in 2011–12, though both Leicester City (in 2003–04) and Manchester City (in 2000–01) had been relegated before winning their first titles. Most recently, in the 2022–23 season, Leicester City became the second Premier League-winning club to be relegated.

=== Top goalscorer ===
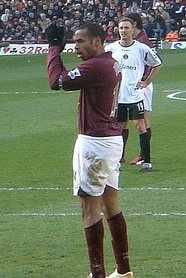
Thierry Henry has received the most Golden Boot awards with four.

The top goalscorer in the Premier League at the end of each season is awarded the Premier League Golden Boot. The first recipient was Teddy Sheringham of Tottenham Hotspur, who scored 21 goals in 40 games for the club as well as an additional goal for Nottingham Forest on the opening day of the season. Andy Cole scored 34 goals for Newcastle United in 1993–94 before Alan Shearer won three consecutive awards: twice for Blackburn Rovers including their league-winning season and once for Newcastle United in 1996–97.

Chris Sutton, Michael Owen and Dion Dublin of Blackburn Rovers, Liverpool and Coventry City respectively were the joint recipients of the Golden Boot the following season, with 18 goals apiece. Owen again shared the accolade, scoring 18 goals in 1998–99 with Manchester United striker Dwight Yorke and Leeds forward Jimmy Floyd Hasselbaink. In 1999–2000, the award was given to Kevin Phillips of newly promoted Sunderland, scoring 30 goals in 36 games. At a strike rate of 0.83, he was also awarded the European Golden Shoe.

Hasselbaink was the winner in 2000–01, scoring 23 goals for Chelsea in 35 appearances. Thierry Henry of Arsenal picked up the prize a year later with 24 goals and Manchester United striker Ruud van Nistelrooy was the awardee in 2002–03, scoring one more than the previous season's tally. Henry picked up three successive Golden Boots in 2003–04, 2004–05 and 2005–06 scoring 30, 25 and 27 goals respectively. Chelsea striker Didier Drogba was the top goalscorer in 2006–07 with 20 goals and Manchester United midfielder Cristiano Ronaldo contributed to his team's success in 2007–08, scoring 31 goals in 34 league games; a strike rate of 0.91. Nicolas Anelka of Chelsea was the recipient in 2008–09 with 18 goals before his fellow strike partner Drogba won his second Golden Boot the following season with 29 goals. Both Carlos Tevez and Dimitar Berbatov of Manchester City and Manchester United respectively each won their first Golden Boot at the end of the 2010–11 season, scoring 20 goals.

Robin van Persie won the award in consecutive seasons for two different clubs. He scored 30 goals for Arsenal in 2011–12, then 26 for Manchester United in 2012–13 as they won the league. Luis Suárez of Liverpool scored 31 goals in 2013–14, which also earned him a share of the European Golden Shoe. Sergio Agüero of Manchester City picked up the prize in 2014–15, scoring 26 goals. Tottenham Hotspur forward Harry Kane won back-to-back Golden Boots in 2015–16 and 2016–17, with 25 and 29 goals in 38 and 30 appearances respectively. In 2017–18, his first season at Liverpool, Mohammed Salah scored 32 goals, a record for a 38-game Premier League season at the time. Salah then shared the award with Liverpool teammate Sadio Mané and Arsenal forward Pierre-Emerick Aubameyang in the 2018–19 season, with 22 goals each.

Jamie Vardy was the awardee in 2019–20 with 23 goals for Leicester City and Kane claimed his third Golden Boot in 2020–21 with the same total. In 2021–22, Salah and Tottenham forward Son Heung-min shared the award with 23 goals each, making Son the first Asian player to win it. Erling Haaland of Manchester City scored 36 goals in his 2022–23 debut season, setting the all-time Premier Leaague record for goals in a single season and winning the European Golden Shoe. Haaland was again the top goalscorer in 2023–24 with 27 goals. Salah won his fourth Golden Boot in 2024–25 with 29 goals as Liverpool claimed the title, equaling Henry's record of four awards. Haaland won his third Golden Boot in 2025–26 with 27 goals in 35 appearances, putting him level with Shearer and Kane on three wins, behind only Henry and Salah.

== Opening-day matches ==
Before the 2016–17 season, the Premier League's opening matches typically took place simultaneously on the first Saturday of the season, without one particular game being highlighted as the official opener. Although some early kickoff matches were occasionally televised in advance, the league did not designate a specific fixture to commence the season. From the 2016–17 season onwards, the Premier League began scheduling a standalone Friday evening match to officially mark the start of the campaign, establishing a new tradition within the competition's calendar.

Over the last nine seasons, the Premier League's opening match has resulted in six home wins and three away wins, with no draws recorded during this period. This pattern underscores the competitive nature of these season-opening fixtures. Opening matches often feature either newly promoted clubs aiming to make an impact or established teams seeking to set the tone for the campaign.

== Seasons ==
Key
| † | League champions won domestic double |
| § | League champions won domestic treble |
| # | League champions won European treble |
| ‡ | Team qualified as UCL winners |
| # | Team qualified as UEL winners |
| & | Team qualified as UECL winners |
| £ | Team qualified as FA Cup winners |

| Season | Champions (Titles) | UEFA Champions League (Note: The Champions League was initially contested by domestic league champions of nations affiliated to UEFA. From the 1997–98 UEFA Champions League season the competition was expanded to include eight domestic league runners-up selected by a coefficient system. A preliminary spot was awarded to the third place team in the Premier League starting from the 1998–99 Premier League season for the 1999–2000 UEFA Champions League and an increase in coefficient points in 2001, first in effect for the 2001–02 Premier League season ahead of the 2002–03 UEFA Champions League, resulted in an extra preliminary spot being awarded to the team finishing fourth in the Premier League. The 2008–09 Premier League season before the 2009–10 UEFA Champions League was the first to see the top three Premier League teams automatically qualify for the group stages of the competition, with the fourth-placed team participating in a play-off. As of the 2017–18 Premier League season ahead of the 2018–19 UEFA Champions League, the top four Premier League teams all automatically qualify for the group stages.) | UEFA Cup / Europa League (Note: Originally referred to as the UEFA Cup, the competition was revamped to the UEFA Europa League from the start of the 2009–10 season. Since the 2001–02 Premier League season ahead of the 2002–03 UEFA Cup, the fifth-placed team in the Premier League automatically qualifies for the competition. The winners of the FA Cup and League Cup also qualify. If the League Cup winner qualifies for Europe through their league place, the next best-placed team in the league takes the European spot. Prior to the 2014–15 Premier League season ahead of the 2015–16 UEFA Europa League, if the winner of the FA Cup had already qualified for European competition, their place would be transferred to the runner-up. However, starting in 2015, if the FA Cup winner has already qualified for European competition, the next best-placed team in the Premier League will take their place (same as the League Cup).) | UEFA Conference League (Note: First contested in the 2021–22 season, the competition serves as the bottom level of the Europa League, which was reduced from 48 to 32 teams in the group stage. The competition is primarily contested by teams from lower-ranked UEFA member associations. It was known as the UEFA Europa Conference League prior to the 2024–25 season.) | Relegated (to EFL Championship) | Promoted (from EFL Championship) | Player(s) | Goals in PL |
| Season | Champions (Titles) | Europe (Note: In addition to the Premier League champions, teams who also qualify for Europe by virtue of their league position, not those who qualify by other means such as winning the FA Cup, EFL Cup or via the Fair Play initiative. Two abolished competitions, the UEFA Cup Winners' Cup and the less prestigious UEFA Intertoto Cup, are excluded.) | | | Relegated (to EFL Championship) | Promoted (from EFL Championship) | Top scorer(s) | |
|---|---|---|---|---|---|---|---|---|
| 1992–93 | Manchester United (1) | — | Aston Villa; Norwich City | — | Crystal Palace; Middlesbrough; Nottingham Forest | Newcastle United; West Ham United; Swindon Town | Teddy Sheringham | 22 (Note: Sheringham joined Tottenham Hotspur in August 1992 for £2.1 million. In the league, he scored one goal for Nottingham Forest (against Liverpool on the opening weekend of the season) and 21 for Tottenham Hotspur.) |
| 1993–94 | Manchester United (2) † | — | Blackburn Rovers; Newcastle United | — | Sheffield United; Oldham Athletic; Swindon Town | Crystal Palace; Nottingham Forest; Leicester City | Andy Cole | 34 |
| 1994–95 | Blackburn Rovers (1) | — | Manchester United; Nottingham Forest; Liverpool; Leeds United | — | Crystal Palace; Norwich City; Leicester City; Ipswich Town | Middlesbrough; Bolton Wanderers | Alan Shearer | 34 |
| 1995–96 | Manchester United (3) † | — | Newcastle United; Aston Villa; Arsenal | — | Manchester City; Queens Park Rangers; Bolton Wanderers | Sunderland; Derby County; Leicester City | Alan Shearer | 31 |
| 1996–97 | Manchester United (4) | Newcastle United | Arsenal; Liverpool; Aston Villa | — | Sunderland; Middlesbrough (Note: Middlesbrough were deducted three points and fined £50,000 by the Premier League after failing to attend the scheduled fixture against Blackburn Rovers in January 1997.); Nottingham Forest | Bolton Wanderers; Barnsley; Crystal Palace | Alan Shearer | 25 |
| 1997–98 | Arsenal (1) † | Manchester United | Liverpool; Leeds United; Blackburn Rovers; Aston Villa | — | Bolton Wanderers; Barnsley; Crystal Palace | Nottingham Forest; Middlesbrough; Charlton Athletic | Dion Dublin; Michael Owen; Chris Sutton | 18 |
| 1998–99 | Manchester United (5) # (Note: As well as winning the league and FA Cup, Manchester United beat Bayern Munich 2–1 in the final of the UEFA Champions League to complete a European treble.) | Arsenal; Chelsea | Leeds United; Tottenham Hotspur | — | Charlton Athletic; Blackburn Rovers; Nottingham Forest | Sunderland; Bradford City; Watford | Jimmy Floyd Hasselbaink; Michael Owen; Dwight Yorke | 18 |
| 1999–2000 | Manchester United (6) | Arsenal; Leeds United | Liverpool; Chelsea; Leicester City; Aston Villa | — | Wimbledon; Sheffield Wednesday; Watford | Charlton Athletic; Manchester City; Ipswich Town | Kevin Phillips | 30 (Note: Kevin Phillips won the European Golden Shoe for the 1999–2000 season, scoring 30 league goals.) |
| 2000–01 | Manchester United (7) | Arsenal; Liverpool | Leeds United; Ipswich Town; Chelsea | — | Manchester City; Coventry City; Bradford City | Fulham; Blackburn Rovers; Bolton Wanderers | Jimmy Floyd Hasselbaink | 23 |
| 2001–02 | Arsenal (2) † | Liverpool; Manchester United; Newcastle United | Leeds United; Chelsea; Blackburn Rovers | — | Ipswich Town; Derby County; Leicester City | Manchester City; West Bromwich Albion; Birmingham City | Thierry Henry | 24 |
| 2002–03 | Manchester United (8) | Arsenal; Newcastle United; Chelsea | Liverpool; Blackburn Rovers; Southampton; Manchester City | — | West Ham United; West Bromwich Albion; Sunderland | Portsmouth; Leicester City; Wolverhampton Wanderers | Ruud van Nistelrooy | 25 |
| 2003–04 | Arsenal (3) | Chelsea; Manchester United; Liverpool | Newcastle United; Middlesbrough | — | Leicester City; Leeds United; Wolverhampton Wanderers | Norwich City; West Bromwich Albion; Crystal Palace | Thierry Henry | 30 (Note: Thierry Henry won the European Golden Shoe for the 2003–04 season, scoring 30 league goals.) |
| 2004–05 | Chelsea (1) | Arsenal; Manchester United; Everton; Liverpool‡ | Bolton Wanderers; Middlesbrough | — | Crystal Palace; Norwich City; Southampton | Sunderland; Wigan Athletic; West Ham United | Thierry Henry | 25 (Note: Thierry Henry shared the European Golden Shoe for the 2004–05 season with Diego Forlán, both scoring 25 league goals.) |
| 2005–06 | Chelsea (2) | Manchester United; Liverpool; Arsenal | Tottenham Hotspur; Blackburn Rovers; Newcastle United; West Ham United | — | Birmingham City; West Bromwich Albion; Sunderland | Reading; Sheffield United; Watford | Thierry Henry | 27 |
| 2006–07 | Manchester United (9) | Chelsea; Liverpool; Arsenal | Tottenham Hotspur; Everton; Bolton Wanderers; Blackburn Rovers | — | Sheffield United; Charlton Athletic; Watford | Sunderland; Birmingham City; Derby County | Didier Drogba | 20 |
| 2007–08 | Manchester United (10) | Chelsea; Arsenal; Liverpool | Everton; Aston Villa; Manchester City; Portsmouth; Tottenham Hotspur | — | Reading; Birmingham City; Derby County | West Bromwich Albion; Stoke City; Hull City | Cristiano Ronaldo | 31 (Note: Cristiano Ronaldo won the European Golden Shoe for the 2007–08 season, scoring 31 league goals.) |
| 2008–09 | Manchester United (11) | Liverpool; Chelsea; Arsenal | Everton; Aston Villa; Fulham | — | Newcastle United; Middlesbrough; West Bromwich Albion | Wolverhampton Wanderers; Birmingham City; Burnley | Nicolas Anelka | 19 |
| 2009–10 | Chelsea (3) † | Manchester United; Arsenal; Tottenham Hotspur | Manchester City; Aston Villa; Liverpool | — | Burnley; Hull City; Portsmouth (Note: Portsmouth were deducted ten points after entering administration in February 2010.) | Newcastle United; West Bromwich Albion; Blackpool | Didier Drogba | 29 |
| 2010–11 | Manchester United (12) | Chelsea; Arsenal; Manchester City | Tottenham Hotspur; Fulham; Stoke City; Birmingham City | — | Birmingham City; Blackpool; West Ham United | Queens Park Rangers; Norwich City; Swansea City | Dimitar Berbatov; Carlos Tevez | 20 |
| 2011–12 | Manchester City (1) | Manchester United; Arsenal; Chelsea‡ (Note: Despite finishing sixth in the 2011–12 Premier League, Chelsea qualified for the following season's Champions League by winning the 2011–12 UEFA Champions League, therefore taking the fourth place slot of Tottenham Hotspur. A maximum of four teams from England were only allowed to enter the Champions League at the time.) | Tottenham Hotspur; Newcastle United; Liverpool | — | Bolton Wanderers; Blackburn Rovers; Wolverhampton Wanderers | Reading; Southampton; West Ham United | Robin van Persie | 30 |
| 2012–13 | Manchester United (13) | Manchester City; Chelsea; Arsenal | Tottenham Hotspur; Swansea City; Wigan Athletic | — | Wigan Athletic; Reading; Queens Park Rangers | Cardiff City; Hull City; Crystal Palace | Robin van Persie | 26 |
| 2013–14 | Manchester City (2) | Liverpool; Chelsea; Arsenal | Everton; Tottenham Hotspur | — | Norwich City; Fulham; Cardiff City | Leicester City; Burnley; Queens Park Rangers | Luis Suárez | 31 (Note: Luis Suárez shared the European Golden Shoe for the 2013–14 season with Cristiano Ronaldo, both scoring 31 league goals.) |
| 2014–15 | Chelsea (4) | Manchester City; Arsenal; Manchester United | Tottenham Hotspur; Liverpool; Southampton | — | Hull City; Burnley; Queens Park Rangers | Bournemouth; Watford; Norwich City | Sergio Agüero | 26 |
| 2015–16 | Leicester City (1) | Arsenal; Tottenham Hotspur; Manchester City | Manchester United; Southampton; West Ham United | — | Newcastle United; Norwich City; Aston Villa | Burnley; Middlesbrough; Hull City | Harry Kane | 25 |
| 2016–17 | Chelsea (5) | Tottenham Hotspur; Manchester City; Liverpool; Manchester United# | Arsenal; Everton | — | Sunderland; Middlesbrough; Hull City | Newcastle United; Brighton & Hove Albion; Huddersfield Town | Harry Kane | 29 |
| 2017–18 | Manchester City (3) | Manchester United; Tottenham Hotspur; Liverpool | Chelsea; Arsenal; Burnley | — | Swansea City; Stoke City; West Bromwich Albion | Wolverhampton Wanderers; Cardiff City; Fulham | Mohamed Salah | 32 |
| 2018–19 | Manchester City (4) § | Liverpool; Chelsea; Tottenham Hotspur | Arsenal; Manchester United; Wolverhampton Wanderers | — | Cardiff City; Fulham; Huddersfield Town | Norwich City; Sheffield United; Aston Villa | Pierre-Emerick Aubameyang; Sadio Mané; Mohamed Salah | 22 |
| 2019–20 | Liverpool (1) | Manchester City; Manchester United; Chelsea | Leicester City; Tottenham Hotspur | — | Bournemouth; Watford; Norwich City | Leeds United; West Bromwich Albion; Fulham | Jamie Vardy | 23 |
| 2020–21 | Manchester City (5) | Manchester United; Liverpool; Chelsea | Leicester City; West Ham United | Tottenham Hotspur | Fulham; West Bromwich Albion; Sheffield United | Norwich City; Watford; Brentford | Harry Kane | 23 |
| 2021–22 | Manchester City (6) | Liverpool; Chelsea; Tottenham Hotspur | Arsenal; Manchester United | West Ham United | Burnley; Watford; Norwich City | Fulham; Bournemouth; Nottingham Forest | Mohamed Salah; Son Heung-min | 23 |
| 2022–23 | Manchester City (7) # | Arsenal; Manchester United; Newcastle United | Liverpool; Brighton & Hove Albion; West Ham United& | Aston Villa | Leicester City; Leeds United; Southampton | Burnley; Sheffield United; Luton Town | Erling Haaland | 36 (Note: Erling Haaland won the European Golden Shoe for the 2022–23 season, scoring 36 league goals.) |
| 2023–24 | Manchester City (8) | Arsenal; Liverpool; Aston Villa | Tottenham Hotspur; Manchester United | Chelsea | Luton Town; Burnley; Sheffield United | Leicester City; Ipswich Town Southampton | Erling Haaland | 27 |
| 2024–25 | Liverpool (2) | Arsenal; Manchester City; Chelsea; Newcastle United Tottenham Hotspur# | Aston Villa; Crystal Palace£ | Nottingham Forest | Leicester City; Ipswich Town; Southampton | Leeds United; Burnley Sunderland | Mohamed Salah | 29 |
| 2025–26 | Arsenal (4) | Manchester City; Manchester United; Aston Villa; Liverpool | Bournemouth; Sunderland Crystal Palace& | Brighton & Hove Albion | West Ham United; Burnley; Wolverhampton Wanderers | Coventry City; Ipswich Town; Hull City | Erling Haaland | 27 |
